= List of video games released in 2026 =

The following is a comprehensive index of all games released in 2026, sorted chronologically by release date, and divided by quarter. Information regarding developer, publisher, operating system, genre, and type of release is provided where available.

For a summary of 2026 in video games as a whole, see 2026 in video games.

- ← Jan
- Feb
- Mar
- Apr
- May
- Jun
- Jul
- Aug
- Sep
- Oct
- Nov
- Dec
- TBD →

== Legend ==
Video game platforms
DROID	Android	GEN	Genesis / Mega Drive	iOS	iOS, iPhone, iPod, iPadOS, iPad, visionOS, Apple Vision Pro
LIN	Linux, SteamOS	Luna	Amazon Luna	NS	Nintendo Switch
NS2	Nintendo Switch 2	OSX	macOS	PS4	PlayStation 4
PS5	PlayStation 5	PSVR	Playstation VR, PlayStation VR2	Quest	Meta Quest / Oculus Quest family, including Oculus Rift
WIN	Windows, all versions Windows 95 and up	XBO	Xbox One	XBX/S	Xbox Series X/S

Types of releases
Compilation	A compilation, anthology or collection of several titles, usually (but not always) belonging to the same series
Early access	A game launched in early access is unfinished and thus might contain bugs and glitches or have some of the content missing
Episodic	An episodic video game that is released in batches over a period of time
Expansion	A large-scale DLC to an already existing game that adds new story, areas and additions and/or changes to the game's mechanics
Full release	A full release of a game that launched in early access first
Limited	A special release (often called "Limited" or "Collector's Edition") with bonus collector's material. Often provided to people who pre-order a game
Port	The game first appeared on a different platform and a port was made. The game is like the original, with few or no differences
Remake	The game is an enhanced remake of an original, made using a new engine and/or assets and thus containing completely new sound, graphics and possibly changes to the story and/or gameplay
Remaster	The game is a remaster of an original, released on the same or different platform, with (usually minor) changes to graphics, sound and/or gameplay
Rerelease	The game was re-released on the same platform with no or only minor changes

Video game genres
4X	4X game	Action	Action game	Action RPG	Action role-playing game
Action-adventure	Action-adventure game	Adventure	Adventure game	Auto battler	Auto battler
Battle royale	Battle royale game	Brawler	Beat 'em up	Bullet heaven	Vampire Survivors–like
Bullet hell	Bullet hell	Business sim	Business simulation game	Casual	Casual game
City builder	City-building game	CMS	Construction and management simulation	Cozy	Cozy game
Deck building	Deck building game	Digital tabletop	Digital tabletop game	Dungeon crawl	Dungeon crawl
Extraction shooter	Extraction shooter	Farming	Farm life sim	Fighting	Fighting game
FPS	First-person shooter	God game	God game	Government sim	Government simulation game
Graphic adventure	Graphic adventure	Hack and slash	Hack and slash	Hero shooter	Hero shooter
Hidden object	Hidden object game	Horror	Horror game	Interactive film	Interactive film
Life sim	Life simulation game	Looter shooter	Looter shooter	Metroidvania	Metroidvania
MMO	Massively multiplayer online game	MOBA	Multiplayer online battle arena	Monster tamer	Monster-taming game
Narrative adventure	Narrative adventure game	Otome	Otome game	Party	Party video game
PCA	Point-and-click adventure	Platformer	Platformer	Puzzle	Puzzle video game
Puzzle-platformer	Puzzle-platformer	Racing	Racing video game	Rhythm	Rhythm game
Roguelike	Roguelike, Roguelite	RPG	Role-playing video game	RTS	Real-time strategy
RTT	Real-time tactics	Run and gun	Run and gun game	Sandbox	Sandbox game
Scrolling shooter	Scrolling shooter	Shoot 'em up	Shoot 'em up	Simulation	Simulation video game
Social sim	Social simulation game	Soulslike	Soulslike	Sports	Sports video game
Stealth	Stealth game	Strategy	Strategy video game	Survival	Survival game
Survival horror	Survival horror	Tactical RPG	Tactical role-playing game	Tactical shooter	Tactical shooter
TBS	Turn-based strategy	TBT	Turn-based tactics	Tile matching	Tile-matching video game
Tower defense	Tower defense	TPS	Third-person shooter	Vehicle sim	Vehicle simulation game
Vehicular combat	Vehicular combat game	Visual novel	Visual novel		

== List ==
- ← Jan
- Feb
- Mar
- Apr
- May
- Jun
- Jul
- Aug
- Sep
- Oct
- Nov
- Dec
- TBD →

=== January–March ===
Release date	Title	Platform(s)	Type(s)	Genre(s)	Developer(s)	Publisher(s)	Ref.
January 5	DuneCrawl	WIN	Original	Action-adventure	Alientrap		
January 5	Suika Game Planet (WW)	NS, NS2	Original	Puzzle	Aladdin X		
January 7	Dungeon Antiqua 2	WIN, OSX	Original	Dungeon crawl, RPG	Shiromofu Factory	AMATA Games	
January 7	Fairy Tail: Dungeons	NS	Port	Deck building (roguelike)	ginolabo	Kodansha	
January 8	I Am Future	NS, PS5, XBX/S	Port	Survival, Simulation	Mandragora	tinyBuild	
January 9	Fire Emblem: Path of Radiance	NS2	Port	Tactical RPG	Intelligent Systems, Nintendo SPD	Nintendo	
January 9	Pathologic 3	WIN, PS5	Original	Survival horror	Ice-Pick Lodge	HypeTrain Digital	
January 10	Code Violet	PS5	Original	Action, Horror	TeamKill Media		
January 12	Big Hops	WIN, NS, PS5	Original	Platformer, Action-adventure	Luckshot Games		
January 12	Quarantine Zone: The Last Check	WIN	Original	Simulation	Brigada Games	Devolver Digital	
January 13	Hytale	WIN, OSX, LIN	Early access	Sandbox	Hypixel Studios		
January 13	Temirana: The Lucky Princess and the Tragic Knights (WW)	NS	Original	Visual novel	ichicolumn	Idea Factory International	
January 15	Animal Crossing: New Horizons – Nintendo Switch 2 Edition	NS2	Remaster	Social sim	Nintendo EPD	Nintendo	
January 15	Cassette Boy	WIN, OSX, NS, PS4, PS5, XBO, XBX/S	Original	Puzzle, Action RPG	Wonderland Kazakiri	Pocketpair Publishing	
January 15	The Legend of Heroes: Trails Beyond the Horizon (WW)	NS, NS2: WW: WIN, PS4, PS5	JP: Port; WW: Original	RPG	Nihon Falcom	NIS America	
January 15	Oh Demon! Fix My TV	WIN	Original	Adventure, Horror	Melt, Mister Jagger		
January 16	BrokenLore: Unfollow	WIN, PS5, XBX/S	Original	Survival horror	Serafini Productions	Shochiku	
January 16	Earnest Evans Collection (Note: Includes El Viento, Earnest Evans, and Anett Futatabi.) (WW)	WIN, NS, PS4, PS5	Compilation	Action, Platformer, Brawler	Wolf Team, Edia	Limited Run Games	
January 20	2XKO	WIN, PS5, XBX/S	Full release	Fighting	Riot Games		
January 20	Mio: Memories in Orbit	WIN, NS2, PS5, XBX/S	Original	Metroidvania	Douze Dixièmes	Focus Entertainment	
January 21	DragonSword (KR)	WIN, iOS, DROID	Original	Action RPG	Hound13	Webzen	
January 21	Eldegarde	WIN	Full release	Action RPG	Notorious Studios		
January 22	Arknights: Endfield	WIN, PS5, iOS, DROID	Original	Action RPG, Factory sim	Mountain Contour	Gryphline	
January 22	Cult of the Lamb: Woolhaven	WIN, OSX, NS, PS4, PS5, XBO, XBX/S	Expansion	Roguelike, CMS	Massive Monster	Devolver Digital	
January 22	Dynasty Warriors: Origins	NS2	Port	Hack and slash	Omega Force	Koei Tecmo	
January 22	Final Fantasy VII Remake Intergrade	NS2, XBX/S	Port	Action RPG	Square Enix		
January 22	Perfect Tides: Station to Station	WIN, OSX	Original	PCA	Three Bees		
January 22	The Rumble Fish 2 – Nintendo Switch 2 Edition	NS2	Port	Fighting	Dimps	3goo	
January 22	SEGA Football Club Champions 2026	WIN, PS4, PS5, iOS, DROID	Original	Sports management	Sega		
January 22	Telenet Fuku-Bukuro (Note: Includes Lady Phantom, Travel Epule, Dekoboko Densetsu, Pop'n Magic, Naritore, and High Grenadier.) (JP)	NS	Compilation	Shoot 'em up	Telenet Japan, Edia	Edia	
January 22	Un:Logical (JP)	NS	Original	Visual novel	LicoBiTs, TIS Creation	Broccoli	
January 23	Escape from Ever After	WIN, NS, PS4, PS5, XBO, XBX/S	Original	RPG	Sleepy Castle Studio	HypeTrain Digital	
January 23	Fighting Force Collection	WIN, NS, PS4, PS5	Compilation	Brawler	Implicit Conversions	Limited Run Games	
January 23	Pathologic 3	XBX/S	Port	Survival horror	Ice-Pick Lodge	HypeTrain Digital	
January 26	Highguard	WIN, PS5, XBX/S	Original	Hero shooter	Wildlight Entertainment		
January 26	Viractal	WIN	Full release	RPG	Sting		
January 27	Earth Must Die	WIN	Original	PCA	Size Five	No More Robots	
January 28	Core Keeper – Nintendo Switch 2 Edition	NS2	Port	Sandbox, Survival	Pugstorm	Fireshine Games	
January 28	Dispatch	NS, NS2	Port	Adventure	AdHoc Studio		
January 28	Steel Century Groove	WIN	Original	Rhythm, RPG	Sloth Gloss Games		
January 29	Cairn	WIN, PS5	Original	Adventure, Survival	The Game Bakers		
January 29	Card-en-Ciel – Nintendo Switch 2 Edition	NS2	Port	Deck building, RPG	Inti Creates		
January 29	Chrono Ark Deluxe Edition	NS	Port	Deck building (roguelike), RPG	Al Fine	Playism	
January 29	City Tales: Medieval Era	WIN	Full release	City builder	Irregular Shapes	Firesquid	
January 29	Dark Auction	WIN, NS, PS5	Original	Adventure, Visual novel	IzanagiGames	Good Smile Company, IzanagiGames	
January 29	Disgaea Mayhem (Note: Released as Kyouran Makaism in Japan.) (JP)	NS, NS2, PS5	Original	Action RPG	Nippon Ichi Software		
January 29	Dokapon 3-2-1 Super Collection! (Note: Includes Dokapon 3-2-1: Arashi wo Yobu Yuujou, Kessen! Dokapon Oudoku IV: Densetsu no Yusha Tachi, and Dokapon Gaiden: Honoo no Audition.) (JP)	NS	Compilation	RPG	Sting Entertainment		
January 29	Don't Stop, Girlypop!	WIN	Original	FPS	Funny Fintan Softworks	Kwalee	
January 29	Dusk Index: Gion	WIN, NS, PS5	Original	Visual novel	Cherrymochi, Mebius	Bushiroad	
January 29	I Hate This Place	WIN, NS, PS5, XBX/S	Original	Survival horror	Rock Square Thunder	Broken Mirror Games, Skybound Games	
January 29	Kigetsu no Yoru (JP)	NS	Original	Survival horror, Adventure	Edia		
January 29	Run for Money: Hunters vs. Runners! Can You Win as Either? (WW)	WIN	Port	Action	D3 Publisher		
January 29	Space Warlord Baby Trading Simulator	WIN	Original	Business sim	Strange Scaffold	Strange Scaffold, Frosty Pop	
January 30	The 9th Charnel	WIN, PS5, XBX/S	Original	Survival horror	Saikat Deb Creations	Soedesco	
January 30	Code Vein II	WIN, PS5, XBX/S	Original	Action RPG	Bandai Namco Studios	Bandai Namco Entertainment	
January 30	Front Mission 3 Remake	WIN, PS4, PS5, XBO, XBX/S	Port	Tactical RPG	MegaPixel Studio	Forever Entertainment	
February 3	Aces of Thunder	WIN, PS5	Original	Vehicular combat (plane)	Gaijin Entertainment		
February 3	Yapyap	WIN	Original	Party, Horror	Maison Bap		
February 4	Balloon Kid	NS, NS2	Port	Platformer	Nintendo R&D1	Nintendo	
February 4	Opus: Echo of Starsong – Full Bloom Edition	PS5	Port	Adventure	Sigono		
February 4	Shiren the Wanderer: The Mystery Dungeon of Serpentcoil Island	iOS, DROID	Port	Roguelike, RPG	Spike Chunsoft		
February 4	Yoshi/Mario & Yoshi (Game Boy)	NS, NS2	Port	Puzzle	Game Freak	Nintendo	
February 5	Dragon Quest VII Reimagined	WIN, NS, NS2, PS5, XBX/S	Remake	RPG	Square Enix		
February 5	Hermit and Pig	WIN	Original	RPG	Heavy Lunch Studio		
February 5	Hollow Knight	NS2, PS5, XBX/S	Port	Metroidvania	Team Cherry		
February 5	Lovish	WIN, NS, PS5, XBO, XBX/S	Original	Action-adventure	Labs Works	Dangen Entertainment	
February 5	Super Bomberman Collection	WIN, NS, NS2, PS5, XBX/S	Compilation	Action, Puzzle, Maze	Red Art Games	Konami Digital Entertainment	
February 6	Carmageddon: Rogue Shift	WIN, NS2, PS5, XBX/S	Original	Vehicular combat, Racing	34BigThings		
February 6	My Hero Academia: All's Justice	WIN, PS5, XBX/S	Original	Fighting, Action	Byking	Bandai Namco Entertainment	
February 6	Nioh 3	WIN, PS5	Original	Action RPG, Hack and slash	Team Ninja	Koei Tecmo	
February 6	PGA Tour 2K25	NS2	Port	Sports	HB Studios	2K	
February 9	Primal Carnage: Evolution	PS4	Remaster	FPS	Circle 5 Studios	Circle 5 Publishing	
February 9	World's End Club	XBO, XBX/S	Port	Action-adventure, Puzzle	Too Kyo Games, Grounding	IzanagiGames	
February 10	Crisol: Theater of Idols	WIN, PS5, XBX/S	Original	Survival horror, FPS	Vermila Studios	Blumhouse Games	
February 10	Mewgenics	WIN	Original	Tactical RPG, Roguelike, Life sim	Edmund McMillen, Tyler Glaiel		
February 10	The Prisoning: Fletcher's Quest	WIN, NS	Original	Metroidvania	Elden Pixel	Acclaim Entertainment	
February 11	Cash Cleaner Simulator	PS5, XBX/S	Port	Business sim	Mind Control Games	Forklift Interactive, Digital Pajamas	
February 11	Romeo is a Dead Man	WIN, PS5, XBX/S	Original	Action-adventure	Grasshopper Manufacture		
February 11	Tokyo Scramble	NS2	Original	Survival, Action, Puzzle	Adglobe	Binary Haze Interactive	
February 12	BlazBlue Entropy Effect X	NS, PS5, XBX/S	Port	Action, Roguelike	91Act	Astrolabe Games	
February 12	ChromaGun 2: Dye Hard	WIN, NS2, PS5, XBX/S	Original	Puzzle, FPS	Pixel Maniacs	PM Studios	
February 12	Dear me, I was...	WIN, NS, iOS, DROID	Port	Adventure	Arc System Works		
February 12	Disciples: Domination	WIN, PS5, XBX/S	Original	Tactical RPG	Artefacts Studio	Kalypso Media	
February 12	God of War: Sons of Sparta	PS5	Original	Action, Platformer	Mega Cat Studios, Santa Monica Studio	Sony Interactive Entertainment	
February 12	Hakuoki SSL: Sweet School Life (WW)	NS	Port	Visual novel	Idea Factory	eastasiasoft	
February 12	Mario Tennis Fever	NS2	Original	Sports	Nintendo		
February 12	Ride 6	WIN, PS5, XBX/S	Original	Racing	Milestone		
February 12	Yakuza Kiwami 3 & Dark Ties	WIN, NS2, PS4, PS5, XBX/S	Remake + Original	Action-adventure	Ryu Ga Gotoku Studio	Sega	
February 13	High on Life 2	WIN, NS2, PS5, XBX/S	Original	FPS	Squanch Games		
February 13	Kingdom Come: Deliverance	PS5, XBX/S	Port	Action RPG	Warhorse Studios	Deep Silver	
February 13	Panty Party Perfect (WW)	PS4, PS5	Original	Action	Animu Game	Sekai Project	
February 13	Rayman: 30th Anniversary Edition	WIN, NS, PS5, XBX/S	Compilation	Platformer	Digital Eclipse	Ubisoft	
February 13	Reanimal	WIN, NS2, PS5, XBX/S	Original	Horror, Adventure	Tarsier Studios	THQ Nordic	
February 13	Rune Factory: Guardians of Azuma	PS5, XBX/S	Port	Action RPG, Simulation	Marvelous		
February 16	Caves of Qud	NS	Port	Roguelike, RPG	Freehold Games	Kitfox Games	
February 16	The Killing Stone	WIN	Early access	Deck building	Question		
February 17	3D Tetris	NS, NS2	Port	Puzzle	T&E Soft	JP: D4 Enterprise; WW: Nintendo	
February 17	Avowed	PS5	Port	Action RPG	Obsidian Entertainment	Xbox Game Studios	
February 17	Calamity Angels: Special Delivery (WW)	NS, PS4, PS5	Original	RPG	Compile Heart	Idea Factory International	
February 17	Forgotlings	WIN	Original	Action-adventure	Throughline Games	Hitcents	
February 17	Galactic Pinball	NS, NS2	Port	Pinball	Intelligent Systems	Nintendo	
February 17	Golf (Virtual Boy)	NS, NS2	Port	Sports	T&E Soft	JP: D4 Enterprise; WW: Nintendo	
February 17	The Mansion of Innsmouth	NS, NS2	Port	Action-Adventure	Be Top	I'MAX	
February 17	Red Alarm	NS, NS2	Port	Shoot 'em up	T&E Soft	JP: D4 Enterprise; WW: Nintendo	
February 17	Subnautica – Nintendo Switch 2 Edition	NS2	Port	Survival, Action-adventure	Unknown Worlds Entertainment		
February 17	Subnautica: Below Zero – Nintendo Switch 2 Edition	NS2	Port	Survival, Action-adventure	Unknown Worlds Entertainment		
February 17	Teleroboxer	NS, NS2	Port	Fighting	Nintendo R&D1	Nintendo	
February 17	Under the Island	WIN, NS, PS4, PS5, XBO, XBX/S	Original	Action RPG	Slime King Games	Top Hat Studios	
February 17	Virtual Boy Wario Land	NS, NS2	Port	Platformer	Nintendo R&D1	Nintendo	
February 18	Hunter × Hunter: Nen × Survivor	iOS, DROID	Original	Survival, Action, Roguelike	WonderPlanet	Bushimo	
February 18	Menherarium	WIN	Original	Deck building, Roguelite	Tezcatlipoca	Phoenixx	
February 18	Poppy Playtime: Chapter 5	WIN	Episode	Survival horror	Mob Entertainment		
February 18	Star Trek: Voyager – Across the Unknown	WIN, NS2, PS5, XBX/S	Original	Roguelike, Survival, Strategy	Gamexcite	Daedalic Entertainment	
February 19	Death Howl	NS, PS5, XBX/S	Port	Soulslike, Deck building	The Outer Zone	11 Bit Studios	
February 19	Death Match Love Comedy! (WW)	WW: WIN, NS, PS4; PS5, XBO, XBX/S	Remake: JP: Port	Visual novel	Kemco	PQube	
February 19	Demon Tides	WIN	Original	Platformer	Fabraz		
February 19	Earnest Evans Collection (JP)	PS4, PS5	Compilation	Action, Platformer, Brawler	Wolf Team, Edia	Edia	
February 19	Gear.Club Unlimited 3	NS2	Original	Racing	Eden Games	Nacon	
February 19	Love Eternal	WIN, NS, PS4, PS5, XBO, XBX/S	Original	Horror, Platformer	brlka	Ysbryd Games	
February 19	Paranormasight: The Mermaid's Curse	WIN, NS, iOS, DROID	Original	Visual novel	Xeen	Square Enix	
February 19	Showgunners	PS4, PS5, XBO, XBX/S	Port	TBT	Artificer	Klabater	
February 19	Styx: Blades of Greed	WIN, PS5, XBX/S	Original	Stealth	Cyanide Studio	Nacon	
February 19	Super Battle Golf	WIN	Original	Sports (golf)	Brimstone	Oro Interactive	
February 19	WiZmans World Re;Try (WW)	WIN, XBO: WW: NS, PS4, PS5	JP: Port; WW: Remaster	RPG	Lancarse, City Connection	Clear River Games	
February 19	Xenoblade Chronicles X: Definitive Edition – Nintendo Switch 2 Edition	NS2	Port	Action RPG	Monolith Soft	Nintendo	
February 19	Ys X: Proud Nordics (JP)	PS5	Port	Action RPG	Nihon Falcom		
February 20	Prize Fighter: Heavyweight Edition	WIN, PS4, PS5	Remaster	Interactive film	Digital Pictures, Screaming Villains, Limited Run Games	Limited Run Games	
February 20	Ys X: Proud Nordics (WW)	WIN, NS2, PS5	Remaster	Action RPG	Nihon Falcom	NIS America	
February 23	Tom Clancy's Rainbow Six Mobile	iOS, DROID	Original	Tactical shooter	Ubisoft Montreal	Ubisoft	
February 24	Fallout 4: Anniversary Edition	NS2	Port	Action RPG	Bethesda Game Studios	Bethesda Softworks	
February 25	Utawarerumono: Zan 2 (WW)	WIN	Port	Action RPG, Hack and slash	Aquaplus	Shiravune, DMM Games	
February 26	City Hunter	WIN, NS, NS2, PS5, XBX/S	Remake	Action	Sunsoft, Red Art Studios	Sunsoft, Clouded Leopard Entertainment	
February 26	Daisenryaku SSB2 (JP)	WIN, NS, NS2, PS5	Original	Strategy	SystemSoft Beta		
February 26	The Disney Afternoon Collection	NS, NS2	Compilation	Action, Platformer	Digital Eclipse, Capcom	Atari	
February 26	Icarus: Console Edition	PS5, XBX/S	Port	Survival	RocketWerkz	Grip Studios	
February 26	Maid Cafe on Electric Street	NS	Port	Simulation, Visual novel	Adventurer's Tavern	Playism	
February 26	No Sleep for Kaname Date – From AI: The Somnium Files	PS4, PS5, XBX/S	Port	Adventure, Visual novel	Spike Chunsoft		
February 26	Path of Mystery: A Brush with Death (WW)	NS	Original	Visual novel	Toybox	Aksys Games	
February 26	Raiden Fighters Remix Collection	NS, PS4, PS5	Compilation	Shoot 'em up	MOSS	JP: MOSS; WW: H2 Interactive	
February 26	Spellcasters Chronicles	WIN	Early access	MOBA, Action, Strategy	Quantic Dream		
February 26	Tokyo Xtreme Racer	PS5	Port	Racing	Genki		
February 26	Towerborne	WIN, PS5, XBX/S	Full release	Action RPG	Stoic	Xbox Game Studios	
February 27	Fear Effect 2: Retro Helix	WIN, NS, PS4, PS5	Port	Action-adventure	Implicit Conversions, Kronos Digital Entertainment	Limited Run Games	
February 27	Pokémon FireRed and LeafGreen	NS	Port	Monster tamer	Game Freak	JP: The Pokémon Company; WW: Nintendo	
February 27	Resident Evil 7: Biohazard Gold Edition	NS2	Port	Survival horror	Capcom		
February 27	Resident Evil Requiem	WIN, NS2, PS5, XBX/S	Original	Survival horror	Capcom		
February 27	Resident Evil Village Gold Edition	NS2	Port	Survival horror	Capcom		
February 27	Tales of Berseria Remastered	WIN, NS, PS5, XBX/S	Remaster	Action RPG	Bandai Namco Studios	Bandai Namco Entertainment	
March 2	World of Warcraft: Midnight	WIN, OSX	Expansion	MMORPG	Blizzard Entertainment		
March 3	Blue Prince	NS2	Port	Puzzle, Adventure	Dogubomb	Raw Fury	
March 3	Esoteric Ebb	WIN	Original	RPG	Christoffer Bodegård	Raw Fury	
March 3	iRacing Arcade	WIN	Original	Racing	Original Fire Games	iRacing	
March 3	Legacy of Kain: Defiance Remastered	WIN, NS, NS2, PS4, PS5, XBO, XBX/S	Remaster	Action-adventure	Crystal Dynamics		
March 3	Öoo	NS	Port	Puzzle-platformer	NamaTakahashi, tiny cactus studio, Tsuyomi	AMATA Games	
March 3	Rotwood	WIN, NS2	Full release	Roguelike, Hack and slash	Klei Entertainment		
March 3	Scott Pilgrim EX	WIN, LIN, NS, PS4, PS5, XBX/S	Original	Brawler	Tribute Games		
March 3	The Legend of Khiimori	WIN	Early access	Action-adventure	Aesir Interactive, NightinGames	Mindscape	
March 4	BLOKES on BLOCKS!	WIN, NS	Original	Party	Crafts & Meister		
March 4	Homura Hime	WIN	Original	Bullet hell, Action	Crimson Dusk	Playism	
March 5	Back to the Dawn	NS, NS2	Port	RPG	Metal Head Games	Clouded Leopard Entertainment, Spiral Up Games	
March 5	Banquet for Fools	WIN, OSX	Full release	RPG	Hannah and Joseph Games		
March 5	Docked	WIN, PS5, XBX/S	Original	CMS	Saber Interactive		
March 5	Marathon	WIN, PS5, XBX/S	Original	Extraction shooter, FPS	Bungie		
March 5	Never Grave: The Witch and The Curse	WIN, NS, PS4, PS5, XBX/S	Original	Metroidvania, Action, Roguelike	Frontside 180 Studio	Pocketpair Publishing	
March 5	Oceanhorn 3: Legend of the Shadow Sea	OSX, iOS	Original	Action-adventure, RPG	Cornfox & Bros.		
March 5	Planet of Lana II: Children of the Leaf	WIN, NS, NS2, PS4, PS5, XBO, XBX/S	Original	Puzzle, Adventure, Cinematic platformer	Wishfully	Thunderful Publishing	
March 5	Pokémon Pokopia	NS2	Original	Social sim, Sandbox	Game Freak, Omega Force	JP: The Pokémon Company; WW: Nintendo	
March 5	Poker Night at the Inventory	WIN, NS, PS4	Remaster	Card	Skunkape Games		
March 5	Slay the Spire II	WIN, OSX, LIN	Early access	Deck building (roguelike)	Mega Crit		
March 6	Lost and Found Co.	WIN, OSX	Original	Hidden object, Adventure	Bit Egg		
March 6	Sumerian Six	PS5, XBX/S	Port	RTT, Stealth	Artificer	Crunching Koalas	
March 10	Mario Clash	NS, NS2	Port	Action, Platformer	Nintendo R&D1	Nintendo	
March 10	Mario's Tennis	NS, NS2	Port	Sports	Nintendo R&D1, Tose	Nintendo	
March 10	Mario vs. Donkey Kong	NS, NS2	Port	Puzzle-platformer	Nintendo Software Technology	Nintendo	
March 11	The Liar Princess and the Blind Prince	WIN	Port	Action-adventure	Nippon Ichi Software	NIS America	
March 11	Öoo	PS5	Port	Puzzle-platformer	NamaTakahashi, tiny cactus studio, Tsuyomi	AMATA Games	
March 12	Ball x Pit	iOS, DROID	Port	Survival, Roguelike	Kenny Sun	Devolver Digital	
March 12	Bravely Default: Flying Fairy HD Remaster	WIN, XBX/S	Port	RPG	Cattle Call	Square Enix	
March 12	Suika Game Planet	iOS, DROID	Port	Puzzle	Aladdin X		
March 12	Timberborn	WIN, OSX	Full release	City builder	Mechanistry		
March 12	Tomb Raider I–III Remastered	NS2, iOS, Droid	Port	Action-adventure	Aspyr		
March 12	1348 Ex Voto	WIN, PS5	Original	Action-adventure	Sedleo	Dear Villagers	
March 12	Bubblegum Galaxy	WIN, NS, PS4, PS5, XBX/S	Original	Strategy, Puzzle	Smarto Club	Astrolabe Games	
March 12	Fatal Frame II: Crimson Butterfly Remake	WIN, NS2, PS5, XBX/S	Remake	Survival horror	Team Ninja	Koei Tecmo	
March 12	GreedFall 2: The Dying World	WIN, PS5, XBX/S	Full release	Action RPG	Spiders	Nacon	
March 12	John Carpenter's Toxic Commando	WIN, PS5, XBX/S	Original	FPS	Saber Interactive	Focus Entertainment	
March 12	RoadOut	WIN, NS, PS5, XBX/S	Original	Action-adventure	Rastrolabs	Dangen Entertainment	
March 12	R-Type Tactics I • II Cosmos (JP)	WIN, NS, NS2, PS4, PS5, XBX/S	Remake, Compilation	TBS, Tactical RPG, Shoot 'em up	Granzella Game Studios	Granzella	
March 12	Solasta II	WIN	Early access	Tactical RPG	Tactical Adventures		
March 12	Yomawari: Lost in the Dark (JP)	PS5	Port	Survival horror	Nippon Ichi Software		
March 13	Monster Hunter Stories 3: Twisted Reflection	WIN, NS2, PS5, XBX/S	Original	RPG	Capcom		
March 13	Lucid Blocks	WIN	Original	Sandbox	Lucy B. Locks		
March 13	Pode	XBO, XBX/S	Port	Puzzle, Adventure	Henchman & Goon		
March 13	WWE 2K26	WIN, NS2, PS5, XBX/S	Original	Sports (wrestling)	Visual Concepts	2K Games	
March 13	Yomawari: The Long Night Collection (JP)	PS5	Port	Survival horror	Nippon Ichi Software		
March 15	Gnosia	iOS, DROID	Port	Visual novel, RPG, Social deduction	Petit Depotto	Playism	
March 16	The Seven Deadly Sins: Origin	WIN, PS5	Original	Action RPG	Netmarble F&C	Netmarble	
March 16	Starship Troopers: Ultimate Bug War!	WIN, NS2, PS5, XBX/S	Original	FPS	Auroch Digital	Dotemu	
March 17	Dread Delusion	NS2, PS4, PS5, XBO, XBX/S	Port	RPG	Lovely Hellplace	DreadXP	
March 17	Fallen Tear: The Ascension	WIN	Early access	Metroidvania	Winter Crew	CMD Studios	
March 17	MLB The Show 26	NS, PS5, XBX/S	Original	Sports	San Diego Studio	Sony Interactive Entertainment, MLB Advanced Media	
March 17	Pokémon XD: Gale of Darkness	NS2	Port	Monster tamer	Genius Sonority	JP: The Pokémon Company; WW: Nintendo	
March 17	The Artisan of Glimmith	WIN	Original	Puzzle	Lunarch Studios	983 Interactive	
March 17	Thomas & Friends: Wonders of Sodor	WIN, PS4, PS5, XBO, XBX/S	Original	Adventure, Simulation	Dovetail Games		
March 18	Öoo	XBX/S	Port	Puzzle-platformer	NamaTakahashi, tiny cactus studio, Tsuyomi	AMATA Games	
March 18	Shadow Tactics: Blades of the Shogun	NS2	Port	RTT	Mimimi Games	Daedalic Entertainment	
March 19	The Coin Game	WIN, PS5, XBX/S	Full release	Adventure	devotid	Kwalee	
March 19	Crimson Desert	WIN, OSX, PS5, XBX/S	Original	Action-adventure	Pearl Abyss		
March 19	Death Stranding 2: On the Beach	WIN	Port	Action-adventure	Kojima Productions	Sony Interactive Entertainment	
March 19	Dragonkin: The Banished	WIN, PS5, XBX/S	Full release	Action RPG, Hack and slash	Eko Software	Nacon	
March 19	Human: Fall Flat – Nintendo Switch 2 Edition	NS2	Port	Puzzle-platformer	No Brakes Games	Curve Games	
March 19	Rushing Beat X: Return of Brawl Brothers	WIN, NS, PS5, XBX/S	Original	Brawler	City Connection		
March 19	Star Savior	WIN, iOS, DROID	Original	Action, TBS	STUDIOBSIDE		
March 19	Virtual Ties: Isekaijoucho Musoukyoku	WIN, NS, PS4	Original	Visual novel	Kamitsubaki Studio	Entergram	
March 19	Voidwrought	PS5, XBX/S	Port	Metroidvania, Action, Platformer	Powersnake	Kwalee	
March 20	Ghost Master: Resurrection	WIN, NS, PS5, XBX/S	Remake, Full release	Puzzle, Strategy	Mechano Story Studio	Strategy First	
March 20	Mamon King	PS5	Port	Raising sim	LiTMUS		
March 23	The Seven Deadly Sins: Origin	iOS, DROID	Port	Action RPG	Netmarble F&C	Netmarble	
March 24	Ariana and the Elder Codex (WW)	NS, PS4, PS5	Original	Action RPG	HYDE	Idea Factory International	
March 24	Dissidia Duellum Final Fantasy	iOS, DROID	Original	Fighting	Square Enix, NHN PlayArt	Square Enix	
March 25	Absolum	XBX/S	Port	Brawler	Guard Crush Games, Supamonks	Dotemu	
March 25	Damon and Baby	WIN, NS, PS4, PS5	Original	Action-adventure	Arc System Works		
March 25	Disney Dreamlight Valley – Nintendo Switch 2 Edition	NS2	Port	Life sim, Adventure	Gameloft Montreal	Gameloft	
March 25	Mado Monogatari: Fia and the Wondrous Academy	WIN	Port	Dungeon crawl, RPG	Sting Entertainment, D4 Enterprise	Idea Factory International	
March 26	Cookie Run: OvenSmash	iOS, DROID	Original	Action	Press A	Devsisters	
March 26	Curse Warrior (JP)	NS, PS4, PS5	Original	Dungeon crawl, RPG	GuruGuru	Nippon Ichi Software	
March 26	Easy Delivery Co.	NS, PS5, XBX/S, iOS, DROID	Port	Vehicle sim	Sam C.	Oro Interactive	
March 26	Etrange Overlord	WIN, NS, PS4, PS5	Original	Action-adventure	Gemdrops	JP: Broccoli; WW: NIS America	
March 26	goHELLgo Gou: Tsukiotoshitego (JP)	WIN, NS, PS4	Remaster	RPG	Entergram		
March 26	Hyperdevotion Noire: Goddess Black Heart (AS)	NS	Port	Tactical RPG	Compile Heart, Sting Entertainment	eastasiasoft	
March 26	Kena: Bridge of Spirits	NS2	Port	Action-adventure	Ember Lab		
March 26	Life Is Strange: Reunion	WIN, PS5, XBX/S	Original	Adventure	Deck Nine	Square Enix	
March 26	The Midnight Walk	NS2	Port	Adventure	MoonHood	Fast Travel Games	
March 26	Neopets: Mega Mini Games Collection	WIN, NS, PS5	Compilation	Minigame	No Gravity Games	Bolt Production International	
March 26	New Super Lucky's Tale	PS5	Port	Platformer	Playful Studios	PQube	
March 26	Nutmeg!	WIN	Original	Deck building, Simulation	Sumo Digital Academy	Secret Mode	
March 26	Okayu Nyumu! R (JP)	WIN, NS, PS4	Original	Visual novel	Entergram		
March 26	Otome Daoshi: Fighting for Love (WW)	NS	Original	Otome, Visual novel	Idea Factory, Otomate	Aksys Games	
March 26	Roco Kingdom (CN)	WIN, iOS, DROID	Port	Monster tamer, MMO	Morefun Studios	Tencent Games	
March 26	Screamer	WIN, PS5, XBX/S	Original	Racing	Milestone		
March 26	Space Warlord Baby Trading Simulator	XBX/S	Port	Business sim	Strange Scaffold	Strange Scaffold, Frosty Pop	
March 26	Super Mario Bros. Wonder – Nintendo Switch 2 Edition + Meetup in Bellabel Park	NS2	Port + Expansion	Platformer	Nintendo EPD	Nintendo	
March 26	Taito Milestones 4	NS	Compilation	—N/a	Hamster Corporation	JP: Taito; WW: Clear River Games	
March 26	Virtua Fighter 5 R.E.V.O. World Stage	NS2	Port	Fighting	Ryu Ga Gotoku Studio	Sega	
March 26	Way of the Hunter 2	WIN	Early access	Adventure	Nine Rocks Games	THQ Nordic	
March 26	Winning Post 10 2026 (JP)	WIN, NS, NS2, PS4, PS5	Original	Sports, Simulation	Koei Tecmo		
March 27	Marvel MaXimum Collection	WIN, NS, PS5, XBX/S	Compilation	Brawler	Limited Run Games, Software Creations, Konami, Data East	Limited Run Games	
March 27	Mega Man Star Force Legacy Collection	WIN, NS, PS4, PS5, XBO, XBX/S	Compilation	Action RPG	Capcom		
March 27	RollerCoaster Tycoon Classic	PS5, XBX/S	Port	CMS	Origin8 Technologies, Graphite Lab	Atari	
March 30	Hozy	WIN, OSX	Original	Cozy	Come On Games	tinyBuild	
March 31	Grime II	WIN, PS5, XBX/S	Original	Metroidvania	Clover Bite	Kwalee	
March 31	Homura: The Crimson Warriors (WW)	NS	Port	Otome, Visual novel	Otomate, Design Factory	Idea Factory International	
March 31	Legacy of Kain: Ascendance	WIN, NS, NS2, PS5, XBX/S	Original	Action-adventure, Platformer	Bit Bot Media	Crystal Dynamics	
March 31	Raccoin: Coin Pusher Roguelike	WIN	Original	Deck building, Roguelike	Doraccoon	Playstack	
March 31	South of Midnight	NS2, PS5	Port	Action-adventure	Compulsion Games	Xbox Game Studios	
March 31	Sprint City	WIN, LIN	Early access	Platformer	Second Stage Studio		
March 31	Super Meat Boy 3D	WIN, NS2, PS5, XBX/S	Original	Platformer	Sluggerfly, Team Meat	Headup Games	

- ← Jan
- Feb
- Mar
- Apr
- May
- Jun
- Jul
- Aug
- Sep
- Oct
- Nov
- Dec
- TBD →

=== April–June ===
Release date	Title	Platform(s)	Type(s)	Genre(s)	Developer(s)	Publisher(s)	Ref.
April 1	Content Warning	NS, NS2, PS5, XBO, XBX/S	Port	Survival horror	Landfall		
April 1	Goat Simulator 3	NS2	Port	Action, Simulation	Coffee Stain North	Coffee Stain Publishing	
April 2	Darwin's Paradox!	WIN, NS2, PS5, XBX/S	Original	Action-adventure, Platformer	ZeDrimeTim	Konami Digital Entertainment	
April 2	Morkull Ascend to the Gods	WIN, NS, PS5, XBX/S	Original	Action	Disaster Games	Dojo System	
April 2	Motionrec	NS, PS5	Port	Puzzle, Action	Handsum	Playism	
April 2	Temtem: Swarm	WIN, PS5	Full release	Action, Roguelike, Bullet hell	Crema, GGTech Studios	Crema	
April 6	The New Denpa Men	NS2	Port	RPG	Genius Sonority		
April 7	People of Note	WIN, NS2, PS5, XBX/S	Original	RPG	Iridium Studios	Annapurna Interactive	
April 7	Road to Vostok	WIN	Early access	FPS, Survival	Road to Vostok		
April 7	Sea of Stars	iOS, DROID	Port	RPG	Sabotage Studio		
April 7	Sigma Star Saga DX	WIN, NS, PS5	Remaster	Shoot 'em up, RPG	WayForward		
April 7	Starfield	PS5	Port	Action RPG	Bethesda Game Studios	Bethesda Softworks	
April 8	ChainStaff	WIN, OSX, NS, PS4, PS5, XBO, XBX/S	Original	Action, Platformer	Mommy's Best Games		
April 8	The Occultist	WIN, PS5, XBX/S	Original	Narrative adventure, Horror (psych)	Daloar	Daedalic Entertainment	
April 8	Pokémon Champions	NS	Original	TBS	The Pokémon Works	JP: The Pokémon Company; WW: Nintendo	
April 8	Samson: A Tyndalston Story	WIN	Original	Action	Liquid Swords		
April 9	Beyond Words	WIN, LIN, NS, PS5, XBX/S	Original	Roguelike, Strategy	MindFuel Games	PQube	
April 9	Faith: The Unholy Trinity	PS5	Port	Survival horror	Airdorf Games	New Blood Interactive	
April 9	Memories Off Sousou: Break out of my shell (JP/AS)	WIN, NS, PS4, PS5	Expansion	Visual novel	Mages		
April 9	Minos	WIN	Original	Roguelike, Strategy, Puzzle	Artificer	Devolver Digital	
April 9	Rose Guns Days Season 1 (WW)	WIN, OSX, LIN	Remaster	Visual novel	07th Expansion	MangaGamer	
April 9	Town of Zoz	WIN	Original	Action RPG	Studio Pixanoh	Balor Games	
April 10	Honor of Kings: World (CN)	WIN	Original	Action RPG	TiMi Studio Group	Tencent Games	
April 10	Tamashika	WIN, NS, PS5, XBX/S	Original	FPS	QuickTequila	EDGLRD	
April 14	Dosa Divas: One Last Meal	WIN, NS, NS2, PS5, XBX/S	Original	RPG	Outerloop Games		
April 14	Hades II	PS5, XBX/S	Port	Roguelike, Dungeon crawl, Action RPG	Supergiant Games		
April 14	Last Flag	WIN	Original	MOBA, Hero shooter, TPS	Night Street Games		
April 14	Overwatch	NS2	Port	Hero shooter, FPS	Blizzard Entertainment		
April 14	Replaced	WIN, XBX/S	Original	Action, Platformer	Sad Cat Studios	Thunderful Publishing	
April 14	Windrose	WIN	Early access	Survival	Kraken Express	Pocketpair	
April 15	Calamity Angels: Special Delivery	WIN	Port	RPG	Compile Heart	Idea Factory International	
April 15	Mongil: Star Dive	WIN, iOS, DROID	Original	Action RPG	Netmarble Monster	Netmarble	
April 16	Bunny Garden 2	WIN, NS	Original	Dating sim	qureate		
April 16	Cthulhu: The Cosmic Abyss	WIN, PS5, XBX/S	Original	Adventure	Big Bad Wolf	Nacon	
April 16	Ereban: Shadow Legacy	PS5, XBX/S	Port	Stealth, Action, Platformer	Baby Robot Games	Selecta Play	
April 16	The Expanse: A Telltale Series	NS	Port	Adventure	Telltale Games, Deck Nine	Telltale Games	
April 16	Gecko Gods	WIN, NS, PS5	Original	Puzzle-platformer	Inresin	Super Rare Originals	
April 16	Ground Zero	WIN, PS5, XBX/S	Original	Survival horror	Malformation Games	Kwalee	
April 16	Mouse: P.I. for Hire	WIN, NS2, PS5, XBX/S	Original	FPS	Fumi Games	PlaySide Publishing	
April 16	Opus: Prism Peak	WIN, OSX, NS, NS2	Original	Adventure	Sigono	Shueisha Games	
April 16	Task Time	WIN	Early access	Party	ReadGraves	Wired Productions	
April 16	Tomodachi Life: Living the Dream	NS	Original	Social sim	Nintendo		
April 16	Under Par Golf Architect	WIN, NS2, PS5, XBX/S	Original	CMS	Broken Arms Games		
April 17	Honor of Kings: World (CN)	iOS, DROID	Port	Action RPG	TiMi Studio Group	Tencent Games	
April 17	Pragmata	WIN, NS2, PS5, XBX/S	Original	Action-adventure	Capcom		
April 20	Pratfall	WIN	Original	Adventure	Quad Head		
April 21	Albion Online	XBX/S	Port	MMORPG	Sandbox Interactive		
April 21	Dragon Quest Smash/Grow	iOS, DROID	Original	Roguelike, RPG	Square Enix		
April 21	Vampire Crawlers: The Turbo Wildcard from Vampire Survivors	WIN, NS, PS5, XBX/S	Original	Deck building (roguelike)	Poncle, Nosebleed Interactive	Poncle	
April 22	Masters of Albion	WIN	Early access	God game, Simulation	22cans		
April 22	Tides of Tomorrow	WIN, PS5, XBX/S	Original	Adventure	DigixArt	Deep Silver	
April 23	Artdink Game Log: Aquanaut's Holiday (JP)	WIN, NS	Port	Adventure, Simulation	Artdink		
April 23	Card & Casino	NS2	Original	Digital tabletop	D3 Publisher		
April 23	Castle of Shikigami 3 (JP)	NS	Port	Bullet hell	Alfa System, Cosmo Machia	Cosmo Machia	
April 23	Elminage ORIGINAL: Priestess of Darkness and The Ring of the Gods (JP)	NS	Port	RPG	OperaHouse	Mebius	
April 23	Kazuma Kaneko's Tsukuyomi	NS	Remaster	Deck building (roguelike)	Colopl		
April 23	Kiln	WIN, PS5, XBX/S	Original	Party, Brawler	Double Fine	Xbox Game Studios	
April 23	Kingdom's Return: Time-Eating Fruit and the Ancient Monster	WIN, NS, NS2, PS5, XBX/S	Original	Action, Strategy	Inti Creates		
April 23	Kristala	WIN, PS5, XBX/S	Full release	Action RPG	Astral Clocktower Studios		
April 23	Kumitantei: Old School Slaughter Episode 1	WIN	Episodic	Visual novel, Deck building, Adventure	Mango Factory	Akupara Games	
April 23	Lorelei and the Laser Eyes – Nintendo Switch 2 Edition	NS2	Port	Puzzle	Simogo	Annapurna Interactive	
April 23	Matsurika no Kei -kEi- Tenmei Kashokuden (JP)	NS	Expansion	Otome, Visual novel	Otomate	Idea Factory	
April 23	Nagi no Koi	NS, PS4	Port	Visual novel	Nutrients	Entergram	
April 23	Neverness to Everness (CN)	WIN, OSX, PS5, iOS, DROID	Original	Action RPG	Hotta Studio	Perfect World Games	
April 23	Puzzle Bobble Everybubble!	WIN	Port	Tile matching, Puzzle	Taito	Arc System Works	
April 23	Sayonara Wild Hearts – Nintendo Switch 2 Edition	NS2	Port	Rhythm	Simogo	Annapurna Interactive	
April 23	Shapez 2	WIN	Full release	Factory sim	tobspr Games		
April 23	Sudden Strike 5	WIN, PS5, XBX/S	Original	RTT	Kite Games	Kalypso Media	
April 23	Titanium Court	WIN, OSX	Original	Tile matching, Roguelike, Tower defense	AP Thomson	Fellow Traveller	
April 23	Until Then	XBX/S	Port	Adventure	Polychroma Games	Maximum Entertainment	
April 24	Anemoi (JP)	WIN	Original	Visual novel	Key	Visual Arts	
April 24	HoloVillage: Our Cozy Days	WIN	Original	Life sim	Roboqlo	Holo Indie	
April 24	Snap & Grab	WIN	Original	Puzzle, Adventure	No Goblin		
April 24	Traysia	WIN, NS, PS4, PS5, XBO, XBX/S	Port	RPG	Telenet Japan	Ratalaika Games, Shinyuden	
April 24	Yunyun Syndrome!? Rhythm Psychosis	WIN	Original	Rhythm, Adventure	WSS Playground, Who You	WSS Playground, Alliance Arts	
April 26	Flock Around	WIN, OSX	Original	Simulation	Secret Plan Games	Secret Plan Games, Outersloth	
April 27	Moomintroll: Winter's Warmth	WIN, OSX, NS	Original	Adventure	Hyper Games	Hyper Games, Kakehashi Games	
April 28	Aphelion	WIN, PS5, XBX/S	Original	Action-adventure	Don't Nod		
April 28	Diablo IV: Lord of Hatred	WIN, PS4, PS5, XBO, XBX/S	Expansion	Action RPG, Hack and slash, Dungeon crawl	Blizzard Entertainment		
April 28	Drill Core	NS, PS5, XBX/S	Port	Strategy	Hungry Couch Games	tinyBuild	
April 28	Elementallis	WIN, OSX, LIN, NS, PS4, PS5, XBO, XBX/S	Original	Action-adventure	AnKae Games	Top Hat Studios	
April 28	Magical Princess	WIN	Original	Raising sim	Neotro, Magi Inc.	Magi Inc.	
April 28	Ys Memoire: Revelations in Celceta (WW)	NS	Port	Action RPG	Nihon Falcom	Xseed Games, Marvelous Europe	
April 29	Ariana and the Elder Codex	WIN	Port	Action RPG	HYDE	Idea Factory International	
April 29	MotoGP 26	WIN, NS, NS2, PS5, XBX/S	Original	Racing	Milestone		
April 29	Neverness to Everness (WW)	WIN, OSX, PS5, iOS, DROID	Original	Action RPG	Hotta Studio	Perfect World Games	
April 29	Possessor(s)	NS2	Port	Action-adventure	Heart Machine	Devolver Digital	
April 30	Amnesia: Rebirth	NS2	Port	Survival horror	Abylight Studios	Frictional Games	
April 30	Bus Bound	WIN, PS5, XBX/S	Original	Vehicle sim	stillalive studios	Saber Interactive	
April 30	The Coma 3: Bloodlines	WIN, PS4, PS5, XBO, XBX/S	Original	Survival horror	Dvora Studio	Headup Games	
April 30	The Grimm Reapress and the Drearytale Monster (JP/AS)	NS, NS2, PS5	Original	Action-adventure	Nippon Ichi Software	Clouded Leopard Entertainment, Nippon Ichi Software	
April 30	Hazard Levels	WIN	Early access	FPS	Wales Interactive		
April 30	Heroes of Might and Magic: Olden Era	WIN	Early access	TBS	Unfrozen	Hooded Horse	
April 30	inKONBINI: One Store. Many Stories	WIN, OSX, NS, NS2, PS5, XBX/S	Original	Narrative adventure, Simulation	Nagai Industries	Beep Japan	
April 30	Invincible VS	WIN, PS5, XBX/S	Original	Fighting	Quarter Up	Skybound Games	
April 30	Monster Crown: Sin Eater	WIN, NS2, PS5, XBX/S	Original	Monster tamer, RPG	Studio Aurum, Red Art Studios	Studio Aurum	
April 30	Mullet MadJack	NS	Port	Roguelike, FPS	Hammer95	Epopeia Games	
April 30	Perennial Dusk: Kinsenka	NS		Visual novel	Frontwing	Bushiroad	
April 30	R-Type DX: Music Encore	WIN, NS, PS4, XBX/S	Port	Shoot 'em up	City Connection		
April 30	Saros	PS5	Original	Action-adventure	Housemarque	Sony Interactive Entertainment	
April 30	Strange Antiquities	PS4, PS5, XBX/S	Port	Adventure	Bad Viking	Iceberg Interactive	
May 1	Bow-wow Battle	WIN	Early access	Party	M. Katsu		
May 1	Constance	NS, PS5, XBX/S	Port	Metroidvania	btf	btf, ByteRockers' Games, Parco Games	
May 1	Die in the Dungeon	WIN, OSX	Full release	Roguelike	Atico Games	HypeTrain Digital, Sidekick Publishing	
May 1	Gambonanza	WIN, OSX, LIN, iOS, DROID	Original	Roguelike	Blukulélé	Sidekick Publishing, Stray Fawn Publishing	
May 5	Motorslice	WIN, PS5, XBX/S	Original	Action-adventure	Regular Studio	Top Hat Studios	
May 5	Wax Heads	WIN, LIN, NS, PS5, XBX/S	Original	Puzzle, Simulation	Patattie Games	Curve Games	
May 7	Alabaster Dawn	WIN, LIN	Early access	Action RPG	Radical Fish Games		
May 7	Kill It with Fire 2	NS	Port	FPS	Casey Donnellan Games	tinyBuild	
May 7	Mixtape	WIN, NS2, PS5, XBX/S	Original	Adventure	Beethoven & Dinosaur	Annapurna Interactive	
May 8	Everything is Crab	WIN	Original	Roguelite	Odd Dreams Digital	Secret Mode	
May 11	Battlestar Galactica: Scattered Hopes	WIN	Original	Roguelike, Strategy	Alt Shift	Dotemu	
May 11	OCTOPinbs	WIN	Original	Party, Social deduction	tri-Ace, Lasengle	Aniplex	
May 12	Call of the Elder Gods	WIN, NS2, PS5, XBX/S	Original	Puzzle, Adventure	Out of the Blue Games	Kwalee	
May 12	Clockwork Ambrosia	WIN	Original	Metroidvania	Realmsoft	Omega Intertainment	
May 12	Directive 8020	WIN, PS5, XBX/S	Original	Survival horror, Interactive film	Supermassive Games		
May 12	Indiana Jones and the Great Circle	NS2	Port	Action-adventure	MachineGames	Bethesda Softworks	
May 14	Hotel Architect	WIN	Full release	CMS	Pathos Interactive	Wired Productions	
May 14	Jack Bros.	NS, NS2	Port	Maze	Atlus		
May 14	Outbound	WIN, NS, NS2, PS5, XBX/S	Original	Adventure	Square Glade Games	Silver Lining Games	
May 14	Perfect Tides: Station to Station	NS	Port	PCA	Three Bees, Click Pulp	Three Bees	
May 14	Söldner-X 2: Final Prototype Definitive Edition	NS	Port	Scrolling shooter (horizontal)	SideQuest Studios	eastasiasoft	
May 14	Space Invaders Virtual Collection	NS, NS2	Port	Fixed Shooter	Taito		
May 14	Subnautica 2	WIN, XBX/S	Early access	Survival, Action-adventure	Unknown Worlds Entertainment	Unknown Worlds Entertainment, Krafton	
May 14	V-Tetris	NS, NS2	Port	Puzzle	Locomotive	Blue Planet Software	
May 14	Vertical Force	NS, NS2	Port	Scrolling shooter (vertical)	Hudson Soft	Nintendo, Hudson Soft	
May 14	Virtual Bowling	NS, NS2	Port	Sports	Athena		
May 14	Virtual Fishing (JP)	NS, NS2	Port	Fishing	Locomotive Corporation	Pack-In-Video	
May 19	Darksiders: Warmastered Edition	PS5, XBX/S	Port	Action-adventure, Hack and slash	Kaiko, Vigil Games	THQ Nordic	
May 19	Forza Horizon 6	WIN, XBX/S	Original	Racing	Playground Games	Xbox Game Studios	
May 19	R-Type Dimensions III	WIN, NS, NS2, PS5, XBX/S	Remake	Shoot 'em up	Kritzelkratz 3000	ININ Games, Tozai Games	
May 20	Phonopolis	WIN, OSX	Original	Puzzle, Adventure	Amanita Design		
May 20	Thick As Thieves	WIN	Original	Stealth, Action	OtherSide Entertainment	Megabit	
May 21	Coffee Talk Tokyo	WIN, NS, NS2, PS5, XBX/S	Original	Visual novel	Toge Productions, Chorus Worldwide	Chorus Worldwide	
May 21	Copa City	WIN, PS5, XBX/S	Original	Business sim	Triple Espresso		
May 21	FZ: Formation Z	WIN, NS2, PS5, XBX/S	Remake	Shoot 'em up	Granzella	City Connection	
May 21	King of Tokyo	WIN, NS, PS5, XBX/S	Original	Digital tabletop	Breakfirst Games	Microids	
May 21	Luna Abyss	WIN, PS5, XBX/S	Original	FPS, Action-adventure, Bullet hell	Kwalee Labs	Kwalee	
May 21	Psyvariar 3	WIN, NS, NS2, PS5, XBX/S	Original	Shoot 'em up	Red Art Studios, Banana Bytes	Success, Red Art Games	
May 21	Q Collection	NS	Compilation	Puzzle	liica	Aksys Games	
May 21	Starbites (WW)	WIN, NS, PS5, XBX/S	Port	RPG	Ikinagames	NIS America	
May 21	Tales of Arise: Beyond the Dawn Edition (JP)	NS2	Port	Action RPG	Bandai Namco Studios	Bandai Namco Entertainment	
May 21	Warhammer 40,000: Mechanicus II	WIN, PS5, XBX/S	Original	TBT	Bulwark Studios	Kasedo Games	
May 21	Yoshi and the Mysterious Book	NS2	Original	Platformer	Nintendo		
May 21	Zero Parades: For Dead Spies	WIN	Original	RPG	ZA/UM		
May 22	Bubsy 4D	WIN, NS, NS2, PS4, PS5, XBO, XBX/S	Original	Platformer	Fabraz	Atari	
May 22	Lego Batman: Legacy of the Dark Knight	WIN, PS5, XBX/S	Original	Action-adventure	Traveller's Tales	Warner Bros. Games	
May 22	Rugrats: Retro Rewind Collection	WIN, NS, PS5	Compilation	Platformer, Action-adventure	Mighty Rabbit Studios	Limited Run Games	
May 22	Tales of Arise: Beyond the Dawn Edition (WW)	NS2	Port	Action RPG	Bandai Namco Studios	Bandai Namco Entertainment	
May 25	Transpawt Train	WIN	Original	Simulation	Orin Soft	Orin Soft	
May 26	Birushana: Winds of Fate (WW)	NS	Original	Otome, Visual novel	Otomate, Red Entertainment	Idea Factory International	
May 26	LumenTale: Memories of Trey	WIN, NS	Original	Monster tamer, RPG	Beehive Studios	Team17	
May 26	MLB The Show Mobile	iOS, DROID	Original	Deck building, Sports	San Diego Studio	Sony Interactive Entertainment	
May 26	Rose and Locket	WIN, OSX	Original	Action-adventure, Run and gun, Platformer	Whistling Wizard	Ninja Kiwi	
May 26	Stonemachia	WIN	Original	Action RPG	Crossfall Games		
May 26	Town to City	WIN	Full release	City builder	Galaxy Grove	Kwalee	
May 26	World of Tanks: Heat	WIN, PS5, XBX/S	Original	Vehicular combat	Wargaming		
May 27	007 First Light	WIN, PS5, XBX/S	Original	Action-adventure	IO Interactive		
May 27	Gobliiins Collection	NS, PS5, XBX/S	Compilation	PCA	Red Art Games	Red Art Studios	
May 27	Poppy Playtime: Chapter 5	NS, PS4, PS5, XBO, XBX/S	Port	Survival horror	Mob Entertainment		
May 28	Amanda the Adventurer 3	NS, NS2, PS4, PS5, XBO, XBX/S	Port	Horror	MANGLEDmaw Games	DreadXP	
May 28	Bluey's Quest for the Gold Pen	WIN, NS, NS2, PS4, PS5, XBX/S	Port	Adventure	Halfbrick Studios	PM Studios	
May 28	Clockfall	WIN	Early access	Roguelike, Action RPG	Rever Games	Radical Theory	
May 28	Crashout Crew	WIN, XBX/S	Original	Party, Action	Aggro Crab		
May 28	Demon Kill Demon: Yomi 1984 (JP)	NS	Original	Dungeon crawl, RPG	Experience		
May 28	Escape the Backrooms	PS5, XBX/S	Port	Horror, Adventure	Fancy Games, Blackbird Interactive	Secret Mode	
May 28	Heavy Metal Death Can	WIN, OSX, LIN	Original	Survival horror	Krufs Productions		
May 28	Lollipop Chainsaw RePOP – Nintendo Switch 2 Edition (JP)	NS2	Port	Action-adventure, Hack and slash	Dragami Games		
May 28	Monochrome Mobius: Rights and Wrongs Forgotten	NS2	Port	RPG	Aquaplus		
May 28	Ova Magica	WIN	Full release	Farming, Monster tamer, RPG	Skinny Frog	Top Hat Studios	
May 28	RollerCoaster Tycoon Classic	NS2, PS4, XBO	Port	CMS	Origin8 Technologies, Graphite Lab	Atari	
May 28	Schrödinger's Call	WIN, NS	Original	Adventure, Visual novel	Acrobatic Chirimenjako	Shueisha Games	
May 28	Stardust: Wish of Witch	WIN	Original	Tactical RPG	Kniv Studio	Kniv Studio, Sologame	
May 28	Story of Seasons: Grand Bazaar	PS5, XBX/S	Port	Farming	Marvelous		
May 28	Stray	NS2	Port	Adventure	BlueTwelve Studio	Annapurna Interactive	
May 28	Touhou Yukkuri Mountain	WIN, NS, NS2	Original	Puzzle	BeXide		
May 28	Utawarerumono: Past and Present Rediscovered	JP: NS2, PS5; WW: WIN	Original	Tactical RPG	Aquaplus	JP: Aquaplus; WW: DMM Games, Shiravune	
May 28	Wall World 2	NS, PS5	Port	Action, Roguelite, Tower defense	Alawar		
May 29	Little Nightmares II Enhanced Edition	NS2	Port	Puzzle-platformer, Survival horror, Adventure	Supermassive Games, Tarsier Studios	Bandai Namco Entertainment	
May 29	Mina the Hollower	WIN, NS, NS2, PS4, PS5, XBO, XBX/S	Original	Action-adventure	Yacht Club Games		
June 1	BrokenLore: Follow	WIN, PS5, XBX/S	Original	Horror	Serafini Productions		
June 2	Fatekeeper	WIN	Early access	Action RPG	Paraglacial	THQ Nordic	
June 3	eFootball Kick-Off!	NS2	Original	Sports (Soccer)	Konami Digital Entertainment		
June 3	Final Fantasy VII Rebirth	NS2, XBX/S	Port	Action RPG	Square Enix		
June 3	System Shock 2: 25th Anniversary Remaster – Nintendo Switch 2 Edition	NS2	Port	FPS, Action RPG	Nightdive Studios		
June 4	The 7th Guest Remake	WIN, PS5, XBX/S	Remake	Interactive film, Puzzle, Adventure	Exkee	Vertigo Games	
June 4	A-Train 9 Evolution (JP)	NS2	Remaster	Business sim	Artdink		
June 4	Crazy Cha!n: Elpis no Kusari (JP)	NS	Original	Otome, Visual novel	Otomate	Idea Factory	
June 4	Donkey Kong 64	NS, NS2	Port	Platformer	Rare	Nintendo	
June 4	Goals	WIN, OSX, PS5, XBX/S	Original	Sports (soccer)	Goals AB		
June 4	River City Saga: Journey to the West	WIN, NS, PS5	Original	Brawler	UnitePlus	Arc System Works	
June 4	Tetris: The Grand Master 4 – Absolute Eye	NS	Port	Puzzle	Arika		
June 5	Gothic 1 Remake	WIN, PS5, XBX/S	Remake	Action RPG	Alkimia Interactive	THQ Nordic	
June 6	Momento	WIN, OSX	Original	Adventure	Fat Alien Cat, Nomo Studio		
June 7	2 Fights in 2 Tight Spaces	WIN	Early access	Deckbuilder, Strategy	Ground Shatter		
June 7	Exo Rally Championship	WIN	Original	Racing	Exbleative	Future Friends Games	
June 7	Terrinoth: Heroes of Descent	WIN, OSX, PS5, XBX/S	Original	Tactical RPG	Artefacts Studio	New Tales	
June 7	Where Winds Meet	XBX/S	Port	Action-adventure, RPG	Everstone Studio	NetEase Games	
June 8	Sea of Stars	NS2	Port	RPG	Sabotage Studio		
June 9	Atelier Yumia: The Alchemist of Memories & the Envisioned Land – Nintendo Switch 2 Edition	NS2	Port	Action RPG	Gust	Koei Tecmo	
June 9	Bellwright	PS5, XBX/S	Early access	Survival	Donkey Crew	Donkey Crew, Snail	
June 9	Inazuma Eleven: Cross (JP)	iOS, DROID	Original	RPG, Sports (football)	Aiming, Level-5	Level-5	
June 9	NBA The Run	WIN, PS5, XBX/S	Original	Sports	Play by Play Studios		
June 9	Rise of the Tomb Raider: 20 Year Celebration	NS2	Port	Action-adventure	Crystal Dynamics	Aspyr	
June 9	Road to Empress II	WIN, iOS, DROID	Original	Adventure	New One Studio		
June 9	SnowRunner	NS2	Port	Simulation	Saber Interactive	Focus Entertainment	
June 9	Thomas & Friends: Wonders of Sodor	NS	Port	Adventure, Simulation	Dovetail Games		
June 9	Voidling Bound	WIN	Original	TPS, Action	Hatchery Games		
June 9	Xenoblade Chronicles: Definitive Edition – Nintendo Switch 2 Edition	NS2	Remaster	Action RPG	Monolith Soft	Nintendo	
June 10	33 Immortals	WIN, XBX/S	Full release	Action, Roguelike	Thunder Lotus Games		
June 10	Beatdown City Survivors	WIN, XBO, XBX/S	Original	Bullet heaven	NuChallenger		
June 10	Meccha Chameleon	WIN	Original	Casual	Lemorion 1224		
June 11	Frog Sqwad	WIN, XBX/S	Original	Party, Puzzle-platformer	Panic Stations		
June 11	Mousebusters	WIN, OSX, LIN	Original	Action-adventure, Horror	Odencat		
June 11	FIFA World Cup: Launch Edition	iOS, DROID	Original	Sports	Delphi Interactive	Netflix Games	
June 11	Powerful Pro Baseball 2026-2027 (JP)	NS, PS4	Original	Sports	Konami Digital Entertainment		
June 11	Sportal	WIN, NS, PS4, PS5, XBO, XBX/S	Original	FPS, Roguelike	Sleepwalking Potatoes	Retrovibe	
June 11	Starseeker: Astroneer Expeditions	WIN, NS2, PS5, XBX/S	Early access	Adventure	System Era Softworks	Devolver Digital	
June 11	Tales of Seikyu	WIN	Full release	Farming, Adventure	ACE Entertainment	Fireshine Games	
June 11	to a T	NS2	Port	Puzzle, Adventure	uvula	Annapurna Interactive	
June 11	Unrailed 2: Back on Track	WIN, OSX, NS, NS2, PS5	Full release	Action	Indoor Astronaut	Indoor Astronaut, Kepler Ghost	
June 16	Demeo x Dungeons & Dragons: Battlemarked	NS2	Port	Strategy, Adventure, RPG	Resolution Games		
June 16	Junkster	WIN, NS2, PS5, XBX/S	Original	Action, Platformer	Stormcloud Games		
June 17	Pokémon Champions	iOS, DROID	Port	TBS	The Pokémon Works	The Pokémon Company	
June 17	Whisper of the House	NS	Port	Puzzle, Simulation	Yuanqi Bomb Studio		
June 18	The Adventures of Elliot: The Millennium Tales	WIN, NS2, PS5, XBX/S	Original	Action RPG	Square Enix, Claytechworks	Square Enix	
June 18	and Roger	NS2, iOS, DROID	Port	Adventure, Visual novel	TearyHand Studio	Kodansha	
June 18	Forgotlings	PS5, XBX/S	Port	Action-adventure	Throughline Games	Hitcents	
June 18	Observer: System Redux	NS2	Port	Horror	Bloober Team		
June 18	Parking Garage Rally Circuit	NS	Port	Racing	Walaber Entertainment	Pineapple Works	
June 18	R-Type Tactics I • II Cosmos (WW)	WIN, NS, NS2, PS4, PS5, XBX/S	Remake, Compilation	TBS, Tactical RPG, Shoot 'em up	Granzella Game Studios	NIS America	
June 18	Soccer Kid Collection	WIN, NS, PS4, PS5, XBO, XBX/S	Compilation	Platformer	QUByte Interactive	QUByte Interactive, Bleem!, Piko Interactive	
June 18	UsoNatsu: The Summer Romance Bloomed From A Lie	NS	Port	Visual novel	LYCORIS	Prototype	
June 19	EA Sports UFC 6	PS5, XBX/S	Original	Fighting, Sports	EA Vancouver	EA Sports	
June 19	Maseylia: Echoes of the Past	WIN, LIN	Original	Metroidvania	Sol Brothers		
June 22	SAND: Raiders of Sophie	WIN	Original	Extraction shooter	Hologryph, TowerHaus	tinyBuild	
June 23	Deer & Boy	WIN, NS, PS5, XBX/S	Original	Cinematic platformer, Adventure	Lifeline Games	Dear Villagers	
June 23	Destroy All Humans!	NS2	Port	Action-adventure	Black Forest Games	THQ Nordic	
June 23	Devil May Cry 5: Devil Hunter Edition	NS2	Port	Action-adventure, Hack and slash	Capcom		
June 23	Moldwasher	WIN	Original	Adventure	Rubel Games	Anshar Publishing	
June 23	Sonic Frontiers: Definitive Edition	NS2	Port	Platformer, Action-adventure	Sonic Team	Sega	
June 23	Wanderstop	NS, NS2	Port	Life sim, Adventure	Ivy Road	Annapurna Interactive	
June 24	Deltarune: Chapter 5	WIN, OSX, NS, NS2, PS4, PS5	Episode	RPG, Adventure	Toby Fox, 8-4 (Consoles)		
June 24	Empulse	WIN, PS5, XBX/S	Early access	FPS	1047 Games		
June 24	The Necromancer's Tale	NS2, PS5, XBX/S	Port	RPG	Psychic Software	Silver Lining Interactive	
June 25	Abyssus	PS5, XBX/S	Port	FPS, Roguelike	DoubleMoose	The Arcade Crew	
June 25	Catto's Post Office	NS	Port	Adventure	In Shambles Studio		
June 25	Citizen Sleeper	NS2	Port	RPG	Jump Over the Age	Fellow Traveller	
June 25	Citizen Sleeper 2: Starward Vector	NS2	Port	RPG	Jump Over the Age	Fellow Traveller	
June 25	Dead or Alive 6 Last Round	WIN, PS5, XBX/S	Remaster	Fighting	Team Ninja	Koei Tecmo	
June 25	Flesh Made Fear	PS5	Port	Survival horror	Tainted Pact Games	Assemble Entertainment	
June 25	Gecko Gods	NS2	Port	Puzzle-platformer	Inresin	Super Rare Originals	
June 25	Mousebusters	NS, XBO	Port	Action-adventure, Horror	Odencat		
June 25	My Merry May with be (JP)	NS, PS4	Remaster, Compilation	Visual novel	Mages, KID	Mages	
June 25	Namco Legendary Mountains	WIN, OSX, NS, NS2	Original	Puzzle	BeXide		
June 25	Saeko: Giantess Dating Sim	NS	Port	Adventure, Visual novel	Safe Havn	Hyper Real	
June 25	Star Fox	NS2	Remake	Shoot 'em up (rail)	Velan Studios	Nintendo	
June 25	Tevi: Fauna Arcana	WIN	Expansion	Metroidvania, Bullet hell	CreSpirit, GemaYue	CreSpirit	
June 25	Villion: Code (JP)	NS, NS2, PS4, PS5	Original	RPG	Compile Heart		
June 28	Ninja Master's: The Scroll of the Ninja Emperor	WIN	Remaster	Fighting	Code Mystics	SNK	
June 29	Dokapon 3-2-1 Super Collection! (WW)	WIN	Port	RPG	Sting Entertainment		
June 30	Deathbulge: Battle of the Bands	NS, PS4, PS5, XBO, XBX/S	Port	RPG	Deathbulge, Five Houses		
June 30	Momento	NS, NS2, PS5, XBX/S	Port	Adventure	Fat Alien Cat, Nomo Studio	Silver Lining Interactive	
June 30	Monopoly: Star Wars Heroes vs. Villains	WIN, NS, NS2, PS5, XBX/S	Original	Digital tabletop	Behaviour Interactive	Ubisoft	
June 30	RV There Yet?	XBX/S	Port	Adventure	Nuggets Entertainment		
June 30	Vixen 357 (WW)	GEN	Rerelease	Tactical RPG	Shinyuden	Masaya Games, Shinyuden	

- ← Jan
- Feb
- Mar
- Apr
- May
- Jun
- Jul
- Aug
- Sep
- Oct
- Nov
- Dec
- TBD →

=== July–September ===
Release date	Title	Platform(s)	Type(s)	Genre(s)	Developer(s)	Publisher(s)	Ref.
July 2	Ganbare Goemon! Daishuugou! (JP)	WIN, NS, PS5	Compilation	Action-adventure, RPG, Puzzle	Konami Digital Entertainment		
July 2	Rhythm Heaven Groove	NS	Original	Rhythm	Nintendo EPD, TNX	Nintendo	
July 3	Ao Oni	PS5	Port	Horror, RPG	Game Studio		
July 3	Undergrounded	WIN	Original	Puzzle, Adventure	Game Studio	room6	
July 6	XeGrader plus	WIN, LIN	Remake	Puzzle, Shoot 'em up	Tokihiro NAITO		
July 7	Doom: The Dark Ages — Revelations	WIN, PS5, XBX/S	Expansion	FPS	id Software	Bethesda Softworks	
July 7	Dr. Mario & Puzzle League	NS, NS2	Port	Puzzle	Nintendo R&D1	Nintendo	
July 7	Escape the Backrooms	NS2	Port	Horror, Adventure	Fancy Games, Blackbird Interactive	Secret Mode	
July 7	Fortified Zone	NS, NS2	Port	Action	Jaleco		
July 7	Moonlight Peaks	WIN, NS, NS2	Original	Life sim	Little Chicken Game Company	Xseed Games, Marvelous Europe	
July 7	The Sword of Hope	NS, NS2	Port	RPG	Kemco	JP: Kemco; NA: Seika Corporation	
July 7	Wario Land: Super Mario Land 3	NS, NS2	Port	Platformer	Nintendo R&D1	Nintendo	
July 8	Buckshot Roulette	XBO, XBX/S	Port	Digital tabletop, Horror	Mike Klubnika	Critical Reflex	
July 9	Assassin's Creed Black Flag Resynced	WIN, PS5, XBX/S	Remake	Action-adventure	Ubisoft Singapore	Ubisoft	
July 9	Backyard Baseball	WIN, OSX, NS, PS5, XBX/S	Original	Sports	Mega Cat Studios	Playground Productions	
July 9	Call of Duty: Black Ops	PS4, PS5	Port	FPS	Treyarch, Iron Galaxy	Activision	
July 9	Call of Duty: Black Ops II	PS4, PS5	Port	FPS	Treyarch, Iron Galaxy	Activision	
July 9	Digimon Story: Time Stranger (JP)	NS, NS2	Port	RPG	Media.Vision	Bandai Namco Entertainment	
July 9	EA Sports College Football 27	WIN, PS5, XBX/S	Original	Sports	EA Orlando	EA Sports	
July 9	Echoes of Aincrad (JP)	WIN, PS5, XBX/S	Original	Action RPG	Game Studio	Bandai Namco Entertainment	
July 9	Granblue Fantasy: Relink – Endless Ragnarok	WIN, NS2, PS4, PS5	Port (NS2) + Expansion	Action RPG	Cygames Osaka	Cygames	
July 9	Gunvolt Chronicles: Luminous Avenger iX 1+2 Dual Collection	WIN, NS, NS2, PS5	Compilation	Action, Platformer	Inti Creates		
July 9	Magical Girl Witch Trials (JP)	NS	Port	Adventure, Visual novel	Acacia	Re,AER	
July 9	Space Warlord Baby Trading Simulator	NS, NS2	Port	Business sim	Strange Scaffold	Strange Scaffold, Frosty Pop	
July 9	Tokyo Valkyries	WIN, NS	Original	Deck building	qureate		
July 10	Digimon Story: Time Stranger (WW)	NS, NS2	Port	RPG	Media.Vision	Bandai Namco Entertainment	
July 10	Echoes of Aincrad (WW)	WIN, PS5, XBX/S	Original	Action RPG	Game Studio	Bandai Namco Entertainment	
July 10	Palworld	WIN, PS5, XBO, XBX/S	Full release	Action-adventure, Survival, Monster tamer	Pocketpair		
July 10	Wuthering Waves	XBX/S	Port	Action RPG	Kuro Games		
July 13	The Alters: Last Variable	WIN, PS5, XBX/S	Expansion	Survival	11 Bit Studios		
July 13	Ascend to Zero	WIN, XBX/S	Original	Roguelike, Action	Flyway Games	Flyway Games, Krafton	
July 13	Octopath Traveler (JP)	NS2	Port	RPG	Acquire, Square Enix	Square Enix	
July 13	Octopath Traveler II (JP)	NS2	Port	RPG	Acquire, Square Enix	Square Enix	
July 14	D-topia	WIN, NS, NS2, PS5, XBX/S	Original	Puzzle, Adventure	Marumittu Games	Annapurna Interactive	
July 14	Hell Clock	PS5, XBX/S	Port	Action, Roguelike	Rogue Snail	Mad Mushroom	
July 14	Starbites	NS2	Port	RPG	Ikinagames	NIS America	
July 15	Cozy Grove: Camp Spirit	WIN, NS, NS2, PS4, PS5, XBO, XBX/S	Port	Life sim	Spry Fox		
July 15	Denshattack!	WIN, NS2, PS5, XBX/S	Original	Platformer	Undercoders	Fireshine Games	
July 15	Digimon UP	iOS, DROID	Original	RPG	Bandai Namco Entertainment		
July 15	The Mound: Omen of Cthulhu	WIN, PS5, XBX/S	Original	Horror, Action-adventure	ACE Team	Nacon	
July 15	Star Ocean: The Second Story R	NS2	Port	Action RPG	Gemdrops	Square Enix	
July 15	Teeto	WIN, NS, NS2, PS5	Original	Platformer	Eat Pant Games	Super Rare Originals	
July 16	70s-style Robot Anime Geppy-X	WIN, NS, PS4, PS5, XBX/S	Remaster	Scrolling shooter (horizontal)	Implicit Conversions, Aroma	Bliss Brain	
July 16	Culdcept Begins	NS, NS2	Original	TBS, DCCG	Neos		
July 16	eBaseball: Pro Spirit 2026	WIN, PS5	Original	Sports, Simulation	Konami Digital Entertainment		
July 16	Full Stride	WIN, PS5	Original	Racing (sim)	Blue Bullet		
July 16	Go-Go Town!	WIN, NS, NS2	Full release	City builder	Prideful Sloth	CULT Games	
July 16	Heave Ho 2	WIN, NS, NS2	Original	Party	Le Cartel	Devolver Digital	
July 16	Hell Maiden	WIN	Early access	Deck building, Roguelike, Bullet heaven	AstralShift		
July 16	K-pop Idol Stories: Road to Debut	WIN, NS, PS5, XBX/S	Original	Simulation	Wisageni Studio	PQube	
July 16	Kyoto Xanadu (JP/AS)	WIN, NS, NS2, PS5	Original	Action RPG	Nihon Falcom		
July 16	The Mermaid Mask	WIN, OSX, NS, NS2, PS5	Original	PCA	SFB Games		
July 16	Moss: The Forgotten Relic	WIN, NS, NS2, PS5, XBX/S	Remaster, Compilation	Puzzle, Adventure	Polyarc		
July 16	Puppergeist	WIN, NS, XBX/S	Original	Rhythm, Visual novel	Serenity Forge		
July 16	Sins of Kaleido	NS	Original	Otome, Visual novel	AmuLit	Voltage	
July 16	Storebound	WIN	Full release	Horror, Puzzle	Embers		
July 16	Wreck Runners	WIN, LIN, PS5, XBX/S	Original	Extraction shooter	Disruptive Games		
July 21	Fading Echo	WIN	Original	Action-adventure	Emeteria	New Tales	
July 21	Ova Magica	NS, PS4, PS5, XBO, XBX/S	Port	Farming, Monster tamer, RPG	Skinny Frog	Top Hat Studios	
July 21	The Planet Crafter	PS5, XBX/S	Port	Survival	Miju Games		
July 22	The Dream Of A Cockspur	WIN	Original	Horror, PCA	roccay	Playism	
July 22	Lifted	WIN, NS2, PS5	Original	Platformer, Puzzle	Adventure Works		
July 22	Shift At Midnight	WIN, XBX/S	Original	Horror	Bun Muen	Kwalee	
July 22	Tears of Metal	WIN	Early access	Action, Roguelike, Hack and slash	Paper Cult		
July 23	The Angel Next Door Spoils Me Rotten: Memorial Vacation (JP)	NS, NS2	Original	Visual novel	Mages		
July 23	Avatar Legends: The Fighting Game	WIN, NS, NS2, PS5	Original	Fighting	Gameplay Group	PM Studios	
July 23	Cultic	NS2, PS5, XBX/S	Port	Horror, FPS	Jasozz Games	3D Realms	
July 23	Dinoblade	WIN	Original	Action RPG	Team Spino LLC		
July 23	Disgaea Mayhem (WW)	WIN, NS, NS2, PS5	Port	Action RPG	Nippon Ichi Software	NIS America	
July 23	Dodo Duckie!	WIN, LIN, XBX/S	Original	Puzzle-platformer	BornMonkie	SoloGame	
July 23	DragonSword: Awakening	WIN	Rerelease	Action RPG	Hound13		
July 23	Final Fantasy X/X-2 HD Remaster	NS2	Port	RPG	Square Enix		
July 23	Gurei	WIN, NS, PS5	Original	Action, Platformer	Lobo Sagaz Studio	Astrolabe Games	
July 23	Hard Edge: War Zone	WIN	Remake	Deck building, TBS	Sunsoft		
July 23	Hololive Dreams	WIN, iOS, DROID	Original	Rhythm	Cover Corporation, QualiArts		
July 23	Splatoon Raiders	NS2	Original	TPS	Nintendo EPD	Nintendo	
July 23	Staffer Retro: A Supernatural Mystery Quest	WIN	Original	Adventure	Team Tetrapod	Team Tetrapod, GamePia	
July 23	Valkyrie Tune: Synthesis of Souls	WIN	Original	Visual novel	Frontwing	Good Smile Company	
July 24	An Eggstremely Hard Game	WIN	Original	Puzzle-platformer	BBear Studio	Devotion Interactive	
July 24	Kazuma Kaneko's Tsukuyomi	WIN	Port	Deck building	Colopl		
July 26	Suika Game	WIN, PS5	Port	Puzzle	Aladdin X		
July 26	Suika Game Planet	WIN, PS5	Port	Puzzle	Aladdin X		
July 27	Dystopicon	WIN	Original	Life sim	Palitroque		
July 27	Forever Skies	XBX/S	Port	Action, Survival	Far From Home		
July 27	Prelude: Dark Pain	WIN	Early access	Tactical RPG	Quickfire Games	Firesquid	
July 27	Unbeatable	NS2	Port	Rhythm, Adventure	D-Cell Games	Playstack	
July 28	EverQuest Legends	WIN	Remake	MMORPG	Game Jawn	Daybreak Game Company	
July 28	Halo: Campaign Evolved	WIN, PS5, XBX/S	Remake	FPS	Halo Studios	Xbox Game Studios	
July 28	Go North	WIN, OSX, XBX/S	Original	Adventure	gazuntype		
July 28	Gothic Classic	PS4, PS5, XBO, XBX/S	Port	Action RPG	Piranha Bytes	THQ Nordic	
July 28	Harvest Moon: The Lost Valley / Harvest Moon: Skytree Village	iOS, DROID	Compilation	Farming	Natsume Inc.		
July 29	BloodRayne: Definitive Collection	NS	Compilation	Action, Hack and slash	Ziggurat Interactive	Strictly Limited Games	
July 29	Bokura	NS2	Port	Puzzle	Tokoronyori, Action-adventure	Kodansha	
July 29	Company of Heroes 3: Final Stand	WIN	Original	Roguelite, Strategy	Relic Entertainment		
July 29	Dispatch	XBX/S	Port	Adventure	AdHoc Studio		
July 29	Fuga: Melodies of Steel	iOS, DROID	Port	Tactical role-playing	CyberConnect2		
July 29	The King Is Watching	NS, PS5, XBX/S	Port	RTS, Roguelike	Hypnohead	tinyBuild	
July 29	Lunarium	WIN	Original	Action RPG	Lunarium Game Studio	Imperfect Games	
July 29	Mistfall Hunter	WIN, PS5, XBX/S	Original	Extraction shooter, Action RPG	Bellring Games	Skystone Games	
July 29	Truck-kun is Supporting Me from Another World?!	WIN, XBX/S	Original	Vehicular combat	Strange Scaffold	Frosty Pop	
July 30	Aretha Collection 1993-1995 (JP)	NS, PS4, PS5	Compilation	RPG	Japan Art Media, Edia	Edia	
July 30	Blue Reflection Quartet (Note: Includes remastered versions of Blue Reflection and Blue Reflection: Second Light, a new game adaptation of the Blue Reflection Ray anime, and a console remake of the mobile game Blue Reflection Sun.)	WIN, NS, NS2, PS5	Compilation (Note: Consists of an original release, 2 remasters and a remake)	RPG	Gust	Koei Tecmo	
July 30	Constance	NS2	Port	Metroidvania	btf	btf, ByteRockers' Games, Parco Games	
July 30	JP: Culdcept The First; WW: Culdcept The First Saturn Tribute	JP: NS, PS5, XBX/S; WW: WIN	Remaster	TBS, DCCG	City Connection	JP: Neos; City Connection	
July 30	Dungeon Antiqua	NS, PS5, XBX/S	Port	Dungeon crawl, RPG	Shiromofu Factory	AMATA Games	
July 30	Exstetra (WW)	WIN	Remaster	RPG	FuRyu, Studio Saizensen	FuRyu	
July 30	Fantasy Maiden Wars: Dream of the Stray Dreamer (WW)	NS	Port	Tactical RPG	Sanbondo	Phoenixx	
July 30	Ira	NS2	Port	Roguelike, Shoot 'em up	ABShot	Nicalis, Pikii	
July 30	Jurassic World Evolution 2: Complete Edition	NS2	Port	CMS	Frontier Developments		
July 30	Kinki Spiritual Affairs Bureau	NS2	Port	Horror, Action	Noto Muteki	AMATA Games	
July 30	Kusan: City of Wolves	WIN, NS, PS5, XBX/S	Original	Shoot 'em up	CIRCLEfromDOT	PQube	
July 30	Leafy Corner	WIN, OSX, NS, PS5, XBO, XBX/S	Original	Cozy, Simulation	Fireline Games		
July 30	Lumines Remastered	iOS, DROID	Port	Puzzle	Resonair	Enhance Games	
July 30	Machine Party	WIN, LIN	Original	Party	Mike Klubnika	Oro Interactive	
July 30	Neko Odyssey	NS	Port	Adventure	Secret Character	Flyhigh Works	
July 30	Rose Guns Days Season 2 (WW)	WIN, OSX, LIN	Remaster	Visual novel	07th Expansion	MangaGamer	
July 30	Signy & Mino: Against All Gods	WIN	Original	RPG	AN Productions	Armor Games Studios	
July 30	Sponge Break	WIN	Original	Adventure	Goose Byte	Balor Games	
July 30	Truxton Extreme	WIN, NS2, PS5, XBX/S	Original	Shoot 'em up	Tatsujin	Clear River Games	
July 30	Turnip Mountain	WIN, NS, NS2, PS4, PS5, XBX/S	Original	Adventure	Luke Sanderson	JanduSoft	
July 30	Verho: Curse of Faces	NS, PS5, XBX/S	Port	Action RPG	Kasur Games	CobraTekku Games	
July 30	Village in the Shade (JP)	WIN, NS, NS2, PS5	Original	Life sim, Adventure	Nippon Ichi Software		
July 30	Voidtrain	PS5	Port	FPS, Survival	HypeTrain Digital		
July 30	Volcano Princess	NS, PS5, iOS, DROID	Port	Raising sim, RPG	Egg Hatcher	Colorful Palette	
July 30	Xenoblade Chronicles 2 – Nintendo Switch 2 Edition	NS2	Remaster	Action RPG	Monolith Soft	Nintendo	
July 31	Batman: Caped Crusader – Chronicles	Luna	Original	Party	Amazon Game Studios		
July 31	Corsair Cove	WIN	Original	City builder	Limbic Entertainment	Hooded Horse	
July 31	The Relic: First Guardian	WIN, PS5	Original	Action RPG	Project Cloud Games	Perp Games	
July 31	Sephiria	WIN	Full release	Roguelike	Team Horay		
August 3	My Merry May with be (JP)	WIN	Port	Visual novel	Mages, KID	Mages	
August 4	Beast of Reincarnation	WIN, PS5, XBX/S	Original	Action RPG	Game Freak	Fictions	
August 4	Big Walk	WIN, OSX, NS2, PS5	Original	Adventure	House House	Panic Inc.	
August 4	Dragon Hopper	NS, NS2 (Note: Completed in 1996, released as part of the Nintendo Classics service)	Original	Action-adventure	Intelligent Systems	Nintendo	
August 4	Final Fantasy XIV	NS2	Port	MMORPG	Square Enix		
August 4	Kynseed	NS, PS4, PS5, XBO, XBX/S	Port	Life sim, RPG, Sandbox	PixelCount Studios		
August 4	Zero Racers	NS, NS2	Original	Racing	Nintendo		
August 5	Akatori	WIN	Original	Metroidvania	Contrast Games	Games Harbor, Esprit Games	
August 5	Lost & Found: A This Bed We Made Story	WIN	Original	Adventure	Lowbirth Games		
August 5	Parkasaurus: Dinoluxe Edition	NS2, PS5, XBX/S	Port	Business sim, CMS	Washbear Studio		
August 6	Ao Oni 2	WIN, NS	Port	Horror, RPG	Game Studio		
August 6	Capy Castaway	WIN, OSX	Original	Narrative adventure	Kitten Cup Studio	Big Blue Sky Games	
August 6	Changeable Guardian Estique	WIN, NS, PS5, XBX/S	Port	Scrolling shooter (horizontal)	Cat Hui Trading	AMATA Games	
August 6	Cotton Rock with You: Oriental Night Dreams (JP)	WIN, NS2, PS5	Original	Shooter	Success		
August 6	Doloc Town	WIN	Full release	Farming, Adventure	RedSaw Games Studio	Logoi Games	
August 6	Echobreaker	WIN	Original	Action, Platformer	Upstream Arcade	Weekend Games	
August 6	Iron Nest	WIN	Original	Simulation	Nick Nieuwoudt, Dominik Latos		
August 6	Is This Seat Taken?	PS5	Port	Puzzle	Poti Poti Studio	Wholesome Games	
August 6	The Legend of Dark Witch Episode 4	PS5	Port	Action	Inside System		
August 6	Lies of P: Complete Edition	NS2	Port	Soulslike	Neowiz, Round8 Studio	Neowiz	
August 6	Marvel Tokon: Fighting Souls	WIN, PS5	Original	Fighting	Arc System Works	Sony Interactive Entertainment	
August 6	Montabi	WIN, OSX, NS, NS2, XBO, XBX/S	Original	Deck building, Roguelike	Mankibo	Akupara Games	
August 6	Monsters are Coming! Rock & Road	XBX/S	Port	Roguelite, Survival, Tower defense	Ludogram	Raw Fury	
August 6	Obakeidoro 2: Chase & Seek (WW)	NS, NS2	Original	Action	Free Style		
August 6	ReStory	WIN	Original	Simulation	Mandragora	tinyBuild	
August 6	Tensei Game: Karma x Cross (JP)	NS	Original	Digital tabletop	Any, ArtePiazza	ArtePiazza	
August 7	Expeditions: Samurai	WIN	Early access	Tactical RPG	Campfire Cabal	THQ Nordic	
August 7	Suikoden: Star Leap (JP)	iOS, DROID	Original	RPG	Mythril	Konami Digital Entertainment	
August 8	1998: The Toll Keeper Story	PS5	Port	Narrative adventure, Simulation	GameChanger Studio	GameChanger Studio, CC_Games, Beep Japan	
August 8	Brave Dungeon: The Meaning of Justice	PS5	Port	RPG	Inside System		
August 10	Dungeon of Dragon Knight Remake	PS5	Remake	RPG	HexGameStudio		
August 10	Knytt Classic	WIN, OSX, LIN	Port	Platformer	Bit Kid, Nifflas		
August 11	Echoes of Mystralia	WIN	Early access	Roguelike, Action RPG	Borealys Games		
August 11	The Elder Scrolls IV: Oblivion Remastered	NS2	Port	Action RPG	Virtuos, Bethesda Game Studios	Bethesda Softworks	
August 11	Grounded 2	PS5	Early access	Action-adventure, survival	Eidos-Montréal, Obsidian Entertainment	Xbox Game Studios	
August 11	The Lord of the Rings: War in the North – Legacy Edition	WIN, NS, NS2, PS5, XBX/S	Remaster	Action RPG, Hack and slash	Aspyr		
August 11	No More Room in Hell 2	WIN, PS5, XBX/S	Full release	FPS, Survival horror	Torn Banner Studios		
August 11	Sacred 2: Fallen Angel Remaster	NS	Port	Action RPG	SparklingBit, Funatics Software	THQ Nordic	
August 12	Agefield High: Rock the School	WIN	Original	Adventure	Refugium Games		
August 12	Akatori	PS4, PS5, XBO, XBX/S	Port	Metroidvania	Contrast Games	Games Harbor, Esprit Games	
August 12	Everspace 2: Galactic Edition	NS2	Port	Action RPG	Rockfish Games		
August 12	Finding Polka	WIN	Original	Adventure	lidlocks	Parco Games	
August 12	Pro Jank Footy	WIN, NS2, PS5, XBX/S	Original	Sports	Powerbomb Games, Tinker Town	Powerbomb Games, Umbrella Gaming	
August 13	Arknights	WIN	Port	Tactical RPG	Hypergryph	Yostar	
August 13	BlazBlue Entropy Effect X – Nintendo Switch 2 Edition	NS2	Port	Action, Roguelike	91Act	Astrolabe Games	
August 13	CloverPit	NS, NS2, PS4, PS5	Port	Roguelike, Horror (psych)	Panik Arcade	Future Friends Games	
August 13	Dash'n'Drops	WIN	Early access	Platformer, Roguelite	Le Moulin aux Bulles		
August 13	Defender of the Crown: The Legend Returns	WIN, NS, PS5, XBX/S	Remake	Strategy	Black Tower Basement	Nordcurrent Labs	
August 13	Duskfade	WIN, NS2, PS5, XBX/S	Original	Action, Platformer	Weird Beluga Studio	Fireshine Games	
August 13	Hell Let Loose: Vietnam	WIN, PS5, XBX/S	Original	FPS	Expression Games	Team17	
August 13	IGS Classic Arcade Collection (Note: Includes Knights of Valour Superheroes, Knights of Valour Plus, Knights of Valour 2 - Nine Dragons, Oriental Legend, Oriental Legend Spooky, Martial Masters, Demon Front and The Gladiator.)	WIN	Compilation	—N/a	International Games System	H2 Interactive	
August 13	Menherarium	NS	Port	Deck building, Roguelite	Tezcatlipoca	Phoenixx	
August 13	Panzer Knights: Commander's Edition	PS5, XBX/S	Port	Action	Joy Brick	PQube	
August 13	Servant of the Lake	WIN, OSX, iOS, DROID	Original	PCA	Rusty Lake		
August 13	Skatesterre	WIN, NS2, PS5, XBX/S	Original	Sports	Goon Squad	Headup Games	
August 13	Super Mario Sunshine	NS2	Port	Platformer, Action-adventure	Nintendo EAD	Nintendo	
August 13	Wild Blue Skies	WIN, PS5, XBX/S	Original	Shoot 'em up (rail), Adventure	Chuhai Labs	Balor Games	
August 14	Mafia: Definitive Edition	PS5, XBX/S	Port	Action-adventure	Hangar 13	2K	
August 14	Mafia: The Old Country — Man of Honor	WIN, PS5, XBX/S	Expansion	Action-adventure	Hangar 13	2K	
August 14	Platonica Space	WIN, OSX	Original	Adventure	Kazuhide Oka	Kamitsubaki Studio	
August 15	Sister Other Paranoia	WIN, OSX	Original	Visual novel	HazeDenki	Serenity Forge	
August 17	Gobliiins Collection	NS2	Port	PCA	Red Art Games	Red Art Studios	
August 18	BeastLink	WIN	Early access	Action	Grove Street Games		
August 18	Entropy	WIN	Early access	RPG	Lovely Hellplace	DreadXP	
August 18	The Sinking City 2	WIN, PS5, XBX/S	Original	Survival horror	Frogwares		
August 18	Starsand Island	WIN, NS2, PS5, XBX/S	Full release	Life sim	Seed Sparkle Lab		
August 18	Twisted Tower	WIN	Original	FPS, Horror	Atmos Games	3D Realms	
August 19	No Case Should Remain Unsolved	PS5	Port	Adventure, Puzzle	Somi	Playism	
August 20	1000xResist – Nintendo Switch 2 Edition	NS2	Port	Adventure	Sunset Visitor	Fellow Traveller	
August 20	Another Crab's Treasure – Nintendo Switch 2 Edition	NS2	Port	Action-adventure	Aggro Crab		
August 20	Bubble Bobble Sugar Dungeons Boosted (JP)	NS, PS5	Port	Action, Platformer	Taito		
August 20	Cozy Marbles	WIN	Original	Racing, Simulation	Pixel Pea Games	Mythwright	
August 20	DayZ Cool Edition	NS2	Port	Survival	Bohemia Interactive		
August 20	Dogpile	iOS, DROID, NS, NS2	Port	Deck building, Roguelite	Studio Folly, Toot Games	WINGS	
August 20	Dungeon Antiqua 2	NS, PS5, XBX/S	Port	Dungeon crawl, RPG	Shiromofu Factory	AMATA Games	
August 20	Fantasy Life i: The Girl Who Steals Time	iOS, DROID	Port	Life sim, RPG	Level-5 Osaka Office	Level-5	
August 20	Gallipoli	WIN, PS5, XBX/S	Original	FPS	BlackMill Games		
August 20	Mexican Ninja	WIN, PS4, PS5, XBO, XBX/S	Original	Brawler, Roguelike	Madbricks	Amber Studio	
August 20	Mortal Shell II	WIN, PS5, XBX/S	Original	Action RPG	Cold Symmetry	Playstack	
August 20	Over Requiemz (WW)	NS	Rerelease	Otome, Visual novel	Kogado Studio, Otomate	Aksys Games	
August 20	Pipistrello and the Cursed Yoyo	NS2	Port	Platformer, Adventure	Pocket Trap	PM Studios	
August 20	S.T.A.L.K.E.R. 2: Cost of Hope	WIN, PS5, XBX/S	Expansion	FPS, Survival horror	GSC Game World		
August 20	Steins;Gate Re:Boot	JP: NS, NS2, PS4, PS5; WW: WIN	Remake	Visual novel	Mages	JP: Mages; WW: Spike Chunsoft	
August 20	Wobbly Life	NS2, iOS, DROID	Port	Simulation	RubberBandGames	Curve Games	
August 21	iRacing Arcade	PS5, XBX/S	Port	Racing	Original Fire Games	iRacing	
August 24	Blasterbug: Last Bug Standing!	WIN	Original	Party, Action	Dotemu		
August 25	1666: Amsterdam	WIN	Early access	Action-adventure	Panache Digital Games		
August 25	Aliens: Fireteam Elite 2	WIN, PS5, XBX/S	Original	TPS	Cold Iron Studios	Daybreak Game Company	
August 25	Apidya' Special	WIN, NS, PS5, XBX/S	Remake	Scrolling shooter (horizontal)	ININ Games		
August 25	Blood Dungeon	WIN, OSX, NS, NS2, PS5, XBX/S	Original	Platformer, Survival	Messhof		
August 25	Once Human	PS5, XBX/S	Port	Survival, Looter shooter	Starry Studio		
August 26	Brigandine: Abyss	WIN	Original	Tactical RPG	Happinet	JP: Happinet; WW: NIS America	
August 26	The Legend of Dark Witch	PS5	Port	Action	Inside System		
August 26	Lizards Must Die 2	PS5, XBX/S	Port	Hack and slash	the Bratans, Smola Game Studio	Smola Game Studio	
August 27	Aggelos II	WIN, NS, PS4, PS5, XBO, XBX/S	Original	Platformer	Wonderboy Bobi	PQube, PixelHeart	
August 27	Brigandine: Abyss	NS2, PS5, XBX/S	Port	Tactical RPG	Happinet	JP: Happinet; WW: NIS America	
August 27	Captain Tsubasa II: World Fighters (JP)	WIN, NS, PS5, XBX/S	Original	Sports	Tamsoft	Bandai Namco Entertainment	
August 27	Cocoro	WIN	Original	Visual novel	Frontwing	Good Smile Company	
August 27	Hakuoki Ibun: Berezinskii no Majo (JP)	NS	Original	Otome, Visual novel	Otomate	Idea Factory	
August 27	The Immortal John Triptych (Note: Includes Four Last Things, The Procession to Calvary and Death of the Reprobate.)	WIN, NS, NS2, PS5, XBO, XBX/S	Compilation	PCA	Joe Richardson	Akupara Games	
August 27	Kalanoro	WIN, NS, PS5, XBX/S	Original	Action-adventure	Red Raketa	New Tales	
August 27	Lou's Lagoon	WIN, NS, NS2, PS5, XBX/S	Original	Adventure	Tiny Roar	Megabit, rokaplay	
August 27	Metal Gear Solid: Master Collection Vol. 2	WIN, NS, NS2, PS5, XBX/S	Compilation	Action-adventure, Stealth	Konami Digital Entertainment		
August 27	Mind Diver	NS2, PS5	Port	Adventure	Indoor Sunglasses	Playism	
August 27	Model Debut4	WIN, NS2	Port	Simulation	Racjin	FuRyu	
August 27	Neptunia Unlimited (JP)	NS, NS2, PS4, PS5	Original	RPG	Compile Heart, Idea Factory		
August 27	Platonica Space	NS	Port	Adventure	Kazuhide Oka	Kamitsubaki Studio	
August 27	Resonance: A Plague Tale Legacy	WIN, PS5, XBX/S	Original	Action-adventure	Asobo Studio	Focus Entertainment	
August 27	Star Wars Zero Company	WIN, PS5, XBX/S	Original	TBT	Bit Reactor, Respawn Entertainment	Electronic Arts	
August 27	Whisper of the House	PS5, XBX/S	Port	Puzzle, Simulation	Yuanqi Bomb Studio	E-Home Entertainment Development	
August 28	Captain Tsubasa II: World Fighters (WW)	WIN, NS, PS5, XBX/S	Original	Sports	Tamsoft	Bandai Namco Entertainment	
August 28	Elden Ring Tarnished Edition	NS2	Port	Action RPG	FromSoftware	Bandai Namco Entertainment	
August 28	Vampire Survivors: Legacy of the Bloodmoon	WIN, OSX, iOS, DROID, NS, PS4, PS5, XBO, XBX/S	Expansion	Bullet heaven	poncle		
August 31	Serious Sam: Shatterverse	WIN, PS5, XBX/S	Original	Roguelike, FPS	Behaviour Interactive	Devolver Digital	
September 1	Aerial_Knight's MrFreezy	WIN	Original	Puzzle	Aerial_Knight		
September 1	Crimson Moon	WIN, PS5, XBX/S	Original	Action-adventure, RPG	ProbablyMonsters		
September 1	Grail	WIN	Original	Auto battler	Sokpop Collective		
September 1	Knuckle Jet	WIN, OSX, LIN	Original	Action, Platformer	Rain Games		
September 1	Let It Die: Offline Edition	WIN, PS5	Rerelease	Roguelike, Hack and slash	Supertrick Games	GungHo Online Entertainment	
September 2	Angeline Era	NS, PS4, PS5, XBO, XBX/S	Port	Action-adventure	Analgesic Productions		
September 2	Emery Hearts	WIN, OSX	Original	Action RPG	Haishō Interactive	Shinyuden	
September 2	Moonlighter 2: The Endless Vault	WIN, NS2, PS5, XBX/S	Full release	Roguelike, Action RPG	Digital Sun	11 Bit Studios	
September 3	Avatar Legends: The Fighting Game	XBX/S	Port	Fighting	Gameplay Group	PM Studios	
September 3	BioEden	WIN, NS2, PS5, XBX/S	Original	CMS	Broken Arms Games	Focus Entertainment	
September 3	The Blood of Dawnwalker	WIN, PS5, XBX/S	Original	Action RPG	Rebel Wolves	Bandai Namco Entertainment	
September 3	Donutal	WIN	Original	Adventure	Arc System Works		
September 3	Exstetra	NS, NS2, PS5	Port	RPG	FuRyu, Studio Saizensen	FuRyu	
September 3	Hashire Hebereke: EX	WIN, NS	Remake	Racing	Sunsoft	Gravity Game Arise	
September 3	Keeper	PS5	Port	Adventure	Double Fine		
September 3	My Hero Academia: All's Justice (JP)	NS2	Port	Fighting, Action	Byking	Bandai Namco Entertainment	
September 3	Orbitals	NS2	Original	Adventure	Shapefarm	Kepler Interactive	
September 3	SpeedRunners 2: King of Speed	WIN, NS, PS5, XBX/S	Original	Platformer, Racing	Fair Play Labs	tinyBuild	
September 3	Wo Long: Fallen Dynasty Complete Edition	NS2	Port	Action RPG, Hack and slash	Team Ninja	Koei Tecmo	
September 4	Isle of Reveries	WIN, LIN, NS, PS4, PS5, XBO, XBX/S	Original	Action-adventure	desertcucco	Electric Airship	
September 4	Jaleco Sports: Faceoffs (Note: Includes Pro Sport Hockey, Hoops and Racket Attack)	NS, PS5	Compilation	Sports	Sickhead Games	Rock It Games	
September 4	My Hero Academia: All's Justice (WW)	NS2	Port	Fighting, Action	Byking	Bandai Namco Entertainment	
September 4	NBA 2K27	WIN, NS2, PS5, XBX/S	Original	Sports	Visual Concepts	2K	
September 4	Onimusha: Way of the Sword	WIN, NS2, PS5, XBX/S	Original	Action-adventure	Capcom		
September 4	Phantom of Inferno Nitro Archive	WIN	Port	Visual novel	Nitroplus		
September 4	Teenage Mutant Ninja Turtles Arcade: Wrath of the Mutants – Ninja Edition	NS2	Port	Brawler	Cradle Games, Raw Thrills	GameMill Entertainment	
September 7	Mythmon: Mythic Monsters	WIN	Original	Hack and slash, Strategy	MachHabaneroGames	Kodansha	
September 7	Port of Jumanah	WIN, PS5	Original	Adventure	Agate, Red Dunes Games	Red Dunes Games	
September 7	WheelMates	WIN	Original	Adventure, Racing, Platformer	Firevolt		
September 8	Aerial_Knight's MrFreezy	PS5	Port	Puzzle	Aerial_Knight		
September 8	Culdcept The First Saturn Tribute (WW)	NS, PS5, XBX/S	Port	TBS, DCCG	City Connection	City Connection, Clear River Games	
September 8	Halloween: The Game	WIN, PS5, XBX/S	Original	Horror	IllFonic	IllFonic Publishing, Gun Interactive	
September 8	Honeycomb: The World Beyond	WIN, OSX, PS5, XBX/S	Original	Sandbox, Survival	Frozen Way	Frozen District, Snail	
September 8	Mewgenics	NS2, PS5, XBX/S	Port	Tactical RPG, Roguelike, Life sim	Edmund McMillen, Tyler Glaiel	Nicalis	
September 8	Sprawl Zero	WIN, NS2, PS5, XBX/S	Original	FPS	Maeth	Kwalee	
September 9	Banchou Tactics: Lion Heart	NS2	Original	Action, Tactical RPG	Corecell Technology, ITSARAAMATA	Corecell Technology	
September 9	Code Vein II – Mask of Idris	WIN, PS5, XBX/S	Expansion	Action RPG	Bandai Namco Studios	Bandai Namco Entertainment	
September 9	Crisis Core: Final Fantasy VII Reunion	NS2	Port	Action RPG	Square Enix		
September 9	Dragon Quest Heroes: Torneko's Mystery Dungeon – Classic HD	WIN, NS, NS2, PS5, XBX/S, iOS, DROID	Remake	Roguelike, Role-playing	Square Enix		
September 9	Earth Must Die	NS, PS5	Port	PCA	Size Five	No More Robots	
September 9	In Falsus	WIN	Original	Rhythm, Visual novel	lowiro		
September 9	Meccha Chameleon	NS2	Port	Casual	Lemorion 1224		
September 9	Star Fox Adventures	NS2	Port	Action-adventure	Rare	Nintendo	
September 9	Sunset Summit	WIN	Original	Adventure	Joe Fender, Andrew Fender	Future Friends Games	
September 9	Valheim	WIN, OSX, LIN, NS2, PS5, XBO, XBX/S	Full release	Sandbox, Survival	Iron Gate Studio	Coffee Stain Publishing	
September 10	The Alighieri Circle: Dante's Bloodline	WIN, PS5, XBX/S	Original	Horror (psych)	One-O-One Games	C&R Creative Studios, Entalto Publishing	
September 10	BrokenLore: Don't Lie	WIN, PS5, XBX/S	Original	Horror	Serafini Productions	Wired Productions	
September 10	The Crust	WIN, OSX	Full release	Strategy, City builder, Simulation	VEOM Studio	Crytivo	
September 10	Dumb Ways to Build	WIN, PS5, XBX/S	Original	Action	PlaySide Studios		
September 10	Ex Sanguis	WIN	Early access	TBS	Lightbulb Crew	Firesquid	
September 10	Gakkou de atta Kowai Hanashi (JP)	NS	Port	Visual novel	Mebius, Pandora Box	D3 Publisher	
September 10	Hazard Pay	WIN, OSX, LIN, NS, PS5	Original	Puzzle	Smitner Studio	Numskull Games	
September 10	Hot Wheels Infinite Rush	WIN, NS2, PS5, XBX/S	Original	Racing	Milestone		
September 10	Jupiter & Mars: Definitive Edition	NS	Port	Adventure	Tigertron		
September 10	The Legend of Heroes: Trails from Zero	NS2, PS5	Port	RPG	Nihon Falcom	NIS America	
September 10	The Legend of Heroes: Trails to Azure	NS2, PS5	Port	RPG	Nihon Falcom	NIS America	
September 10	Magical Blush	WIN	Original	Action-adventure	Alkacer Game Studio	Dangen Entertainment	
September 10	Romance of the Three Kingdoms XIV Complete Edition (JP/AS)	WIN, NS, PS4, PS5	Rerelease; PS5: Port	Strategy	Kou Shibusawa	Koei Tecmo	
September 10	Screenbound	WIN, PS5, XBX/S	Original	Platformer	Digital Pajamas, Crescent Moon Games	Crescent Moon Games	
September 10	Shroom and Gloom	WIN, OSX	Early access	Deck building, Roguelike	Team Lazerbeam	Devolver Digital	
September 10	Touhou Koumakyou: New Classic ~ The Embodiment of Scarlet Devil	WIN, NS, NS2, PS5	Remake	Bullet hell	Shanghai Alice Reprise	Alliance Arts	
September 10	Tsukikomori (JP)	NS	Port	Visual novel	Mebius, Pandora Box	D3 Publisher	
September 10	Wardogs	WIN	Early access	FPS	Bulkhead	Team17	
September 11	NHL 27	PS5, XBX/S	Original	Sports	EA Vancouver	Electronic Arts	
September 12	Warcraft III Reforged: Forsaken Kingdom	WIN, OSX	Expansion	RTS	Blizzard Entertainment, Lemon Sky Studios	Blizzard Entertainment	
September 13	The Legend of Dark Witch Episode 2: The Price of Desire	PS5	Port	Action	Inside System		
September 14	Beyblade X: Evobattle	PS5	Port	Action	Groove Box Japan	FuRyu	
September 14	Ferocious	PS5, XBX/S	Port	FPS	Omyog	tinyBuild	
September 14	Truck-kun is Supporting Me from Another World?!	NS2	Port	Vehicular combat	Strange Scaffold	Frosty Pop	
September 15	Active Matter	WIN, PS5, XBX/S	Full release	Extraction shooter, FPS	Team Matter	Gaijin Entertainment	
September 15	Destroy All Humans! 2: Reprobed	NS2	Port	Action-adventure	Black Forest Games	THQ Nordic	
September 15	Diablo IV: Age of Hatred Collection	NS2	Port	Action RPG, Hack and slash	Blizzard Entertainment		
September 15	Fallout 76	PS5, XBX/S	Port	Action RPG	Bethesda Game Studios	Bethesda Softworks	
September 15	Fright Train	WIN	Original	Survival horror	WildArts Games	Black Lantern Collective	
September 15	Marvel's Wolverine	PS5	Original	Action-adventure	Insomniac Games	Sony Interactive Entertainment	
September 15	RuneScape: Dragonwilds	WIN, NS2, PS5, XBX/S	Full release	Survival	Jagex		
September 15	TCG Card Shop Simulator	WIN, NS, NS2, PS5, XBO, XBX/S	Full release	Simulation	OPNeon Games		
September 15	Train Sim World 7	WIN, PS5, XBX/S	Original	Simulation	Dovetail Games		
September 15	Trinity Trigger DX	NS2	Port	Action RPG	Three Rings	JP: FuRyu; WW: Xseed Games	
September 16	Aniimo	WIN, PS5, XBX/S	Original	Action RPG, Monster tamer	Pawprint Studio	Kingsglory	
September 16	Blackwood	WIN	Original	TPS	AttritoM7 Productions		
September 16	Chit Chat Party!	NS2	Original	Party	Alim	GungHo Online Entertainment	
September 16	Disney Epic Mickey: Rebrushed	DROID, iOS	Port	Platformer	Purple Lamp, Snapshot Games	THQ Nordic Mobile	
September 16	Fallen Tear: The Ascension	WIN	Full release	Metroidvania	Winter Crew	CMD Studios	
September 16	Gladio Mori	WIN, PS5, XBX/S	Full release	Fighting	Plebian Studio	Bonus Stage Publishing	
September 16	Little Witch in the Woods	NS	Port	Life sim	Sunny Side Up		
September 16	Monowave	WIN, OSX, NS	Original	Puzzle-platformer	Studio BBB	Phoenixx	
September 16	Roman Sands RE:Build	WIN, NS, PS4, PS5, XBO, XBX/S	Original	Narrative adventure, Visual novel	Arbitrary Metric	Serenity Forge	
September 16	Two Point Hospital: Full Health Collection	NS2, PS5, XBX/S	Port	Business sim	Two Point Studios	Sega	
September 16	Woodo	WIN, NS, NS2, PS5, XBX/S	Original	Puzzle	Tiny Monks Tales	Daedalic Entertainment	
September 17	Absolum	NS2	Port	Brawler	Guard Crush Games, Supamonks	Dotemu	
September 17	Akiba Lost	WIN, NS, NS2, PS5	Original	Interactive film, Adventure	IzanagiGames		
September 17	Another Eden Begins	WIN, NS, NS2	Remaster	RPG	WFS, Studio Prisma	WFS	
September 17	Artis Impact	NS	Port	RPG	Mas	Happinet	
September 17	Concrete Burial	WIN	Original	Horror	Games From The Abyss	DreadXP	
September 17	Dave the Diver	iOS, DROID	Port	Fishing, Adventure	Mintrocket		
September 17	Endless Legend 2	WIN, PS5, XBX/S	Full release	TBS, 4X	Amplitude Studios	Hooded Horse	
September 17	Fading Echo	NS2, PS5, XBX/S	Port	Action-adventure	Emeteria	New Tales	
September 17	Fire Emblem: Fortune's Weave	NS2	Original	Tactical RPG	Intelligent Systems	Nintendo	
September 17	Flamecraft	WIN, OSX, NS, PS5, XBX/S	Original	Digital tabletop	Monster Couch	Cardboard Alchemy, Monster Couch	
September 17	Fountains	NS, PS5, XBX/S	Port	Soulslike	John Pywell	Crunching Koalas	
September 17	Granblue Fantasy Versus: Rising	NS2	Port	Fighting	Arc System Works	Cygames	
September 17	The Guild 1 Remake: Europa 1410	WIN	Early access, Remake	Life sim, Strategy	Ashborne Games	THQ Nordic	
September 17	Kernel Hearts	WIN, NS2, PS5, XBX/S	Original	Action RPG, Roguelike	Ephemera Games	Whitethorn Games	
September 17	Path of Mystery 2: The Mermaid Legend Murder Case (JP)	NS, NS2	Original	Visual novel	Toybox	Imagineer	
September 17	Patlabor: The Case Files	WIN, PS5	Original	Action	Chime Corporation	Good Smile Company	
September 17	Sniper Dan	WIN, NS, PS5, XBX/S	Original	Hidden object	Denki	PQube	
September 17	Trails in the Sky 2nd Chapter	WIN, NS, NS2, PS5	Remake	RPG	Nihon Falcom	JP: Nihon Falcom; NA: GungHo Online Entertainment	
September 17	Tristia: Chronicles (WW)	NS	Remaster, Compilation	Simulation	Kogado Studio	Aksys Games	
September 17	Trivia Murder Party 3	WIN	Early access	Party	Jackbox Games		
September 18	The Grinch 2: Saving Christmas	WIN, NS, PS4, PS5, XBX/S	Original	Adventure	Casual Brothers	Outright Games	
September 18	Lego Batman: Legacy of the Dark Knight	NS2	Port	Action-adventure	Traveller's Tales	Warner Bros. Games	
September 18	Moomintroll: Winter's Warmth	NS2, PS5	Port	Adventure	Hyper Games	Hyper Games, Kakehashi Games	
September 18	Paperhead	WIN, PS5, XBX/S	Original	FPS	Paperhead te4m	HypeTrain Digital	
September 18	The Walking Dead: Streets of Survival	WIN, NS, NS2, PS5, XBX/S	Original	Brawler	Odaclick Game Studio	Trailmark Games	
September 21	Dressmaker	WIN, OSX	Original	Simulation	Cozy Lives	Free Lives	
September 21	Samson: A Tyndalston Story	PS5, XBX/S	Port	Action	Liquid Swords		
September 22	Cupid Parasite	WIN	Port	Otome, Visual novel	Otomate	Idea Factory International	
September 22	Demeo x Dungeons & Dragons: Battlemarked	XBX/S	Port	Strategy, Adventure, RPG	Resolution Games		
September 22	Dune: Awakening	PS5, XBX/S	Port	Survival, MMO, RPG	Funcom		
September 22	EbiTapes	WIN, OSX	Original	Adventure, Cozy	Geese & Goose		
September 22	Graveyard Keeper II	WIN, NS, NS2, PS5, XBX/S	Original	Life sim, CMS	Lazy Bear Games	tinyBuild	
September 22	Rivage	WIN, PS5, XBX/S	Original	Adventure, Puzzle	Exnilo Studio	Raw Fury	
September 22	Ved: Recure	WIN	Original	Action, Roguelite	SummerClip		
September 22	Well Dweller	WIN, NS, NS2, PS5, XBX/S	Original	Metroidvania	Kyle Thompson	Top Hat Studios	
September 23	Aniimo	iOS, DROID	Port	Action RPG, Monster tamer	Pawprint Studio	Kingsglory	
September 23	Lawn Mowing Simulator 2	WIN, PS5, XBX/S	Original	Simulation	Skyhook Games		
September 23	Nomori	WIN, XBX/S	Original	Adventure, Puzzle	Enchanted Works		
September 23	Stick It to the Stickman	WIN, OSX	Full release	Roguelike, Brawler	Free Lives	Devolver Digital	
September 23	Wind Runners	WIN, OSX	Early access	Roguelike, Scrolling shooter, Shoot 'em up	Ludic Studios	Twin Sails Interactive	
September 24	Alien Breed 35th Anniversary Collection (Note: Includes the first six games from the Alien Breed series: from Alien Breed to Alien Breed 3D II: The Killing Grounds)	WIN, NS, PS5, XBX/S	Compilation	Run and gun	Antstream	Commodore	
September 24	Castlevania	iOS, DROID	Port	Platformer	Konami		
September 24	Control Resonant	WIN, PS5, XBX/S	Original	Action RPG	Remedy Entertainment		
September 24	Derby Stallion 2 (JP)	NS2	Original	Business sim, Racing (horse)	Game Addict, ParityBit	Game Addict	
September 24	Dragon Quest XI S: Echoes of an Elusive Age – Definitive Edition	NS2	Port	RPG	Square Enix, Orca	Square Enix	
September 24	Dragon Shelter	WIN	Original	Farming	Wild Forest Studio	Curve Games	
September 24	Drapline	WIN	Full release	Raising sim, Roguelite	Kanawo, Vaka Game Magazine	Vaka Game Magazine	
September 24	Farming Camp	WIN, LIN, NS, PS5, XBX/S	Original	Farming	Innerfire Studios	Soedesco	
September 24	Gobble (JP)	WIN, NS, NS2, PS5	Original	Action	Nippon Ichi Software		
September 24	The Magus Circle	WIN	Original	Roguelike	By Witchlight		
September 24	Namco Legendary Mountains	iOS, DROID	Port	Puzzle	BeXide		
September 24	Qliphah in Providence's Shadow	WIN, NS, PS5	Original	RPG	UnitePlus	Arc System Works	
September 24	Sayagatari: Promise of the Cursed Blade (JP)	WIN	Original	Visual novel	Visual Arts Scripts	Visual Arts	
September 24	Shinobi: Art of Vengeance	NS2	Port	Platformer, Action-adventure	Lizardcube	Sega	
September 24	Silent Hill: Townfall	WIN, PS5	Original	Survival horror	Screen Burn	Konami Digital Entertainment, Annapurna Interactive	
September 24	SiN: Reloaded	WIN, NS, NS2, PS4, PS5, XBO, XBX/S	Remaster	FPS	Nightdive Studios, Slipgate Ironworks, Ritual Entertainment	Nightdive Studios, Atari, 3D Realms	
September 25	EA Sports FC 27	WIN, NS, NS2, PS4, PS5, XBO, XBX/S	Original	Sports	EA Vancouver, EA Romania	Electronic Arts	
September 25	The Relic: First Guardian	XBX/S	Port	Action RPG	Project Cloud Games	Perp Games	
September 29	Aliens: Fireteam Elite 2	NS2	Port	TPS	Cold Iron Studios	Daybreak Game Company	
September 29	Gothic II Complete Classic	PS4, PS5, XBO, XBX/S	Port	Action RPG	Piranha Bytes	THQ Nordic	
September 29	Minecraft Dungeons II	WIN, NS, NS2, PS5, XBX/S	Original	Dungeon crawl	Mojang Studios, Double Eleven	Xbox Game Studios	
September 29	Neighbors: Suburban Warfare	WIN, PS5, XBX/S	Full release	FPS	Invisible Walls		
September 29	Nivalis Nights	WIN	Original	RPG, Simulation	Ion Lands	505 Games	
September 29	Petal Crash 2	WIN, LIN	Early access	Tile matching, Puzzle	Friend & Fairy	GalaxyTrail	
September 29	Toem 2	WIN, OSX, LIN, NS, NS2, PS5	Original	Photography, Adventure	Something We Made		
September 29	Transport Fever 3	WIN, OSX, LIN, PS5, XBX/S	Original	Business sim	Urban Games	Paradox Interactive	
September 29	Way of the Hunter 2	WIN, PS5, XBX/S	Full release	Adventure	Nine Rocks Games	THQ Nordic	
September 29	The Witcher 3: Wild Hunt – Remastered	WIN, NS2, PS5, XBX/S	Remaster	Action RPG	CD Projekt Red, Yigsoft	CD Projekt	
September 30	Middle-earth: Shadow Bundle (Note: Includes Middle-earth: Shadow of Mordor and Middle-earth: Shadow of War.)	NS2	Compilation	Action-adventure	Monolith Productions, Aspyr	Aspyr	
September 30	Okko The Exiled	WIN, OSX	Original	Action-adventure	Frozen Flame Interactive	Eastasiasoft	
September 30	Princess Maker: Children of Revelation	WIN, LIN	Full release	Raising sim	D-Zard, GEAR2	GEAR2	
September 30	Shinjuku Anomaly	WIN	Original	Horror, Visual novel	AMATA Games		
September 30	Songs of Glimmerwick	WIN	Original	RPG	Eastshade Studios		
September 30	Viractal (WW)	NS, NS2	Port	RPG	Sting		

- ← Jan
- Feb
- Mar
- Apr
- May
- Jun
- Jul
- Aug
- Sep
- Oct
- Nov
- Dec
- TBD →

=== October–December ===
Release date	Title	Platform(s)	Type(s)	Genre(s)	Developer(s)	Publisher(s)	Ref.
October 1	Augment Protocol (JP)	NS	Port	Visual novel	Key	Visual Arts	
October 1	Dynasty Warriors 3: Complete Edition Remastered	WIN, NS2, PS5, XBX/S	Remaster	Hack and slash	Omega Force	Koei Tecmo	
October 1	End of Abyss	WIN, PS5, XBX/S	Original	Action-adventure	Section 9 Interactive	Epic Games Publishing	
October 1	Heartworm	NS, NS2, PS4, PS5, XBO, XBX/S	Port	Survival horror	Vincent Adinolfi	DreadXP	
October 1	Moros Protocol	NS2, PS5	Port	Roguelike, FPS	Pixel Reign	Super Rare Originals	
October 1	Muchi Muchi Pork! & PinkSweets Boosted	WIN, NS, PS5	Compilation	Shoot 'em up	Cave	City Connection	
October 1	MXGP 26: The Official Game	WIN, PS5, XBX/S	Original	Racing	Artefacts Studio	Nacon	
October 1	Octopath Traveler (WW)	NS2	Port	RPG	Acquire, Square Enix	Square Enix	
October 1	Octopath Traveler II (WW)	NS2	Port	RPG	Acquire, Square Enix	Square Enix	
October 1	RetroSpace	WIN, NS2, PS5, XBX/S	Original	FPS, Horror	The Wild Gentlemen	Kwalee	
October 1	River City Survivors: Downtown of the Dead	iOS	Original	Bullet heaven	Arc System Works		
October 1	Viractal (JP)	NS, NS2	Port	RPG	Sting		
October 2	Ace Combat 8: Wings of Theve	WIN, PS5, XBX/S	Original	Vehicular combat (plane)	Bandai Namco Aces	Bandai Namco Entertainment	
October 2	Magical Craft: My Enchanted Dress Shop (WW)	NS	Original	Life sim	syn Sophia	Imagineer	
October 5	Aion 2 (WW)	WIN	Original	MMO, RPG	NCSoft		
October 6	Disney Epic Mickey: Rebrushed	NS2	Port	Platformer	Purple Lamp	THQ Nordic	
October 6	Gears of War: E-Day	WIN, XBX/S	Original	TPS	The Coalition, People Can Fly	Xbox Game Studios	
October 6	Star Wars: Galactic Racer	WIN, PS5, XBX/S	Original	Racing	Fuse Games	Secret Mode	
October 7	Deep Rock Galactic: Survivor	NS, NS2, PS5	Port	Bullet heaven	Funday Games	Ghost Ship Publishing	
October 8	Ayakashi Fishing Folktails (JP)	NS, NS2	Original	Action	Toybox	Imagineer	
October 8	Clive Barker's Hellraiser: Revival	WIN, NS2, PS5, XBX/S	Original	Survival horror, Action	Saber Interactive		
October 8	The Crew Motorfest	NS2	Port	Racing	Ubisoft Ivory Tower	Ubisoft	
October 8	Dancing with Ghosts	WIN	Early access	Life sim	HumaNature Studios		
October 8	Deck of Haunts	NS, NS2, PS5, XBO, XBX/S	Port	Deck building, Roguelike	Mantis Games	Dangen Entertainment	
October 8	Earth Defense Force 5	NS2	Port	TPS	Sandlot	D3 Publisher	
October 8	Echo Weaver	WIN, OSX, NS2, PS5, XBX/S	Original	Metroidvania	Moonlight Kids	Akupara Games	
October 8	Forever Ago	WIN, NS2, PS5, XBX/S	Original	Adventure	Third Shift	Annapurna Interactive	
October 8	Gear.Club Unlimited 3	WIN, PS5, XBX/S	Port	Racing	Eden Games	Nacon	
October 8	Hell Is Us	NS2	Port	Action-adventure	Rogue Factor	Nacon	
October 8	Isles of Sea and Sky	NS	Port	Puzzle	Cicada Games	Cicada Games, Gamera Games	
October 8	Kingdom Hearts Collection [I ~ III] (Note: Includes Kingdom Hearts HD 1.5 Remix, Kingdom Hearts HD 2.5 Remix, Kingdom Hearts HD 2.8 Final Chapter Prologue, and Kingdom Hearts III + Re Mind)	NS2, PS5, XBX/S	Compilation	Action RPG	Square Enix		
October 8	Mafia III: Definitive Edition	PS5, XBX/S	Port	Action-adventure	Hangar 13	2K	
October 8	Mamon King	NS2	Port	Raising sim	LiTMUS		
October 8	Neon Abyss 2	WIN, NS, PS5, XBX/S	Full release	Run and gun, Roguelike, Action-adventure	Veewo Games	Veewo Games, Kepler Ghost	
October 8	Once Upon a Katamari	NS2	Port	Puzzle, Action	RENGAME	Bandai Namco Entertainment	
October 8	Order of the Sinking Star	WIN, NS2, PS5	Original	Puzzle, Adventure	Thekla	Arc Games	
October 8	Silver Pines	WIN, NS, NS2, PS5, XBX/S	Original	Survival horror, Metroidvania	Wych Elm	Team17	
October 8	The World of Dokkaebi	iOS, DROID	Original	MMORPG	Supercat	Kakao Games	
October 9	Banchou Tactics: Lion Heart	PS5, XBX/S	Port	Action, Tactical RPG	Corecell Technology, ITSARAAMATA	Corecell Technology	
October 9	Dragon's Dogma 2: Dark Arisen	WIN, NS2, PS5, XBX/S	Port + Expansion	Action RPG	Capcom		
October 9	The Relic: First Guardian	NS2	Port	Action RPG	Project Cloud Games	Perp Games	
October 9	Sesame Street: Friends & Fun	WIN, NS, PS4, PS5, XBX/S	Original	Narrative adventure	Infinigon	Outright Games	
October 9	Truckful	WIN, OSX, LIN, DROID	Original	Adventure	MythicOwl	Pocketpair Publishing	
October 12	Alpha Nomos	WIN, PS5, XBX/S	Original	Action, Rhythm, Roguelite	RibCage Games		
October 12	Colorbound	WIN, NS, NS2, PS4, PS5, XBO, XBX/S	Original	Puzzle-platformer	Panpipe Studios	Whitethorn Games	
October 12	Sifu	iOS, DROID	Port	Brawler	Sloclap		
October 12	Spy Drops Gaiden	WIN, LIN	Original	Action, Stealth	Dadako	Rainy Frog	
October 12	Time To Wake Up	WIN, PS5	Original	Horror (psych)	Eye Blink Twice	Eye Blink Twice, Serafini Productions	
October 13	Deep Dish Dungeon	WIN, OSX, XBX/S	Original	Metroidvania, Survival	Behold Studios	Raw Fury	
October 13	Planet Zoo 2	WIN, PS5, XBX/S	Original	CMS	Frontier Developments		
October 13	SpongeBob SquarePants: Titans of the Tide	NS	Port	Platformer	Purple Lamp	THQ Nordic	
October 13	Total War: Shogun 2 – Complete Edition	WIN	Remaster	RTS	Creative Assembly	Sega	
October 13	Valor Mortis	WIN, PS5, XBX/S	Original	Soulslike	One More Level	Lyrical Games	
October 14	Hubert	WIN	Original	Adventure	Brocap Studio		
October 14	Kururin Paradise (WW)	NS, NS2	Port	Puzzle	Eighting	Nintendo	
October 14	Metal Slug Advance	NS, NS2	Port	Run and gun	Noise Factory	SNK Playmore	
October 14	Monster Rancher Advance	NS, NS2	Port	Life sim	Tecmo		
October 14	Over The Hill	WIN	Original	Adventure	Funselektor Labs, Strelka Games	Funselektor Labs	
October 14	Warhammer 40,000: Boltgun 2	WIN, PS5, XBX/S	Original	FPS	Auroch Digital	Big Fan Games	
October 14	The Witch's Bakery	WIN, NS, NS2, PS5, XBX/S	Original	Adventure, RPG	Sunny Lab	Silver Lining Interactive	
October 15	Antonblast	PS4, PS5	Port	Platformer	Summitsphere	Joystick Ventures	
October 15	A Bird Story	NS, PS5, XBX/S	Port	Adventure, RPG	Freebird Games	Serenity Forge	
October 15	Dupery: A Game of Solo Deduction	WIN, OSX	Original	Puzzle, Adventure, Roguelike	Gilded Rune Games	Yogscast Games, Gamersky Games	
October 15	Bluey's Happy Snaps	WIN, NS, NS2, PS4, PS5, XBO, XBX/S	Original	Adventure	Gameloft Brisbane	Gameloft	
October 15	Castlevania: Belmont's Curse	WIN, NS, PS5, XBX/S	Original	Metroidvania	Evil Empire, Motion Twin	Konami Digital Entertainment	
October 15	Enshrouded	WIN, PS5	Full release	Survival, Action RPG	Keen Games		
October 15	Frosthaven	WIN	Full release	Tactical RPG	Snapshot Games	Arc Games	
October 15	Harvest Moon: Echoes of Teradea	WIN, NS, NS2, PS5, XBX/S	Original	Farming	Imagica Geeq	Natsume Inc.	
October 15	It Takes Two	NS2	Port	Action-adventure	Hazelight Studios	Electronic Arts	
October 15	The Jackbox Party Pack 12	WIN, NS, PS4, PS5, XBO, XBX/S	Original	Party	Jackbox Games		
October 15	Pixel Washer	WIN	Early access	Simulation	Valadria	Acclaim, Inc.	
October 15	Ratatan	WIN, NS2, PS4, PS5, XBO, XBX/S	Full release	Rhythm, Action, Roguelike	TVT, Ratata Arts	Game Source Entertainment	
October 15	Tormented Souls II	NS2	Port	Survival horror	Dual Effect	PQube	
October 15	Toy Story 3: Complete Edition	WIN, NS, NS2, PS4, PS5, XBO, XBX/S	Remaster	Platformer	Digital Eclipse	Atari	
October 15	Toy Story: Retro Roundup!	WIN, NS, NS2, PS4, PS5, XBO, XBX/S	Compilation	—N/a	Digital Eclipse	Atari	
October 16	Heavy Metal Death Can	PS5, XBX/S	Port	Survival horror	Krufs Productions		
October 16	Lego Harry Potter Collection	NS2	Port	Action-adventure	Cast Iron Games, Double Eleven, TT Games	Warner Bros. Games	
October 16	Penguin Colony	WIN	Original	Narrative adventure	Origame Digital	Fellow Traveller	
October 16	Resident Evil 2 Deluxe Edition	NS2	Port	Survival horror	Capcom		
October 16	Resident Evil 3	NS2	Port	Survival horror	Capcom		
October 16	Resident Evil 4 Gold Edition	NS2	Port	Survival horror	Capcom		
October 16	Tales of Eternia Remastered	WIN, NS, NS2, PS4, PS5, XBX/S	Remaster	Action RPG	Tose	Bandai Namco Entertainment	
October 16	Tenebris Somnia	WIN, NS, NS2, PS5, XBX/S	Original	Survival horror, Adventure	Andrés Borghi, Saibot Studios	New Blood Interactive	
October 19	BeamNG.drive	PS5	Port	Vehicle sim	BeamNG		
October 19	DuneCrawl	DROID, PS5, XBX/S	Port	Action-adventure	Alientrap		
October 19	Frostpunk	NS	Port	City builder, Survival	11 Bit Studios		
October 20	Arctic Eggs	NS, PS5, XBX/S	Port	Simulation	The Water Museum	Critical Reflex	
October 20	Blue Ridge Hunting	WIN, LIN	Early access	Horror	Jade & Company	Six One Publishing	
October 20	Dementium II	WIN	Remaster	FPS, Survival horror	Atooi		
October 20	I Am Your Beast	NS, NS2	Port	FPS	Strange Scaffold		
October 20	Star Trek: Outposts Unknown	WIN, OSX	Original	City builder (outpost)	Magic Fuel Games	Playstack	
October 20	Mycopunk	WIN	Full release	FPS	Pigeons at Play	Devolver Digital	
October 20	We Were Here Tomorrow	WIN, PS5, XBX/S	Original	Adventure, Puzzle	Total Mayhem Games		
October 21	Escape From Playtime	WIN	Early access	Survival horror	Mob Entertainment		
October 21	The Killing Stone	WIN, PS5. XBX/S	Full release	Deck building	Question		
October 21	Stupid Never Dies	WIN, PS5	Original	Action RPG	GPTRACK50	GPTRACK50, Sega	
October 22	Azure Striker Gunvolt Trilogy Enhanced – Nintendo Switch 2 Edition	NS2	Port	Action, Platformer	Inti Creates		
October 22	Back to the Dawn	PS5	Port	RPG	Metal Head Games	Clouded Leopard Entertainment, Spiral Up Games	
October 22	Beyond the Dark: Nightwatch	NS2	Original	Horror	Atlantis Studio		
October 22	Cotton Reboot!	NS2, PS5	Port	Shoot 'em up	Rocket-Engine Co., Ltd	Clear River Games	
October 22	Cotton Reboot! High Tension! (WW)	NS, PS4, PS5	Original	Shoot 'em up	Beep	Clear River Games	
October 22	Cult of the Lamb	NS2	Port	Roguelike, CMS	Massive Monster	Devolver Digital	
October 22	Cult of the Lamb: Woolhaven	NS2, iOS	Port	Roguelike, CMS	Massive Monster	Devolver Digital	
October 22	Demons' Night Fever	WIN, NS, PS5	Original	Tactical RPG	Drecom, SuperNiche	Arc System Works	
October 22	Do Not Feed the Monkeys 2099	NS, PS4, PS5	Port	Simulation, Adventure	Fictiorama Studios	Joystick Ventures	
October 22	Final Fantasy Resonance	WIN, NS2, NS, PS5, XBX/S	Original	TBS, RPG	Square Enix		
October 22	Gaelco Sports Collection (Note: Includes World Rally Championship, World Rally 2: Twin Racing and Snow Board Championship.)	WIN, NS, PS4, PS5, XBO, XBX/S	Compilation	Sports	QUByte Interactive	QUByte Interactive, Bleem!, Piko Interactive	
October 22	Hitman: Absolution – Nintendo Switch 2 Edition	NS2	Port	Stealth, Action	IO Interactive	Feral Interactive	
October 22	HoloVillage: Our Cozy Days	NS2	Port	Life sim	Roboqlo	Holo Indie	
October 22	Moadra	WIN, NS, PS5, XBX/S	Original	Metroidvania	Gloomsoft		
October 22	My Friendly Neighborhood	NS2	Port	Survival horror	John Szymanski, Evan Szymanski	DreadXP	
October 22	Nintendo Switch Sports Resort	NS2	Original	Sports	Nintendo		
October 22	Peak	NS2, PS5, XBX/S	Port	Action-adventure	Aggro Crab, Landfall		
October 22	Pocket Mirror: GoldenerTraum	NS, PS4, PS5	Port	Horror, Adventure, RPG	AstralShift, VisuStella	Komodo	
October 22	Red Chat Ritual: Tsumimi Time	WIN	Original	Visual novel, Horror, Adventure	Tohakusha		
October 22	Shadow of the Tomb Raider: Definitive Edition	NS2	Port	Action-adventure	Eidos-Montréal	Aspyr	
October 23	Call of Duty: Modern Warfare 4	WIN, NS2, PS5, XBX/S	Original	FPS	Infinity Ward	Activision	
October 23	One Piece: Grand Gourmet	WIN, NS, NS2, iOS, DROID	Original	CMS	Kairosoft	Bandai Namco Entertainment	
October 23	Vixen 357	WIN, NS, PS4, PS5, XBO, XBX/S	Port	Tactical RPG	Shinyuden	Masaya Games, Shinyuden, Ratalaika Games	
October 23	Warrior Cats: Clans of the Forest	WIN, NS, NS2, PS5, XBX/S	Original	RPG	Bamtang Games	Trailmark Games	
October 24	Brave Dungeon + Dark Witch's Story: COMBAT	PS5	Port	RPG	Inside System		
October 24	Grifford Academy	WIN, iOS, DROID	Full release	RPG	LandShark Games		
October 26	Fangtopia	WIN, NS2, PS5	Original	Cozy, Puzzle	Absolutely Games	Secret Mode	
October 26	Hunter's Moon	PS5	Original	Horror, Adventure	Twin Swans		
October 26	Playable Archive	WIN	Original	Horror (psych)	DarkStone Digital	DreadXP	
October 26	Reka	WIN	Full release	Adventure, Sandbox	Emberstorm Entertainment	Fireshine Games	
October 26	Scramble Knights Online	WIN, LIN, XBX/S	Early access	Action RPG, MMO	Funktronic Labs		
October 27	4 Penny Coffins	WIN	Original	Adventure	Other Ocean		
October 27	9 R.I.P. sequel (WW)	NS	Original	Otome, Visual novel	Otomate	Idea Factory International	
October 27	Avenging Spirit	NS, NS2	Port	Platformer	C.P.Brain	Jaleco	
October 27	Dog Man: Bark in Action	WIN, NS, PS4, PS5, XBO, XBX/S	Original	Adventure, Platformer	Floor 84 Studio	Mindscape	
October 27	Emberville	WIN, LIN	Early access	Action, Adventure, RPG	Cygnus Cross		
October 27	Minecraft: Bedrock Edition	NS2	Port	Sandbox, Survival	Mojang Studios		
October 27	Mole Mania	NS, NS2	Port	Action, Puzzle	Nintendo EAD, Pax Softnica	Nintendo	
October 27	The Outlast Trials	NS2	Port	Survival horror	Red Barrels		
October 27	Remothered: Red Nun's Legacy	WIN, NS2, PS5, XBX/S	Original	Survival horror	Stormind Games	Stormind Games, Soft Source Publishing	
October 27	Revenge of the 'Gator	NS, NS2	Port	Pinball	HAL Laboratory		
October 27	The Séance of Blake Manor	NS2, PS5, XBX/S	Port	Adventure, Puzzle	Spooky Doorway	Raw Fury	
October 27	Village in the Shade (WW)	WIN, NS, NS2, PS5	Original	Life sim, Adventure	Nippon Ichi Software	NIS America	
October 27	Virtue and a Sledgehammer	WIN	Original	Action-adventure	Deconstructeam, Selkie Harbour	Devolver Digital	
October 28	Bleach Mirrors High	iOS, DROID	Original	Action	Bandai Namco Entertainment		
October 28	Buzz or Die	WIN	Original	Visual novel	Bon	Kodansha	
October 28	Cities: Skylines – Expanded Edition	NS2	Port	City builder, CMS	Tantalus Media	Paradox Interactive	
October 28	Culdcept Begins	WIN	Port	TBS, DCCG	Neos		
October 28	Gennady	WIN, NS, PS4, PS5, XBO, XBX/S	Original	Platformer, Roguelike	Feed 64	Feed 64, Vsoo Games, Sobaka Studio	
October 28	No Man's Sky	iOS	Port	Action-adventure, Survival	Hello Games		
October 28	Probably Stolen	WIN	Original	Life sim	Questing Goose Studio	tinyBuild	
October 28	Schrödinger's Call	NS2	Port	Adventure, Visual novel	Acrobatic Chirimenjako	Shueisha Games	
October 28	SNØ: Ultimate Freeriding	NS2, PS5, XBX/S	Port	Sports (ski)	Studio Gauntlet	AMATA Games	
October 28	Sulfur	WIN, NS, NS2, PS4, PS5, XBO, XBX/S	Full release	FPS, Roguelike	Perfect Random		
October 28	Urban Myth Dissolution Center – Nintendo Switch 2 Edition	NS2	Port	Adventure, Visual novel	Hakababunko	Shueisha Games	
October 28	Wild Blue Skies	NS	Port	Shoot 'em up (rail), Adventure	Chuhai Labs	Balor Games	
October 29	Age of Empires IV: Raiders of the North	WIN, PS5, XBO, XBX/S	Expansion	RTS	Relic Entertainment, World's Edge	Xbox Game Studios	
October 29	Anomalith	WIN, NS2, PS5	Original	TPS, Survival horror	Winning Entertainment Group	FuRyu	
October 29	Atmosfar	WIN	Early access	Survival	Apog Labs	Shueisha Games	
October 29	Black Lily's Tale (JP)	NS	Port	Dating sim, Visual novel	1000-REKA	1000-REKA, mirai works, Kadokawa Game Linkage	
October 29	Crimson Desert: Charting the Unknown	WIN, OSX, PS5, XBX/S	Expansion	Action-adventure	Pearl Abyss		
October 29	Croc 2: Kingdom of the Gobbos	WIN, NS, PS4, PS5, XBX/S	Remaster	Platformer	Argonaut Games		
October 29	Danchi Days	WIN, OSX	Original	Adventure	sandy powder, Melos Han-Tani, mogumu, gingham games	Analgesic Productions	
October 29	Demon Slayer: Kimetsu no Yaiba – The Hinokami Chronicles 2 – Nintendo Switch 2 Edition (JP)	NS2	Port	Fighting, Action-adventure	CyberConnect2	Aniplex	
October 29	Epic Seven	WIN	Port	RPG	Super Creative	Smilegate	
October 29	Hatsune Miku Connecting Puzzle Tamagotori Deluxe	WIN, PS4, PS5, XBO	Port	Puzzle	Crypton Future Media	Komodo	
October 29	Hello Kitty Party Land	NS, NS2	Original	Party	G-STYLE	Sanrio Games, Bandai Namco Entertainment	
October 29	Hokko Spaces	WIN, NS	Original	Sandbox	Wonderscope Games	Team17	
October 29	Joe & Mac Retro Collection (Note: Includes Joe & Mac, Congo's Caper and Joe & Mac 2: Lost in the Tropics)	WIN, NS, NS2, PS5, XBX/S	Compilation	Platformer	Red Art Games		
October 29	Kowloon's Gate: Suzaku	NS	Port	Adventure	Jetman Inc.		
October 29	Metro Redux	PS5, XBX/S	Port	FPS	4A Games	Deep Silver	
October 29	Monster Hunter Outlanders	iOS, DROID	Original	Action RPG, Survival	Capcom, TiMi Studio Group	Level Infinite	
October 29	Mouthwashing	NS, PS4, PS5, XBX/S	Port	Adventure, Horror	Wrong Organ	Critical Reflex	
October 29	Phantom Blade Zero	WIN, PS5	Original	Action RPG	S-GAME		
October 29	Planted!	WIN, NS, PS5, XBX/S	Original	Party	Cloth Cat Games	Curveball Games	
October 29	RV There Yet?	NS2, PS5	Port	Adventure	Nuggets Entertainment		
October 29	Steins;Gate Re:Boot (WW)	NS, NS2, PS4, PS5, XBX/S	Port	Visual novel	Mages	Spike Chunsoft	
October 29	Sword of the Sea	NS2, XBX/S	Port	Adventure	Giant Squid	Fictions	
October 29	Terrible Lizards	WIN, PS5, XBX/S	Original	Puzzle-platformer, Survival horror	WDR Studios	Behaviour Interactive, Digital Pajamas	
October 29	Titanium Court	NS, NS2, PS5, iOS, DROID	Port	Tile matching, Roguelike, Tower defense	AP Thomson	Fellow Traveller	
October 29	The Wolf Among Us Remastered	WIN, PS5, XBO, XBX/S	Remaster	Graphic adventure, Interactive film	Telltale Games	Telltale Games, PM Studios	
October 30	Asylum	NS, PS4, PS5, XBX/S	Port	Adventure, Horror	Senscape	Soedesco	
October 30	The Cat in the Hat: Rainy Day Mayhem	WIN, NS, PS4, PS5, XBX/S	Original	Party	Casual Brothers	Outright Games	
October 30	Look Outside	NS, NS2, PS4, PS5	Port	RPG, Survival horror	Francis Coulombe	Devolver Digital	
October 30	Queen's Domain	WIN, NS2, PS5, XBX/S	Original	Action RPG	Freshly Baked Games	Future Friends Games	
October 30	Suri: The Seventh Note	WIN, PS5	Original	Action, Rhythm, Platformer	Tathvamasi Studios		
October 31	HorrorVale: Deadluxe Edition	NS, PS4, PS5, XBO, XBX/S	Port	Horror, RPG	BatWorks Software	Electric Airship	
November 2	Gravhounds	WIN, XBX/S	Early access	Action, TPS	Octopus Panic		
November 3	ArcheAge Chronicles	WIN	Early access	MMORPG	XL Games		
November 3	Dungeon Rampage Remastered	WIN	Remaster/Full release (Note: It's a 1.0 release that got rebranded as a remaster.)	Action RPG, Dungeon crawl	Gamebreaking Studios		
November 3	Godzilla: Destroy All Monsters Melee Remastered	WIN, NS2, PS5, XBX/S	Remaster	Fighting	Pipeworks Software	Atari	
November 3	Wilderdark	WIN	Original	Stealth, Survival horror	Team Junkfish		
November 3	Zero Parades: Director's Cut	NS2, PS5, XBX/S	Port	RPG	ZA/UM		
November 4	Hull Rupture	WIN, OSX, LIN	Original	Roguelike, Tower defense	Konfa Games	Team17	
November 4	Lightyear Frontier	WIN, XBX/S	Full release	Adventure, Farming	Frame Break	Coffee Stain Publishing	
November 4	Sound System	WIN	Early access	Rhythm	Echo Foundry Interactive	Bonus Stage Publishing	
November 4	Theos: Cities of Myth	WIN	Original	City builder	Triskell Interactive	Dotemu	
November 4	Void/Breaker	WIN, PS5, XBX/S	Full release	FPS, Roguelite	Stubby Games	Playstack	
November 4	WendyQuest: Legend of the Four Corner Stones	WIN	Original	RPG	81monkeys		
November 4	World of Warcraft: Forever	WIN, OSX	Rerelease	MMO, RPG	Blizzard Entertainment		
November 5	Absolum	iOS, DROID	Port	Brawler	Guard Crush Games, Supamonks	Dotemu, Playdigious	
November 5	Airframe Ultra	WIN	Original	Racing, Vehicular combat	Videocult	Akupara Games	
November 5	Chivalware	WIN, NS2	Original	Action, Roguelite	Regal Pigeon	The Arcade Crew, Imperfect Games	
November 5	Crymelight	WIN, NS2, PS5	Original	Roguelike, Action	FuRyu		
November 5	Escape Academy 2: Back 2 School	WIN, PS5, XBX/S	Original	Puzzle, Adventure	Coin Crew Games	iam8bit	
November 5	Eternal Palace Sakura	WIN, NS	Original	Action, Roguelite	Denneko Yuugi	Denneko Yuugi, Shochiku	
November 5	Faraway	WIN, NS, NS2, PS5, XBX/S	Original	Puzzle	Steph Thirion	Annapurna Interactive	
November 5	Kingdom of Night	NS, PS5, XBX/S	Port	Action RPG	Black Seven Studios	Dangen Entertainment	
November 5	K-POP Rising: Dream to Shine	WIN, NS, PS5	Original	Rhythm, Simulation	Old Skull Games	Microids	
November 5	The Legend of Zelda: Ocarina of Time	NS2	Remake	Action-adventure	Nintendo EPD	Nintendo	
November 5	Light: Black Cat & Amnesia Girl	PS5	Port	Adventure, Puzzle	Daylight Studio	COSEN	
November 5	Lilac: side Witch	NS	Port	Visual novel	Frontwing	Bushiroad Games	
November 5	Lilac: side Wizard	NS	Port	Visual novel	Frontwing	Bushiroad Games	
November 5	Marvel's Guardians of the Galaxy Encore Edition	NS2	Port	Action-adventure	Eidos-Montréal	Square Enix	
November 5	Payday: Aces High	WIN, Quest	Original	FPS	Fast Travel Games		
November 5	Psycho-Sleuth	WIN	Original	Visual novel	Phosepo	Thermite Games, Smilegate	
November 5	Where The Seeds Fall	WIN, NS2, PS5	Original	Adventure, Platformer	CygamesEdge, Zereo	Cygames	
November 5	Wielders of the Essence	WIN, OSX	Original	Bullet heaven	Lavapotion	Lavapotion, Coffee Stain Publishing	
November 5	Yomawari: The Long Night Collection (WW)	PS5	Port	Survival horror	Nippon Ichi Software	NIS America	
November 5	Yomawari: Lost in the Dark (WW)	PS5	Port	Survival horror	Nippon Ichi Software	NIS America	
November 6	Dungeon Munchies 2	WIN, OSX	Early access	Action RPG	maJAJa		
November 6	Hasbro Games Junior Collection (Note: Includes digital versions of Monopoly Jr., Clue Jr., and The Game of Life Jr.)	WIN, NS, NS2, PS4, PS5, XBX/S	Original	Digital tabletop, Party	Casual Brothers	Outright Games	
November 6	Stellar Blade Complete Edition	NS2	Port	Action-adventure	Shift Up		
November 9	Dreadmoor	WIN	Early access	Adventure	Dream Dock	Digital Vortex	
November 9	Hozy	PS5, XBX/S	Port	Cozy	Come On Games	tinyBuild	
November 10	1999TOKOYO Building	WIN	Original	Horror	Tokoyo Fudosan	Kodansha	
November 10	Annihilated	WIN	Original	Deck building, RPG, Visual novel	Desu Kumiai	Desu Kumiai, Flashlight Games	
November 10	DreamWorks Shrek 2 Remastered	WIN, NS, NS2, PS5, XBX/S	Remaster	Action-adventure	Aspyr		
November 10	Football Manager 27	WIN, OSX, PS5, XBX/S, iOS, DROID	Original	Sports management	Sports Interactive	Sega, Netflix (mobile)	
November 10	Hard West 2	PS5, XBX/S	Port	Strategy	Ice Cold Games	Good Sheperd Entertainment, Klabater	
November 10	Hope in the City	WIN, XBX/S	Original	Adventure	Lofty Sky Games		
November 10	Nocturnal 2	WIN	Original	Metroidvania	Sunnyside Games		
November 10	Ova Magica	NS, NS2, PS4, PS5, XBO, XBX/S	Port	Life sim	Skinny Frog	Top Hat Studios	
November 10	Raccoin: Chaos Max Edition	NS2, PS5, XBX/S	Port	Deck building, Roguelike	Doraccoon	Playstack	
November 10	Takeover 2	WIN	Original	Brawler	Pelikan13		
November 10	Tanuki: Pon's Summer	WIN, NS, NS2, PS4, PS5, XBO, XBX/S	Original	Adventure	Denkiworks	Critical Reflex	
November 10	Thrifty Business	DROID, iOS	Port	Simulation	Spellgarden Games		
November 10	Unpetrified: Echoes of Nature	NS, PS5, XBX/S	Port	Adventure	Dreamhunt Studio	Mindscape	
November 10	Warhammer Survivors	WIN, NS, NS2, PS5, XBX/S	Original	Bullet heaven	Auroch Digital		
November 11	Springs, Eternal	WIN	Original	Narrative adventure	Fullbright	Serenity Forge	
November 12	Adorable Adventure	NS2	Port	Adventure, Cozy	Wild Sheep Studio	PQube	
November 12	Barbie Rewind	WIN, NS, NS2, PS4, PS5, XBO, XBX/S	Compilation	—N/a	Digital Eclipse	Atari	
November 12	Fakin' It XL	WIN, NS, PS5, XBX/S	Original	Party	Jackbox Games		
November 12	Harold Halibut	NS2	Port	Adventure	Slow Bros.		
November 12	Hazard Levels	WIN, PS5, XBX/S	Full release	FPS, Survival	Wales Interactive		
November 12	Herdling – Nintendo Switch 2 Edition	NS2	Port	Adventure	Okomotive	Panic	
November 12	Metaphor: ReFantazio	NS2	Port	RPG	Studio Zero	JP: Atlus; WW: Sega	
November 12	Moomin: Midsummer Madness	WIN, NS, NS2	Original	PCA	Crossbridge Game Studios	Shochiku	
November 12	Pikmin 4 – Nintendo Switch 2 Edition + Dandori Academy	NS2	Remaster + Expansion	Puzzle, RTS	Nintendo EPD, Eighting	Nintendo	
November 12	Prinny Party: Going Overboard! (JP)	WIN, NS, NS2, PS5	Original	Party	Nippon Ichi Software		
November 12	Sonic Pico Park	WIN, OSX, NS, NS2, PS5, XBO, XBX/S	Original	Puzzle	TECOPARK		
November 13	Derelikt	WIN, PS5, XBX/S	Original	FPS, Horror	Visuwyg	Hyperstrange	
November 13	Drawquarium	WIN	Original	Cozy	byKaleb	rokaplay	
November 13	UnderMire	WIN	Original	Roguelike, Adventure	Table Knight Games		
November 13	Warota: I Live Next to The Demon King's Castle LOL	WIN	Early access	City builder (village)	Team Earth Wars	One or Eight	
November 16	Littlelands	WIN	Early access	Action-adventure, Farming	HyperMegaPixel	Apogee Entertainment	
November 16	Spirit Crossing	WIN, NS, NS2	Original	MMO, Life sim	Spry Fox		
November 17	Duck Side of the Moon	PS5	Port	Adventure	Starbrew Games		
November 17	HARMA	WIN	Early access	Deck building, Rougelike	INDIRECT SHINE	Astrolabe Games	
November 17	Moonlight Peaks	PS5	Port	Life sim	Little Chicken Game Company	Xseed Games, Marvelous Europe	
November 17	POPUCOM	PS5	Port	Puzzle, Adventure	Hypergryph	Gryphline, Fireshine Games	
November 18	Burning Sword: Death Sun	WIN	Early access	Action, Hack and slash	Nomadic Games		
November 19	The Binding of Isaac: Repentance+	NS2	Port	Roguelike, Action-adventure	Edmund McMillen	Nicalis	
November 19	Evil Origin	WIN	Original	RPG	Kevin Musto		
November 19	Grand Theft Auto VI	PS5, XBX/S	Original	Action-adventure	Rockstar Games		
November 19	Reverie in the Moonlight	NS, NS2	Port	Action, Rougelike	Room6 Inc.		
November 19	Volvy's Adventure: Reslimed	WIN	Original	Platformer	Doinksoft	Devolver Digital	
November 19	Witch the Showdown	WIN	Early access	Deck building	CitalesGames	Perp Games	
November 22	Zombie Police: Midsummer Unhappy New Year	WIN, OSX	Original	Adventure	Lobstudio		
November 24	Everything is Crab	iOS, DROID	Port	Roguelite	Odd Dreams Digital	Secret Mode	
November 24	Gothic 3 Classic	PS4, PS5, XBO, XBX/S	Port	Action RPG	Piranha Bytes	THQ Nordic	
November 25	KuloNiku: Bowl Up!	NS, NS2	Port	Simulation	Gambir Studio	Raw Fury	
November 25	Mercenaries Grace: Black Feather and the Golden Right Arm (JP)	PS5	Original	Tactical RPG	RideonJapan		
November 26	Appulse	WIN	Original	Pinball, Roguelite	Le Rado	Raw Fury	
November 26	Azur Promilia (AS)	WIN, iOS, DROID	Original	Action RPG	Manjuu		
November 26	Expelled from Paradise: The Stellar Angel	WIN, NS	Original	Visual novel	Studio51	Toei Animation	
November 26	Hello Kitty and Friends: Freeze Tag Party (JP)	NS2	Port	Action	Imagineer		
November 26	Machine Party	NS, PS5, XBX/S	Port	Party	Mike Klubnika	Oro Interactive	
November 26	The Spectrum Retreat Redux	WIN, PS5, XSX/S	Port	Puzzle	Ripstone		
November 26	Station to Station	NS2, PS5	Port	Simulation	Galaxy Grove	Engine Software	
November 27	GRIME II	NS, NS2	Port	Action, Metroidvania	Clover Bite	Kwalee	
November 27	MR. ELEVATOR	PS5	Port	Adventure, Puzzle	GIFT TEN INDUSTRY		
November 30	GrimKeep	WIN, OSX, PS5	Original	Deck building, Roguelite	Resolution Games		
November 30	Hakoniwa Electric	WIN	Original	Puzzle	Anettai		
November	Silly Polly Beast	NS2	Port	Action, Shooter, Survival horror	Anji Games	Top Hat Studios	
December 1	Book Nook	WIN	Original	Adventure	Malapata Studio	WINGS	
December 1	CaTHaRSiS: The last of atelier	WIN	Original	Adventure	Mana	Kodansha Creator's Lab	
December 1	Hela: of Mice and Magic	WIN, NS2, PS5, XBX/S	Original	Adventure	Windup Games	Knights Peak	
December 1	PixelHeroScramble Plus	WIN, NS	Remake	Tower defense	One or Eight		
December 2	The Ascent Ultimate Edition	NS2	Port	Action RPG	Neon Giant	Krafton	
December 2	Blind Descent	WIN	Early access	Survival	Pokuch	META Publishing	
December 2	The Great Villainess: Strategy of Lily	NS2, PS5	Port	TBS	One or EIGHT, WSS Playground, Alliance Arts	Alliance Arts	
December 2	Luma Island	PS5, XBX/S	Port	Life sim	Feel Free Games		
December 3	Aeterna Lucis	WIN, NS, PS4, PS5, XBO, XBX/S	Original	Metroidvania	Aeternum Game Studios		
December 3	Apple Crumble	WIN, OSX, LIN	Original	Adventure	Happy Broccoli Games		
December 3	Cronos: Lazarus	WIN, OSX, LIN, NS2, PS5, XBX/S	Expansion	Survival horror	Bloober Team		
December 3	The Dark Queen of Mortholme	NS2, PS5, XBX/S	Port	Action-adventure	Mosu	Rhine Games, Monster Theater	
December 3	Dragon Quest Monsters: The Withered World	WIN, NS, NS2, PS5, XBX/S	Original	RPG	Tose	Square Enix	
December 3	Dumpster Gang	WIN	Original	Sandbox	Coyote House Games	Curve Games	
December 3	Edge of Memories	WIN, PS5, XBX/S	Original	Action RPG	Midgar Studio	Nacon	
December 3	Eriksholm: The Stolen Dream	NS2	Port	Adventure, Stealth	River End Games	Nordcurrent	
December 3	Fall Up	WIN, NS, NS2, PS4, PS5, XBX/S	Original	Platformer	Unicellular Games	Astrolabe Games	
December 3	FreeStyle football 2	WIN, PS5, XBX/S	Original	Sports	Woore	Joycity	
December 3	HUNGER	WIN	Early access	FPS, Action RPG	Good Fun Corporation		
December 3	Million Depth	NS	Port	Action, Roguelike	Cyber Space Biotope	Playism	
December 3	Rayman Legends Retold	WIN, NS2, PS5, XBX/S	Remake	Platformer	Ubisoft Montpellier, Ubisoft Milan	Ubisoft	
December 3	SOMBRAS: negative frames	WIN, NS, PS5, XBX/S	Original	Adventure, Horror	Maboroshi Artworks	Entalto Publishing	
December 3	Thief: The Dark Project Remastered	WIN, NS, NS2, PS4, PS5, XBX/S	Remaster	Stealth	Nightdive Studios, Eidos-Montréal	Atari	
December 3	THYSIASTERY	NS, PS4, PS5, XBO, XSX/S	Port	Dungeon crawl, RPG	DIRGA		
December 3	Waltz and Jam	WIN, NS2, PS5	Original	Action-adventure, Puzzle	Flyway Games	Flyway Games, Krafton	
December 3	Warhammer 40,000: Dawn of War IV	WIN	Original	RTS	King Art Games	Deep Silver	
December 3	Xenoblade Chronicles 3 – Nintendo Switch 2 Edition	NS2	Remaster	Action RPG	Monolith Soft	Nintendo	
December 3	Zero Hour	PS5, XBX/S	Port	FPS, Tactical shooter	AttritoM7 Productions		
December 4	Acts of Blood	WIN	Original	Brawler, Action	Eksil Team	Big Fan Games	
December 4	Monster Hunter Wilds	NS2	Port	Action RPG	Capcom		
December 4	Petit Planet	WIN, iOS, DROID	Original	Life sim	miHoYo		
December 7	Coral Island	NS2	Port	Simulation	Stairway Games	Balor Games	
December 7	Mouse Work	NS2	Original	Party	Nitrome		
December 7	Muri: WildWoods	WIN, LIN	Original	Adventure, Cozy	Speldosa Interactive		
December 8	Ancestors: The Humankind Odyssey	NS2, PS5, XBX/S	Remaster	Survival	Panache Digital Games	Fictions	
December 8	Don't Fret	WIN, PS5, XBX/S	Original	Horror (psych)	Scary Kid Studios	Digital Pajamas, Behaivour Interactive	
December 8	Drunken Goddess Reflux	WIN	Original	Simulation	Alliance Arts, WHO YOU	Alliance Arts	
December 8	Elements Destiny	WIN, OSX, LIN, PS4, PS5, XBO, XBX/S	Original	RPG	ShrooMoon UG	Deck13 Spotlight	
December 8	Guns of Eschaton	WIN, PS5, XBX/S	Original	FPS, Soulslike	Eschatology Entertainment	4Divinity	
December 8	Replaced	DROID	Port	Action, Platformer	Sad Cat Studios	Atari	
December 9	A-Train 9 Prime Line	WIN	Rerelease	Simulation	Artdink	Artdink, Komodo	
December 9	Dispatch	iOS, DROID	Port	Adventure	AdHoc Studio		
December 9	Riders Republic	NS2	Port	Racing, Sports	Ubisoft Annecy	Ubisoft	
December 9	Winter Whiskers	WIN, OSX	Original	Simulation	Mango Leaf Games		
December 9	Wish Upon a Llama	WIN, NS, PS4, PS5, XBO, XBX/S	Original	Cozy, Life sim	Millionhare Studios	Whitethorn Games	
December 9	Wonderfall	WIN	Original	Action adventure	Attaboy Interactive		
December 10	Aeruta	NS, PS4, PS5	Port	Action RPG, Life sim	FromDawn Games	Gravity Game Arise	
December 10	Angelian Trigger (JP)	WIN	Port	Shoot 'em up	PiXEL		
December 10	Attack on Titan 3	WIN, NS2, PS5, XBX/S	Original	Hack and slash	Omega Force	Koei Tecmo	
December 10	Ninja Baseball League-Man: Bases Loaded	WIN, NS2, PS5, XBX/S	Remaster	Brawler	City Connection, Irem	City Connection	
December 10	Picross S Climax (JP)	NS, NS2	Original	Puzzle	Jupiter Corporation		
December 10	Professor Layton and the New World of Steam	WIN, NS, NS2, PS5	Original	Puzzle, Adventure	Level-5 Osaka Office	Level-5	
December 10	Ravenswatch - Nintendo Switch 2 Edition (WW)	NS2	Port	Action, Rougelike	Passtech Games	Nacon	
December 10	Super Yanoman Collection (Note: Includes Song Master, Trinea, and Feda: The Emblem of Justice.) (JP)	WIN, NS, NS2, PS5	Compilation	—N/a	Edia		
December 10	Shikhondo: Blue Pieta	NS, NS2, PS5	Port	Bullet hell, Shoot' em up	DeerFarm	CFK	
December 10	Stage Tour	WIN, NS2, PS5, XBX/S	Original	Rhythm	RedOctane Games		
December 10	Tinker Islands	WIN	Early access	Adventure, Sandbox	Goon Squad	Headup	
December 11	Path of Exile 2	WIN, PS5, XBX/S	Full release	Action RPG	Grinding Gear Games		
December 14	Dome Keeper	NS, PS5	Port	Action, Rougelike	Bippinbits	Raw Fury	
December 14	Silver Palace	WIN, PS5, iOS, DROID	Original	Action RPG	Silver Studio	Elementa	
December 15	Commandos: Origins Deluxe Edition	NS2	Port	RTS	Claymore Game Studios, Engine Software	Kalypso Media	
December 15	Elements Destiny	NS	Port	RPG	ShrooMoon UG	Deck13 Spotlight	
December 16	The First Zombie	WIN, NS	Original	Action, Simulation	Phoenixx		
December 17	Ao Oni: The Horror of Blueberry Onsen Plus	PS5	Port	Horror	Game Studio	Game Studio, LiTMUS	
December 17	Ao Oni 2	PS5	Port	Horror	Game Studio	Game Studio, LiTMUS	
December 17	Sunsoft is Back! Retro Game Selection 2 (Note: Includes Super Arabian, Ikki, The Mystery of Atlantis and Maharaja)	WIN, NS, PS5	Compilation	—N/a	Sunsoft		
December 17	Uta no Prince-sama: Shining Live (JP)	NS	Port	Rhythm	Broccoli		
December 18	Ravenswatch - Nintendo Switch 2 Edition (NA)	NS2	Port	Action, Rougelike	Passtech Games	Nacon	
December 24	Dungeon Artifact (JP)	NS, PS4	Port	Deck building, Roguelike	itokon	Entergram, ExertionGame	
December	Mercenaries Grace: Black Feather and the Golden Right Arm (JP)	NS	Port	Tactical RPG	RideonJapan		
December	Palia – Nintendo Switch 2 Edition	NS2	Port	Life sim, MMO	Singularity 6		
December	Rhythm Doctor	NS, NS2	Port	Rhythm	7th Beat Games		
December	There Are No Ghosts at the Grand	WIN	Early access	Simulation, Adventure	Friday Sundae		

- ← Jan
- Feb
- Mar
- Apr
- May
- Jun
- Jul
- Aug
- Sep
- Oct
- Nov
- Dec
- TBD →

=== Unscheduled releases ===
Title	Approximate date (Note: The calendar year is divided into four quarters, often abbreviated Q1 (January to March), Q2 (April to June), Q3 (July to September) and Q4 (October to December).)	Platform(s)	Type(s)	Genre(s)	Developer(s)	Publisher(s)	Ref.
.45 Parabellum Bloodhound	Unknown	WIN	Original	Action	Sukeban Games		
34Everlast	Unknown	WIN		Action	Kanata Lab, Hyper Real	Playism	
AGNI: Village of Calamity	Unknown	WIN, PS5, XBX/S	Original	Survival horror	Separuh Interactive	Wired Productions	
The Alighieri Circle: Dante's Bloodline	Q4	NS2	Port	Horror (psych)	One-O-One Games	C&R Creative Studios, Entalto Publishing	
Ame no Chi Hare Onna (JP)	Q4	iOS, DROID	Original	Casual	Chronogate, Game Freak	Game Freak	
Animal Use Protocol	Q4	WIN		Survival horror	The Brotherhood		
Another Door	Unknown	WIN	Original	Roguelike	Mizar & Alcor Interactive	No More Robots	
Assetto Corsa EVO	Unknown	WIN	Full release	Racing (sim)	Kunos Simulazioni	505 Games	
Atomic Heart 2	Unknown	WIN, consoles	Original	Action-adventure, RPG	Mundfish		
Avemary Rocket: Captain Patchwork	Unknown	WIN		Action-adventure	Stesan Games	room6	
Awaysis	Unknown	WIN, PS5, XBX/S		Dungeon crawl, Action-adventure	17-Bit	Cult Games	
Barkour	Q4	WIN, PS5, XBX/S	Original	Action, Stealth	VARSAV Game Studios		
Battle Vision Network	Unknown	WIN		Puzzle, Strategy	Capybara Games		
The Big Catch	Unknown	WIN, OSX, LIN		Platformer	Filet Group	Xseed Games	
Bless You Again	Unknown	WIN	Original	Action, Roguelite	Gino Inc.		
Bokosuka Wars II	Unknown	WIN	Port	Tactical RPG	Pygmy Studio		
Bounty Sisters (WW)	Q4	NS	Original	Shoot 'em up	PiXEL		
Boyhood's End	Unknown	WIN	Full release	Horror, Adventure	Buriki Clock, WSS Playground	WSS Playground, Alliance Arts	
BPM Bitcrushed	Unknown	WIN, NS, PS5, XBX/S		Roguelike, Rhythm, Dungeon crawl	Awe Interactive	Kwalee	
Broken Sword: The Smoking Mirror – Reforged	Unknown	WIN, OSX, LIN, NS, PS5, XBO, XBX/S	Remaster	PCA	Revolution Software		
Building Relationships	Unknown	WIN, OSX, PS5, XBX/S	Original	Adventure, Dating sim	Tan Ant Games		
Card Make Arena	Unknown	WIN	Early access	Deck building	Lizardry	Playism	
Chernobylite 2: Exclusion Zone	Unknown	WIN, PS5, XBX/S	Full release	Action RPG	The Farm 51		(Note: The Farm 51 (December 18, 2025). "Chernobylite 2: Exclusion Zone - Megapatch 06 - (Not Yet) Butter Smooth". Steam. "Full & final Chernobylite 2: Exclusion Zone release for PC is going to happen in 2026! When exactly? We can't confirm it officially yet but most likely in Q1/Q2!")
Coromon: Rogue Planet	Unknown	WIN, OSX, NS, iOS, DROID		RPG	TRAGsoft	indie.io	
Corpse Party II: Darkness Distortion	Unknown	WIN, NS, PS4, PS5		Horror	Team GrisGris	JP: Mages; WW: Xseed Games	
Cthulhu Mythos ADV Lunatic Whispers & The Isle Of Ubohoth (WW)	Q4	NS, PS4, PS5	Compilation	Visual novel, RPG	Gotcha Gotcha Games		
Danger Mouse	Unknown	WIN, NS, PS4, PS5, XBX/S		Action	Art of Play		
Dark Mass	Q4	WIN, PS5, XBX/S	Original	Horror (psych)	Path Games		
Demonschool	Unknown	NS2	Port	Tactical RPG	Necrosoft Games	Ysbyrd Games	
Depth Loop (JP)	Unknown	WIN, NS, NS2, PS4, PS5		Visual novel	Kemco		
Deus Ex: Remastered	Unknown	WIN, NS, PS5, XBX/S	Remaster	Action RPG, Stealth	Aspyr, Eidos-Montréal	Aspyr	
Dice Gambit	Q4	NS, PS4, PS5	Port	Tactical RPG	Chromatic Ink	Silesia Games, Spelkollektivet, WhisperGames	
Digital Pinball: Last Gladiators	Unknown	WIN, NS, NS2	Port	Pinball	BeXide, KAZe	BeXide	
Dinghai: The Ocean Pillar	Unknown	WIN	Original	Action RPG, Roguelike	Justdan International		
Dodo Duckie!	Unknown	NS, PS5	Port	Puzzle-platformer	BornMonkie	SoloGame	
Don't Kill Them All	Q4	WIN	Early access	TBS	Fika Productions		
DoubleShake	Unknown	WIN, NS, PS4, PS5		Platformer	Rightstick Studios	Limited Run Games	
DreadOut 3	Unknown	WIN		Horror	Digital Happiness	Soft Source Publishing	
Dumb Ways to Party	Unknown	WIN, NS, NS2, PS4, PS5, XBO, XBX/S		Party	PlaySide Studios		
DuneCrawl	Q4	NS, NS2	Port	Action-adventure	Alientrap		
The Dungeon Experience	Unknown	WIN		Adventure	Bone Assembly	Devolver Digital	
Dungeons of Dusk	Unknown	WIN, LIN, NS, NS2, PS5, XBX/S, iOS, DROID	Original	Dungeon crawl, RPG	68k Studios	New Blood Interactive	
Earthion	Unknown	GEN		Shoot 'em up	Ancient	Limited Run Games, Superdeluxe Games	
EDEN.schemata();	Unknown	WIN		Adventure, Visual novel	illuCalab, WSS Playground	Alliance Arts	
Edenfall: Legacy of the First Wardens	Q4	WIN	Original	Action-adventure	Everflux Games		
Erosion	Q4	WIN, PS5, XBX/S	Full release	Action, Roguelike	Plot Twist	Lyrical Games	
The Eternal Life of Goldman	Unknown	WIN, NS, PS5, XBX/S		Platformer	Weappy	THQ Nordic	
The Explorator	Q4	WIN	Full release	FPS	Remnant Games Studio		
Farmbotic	Unknown	WIN, PS5, XBX/S	Original	Farming	Frozen Way		
Farsight	Unknown	WIN, consoles	Original	Horror (psych)	Studio Noori		
Fellowship	Unknown	WIN	Full release	Dungeon crawl, Action RPG	Chief Rebel	Arc Games	
Glaciered	Unknown	WIN, NS2	Original	Action-adventure	Studio Snowblind	Playism	
Golf With Your Friends 2	Q4	WIN, NS2, PS5, XBX/S	Original	Sports, Casual	Radical Forge	Team17	
Guildrun	Q4	WIN, OSX	Original	Auto battler, Roguelike	Leyline		
Gungrave G.O.R.E: Blood Heat	Unknown	WIN, PS5, XBX/S	Remake	TPS	Studio IGGYMOB		
Gunny Ascend	Q4	WIN	Original	Puzzle, Roguelite	Sunna Entertainment	Sunna Entertainment, Outersloth	
Haruka: Beyond the Stars	Unknown	WIN		Action RPG	Atelier Mimina	Playism	
Heroes of Newerth: Reborn	Unknown	WIN	Remake	MOBA	Kongor Games	iGAMES	
Hollow Knight: Silksong – Sea of Sorrow	Unknown	WIN, OSX, LIN, NS, NS2, PS4, PS5, XBO, XBX/S	Expansion	Metroidvania	Team Cherry		
Hozy	Unknown	NS	Port	Cozy	Come On Games	tinyBuild	
Hubert	Q4	PS5	Port	Adventure	Brocap Studio		
Human: Fall Flat 2	Unknown	WIN, NS2	Original	Puzzle-platformer	No Brakes Games	Devolver Digital	
IKUMA: The Frozen Compass	Unknown	WIN, PS5, XBX/S		Narrative adventure	Mooneye Studios		
Inazuma Eleven RE	Unknown	WIN, NS, NS2, PS5	Original	Sports, RPG	Level-5		
Infinitesimals	Unknown	WIN, PS5, XBX/S		TPS, Action-adventure	Cubit Studios	Epic Games Publishing	
Inkblood	Unknown	WIN		Adventure	Hey! Bird	Critical Reflex	
Into the Fire	Unknown	WIN	Full release	Action-adventure, Survival	Starward Industries		
Jaleco Arcade Collection Vol. 1	Q4	WIN, NS, PS5	Compilation	—N/a	Gravity Game Arise		
Jaleco Arcade Collection Vol. 2	Q4	WIN, NS, PS5	Compilation	—N/a	Gravity Game Arise		
Janet DeMornay Is A Slumlord (and a witch)	Unknown	WIN, OSX, PS5	Original	Horror	Fuzzy Ghost		
Kitsune: The Journey of Adashino	Q4	WIN, OSX, NS		Action-adventure	Rias	room6, Yokaze	
Leaf Blower Co.	Q4	PS5, XBX/S	Port	Simulation	LifT Games	Forklift Interactive	
The Legend of California	Unknown	WIN	Early Access	FPS, Survival	Kintsugiyama	Dreamhaven	
Limit Zero Breakers	Unknown	WIN, iOS, DROID		Action RPG	Vic Game Studios	NCSoft	
Little Kitty, Big City	Q4	iOS, DROID	Port	Adventure	Double Dagger Studio		
Little Samson	Unknown	WIN, NS, PS5		Platformer	Takeru, Limited Run Games	Limited Run Games	
Lost Hellden	Unknown	WIN, NS, PS4, PS5, XBX/S		RPG	Artisan Studios	Kwalee	
Lost Skies	Unknown	PS5, XBX/S	Port	Survival, Adventure	Bossa Games	Balor Games	
Lucid	Unknown	WIN	Original	Metroidvania, Action, Platformer	The Matte Black Studio	Apogee Entertainment	
LumenTale: Memories of Trey	Unknown	PS5, XBX/S	Port	Monster tamer, RPG	Beehive Studios	Team17	
Mago: Hyperdelicious Edition	Q4	NS, PS4, PS5, XBO, XBX/S	Port	Platformer	Dream Potion Games, Resistance Studio	Abonico Game Works, Hidden Trap, Selecta Play	
Maximum Thunderness	Unknown	WIN	Original	Action, Roguelike	Berzerk Studio		
MEDIEVAL	Q4	WIN, PS5, XBX/S	Original	Action-adventure	Cypronia		
Mightreya	Unknown	WIN	Original	Action-adventure	Wazen	505 Games	
Monochrome Echoes: White	Unknown	NS	Port	RPG	Thousand Games	mebius	
Monowave	Q4	PS5, XBX/S	Port	Puzzle-platformer	Studio BBB	Phoenixx	
Moonlight Pale	Q4	WIN, NS, PS4, PS5, XBX/S	Original	Survival horror	Blue Lily	LightWitch	
MUDANG: Two Hearts	Unknown	WIN, PS5, XBX/S		Action-adventure	EVR STUDIO		
Neath	Unknown	WIN		Roguelike, Tactical RPG	Cellar Door Games		
Nightmare Busters Rebirth	Unknown	WIN, NS, NS2, PS4, PS5		Action, Run and gun	Aurora Game Studio	Pix'n Love	
Nirvana Noir	Unknown	WIN, XBO, XBX/S	Original	Adventure	Feral Cat Den	Fellow Traveller	
No Straight Roads 2	Unknown	WIN, consoles		Action-adventure	Metronomik	Shueisha Games	
Nobunaga's Ambition: Hishou (JP/AS)	Q4	WIN, NS, NS2, PS5	Original	TBT	Kou Shibusawa	Koei Tecmo	
Oh Demon! Fix My TV	Unknown	PS5	Port	Adventure, Horror	Melt, Mister Jagger	Melt, Mister Jagger, Selecta Play	
Opus: Prism Peak	Unknown	PS5	Port	Adventure	Sigono	Shueisha Games	
Order Up!!	Unknown	NS2	Port	Cooking	SuperVillain Studios	Nicalis	
Out of Words	Unknown	WIN, NS2, PS5, XBX/S		Platformer, Adventure	Kong Orange, Wired Fly, Morten Søndergaard	Epic Games Publishing	
Palworld Online	Unknown	iOS, DROID	Original	Survival, MMO	Garena		
Paper Shredder	Q4	WIN, XBX/S	Original	Simulation	Embers		
Parasite Mutant	Unknown	WIN, PS5		Horror, RPG	IceSitruuna		
The Player Who Can't Level Up	Unknown	WIN	Early access	Roguelike, Action	Tripearl Games		
Pokémon Colosseum	Unknown	NS2	Port	Monster tamer	Genius Sonority	JP: The Pokémon Company; WW: Nintendo	
Project Evilbane	Q4	WIN		Action RPG	Netmarble Monster	Netmarble	
Projekt Z: Beyond Order	Unknown	WIN, LIN, PS5, XBX/S		FPS	314 Arts	Maximum Entertainment	(Note: 314 Arts (August 20, 2025). "An Update on Projekt Z's Release". Steam. "We're shifting our launch to 2026.")
Protocol: Terminate	Q4	WIN		FPS	One HP Studio		
Rain98	Unknown	WIN		Adventure	C#4R4CT3R		
Rainbow Billy: The Book of Fears	Unknown	WIN	Original	Adventure	ManaVoid Entertainment		
Re:VER PROJECT -TOKYO-	Unknown	WIN		Survival, Adventure	Toei Animation, Nestopi		
R.E.P.O.	Unknown	WIN	Full release	Horror	Semiwork		
ReStory	Unknown	DROID	Port	Simulation	Mandragora	tinyBuild	
Robo Frenzy	Unknown	WIN, NS, XBX/S		Brawler	YummyYummyTummy, Tamatin Entertainment		
RollerCoaster Tycoon Wonderworks	Q4	WIN	Early access	CMS	Springloaded	Atari	
Rootbound	Unknown	WIN		Action-adventure	Brainlag Games		
Rules of Engagement: The Grey State	Unknown	WIN		FPS, Tactical RPG	Grey State Studio		
Sanitarium Enhanced	Unknown	WIN, NS, PS4, PS5, XBX/S	Remaster	PCA	DreamForge Intertainment, QUByte Interactive	Ziggurat Interactive	
Seasons of Books and Keys	Q4	WIN, NS	Original	Visual novel	iMel	Shueisha Games	
Sengoku Baccarat	Unknown	WIN		Deck building	Q-Cumber Factory	Flyhigh Works	
Senran Kagura: Shinovi NEXUS (JP)	Unknown	iOS, DROID	Original	RPG	Honey Parade Games	Marvelous	
Serial World	Unknown	WIN, OSX, LIN		Deck building, RPG	Serial Project	Kakehashi Games	
Shangri-La Frontier: The Seven Colossi (JP)	Unknown	WIN, iOS, DROID	Original	Unknown	Netmarble Nexus	Netmarble	
Showa American Story	Unknown	WIN, PS5	Original	Action RPG	NEKCOM Games	4Divinity, 2P Games	
skate.	Unknown	WIN, PS4, PS5, XBO, XBX/S	Full release	Sports	Full Circle	Electronic Arts	
Slam City with Scottie Pippen: Respect Edition	Unknown	NS, PS4, PS5, XBX/S		Interactive film	Digital Pictures, Screaming Villains, Limited Run Games	Limited Run Games	
Something is Wrong with the Library	Q4	WIN	Original	Simulation	Strange Scaffold	Strange Scaffold, Frosty Pop	
The Streamer's Alt Account Labyrinth	Unknown	WIN, OSX, NS	Original	Visual novel, RPG	Acacia	G-Mode	
Sugar Lies	Q4	WIN	Original	Visual novel	Kogado Studio		
Tactics Wanderer	Q4	WIN	Original	Tactical RPG	Critical Damage Studio		
Tako no Himitsu: Ocean of Secrets	Unknown	WIN, NS	Original	Action RPG	Deneos Games		
To Kill a God	Unknown	WIN, LIN	Early access	Action, Roguelike	Glitch Factory	Mad Mushroom	
Tomo: Endless Blue	Q4	WIN, OSX, LIN, NS2	Original	Action RPG	Onibi		
Touhou Hero of Ice Fairy	Unknown	NS		Bullet hell	Gamepulse	Gamepulse, Phoenixx	
Toxic Crusaders	Unknown	WIN, NS, PS4, PS5, XBO, XBX/S	Original	Brawler	Retroware		
Tsurugihime	Unknown	WIN	Early access	Action RPG	Fahrenheit 213		
Undergrounded	Q4	NS	Port	Puzzle, Adventure	Game Studio	room6, Aksys Games	
VIVA NOBOTS	Unknown	WIN	Original	Action	Shueisha Games, Digital Works Entertainment	Shueisha Games	
Warhammer 40,000: Space Marine 2	Q4	NS2	Port	TPS, Hack and slash	Saber Interactive	Focus Entertainment	
What Goes Up	Unknown	WIN, PS5, XBX/S	Original	Puzzle	Bossa Games	Team17	
Wildekin	Unknown	WIN, XBO, XBX/S		Adventure	Cute Newt	Chucklefish	
Windblown	Unknown	WIN	Full release	Action, Roguelike	Motion Twin		
Witchfire	Q4	WIN	Full release	FPS	The Astronauts		
Wolfhound	Unknown	WIN, OSX, LIN, NS, PS5		Metroidvania	Bit Kid		
Xelan Force AE (JP)	Unknown	WIN, NS, PS5		Scrolling shooter (horizontal)	PiXEL		
Zaleste (JP)	Unknown	NS, PS4, PS5		Shoot 'em up	M2	Compile Heart	
