= Guts & Glory =

Guts & Glory may refer to:

- Guts & Glory (TV series), an American reality television series
- Guts & Glory (book series), a book series by Ben Thompson
- Guts and Glory, a 3D simulation video game
- Guts and Glory, an album by Peer Günt
