= Ferocious (video game) =

- Developer: OMYOG
- Publisher: TinyBuild
- Engine: Unity
- Platform: Microsoft Windows Xbox Series X Xbox Series S PlayStation 5
- Release: December 4, 2025 (Windows) & September 15, 2026 (Xbox Series X & Xbox Series S & PlayStation 5)
- Mode: Single-player

Ferocious (stylized as FEROCIOUS) is a 2025 indie survival first-person shooter video game developed by OMYOG and published by TinyBuild. Released for Microsoft Windows on December 4, 2025 and Xbox Series X|S and PlayStation 5 on September 15, 2026. It combines elements of survival, and exploration gameplay in a single-player campaign set on a remote island inhabited by prehistoric wildlife, hostile mercenaries, and advanced military technology.

== Plot ==
It starts with protagonist named San Win who woke up after becoming stranded on an isolated island whose ecosystem has remained largely untouched by the outside world. The island contains dense jungles, ancient ruins, hazardous terrain, and a wide variety of pre-historic creatures, including numerous dinosaur species occupying different ecological niches. While attempting to survive and escape, San discovers that the island has also become the target of a heavily armed private military forces seeking to exploit resources and wildlife.

Progressing the campaign, players confront both human enemies and indigenous predators while uncovering evidence of the island's hidden history. Combat frequently involves three-way conflicts between mercenaries, dinosaurs, and the player, allowing encounters to develop dynamically depending on environmental conditions and creature behavior. Exploration reveals abandoned facilities, archaeological remnants, and experimental technology connected to the island's secrets. Resource gathering and crafting play a significant role in progression, enabling players to construct weapons, equipment, and survival tools suited to different threats.

== Gameplay ==
Players can explore a large island inhabited by dinosaurs, hostile mercenaries, and robotic enemies while scavenging resources to craft weapons, ammunition, medical supplies, and equipment. Combat features both firearms and melee weapons, with players encouraged to use the environment and the island's wildlife to gain an advantage over enemies.

A central gameplay mechanic is the Dino Control Device (DCD), which allows players to scan and command certain dinosaur species. Depending on the creature, dinosaurs can be ordered to follow the player, attack enemies, destroy obstacles, retrieve items, or assist in infiltrating enemy-held areas. Not all prehistoric animals can be controlled, and each controllable species possesses unique abilities that contribute to exploration and combat. The game also features weapon customization, environmental puzzles, and optional exploration that rewards players with hidden equipment, resources, and secrets scattered throughout the island.

== Development ==
Publisher TinyBuild partnered with German independent studio OMYOG to distribute the game and promote trailers. It was made using Unity game engine. It began several years in development before the release date, with early teaser revealing the game's photorealistic graphics, and large-scale dinosaur encounters. It is inspired by media franchises such as Jurassic Park, King Kong, Ubisoft's Far Cry, and Capcom's video game series Dino Crisis. The gameplay's elements are also inspired by Crytek's FPS series Crysis.

== Reception ==
GamingBolt awarded the game 7/10, describing it as "a callback to an era of shooters where all that really mattered was the action." The review praised its fast-paced combat, environmental design, and nostalgic approach to first-person shooters, while noting that technical shortcomings and repetitive mission design prevented it from reaching its full potential.

Eurogamer Germany gave the game 4/10, comparing it to "Far Cry with dinosaurs" while arguing that numerous bugs, unfinished mechanics, and optimization issues made it difficult to recommend despite its strong premise and attractive environments.

Game8 scored FEROCIOUS 74/100, calling it "a perfect example of getting the vibe right." The reviewer commended its tense atmosphere, visual presentation, and satisfying gunplay, but criticized the gameplay loop, enemy AI, and rough mechanics, concluding that the game's ambition exceeded its execution.

Some critics noted that the game's visuals gave the impression of a major studio release, potentially setting misleading expectations. It is, in fact, an independent title developed by a very small team and sold at a budget price point. Considering its limited development resources, critics viewed the game's technical execution as a notable achievement.
