= Nurudeen Alowonle Yusuf =

Nigerian military officer

Colonel Nurudeen Alowonle Yusuf
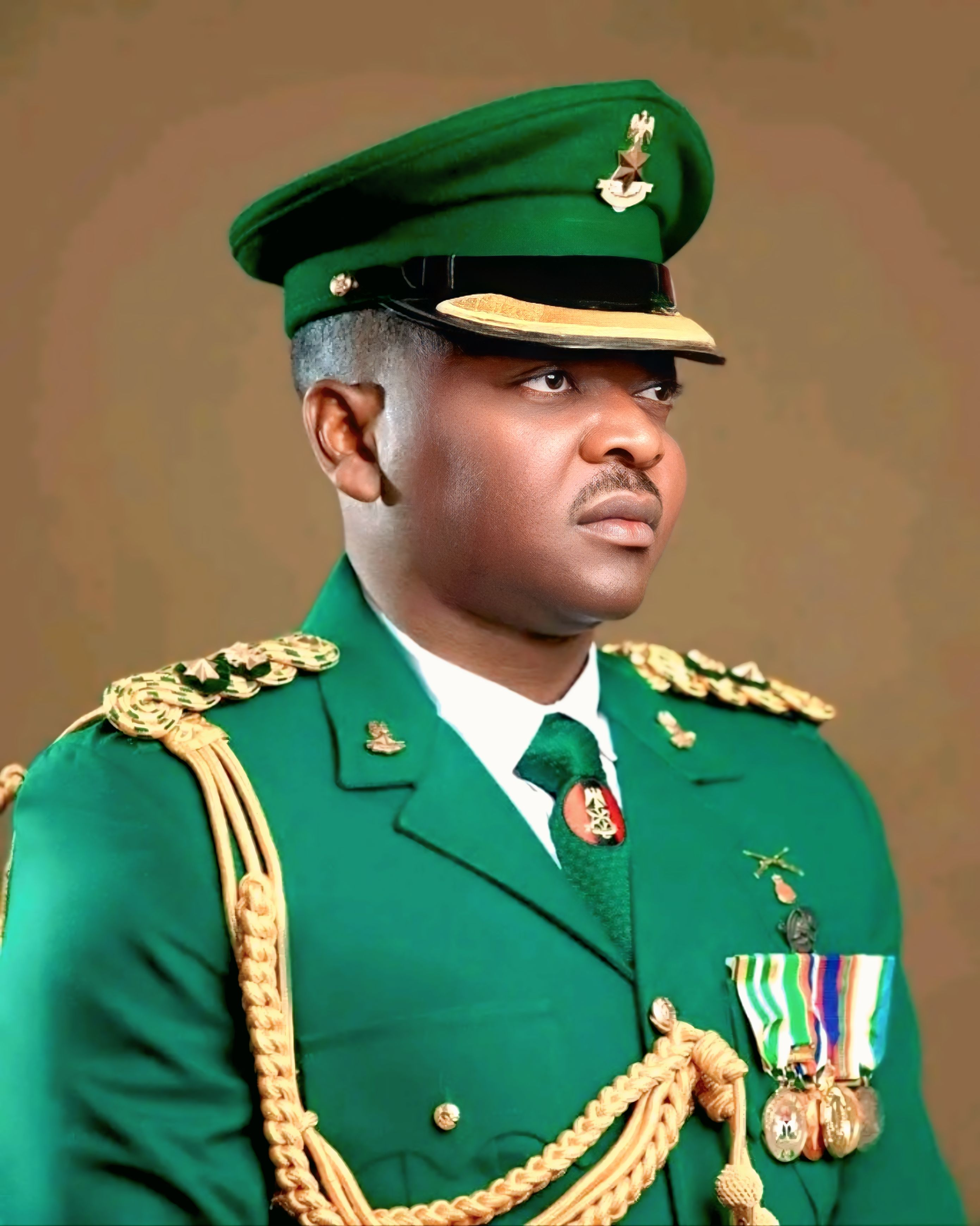
- Born: Ilemona, Oyun LGA, Kwara State
- Alma mater: King's College London, National Open University, Royal Military Academy Sandhurst, Nigerian Defence Academy, Federal Polytechnic Offa
- Military career
- Allegiance: Nigeria
- Branch: Nigerian Army
- Service years: 2000–present
- Rank: Colonel

Colonel Nurudeen Alowonle Yusuf is a Nigerian army officer who is currently serving as aide-de-camp to the president of Nigeria, Bola Tinubu. Yusuf served in the Presidential Villa during the administration of former president Goodluck Jonathan.

== Early life and education ==
Yusuf was born to the family of Oba Yusuf Omokanye Oyekanmi, the Elemona of Ilemona in Oyun Local Government Area of Kwara State.

In 2000, Yusuf received a diploma in computer science from Federal Polytechnic Offa, after which he received a Bachelor of Science in engineering from the Nigerian Defence Academy. Between 2004 and 2005, he attended the Royal Military Academy Sandhurst. In 2007, he attended the Young Officer's Course Infantry, and completed the Tactical Intelligence Officers and Security Investigations courses in 2008. Yusuf earned his master's degree in defence studies from King's College London in 2018, then received a postgraduate diploma in Peace Studies and Conflict Resolution from the National Open University.

== Installation as king ==
In July 2024, following the death of his father, the late Oba Yusuf Omokanye Oyekanmi, the Elemona of Ilemona in Oyun Local Government Area of Kwara State, Yusuf was chosen by community kingmakers as the new Elemona (traditional ruler) of Ilemona. After requisite approvals, he received his staff of office from the Governor of Kwara State, AbdulRahman AbdulRazaq. Although appointed king, Yusuf opted to maintain his role as presidential ADC, appointing a regent to oversee the traditional throne until he retires from military service.

== Career ==
In year 2015, Yusuf was promoted to Officer Commanding, Presidential Body Guard, State House, Abuja.

In 2017, he served in the Nigerian Army as Staff Officer Grade 1 for the Nigerian Army Intelligence Corp.

On 1 May 2023, Yusuf was appointed as President Bola Ahmed Tinubu Aide-De-Camp.
