= Party Hard =

Party Hard may refer to:

- "Party Hard" (Andrew W.K. song), a song by Andrew W.K..
- "Party Hard" (Pulp song), a song by Pulp
- Party Hard, an album by Donae'o
- Party Hard (video game), a 2015 Ukrainian video game
- "Party Hard / Cadillac (Interlude)", a song from Fortune (Chris Brown album)
- Party Hardy, an episode from Hidden Palms
