= Probably Stolen =

2026 simulation video game

- Developer: Questing Goose Studio
- Publisher: tinyBuild
- Platform: Windows
- Release: October 28, 2026
- Genre: Simulation
- Mode: Single-player

Probably Stolen is a 2026 single-player shopkeeping simulation video game (sim) developed by Questing Goose Studio and published by tinyBuild. It was released for Windows on October 28, 2026. Set on a space station in a cyberpunk dystopia, players assume the role of a shopkeeper who buys and sells goods while managing the demands of customers and rival factions.

== Gameplay ==
Probably Stolen is a single-player sim that takes place inside a space station in a cyberpunk dystopia. Players control a shopkeeper running a store in an area called the Lower Levels, which is controlled by competing political and criminal factions. At the start of the game, players choose a starting specialization, which determines their initial supplies and resources. Options include an apprentice, a hydroponic farmer, and a "rock bottom" scenario in which the player begins without goods or money.

The people on the station can be con artists, undercover agents, wanted criminals or humans affected by rogue artificial-intelligence, and players must identify them among the shop's visitors. Players sell different goods to visitors and inspect merchandise. As the game progresses, players make decisions based on morality and faction loyalty. Faction relationships can bring benefits, such as discounts and donations, or disadvantages, including security checks and fewer customers.

== Release ==
tinyBuild and Questing Goose Studio announced Probably Stolen on August 3, 2026, alongside the availability of a PC playtest. On September 14, they released a demo of the game. During the October Steam Next Fest, the Probably Stolen demo reached 34,230 concurrent players. The full game was released on October 28.

== Reception ==
=== Pre-release coverage ===
Reviewers who previewed the demo of Probably Stolen compared its gameplay to Papers, Please and said it felt like running a store in Cyberpunk 2077. Christopher Livingston of PC Gamer wrote that he enjoyed the gameplay in the demo. Austin Wood of GamesRadar+ praised the demo's pixel art and responsive interface.

=== Reviews ===
Cosmin Vasile of Softpedia rated the game 8 out of 10 and praised its faction system and challenging gameplay. He said the game had "great replay value", but it felt repetitive later in his playthrough. He also noted that he encountered some technical issues while playing.
