= The Void (video game) =

2008 video game

- Cover art
- Developer: Ice-Pick Lodge
- Publishers: CIS: ND Games; EU: Mamba Games; POL: Techland; GER: Atari
- Composer: Vasily "Mushroomer" Kashnikov
- Engine: Ice-Peak Engine
- Platform: Microsoft Windows
- Release: CIS: 2008-04-17; EU: 2009-10-23; NA: 2009-12-15
- Genre: Adventure
- Mode: Single-player

The Void, also known as Tension (Russian: Тургор/Turgor), is a 2008 Russian first-person adventure video game developed by the Russian studio Ice-Pick Lodge and published in Russia, other CIS-countries, and Poland by ND Games on 17 April 2008. It won the "Most Original Game" award at the Russian Game Developers Conference, KRI in 2007. The game was released in English-speaking regions on October 23, 2009, and then as a digital download on Steam on December 16, 2009.

== Synopsis ==
The player takes on the role of a lost soul that accidentally lingers in a place called "the Void" before meeting its absolute death. The Void is a purgatory-like place, in which the most valuable thing is Color, a liquid that represents lifeforce. Color is scarce, and the Void's inhabitants are plagued by famine. These inhabitants are beautiful naked Sisters and monstrously deformed Brothers, two conflicting factions that the player must interact with. Color is a universal resource in the game — it functions as the player's health, armor, stats and ammo. With the help of Nameless Sister, the player finds out that there is a way to escape the Void and be reincarnated on the "surface", but in order to do this, the player must pose as one of the Brothers and eventually confront them.

Over time, the Brothers will reveal themselves in the game. These Brothers are: Mantid, the "Elder" of the Brothers, who walks on stilts and has a spear impaled through his abdomen; Whaler, who wields two blades and whose head is sewn onto his back; Pit, who is fused with a mining drill; Ironclad, who has multiple cannons that fire at the player; Tyrant, who has several limbs and heads along with three visible hearts and who rolls along on a stone wheel; Caterpillar, who is connected to a rolling sphere or spheres through tubes in his abdominal area; Warden, who forms a cage made of his ribs and hangs from the ceiling like a swinging birdcage; Montgolfier—who, in the Russian version, had hair, but in the English version, does not—is fused with a hot air balloon; Triumphator, who is fused with a large, gear-powered phonograph and acts as a one-man band; and Patriarch, the oldest of the Brothers, who is similar to a senior in a wheelchair and appears to have no head.

The Brothers, depending on the player's actions, may act aggressively; some might also be unsure of or sympathetic to the protagonist. Patriarch and Montgolfier are said by the other Brothers to be the most fond of the protagonist, followed by Caterpillar and Triumphator. Tyrant and Warden are probably the most domineering of the Brothers, along with Pit and Whaler, who perceive the player negatively. Mantid and Ironclad are generally neutral, although their behavior may change based on the player's actions.

== Gameplay ==
The Void is played from a first-person perspective. Color, the character's primary resource, exists "naturally" in the Void as Lympha. However, collected Lympha of Color cannot be used directly and must be processed in the hero's Hearts first, where it is slowly drained out, becoming Nerva. Each Heart also corresponds to a glyph; more complex game actions are done by drawing Nerva-infused glyphs on screen using the mouse. When drawing a glyph, time slows down to allow the player to carefully draw it. Typical game actions are talking to NPCs, fighting predators or Brothers, collecting plants and growing gardens.

The Color inside Hearts also acts as the hero's health and character stats. There are seven Colors at the player's disposal — Silver, Gold, Violet, Azure, Crimson, Amber and Emerald – each one having its own properties while inside Hearts and how they affect the Void when used; for example, Gold increases the Sisters' trust while inside Hearts, lowering the amount of Color required to open their hearts, but when used in the Void it incites jealousy in the Brothers, making them more prompt to rip opened hearts out of the Sisters.

The strategic part of the game takes place on the map of the Void. The Void consists of several domains associated with specific Sisters. Each domain in turn consists of several chambers. When the player is on the map, time flows and Color is processed in the hero's Hearts. If no Color is left inside, the hero will die. Time stops when the player is in a chamber, so that the player can explore locations without time pressure.

The game has a fixed time limit of 35 cycles (a cycle represents a rough equivalent to an in-game day). New Color appears at the beginning of a new cycle, but what color that cycle brings is random.

== Reception ==
Reception

Aggregate scores
Aggregator	Score
GameRankings	73.29%
Metacritic	77

Review scores
Publication	Score
Eurogamer	7/10
Absolute Games	75%
Adventure Classic Gaming	2/5

Award
Publication	Award
Russian Game Developers Conference, KRI	Most Non-Standard Game

Overall, the game has received positive reviews in Russia and abroad, with the exception being the Polish press that played the non-director's cut edition. The German version, the director's cut of the Russian version, received more favorable reactions ranging from medium to high scores. In the first international reviews the game got high scores, and enthusiastic praise from Rock, Paper, Shotgun.

In the first English-language review, Resolution claimed it to be rarely fun, but offering "a viciously beautiful, enormously interesting experience." Rock, Paper, Shotgun wrote an overwhelmingly positive review, saying "The Void is the most important game you are GOING TO FUCKING PLAY."

=== Piracy ===
The Void was noted in Russia for its developers' reaction to piracy. When the game appeared on the largest Russian torrents.ru tracker, the developers talked to the downloaders in the thread, answered game related questions and encouraged them to buy the game if they liked it. Also, the developers made an official torrent containing all bonus material from the gift edition.

== Editions and titles ==
The game was released in several countries under different titles and with minor and major changes.

- Turgor — the initial Russian release, on April 17, 2008. This edition is available in the form of a two-DVD jewel box, a gift edition and a digital download. The bonus disk contains a full soundtrack, all the trailers ever made for the game, Nikolay Dybowskiy's recordings from KRI, a game music video about Pathologic, and artwork from the game. Though this edition was only released in Russian, there is an official subtitle patch available from one of the developers.
- Tension — the working English title of the game and the official title in Poland. The Polish edition included the game disk, a bonus disk with a part of the soundtrack, a user manual, an official walkthrough and an artbook. This edition doesn't include the bonuses from the Russian version. Includes the first patch.
- The Void (German edition) — this is the westernized edition of the game released on March 28, 2009, that has major differences from the initial release, such as a completely re-written story. The bonus disk contains a re-mastered soundtrack with new tracks, all trailers except video footage from KRI, the Pathologic game music video, and artwork.
- The Void (English edition) — the same as the German edition with the second patch. This edition was released in October 2009.
