= Lazy Bear Games =

Russian video game developer

- Industry: Video games
- Founded: 2012; 14 years ago
- Founders: Nikita Kulaga; Sviatoslav Cherkasov
- Headquarters: Vilnius, Lithuania
- Area served: Worldwide
- Website: lazybeargames.com

Lazy Bear Games is a video game development company based in Vilnius, Lithuania, founded by Russian video game developers Nikita Kulaga and Svyatoslav Cherkasov in St. Petersburg, Russia. The company frequently collaborates with tinyBuild and Uroboros Games.

== History ==
Lazy Bear Games was founded as GameJam (Or "Game Jam Studio") in 2010 and produced games under that name from 2010 till the studio was renamed Lazy Bear Games in April 2015. Although, their first three games developed in 2010 to 2012 were either cancelled or transferred to another company. They co-developed the story-driven city builder Fairy Kingdom HD for mobile platforms with the company Game Garden in 2012–2013. In 2013, they entered a "Next Castle Party 2013" contest where they worked on an arcade 2D MOBA/platformer called Rabbit Must Die for one week, and won two awards in two categories - best eSports game and audience award. It ran on the Web browser plugin, Unity Web Player. They were working on a management sim with a fighter/brawler theme and mechanism called VHS Story in 2014. However, it was only available in an alpha, online version at GameJolt. Then when they were renamed to "Lazy Bear Games", they also renamed the game VHS Story to Punch Club while continuing work on it and released it later in 2016.

== Games ==
=== Releases under "GameJam" label ===
Title	Year	Platform(s)	Developer(s)	Description
Fairy Kingdom HD	2012-2013	iOS, Android, Amazon	Game Garden, GameJam (Co-dev)	City builder City-building game
Rabbit Must Die	2014	Unity Web Player (Browser)	GameJam	MOBA, Platformer Platform game

=== Releases as Lazy Bear Games ===
Title	Year	Platform(s)	Description
Punch Club	2016	Microsoft Windows, OS X, iOS, Android, Xbox One, Nintendo Switch, Nintendo 3DS, PlayStation 4	Boxing match sporting management simulation
Graveyard Keeper	2018	Microsoft Windows, OS X, iOS, Android, Xbox One, Nintendo Switch, Linux, PlayStation 4	Graveyard-themed management simulation video game
Swag and Sorcery	2019	PC, iOS	Self-parody role-playing simulation
Punch Club 2: Fast Forward	2023	Nintendo Switch, PlayStation 5, PlayStation 4, Microsoft Windows, Xbox Series X and Series S, Xbox One	MMA match sporting management simulation
Bandle Tale: A League of Legends Story	2024	Nintendo Switch, Microsoft Windows	Crafting role-playing game in association with Riot Forge
Bloomtown: A Different Story	2024	Nintendo Switch, PlayStation 5, PlayStation 4, Microsoft Windows, Xbox Series X and Series S, Xbox One	Turn-based role-playing game. Сo-developed with Different Sense Games
Graveyard Keeper 2	2026	Microsoft Windows, Xbox Series X/S, PlayStation 5, Nintendo Switch 2, Nintendo Switch, PC	Graveyard-themed management simulation video game
