= ReStory =

- Developer: Mandragora
- Publisher: tinyBuild
- Composer: M. Harvey Bee
- Engine: Unity
- Platforms: Windows; macOS; Android
- Release: Windows, macOS; 6 August 2026; Android; 2026
- Genre: Job simulation
- Mode: Single-player

ReStory: Chill Electronics Repairs is a job simulation game developed by Mandragora and published by tinyBuild. Set in mid-2000s Japan, the game has the player operate an electronics repair shop and repair devices brought in by customers. It was released for Windows and macOS on 6 August 2026. A port for Android is scheduled to release later the same year.

== Gameplay ==
ReStory is set in an electronics repair shop in Akihabara, Tokyo, during the 2000s. The player disassembles, cleans, repairs and reassembles electronic devices brought in by customers, including phones, cameras and music players. The player must also make payments to a yakuza clan for protection, as well as pay the shop's rent and utilities.

The game has multiple endings determined by the player's progress through its objectives and interactions with non-player characters.

== Development and release ==
ReStory was developed by Mandragora, the developer of I Am Future: Cozy Apocalypse Survival. It was directed by Evgeny Kisterev. The game includes officially licensed Atari consoles through a partnership with the company.

tinyBuild announced ReStory in December 2025. A demo was released in June 2026 as part of Steam Next Fest. The game was released on 6 August 2026.

Shortly after release, tinyBuild permanently revoked 649 game keys that it said had been resold through grey market sites at discounted prices outside their intended regions. CEO Alex Nichiporchik described the sellers as "shady key reseller[s]". Some keys purchased through Green Man Gaming were also revoked, although affected customers were subsequently provided with replacements.

A port for Android was announced in October 2026 and is scheduled to release later the same year.

== Reception ==
Reception

Aggregate scores
Aggregator	Score
Metacritic	81/100 (Note: Based on 17 reviews)
OpenCritic	92% recommend (Note: Based on 24 reviews)

ReStory received "generally favorable" reviews from critics, according to review aggregator Metacritic. OpenCritic reported that 92% of critics recommended the game.

The game recouped its development budget within 12 hours of release and sold 300,000 copies during its first week.
