= Knock-Knock (video game) =

2013 video game

- Developer: Ice-Pick Lodge
- Publisher: Ice-Pick Lodge
- Director: Nikolay Dybowski
- Engine: Unity
- Platforms: Windows; OS X SteamOS; Linux iOS; Android; PlayStation 4 PlayStation Vita; Xbox One; Nintendo Switch
- Release: October 4, 2013: Windows, Linux, OS X October 4, 2013 iOS March 6, 2014 Android May 29, 2014 PlayStation 4; NA: September 10, 2015; PAL: February 18, 2016 PS Vita February 23, 2016 Xbox One; EU: August 22, 2017; NA: August 23, 2017 Switch October 31, 2018
- Genres: Adventure, survival horror
- Mode: Single-player

Knock-Knock (Russian: Тук-тук-тук, romanized: Tuk-tuk-tuk, IPA: [tuk tuk tuk]) is a 2013 survival horror video game developed and published by the Russian studio Ice-Pick Lodge. It takes place in a pseudo-3D side-scrolling environment.

== Gameplay ==
The main goal of the game is to help The Lodger survive until dawn. His house is surrounded by something which makes The Lodger fear strongly for his life. The player takes control of The Lodger and helps him survive by turning the lights on in every room of the house. The items in a room can only be interacted with once the light is on. There might be, for example, a clock which can help speed up the time, a place where The Lodger can hide, or just some decor items. At the same time, the more rooms are lit, the faster The Guests will come. When a Guest walks into a lit room, the lights go off.

The gameplay is also affected by The Lodger's poor physical condition. As an example, he suffers from an eye condition which makes him stand still after a turning on a light bulb to adjust to a change of lighting.

Time in Knock-Knock is relative and can even go backwards.

== Development ==
The developers claimed that Knock-Knock's design was sent to them by an outsider, and that the production followed his outline. Its lead designer within Ice-Pick was Nikolay Dybowski. The team based the game's design on the concepts of "obscurity and inevitability", which the company's Vasily Kashnikov called "the two greatest fears". Dybowski remarked that Ice-Pick had to remake "the game twice from scratch" before it managed to strike the right tone.

Knock-Knock was funded through a successful Kickstarter campaign.

== Reception ==
Reception

Aggregate score
Aggregator	Score
Metacritic	(XOne) 70/100 (Vita) 67/100 (iOS) 63/100 (PC) 57/100 (PS4) 51/100

Review scores
Publication	Score
Game Informer	(PC) 5/10
GameSpot	(PC) 4/10
Gamezebo	(PC) 3.5/5
GameZone	(PC) 5.5/10
IGN	(PC) 6.2/10
MacLife	(iOS) 2.5/5
PC PowerPlay	(PC) 7/10
Pocket Gamer	(iOS) 2.5/5
Push Square	(PS4) 6/10
TouchArcade	(iOS) 3/5

The game received "mixed or average reviews" on all platforms according to the review aggregation site Metacritic.
