= Mr. Shifty =

2017 video game

- Developer: Team Shifty
- Publisher: tinyBuild
- Composer: Ack Kinmonth
- Engine: Unity
- Platforms: Linux, Microsoft Windows, macOS, Nintendo Switch, PlayStation 4, Xbox One
- Release: Microsoft Windows, MacOS, Linux, Nintendo Switch: WW: 13 April 2017; PlayStation 4: WW: 11 July 2017; Xbox One: WW: 4 August 2017
- Genre: Beat 'em up
- Mode: Single-player

Mr. Shifty is a 2.5D beat 'em up video game developed by Team Shifty and published by tinyBuild.

== Gameplay ==
Mr. Shifty is experienced from a top-down perspective. The player assumes the role of a thief, Mr. Shifty, who is attempting to steal a plutonium core from a building secured by many enemy guards. Shifty advances through a linear series of rooms to reach the end of the stage, which is an elevator on all but the last stage. He must either defeat all the enemies in a room to unlock the door to the next, or travel to its exit while avoiding all its hazards.

Shifty's signature ability is "shifting", which teleports him a few meters and lets him pass through thin walls or dodge bullets. Shifting is limited: one shift regenerates for every second the player does not shift, but if the meter is depleted by shifting five times without allowing a recharge, the player cannot shift for five seconds. Some rooms have "shift blockers" that cannot be shifted into or out of. The player can punch to kill enemies in two or three hits, depending on the enemy. Scattered around levels are various melee weapons and items which kill enemies in one hit; these items may be held or thrown, and break after a few uses (except for certain throwable items).

Enemies carry many different weapons, including shotguns, flamethrowers, and rocket launchers. Any hit from a weapon — or from an environmental hazard such as lasers, mines, or turrets — will kill Shifty and send him to the beginning of the room to try again.

Killing enemies adds to a meter at the bottom of the player's screen, which begins to drain after not killing an enemy for a short time. When this meter is full, the next bullet that comes close to Shifty will activate "Slow-Mo". During Slow-Mo, shift recharges almost instantly and time is slowed down for all enemies.

== Plot ==
Silent protagonist Mr. Shifty, in radio contact with his superior Nyx, breaches Olympus Tower, the offices of StoneCorp. They aim to steal a dangerous weapon called the "mega-plutonium", to prevent its use for nefarious purposes by the evil Chairman Stone. Shifty infiltrates the building's lower floors and locates the mega-plutonium, but it is a decoy and a bomb. Nyx and Shifty, undaunted, decide to continue by killing Stone, who contacts Shifty by radio. Stone is impressed by Shift's abilities and offers him a job, but Shifty ignores him. At the end of the chapter, Stone sedates Shifty with noxious gas in the elevator, saying Shifty should have accepted his offer.

Shifty awakes deep underground in a cell filled with a shift blocker, but punches through the wall to freedom. He fights his way to a computer terminal, where he re-establishes radio contact with Nyx, who guides him to the surface. There, he encounters Stone, who seems to die in a large explosion.

Nyx at first intends to extract Shifty, but they encounter Stone again soon after. Nyx, shocked, orders Shifty to kill him, but Stone disappears. He reveals that he has studied Shifty and used the real mega-plutonium as a power source for a machine that can teleport anything everywhere. Shifty battles through the many obstacles and guards that Stone shifts in his way, finally destroying the machine's core. This causes it to go haywire, shifting objects randomly, before it explodes and dies. Shifty enters Stone's office at the top of the tower, dodges the hail of gunfire from Stone's twin tommy guns, and kills him.

== Development and release ==
Mr. Shifty was developed by Team Shifty and published by tinyBuild. The game was released for Nintendo Switch, Windows, macOS, and Linux on 13 April 2017. PlayStation 4 and Xbox One versions were released a few months later, on 11 July and 4 August respectively.

== Reception ==
Mr. Shifty has a score of 66% on Metacritic.

GameSpot awarded Mr. Shifty has a score of 8.0 out of 10, saying it offered "an exciting, intense experience, and it's easy to forgive the game's performance flaws". Destructoid awarded it a score of 6 out of 10, saying "while the combat may have some depth and the game is certainly tongue-in-cheek, it just doesn't present enough new ideas to sustain itself." Game Informer awarded it a score of 5 out of 10, saying "It just made me tired and disappointed to see such a neat premise amount to nothing more than a chore." Pocket Gamer awarded it a score of 7 out of 10, saying "Mr. Shifty is a fun, twitchy action game that fails to capitalise on what was so good about its primary influence."
