= The Final Station =

2016 video game

- Promotional image for the game, depicting the main character.
- Developer: Do My Best Games (Note: Nvidia Lightspeed Studios developed the Nvidia Shield version.)
- Publisher: tinyBuild
- Producer: Alex Nichporchik
- Designer: Oleg Sergeev
- Programmer: Andrew Rumak
- Artist: Oleg Sergeev
- Engine: Unity
- Platforms: OS X; Windows; PlayStation 4; Xbox One; Nintendo Switch; Linux
- Release: August 30, 2016: OS X, Windows; August 30, 2016; PlayStation 4; NA: August 30, 2016; PAL: September 6, 2016; Xbox One; September 2, 2016; Nintendo Switch; NA: February 23, 2018; EU: February 27, 2018 Linux; November 24, 2016
- Genre: Shooter
- Mode: Single-player

The Final Station is a side-scrolling shooter video game with a train simulator and exploration elements. It was developed by Do My Best Games and published by tinyBuild, and released on August 30, 2016 for Windows, OS X, Linux, and Xbox One, and September 2, 2016 for PlayStation 4.

The game received mixed to positive reviews from critics, who praised its originality and world-building but criticized its linearity. DLC titled The Only Traitor was released on April 19, 2017, featuring a new main character and taking place concurrently with the events of the main story.

== Gameplay ==
The Final Station consists of two types of gameplay. The first takes place inside the train, where the player must balance taking care of survivors that they have rescued by feeding them or healing them and taking care of the train by completing small minigames to keep the experimental train running until they reach the next train station. The second takes place at the various train stations. In these sections, the player explores a side-scrolling level with an apocalyptic theme, where they face various types of enemies and gather supplies such as ammunition, food, and survivors. To complete a level, the player must find a hidden code to make the train move again, and then go back to the train. When facing enemies, the player must decide on what resources to use and what risks to take. They might engage in melee combat, shoot an enemy and use their small amount of ammunition, use the environment to deal with enemies or try to run past and avoid the enemies.

== Plot ==
The player takes the role of a conductor named Edward Jones, who is working as a train operator 106 years after a catastrophe dubbed "The First Visitation". One day, Jones is tasked with taking an experimental train to pick up special cargo. However, during the journey, Jones quickly discovers that he is in the midst of "The Second Visitation", as cities and towns are attacked by an unknown force, and their inhabitants are transformed into aggressive monsters by an unknown infection. Eventually, Jones picks up the power source and central processor for the Guardian, a massive war machine being built to protect humanity from the Second Visitation. Jones eventually reaches the city of Metropole where the Guardian is being built and delivers the cargo.

On the way home, Jones picks up a mysterious stranger named Arthur Vane who rides with him and speaks with him in cryptic clues. Vane reveals to Jones that the infection that is transforming people into monsters is not a virus, but a medicine that was meant to make people stronger, and that the radiation the train's engine is generating is protecting Jones from its effects. Shortly after, the train breaks down, forcing Jones to make the rest of the journey on foot. Along the way, he passes the destroyed wreck of the Guardian and is accidentally exposed to poison gas. When he finally reaches his hometown, he discovers that the people who are apparently immune to the infection are already rebuilding society, but he himself is showing symptoms of infection. Jones manages to reach his home but succumbs to the infection before he can see his daughter. Vane then arrives and promises to look after Jones' daughter before mercifully killing him.

=== The Only Traitor ===
The player takes the role of a doomsday prepper named Peter who aims to reach a shelter when The Second Visitation hits. He escapes his apartment in a car and begins traveling cross country to reach the shelter, stopping at towns along the way to scavenge supplies. However, since the car can only carry one passenger, Peter must make decisions on which survivors he should bring with him and which to leave behind. Along the way, Peter can discover documents and overhear conversations revealing a faction of the government led by Arthur Vane had been secretly sabotaging humanity's efforts to combat the Visitations under the belief that the gas that is turning people into monsters is actually meant to help them, since a small fraction of those afflicted retain their minds and gain superhuman abilities.

Peter eventually reaches the shelter, but is dismayed to discover that it has already been sealed shut. Peter continues on in hopes of finding another shelter at the city of Ristol. However, the Ristol shelter has also already been sealed shut. With no other choice, Peter decides to travel further west to the remote L-abs shelter. However, on the way there, Peter is caught in a car crash and forced to proceed on foot. He sneaks his way through a bandit camp where the bandits have been capturing and rounding up survivors. When he is discovered, Arthur Vane appears and helps him escape, but Peter ends up transported to a surreal landscape that defies the laws of space and time. Eventually, Peter encounters Vane again, and Vane offers him a place in the L-abs shelter, but Peter must murder Edward Jones first. Vane then leaves Peter to be rescued by Jones, who offers him a seat on his train.

== Development ==
The Final Station was in development for 2.5 years before being released as a full game in 2016, and was Do My Best Games's first release. TinyBuild is the publisher/co-developer. TinyBuild morphed part of their studio to port third-party indie projects to consoles alongside their development. This way, they could concentrate on a single large release. Do My Best Games started with a small prototype, which was produced relatively quickly. However, a couple of very important mechanics were missing from this prototype. Because of this, they had to make a lot of changes. The next step was the creation of a demo which featured all the mechanics. This version of the game was given to press and publishers. After this step, they started to build the game levels and other content.

== Reception ==
The Final Station received "generally favorable" reviews from critics, with an aggregate score of 76/100 on Metacritic for the PC version. Stephen Turner of Destructoid rated the game 80/100, calling it a "contemplative slice of sci-fi horror" and comparing it to Snowpiercer and Evangelion. Alex Gilyadov of GameSpot rated the game 7/10, saying it had a "fast-paced mix of action and strategy" with a "compelling twist", but criticized it for being "predictable" with "lackluster dialogue". Graham Smith of Rock, Paper, Shotgun called the game "simple, but just compelling enough".
