= Cargo! The Quest for Gravity =

2011 video game

- Developer: Ice-Pick Lodge
- Publishers: bitComposer Interactive, Viva Media
- Platform: Microsoft Windows (Steam)
- Release: April 21, 2011
- Genre: Action-adventure
- Mode: Single-player

Cargo! The Quest for Gravity (Russian: Эврика!) is an action-adventure game developed by Ice-Pick Lodge and published by bitComposer Interactive, and Viva Media for Microsoft Windows in 2011.

== Reception ==
Reception

Aggregate score
Aggregator	Score
Metacritic	64/100

Review scores
Publication	Score
Destructoid	7/10
Eurogamer	8/10
Gamekult	5/10
GameSpot	5.5/10
GameStar	64%
Gamezebo	3.5/5
IGN	5.5/10
PC Gamer (UK)	67%
PC PowerPlay	4/10

The game received "mixed" reviews according to the review aggregation website Metacritic.
