= Ice-Pick Lodge =

Video-game development studio based in Kazakhstan

- Type: Private
- Industry: Video games
- Founded: 2002; 24 years ago
- Founders: Nikolay Dybowski, Ayrat Zakirov, Petr Potapov
- Headquarters: Almaty, Kazakhstan
- Number of employees: 30 (2025)
- Website: ice-pick.com

Ice-Pick Lodge is a video game developer based in Almaty, founded in 2002 by Nikolay Dybowski and Ayrat Zakirov. Originally founded in Russia, the company is known for its unconventional approach to game design, questioning the concept of fun in video games and emphasizing shock, ambiguity, and discomfort. In 2002, Ice-Pick Lodge laid out their core artistic principles in the Deep Game Manifesto. The studio's first game, which became the practical embodiment of the manifesto, was Pathologic. The studio also released games such as The Void, Cargo! The Quest for Gravity, Knock-Knock, Pathologic 2, Know by Heart and Franz.

== History ==
Ice-Pick Lodge was founded in 2002 by Nikolay Dybowski, who took on the role of creative director, and Ayrat Zakirov, who was responsible for staffing and technical expertise. Later, Petr Potapov joined the studio as technical art director.

From the beginning, the studio was conceived not as a traditional game company but as a creative laboratory.

The studio used crowdfunding for two of its projects, Knock-Knock and Pathologic 2, with both campaigns successfully reaching their goals.

In March 2025, the studio announced that Nikolay Dybowski had left Ice-Pick Lodge to pursue personal projects. Petr Potapov and Ayrat Zakirov stayed on in their roles as team leads.

In November 2025, Ice-Pick Lodge revealed the development of Darkwood 2, in collaboration with Hooded Horse, which became the project's publisher. This marks the studio's first title based on an external franchise.

== Games ==
Year	Title	Publisher	Platforms
2005	Pathologic	G2 Games	Windows
2008	The Void	Self-published	Windows
2011	Cargo! The Quest for Gravity	bitComposer Interactive / Viva Media	Windows
2013	Knock-Knock	Self-published	Windows, PlayStation 4, PlayStation Vita, Xbox One, iOS, Android
2015	Pathologic Classic HD	Good Shepherd Entertainment	Windows
2019	Pathologic 2	tinyBuild	Windows, PlayStation 4, Xbox One
2022	Know by Heart	Self-published	Windows, PlayStation 4, Xbox One, Nintendo Switch, iOS, Android
2023	Franz	Self-published	iOS, Android
2026	Pathologic 3	HypeTrain Digital	Windows, PlayStation 5, Xbox Series X/S

== Upcoming ==
Year	Title	Publisher	Platforms
TBA	Darkwood 2	Hooded Horse	Windows, Xbox Series X/S
