= Fearless Fantasy =

2014 video game

- Developer: Enter Skies
- Publisher: tinyBuild
- Platforms: Microsoft Windows; iOS; Android
- Release: Microsoft Windows; May 15, 2014; iOS; May 14, 2015; Android; June 4, 2015
- Genre: Role-playing
- Mode: Single-player

Fearless Fantasy is a 2014 parody role-playing video game developed by Enter Skies and published by tinyBuild for Microsoft Windows, iOS, and Android. The game follows Leon, a bounty hunter tasked with rescuing a person from the king's guard.

== Gameplay ==
Gameplay screenshot.

The game puts the players in a charge of leading a party of three: a knight, a hammer wielder, and a healer. The trio work their way through a series of battles, interrupted by animated cutscenes and places to purchase certain equipment. There are no exploration elements throughout the story. While Fearless Fantasy is a turn-based role-playing video game, its combat is based on the gestures.

In each turn, the players are able to choose a type of attack and have to properly create a successful combination of prompts to launch it. All party members and enemies have an "Active Time Battle" meter alongside their hit points and energy bars which will determine the order of their turns. Imagined as a parody, it often inserts jokes during the gameplay (swords are doubled up as laser rifles, matryoshka monsters, a troll move that attracts attention of the enemies by dancing, and others).

== Reception ==
Upon its release, Fearless Fantasy was met with "generally favourable" reviews from critics for the iOS version, with an aggregate score of 84%.
