= Diaries of a Spaceport Janitor =

2016 video game

- Developer: Sundae Month
- Publisher: tinyBuild
- Programmer: Isobel Shasha
- Writer: Bradford Horton
- Platforms: macOS, Microsoft Windows
- Release: September 16, 2016
- Genre: Adventure
- Mode: Single-player

Diaries of a Spaceport Janitor is an anti-adventure video game developed by Sundae Month and published by tinyBuild. The game released on Steam on September 16, 2016.

== Gameplay ==
The player-controlled character is a janitor in a sci-fi themed bazaar. The player character must pick up and incinerate trash.

== Development and plot ==
Diaries of a Spaceport Janitor was created in light of the Gamergate controversy, where female video game developer Zoe Quinn was repeatedly harassed for non-conventional projects. Developer Isobel Shasha said:

"Obviously, [harassment] wasn't new. We all knew it was happening. We were feeling pretty disenchanted with certain aspects of the community. I think it's impossible at some level to separate certain cultural things about game spaces from games themselves. We had a lot of conversations about what player expectations are, and how we can either subvert, play with, or outright fuck with their expectations,"

The player's role as a janitor that never escapes their original routine, the regular abuses of power by the game's police force, and interactions with non-player characters are all intended as metaphors for capitalism.

In addition, the game contains themes of transgender experience and of mental health. The skull that follows the player immediately after finishing the introduction is a metaphor for depression as well as whatever the player's personal experience with mental illness be. In order to avoid the player's field of view from going hazy, they must regularly purchase "gender" – a metaphor for dysphoria.

== Reception ==
Reception

Aggregate score
Aggregator	Score
Metacritic	69/100

The game's themes and narrative were praised for being "a reverse-power fantasy"; even being compared to Papers, Please and Cart Life, if only "with a happier aesthetic". The game has a Metacritic score of 69. Its "gender" mechanic allowed itself to be placed in the "Queer Games Bundle" on Steam.
