= Pathologic =

2005 video game

- Developer: Ice-Pick Lodge
- Publishers: RU: Buka Entertainment; UK: G2 Games GMX Games
- Director: Nikolai Dybowski
- Artists: Eli Goren; Ilya Kalinin; Evgeniya Dashina
- Platform: Microsoft Windows
- Release: RU: June 9, 2005; UK: August 18, 2006; Classic HD: WW: October 29, 2015
- Genres: Survival, role-playing
- Mode: Single-player

Pathologic (Russian: Мор. Утопия, romanized: Mor. Utopiya, IPA: [ˈmor ʊˈtopʲɪjə], lit. 'More. Utopia' – a pun on Thomas More's Utopia and the Russian word for "plague, pestilence" (мор)) is a 2005 survival game developed by Russian studio Ice-Pick Lodge. The game was released in Russia by Buka Entertainment in June 2005, followed by a localised English release from G2 Games and GMX Games in 2006. An updated version, Pathologic Classic HD, was developed by General Arcade, published by Good Shepard Entertainment, and released in October 2015. A remake of the Haruspex route was developed by Ice-Pick Lodge in the Unity game engine and released as Pathologic 2 in May 2019 by tinyBuild. A second remake reimagining the Bachelor route, Pathologic 3, was released on 9 January 2026 by HypeTrain Digital.

== Gameplay ==
A district in the Steppe

The player can select one of the three playable healers listed by their honorifics: The Bachelor (Daniil Dankovsky), Haruspex (Artemy Burakh), and The Devotress, Klara (later re-translated as "The Changeling, Clara"). Only the former two may be played at the beginning of Pathologic, as Clara must be unlocked after completing the game with either the Bachelor or Haruspex. The questlines which are available will depend on the character that is being played. The other unselected characters are present in the town throughout each others' storylines, who at certain points in gameplay the player may encounter.

Each character has a different Mission detailed in their quest book, however, the game's objective is to survive the twelve playable days. Pathologic takes place in a perpetual world over a timeframe of twelve in-game days. Throughout each day, the player receives quests from non-player characters (NPCs); however, the game continues regardless of whether they are completed or not. At exactly midnight of each day, the quests are erased from the player's notebook. Quests are divided into main missions (one per day), which decide if a major character (referred to in-game as the "Bound") will die, and side quests, which allow the player to earn money and items. Completing main quests is essential to uncovering the secrets of the town, as characters who would otherwise reveal information later in the game can fall ill from the plague early.

== Plot ==
Regardless of the player's choice in player character, each of the three healers tries to uncover the source of a strange lethal sickness known as the "sand plague" that has befallen a small, remote town. Although players can play as each of them, there is only one base storyline, which is seen from the three different points of views of the chosen player character. Minor plot details will change depending on the player, and the ability to uncover some secrets depends on which character is being played. The player may also interact with the other two unchosen characters and discuss their progress throughout the game.

The game's fluctuating economy represents the harsh forces of supply and demand in an isolated, disease-ridden town. All districts and major buildings of the town are named after body parts and biology. On the edge of town, there is a great building named the Polyhedron, a physically impossible structure used as a fortress by children. On the opposite side lies an ominous cattle-slaughtering Abattoir, with a dormitory known as the Apiary (later re-translated as "Termitary") next to it.

Each character has an assigned group of NPCs - their "Bound" - which they are tasked with keeping safe by completing the main quest every day.

There are four endings available. Each playable character has a designated ending, although any of these three endings may be chosen if the player completes the optional task of keeping the other healer's Bound healthy by the meeting time on the 12th day. The Bachelor's ending allows the town to be destroyed, saving the miraculous Polyhedron. The Haruspex's ending destroys the Polyhedron to allow the production of a panacea, saving the town. The Devotress/Changeling's ending allows both the Polyhedron and the town to coexist, at the cost of sacrificing some of the townspeople. If the player is unable to keep all of their Bound safe, however, the town becomes overrun by pestilence in the fourth "Bad Ending".

== Development and release ==
Pathologic was the first game developed by Russian studio Ice-Pick Lodge. The game was announced by Russian publisher Buka Entertainment on 30 March 2004, intending to release in the last quarter of the year. The native Russian version of the game was released to manufacturing on 31 May 2005, for release on 9 June. The English-localised version was completed on 20 November 2005 and released by G2 Games in 2006. A German version was published by Frogster Interactive Pictures on 20 April 2006 after being released to manufacturing earlier that month.

== Reception ==
Reception

Aggregate score
Aggregator	Score
GameRankings	66%

Review scores
Publication	Score
Eurogamer	6/10
GamesTM	8/10
PC Gamer (UK)	52/100
Absolute Games	85%

In Russia, Pathologic was critically acclaimed, winning year-end accolades from five Russian outlets. However, its reception in English-speaking countries has been mixed, being both praised for its atmosphere and concept, while panned for its poor translation, outdated graphics and slow-paced gameplay.

== Remaster and remake ==
In November 2013, Ice-Pick Lodge publicised their intentions to remake Pathologic, using crowdfunding to finance its development. They later confirmed the remake's development in July 2014 and launched a Kickstarter crowdfunding campaign that September, sought to raise US$250,000. The Kickstarter reached the goal by the end of the month, and ended in a total of $333,127, backed by 7,139 people.

In October 2015, Ice-Pick Lodge announced Pathologic Classic HD, a remaster of the original Pathologic developed by General Arcade and published by Gambitious Digital Entertainment. This remaster introduced upgraded visuals, fixed bugs, re-recorded dialog, and a re-translated English script. Pathologic Classic HD was released on 29 October 2015. The remaster received generally favourable reviews according to Metacritic.

Under publisher tinyBuild, the Pathologic remake was retitled Pathologic 2 to be distinguished from Pathologic Classic HD. Pathologic 2 was released on 23 May 2019. In October 2024, it was announced that the Bachelor route would instead be dramatically reimagined and released as a standalone sequel, Pathologic 3. Published by HypeTrain Digital, it was released on 9 January 2026. All Kickstarter backers received Pathologic 3 at no extra charge.
