= No Time to Explain =

2011 video game

- Developer: tinyBuild
- Publisher: tinyBuild
- Designers: Tom Brien; Alex Nichiporchik
- Composer: Edgar Plotnieks
- Engine: Adobe Flash (Legacy) Unity (Remastered)
- Platforms: Linux; Microsoft Windows; OS X; Xbox One; PlayStation 4
- Release: Windows, OS X, Linux: WW: August 15, 2011; Remastered:Windows, OS X, Linux: WW: July 17, 2015; Xbox One: WW: July 17, 2015; PlayStation 4: WW: March 29, 2016
- Genre: Platform
- Mode: Single-player

No Time to Explain is a platform game developed and published by tinyBuild. Designed by Tom Brien and Alex Nichiporchik, it is the successor to Brien's browser game, released on January 6, 2011. No Time to Explain has been released on Linux, Microsoft Windows, and OS X. A remastered version of the game, No Time to Explain Remastered, was released for Linux, Microsoft Windows, OS X, PlayStation 4, and Xbox One. A Wii U version was planned, but never released.

== Plot ==
The game follows an unnamed male protagonist. He is dancing next to his television at home, when his wall is destroyed by someone who declares "I am you from the future", only to get immediately captured by a giant alien crab claw. The protagonist grabs his weapon, a laser cannon that works similarly to a jetpack, and chases him through time, in search of answers.

After overcoming multiple obstacles, the player meets the giant crab again. The creature is transported into a UFO and the battle starts.

The plot contains elements of time travel, the time paradox effect, and alternate timelines. As the game continues, the characters and worlds get increasingly more absurd, including a world made entirely of desserts and a blank world that must be painted with "ink" (via the gun) to traverse. The player will also control several alternate versions of the protagonists, such as the football helmet wearing "Most Popular Guy in the World," who uses his shotgun to propel himself over large distances.

Eventually, the culprit behind the attacks is discovered: the protagonist's evil twin, who was released by accident while the protagonist was chasing his abducted selves. Once all the levels are completed, a round table of protagonists convenes to come up with a plan. The group misunderstands a brainstorm from the original protagonist and grafts him and The Most Popular Guy in the World together into a composite being, giving the player the ability to use both types of guns. The plan somehow works, but moments before defeat, the evil twin goes back to the beginning of the game with Composite Guy in pursuit. The original protagonist is killed after the twin steals the laser gun, and the twin is then pushed into the attacking monster he released.

== Gameplay ==
The game is a 2D side-scroller, with most of the levels involving various means of propulsion. The main method is a laser gun worn as a jetpack that shoots a laser beam with a time limit. Many variations on this, such as a shotgun that launches the player at a great distance, or a slingshot effect that flings the player from wall to wall, are used at different levels.

== Development ==
No Time to Explain is a browser game created by Tom Brien and released on Newgrounds on January 6, 2011. After the success of No Time to Explain, Brien teamed up with Alex Nichiporchik to start work on a full version of the game.

Development on No Time to Explain began in February 2011. The game was initially announced for PC and Mac, and was released for Windows, Mac and Linux in August 2011, and on Steam in January 2013. The game differs from the original Flash game as the level design is not hand drawn but made out of digital textures. On April 11, 2011, tinyBuild announced that they opened a Kickstarter account to collect funds to help support the project. In less than 24 hours, the $7,000 goal was met. The Kickstarter page helped raise over $26,000 for the project with a notable contribution of $2,000 from Minecraft creator Markus Persson.

== Reception ==
Jordan Devore, from Destructoid, described the game as unfairly hard, stating "I wager at least half of my deaths stemmed from issues with the controls". He was especially critical of the bugs, mentioning the intense frustration caused by them. He was positive, however, about the abundance of checkpoints, as well as the variety of weapons and the boss battles.
