= SpeedRunners =

2013 video game

- Developer: DoubleDutch Games
- Publisher: tinyBuild
- Producer: Alex Nichiporchik
- Designer: Casper van Est
- Programmer: Gert-Jan Stolk
- Artist: Tom Brien
- Composer: SonicPicnic
- Engine: Microsoft XNA
- Platforms: Microsoft Windows; Nintendo Switch; OS X; Linux; Xbox One; PlayStation 4; iOS
- Release: Windows, OS X, Linux; 19 April 2016; Xbox One; 1 June 2017; PlayStation 4; 5 July 2017; Nintendo Switch; 23 January 2020
- Genre: Platform
- Modes: Single-player, multiplayer

SpeedRunners is a multiplayer side-scrolling racing game developed by DoubleDutch Games and published by tinyBuild. Originally a free web browser game titled SpeedRunner and later an Xbox 360 game by the name SpeedRunner HD on Xbox Live Arcade, SpeedRunners was released on Steam on 26 August 2013 into Steam Early Access, and as a full game on 19 April 2016. SpeedRunners was released on Xbox One in June 2017 as a Games with Gold title. A Nintendo Switch version was released on 23 January 2020. It was recognized as an esport by the Electronic Sports League in July 2015. However, due to decreasing activity the SpeedRunners section was ended on 28 August 2016 when the final community cup was held.

A sequel, developed by Fair Play Labs and titled SpeedRunners 2: King of Speed, was announced to release in 2025 and 2026 for PC and consoles respectively. The sequel would then be delayed to July 2026, and delayed again to September 3, 2026.

== Gameplay ==
Screenshot of gameplay

SpeedRunners is played as a fast-paced side-scroller. Players compete with each other to outrun their opponents by using grappling hooks, power-ups, items, and interactive environments. The screen moves with whoever is currently in the lead. Falling behind far enough off the screen results in being eliminated. After a player is eliminated, the screen will start to get smaller, making it harder to stay alive. If no one gets eliminated in a set time, the screen will automatically start to get smaller.

When all but one player is eliminated, the last player standing wins the round. The shrunken screen is restored to its original size, and another round starts after a countdown. A player must win 3 rounds to win the match altogether.

Players are able to pick Trails (which show when a player is Sprinting) and a Character. Additionally, most Characters come with 4 different Skins, which change their color. Players can also form teams of 2 players before starting a match. Teams need to win 4 rounds instead of 3, and players in teams also share their Sprinting Meter.

As the player progresses they earn experience based on their performance. Getting enough experience points causes the player to level up which unlocks new power-ups, levels, characters, and skins. While most skins in the game are purely cosmetic, there is one mystery skin that hinders the players ability to play by giving them disadvantages in power ups and speed debuffs.

== Reception ==
Reception

Aggregate score
Aggregator	Score
Metacritic	(PC) 84/100 (NS) 71/100

Review scores
Publication	Score
Nintendo Life	8/10
Nintendo World Report	5.5/10

Kotaku's Alex Jones termed SpeedRunners as "competitive multiplayer Mario that Nintendo should've made". PC Gamer's Emanuel Maiberg said it to be a "fully realized idea", with the exception of "occasional bug and some rough art assets". Rock, Paper, Shotgun's Ben Barrett praised the game's simplicity.

SpeedRunners won the Gamer's Voice Award in the 2015 SXSW Gaming Award, the 2014 Best Multiplayer Game Award by Indie DB, and was nominated for Best PC/Console Game at the 2012 Dutch Game Awards.

The game received criticism from Brett Posner-Ferdman who reviewed the game on Nintendo Switch for Nintendo World Report, who criticised the game for lacking story mode, having little content outside multiplayer and for locking content behind DLC.

== Sequel ==
On April 10, 2025, it was announced that a sequel developed by Fair Play Labs, titled SpeedRunners 2: King of Speed, was set to release in 2026 for PC and consoles. While the sequel is developed by Fair Play Labs, DoubleDutch Games is involved by providing advice and feedback. The sequel is currently set to release with cross-play on PC, PlayStation 5, Xbox Series X|S, and Nintendo Switch on September 3, 2026.
