= Despot's Game =

2022 video game

Despot's Game: Dystopian Battle Simulator
- Developer: Konfa Games
- Publisher: tinyBuild
- Platform: Linux; macOS; Microsoft Windows
- Release: September 29, 2022
- Genres: Roguelike, Auto-battler
- Mode: Multiplayer; single-player

Despot's Game: Dystopian Battle Simulator is a tactical roguelike videogame released in 2022. The title was developed by Konfa Games and published by tinyBuild.

== Gameplay ==
In Despot's Game, players must build an army using available options to survive procedurally generated labyrinths. Players must balance their team with different units (DPS, tanks, debuffs, buffers, healers, and magic casters) to have a better chance of survival.

Players can recruit up to 49 units in their party and equip them with a selection of weaponry. Players can buy new units and weapons from shops, with better weapons becoming available as they progress. Party management also involves a food meter, which is determined by the size of a player's army. Units become less effective when they are hungry.

== Development ==
Despot's Game is the second title in Russian studio Konfa's "Despot" series. The game follows Despotism 3k, released for PC in 2018. A third title in the series, Slime 3K: Rise Against Despot, had a full release on October 31, 2024.

In 2022, publisher tinyBuild acquired Konfa Games during the development of Despot's Game. It was reportedly purchased for a maximum consideration of $5.4 million in cash and newly issued shares.

A 2025 interview with developer Nikolai Kuznetsov revealed that a new game in the Despot series was under development. Balatro was listed as an inspiration, with ways to change the gameplay between runs but not with permanent upgrades.

== Reception ==
Reception

Aggregate scores
Aggregator	Score
Metacritic	(PC) 73/100
OpenCritic	55% recommend

Despot's Game received "mixed or average" reviews according to the review aggregation website Metacritic. Fellow review aggregator OpenCritic assessed that the game received fair approval, being recommended by 55% of critics.

In a mixed review, Xbox Era criticized the game's difficulty. However, they gave compliments to the game's design, music, and certain gameplay depth/mechanics.
