= Pathologic 2 =

- Developer: Ice-Pick Lodge
- Publisher: tinyBuild
- Director: Nikolay Dybowski
- Producers: Alex Nichiporchik; Ivan Slovtsov
- Designer: Ivan Slovtsov
- Artists: Meethos; Anna Orlova; Elena Alt; Peter Potapov; Pavel Panfilov
- Writers: Nikolay Dybowski; Alexandra Golubeva
- Composers: Vasily Kashnikov; Theodor Bastard
- Engine: Unity
- Platforms: Microsoft Windows; PlayStation 4; Xbox One
- Release: Windows, Xbox One; 23 May 2019; PlayStation 4; 6 March 2020
- Genre: Role-playing
- Mode: Single-player

Pathologic 2 (Russian: Мор, romanized: Mor, lit. 'Pestilence') is a 2019 horror-themed role-playing game developed by Ice-Pick Lodge and published by tinyBuild. Pathologic 2 was originally conceived of as a remake of the developer's earlier 2005 video game Pathologic, but during development grew to encompass a much greater scope. The game has variously been described as a remake, a reboot and a remaster, and draws elements from all three. Three storylines had been planned for the game, mirroring the stories of the Bachelor, Haruspex and Changeling from the original Pathologic.

The game was released with the story of the Haruspex on 23 May 2019. On 7 October 2024, it was announced that the Bachelor's route would instead be released as a standalone sequel, Pathologic 3, with a dramatically different gameplay and scope. The game released on 9 January 2026.

A playable demo (released on 2 December 2016) called The Marble Nest with its own short story is freely available on the internet, as well as an alpha build which was released on 11 September 2018. Another playable demo was released on 24 April 2019, one month prior to the game's release. An updated version of The Marble Nest was released on Steam as DLC content on 28 October 2019. It was available for free to players who had owned the base game before this date.

== Gameplay ==
=== Overview ===
Gameplay in Pathologic 2 takes place primarily in the Town on the Gorkhon River, with occasional diversions for tutorial sequences and other one-off events. The town is divided into a number of districts named after various body parts, such as "The Gut" or "The Hindquarters", which may become infected or abandoned throughout the game as a result of the plague. The player's actions often directly affect which districts become infected with the plague and which remain healthy, and travelling through infected districts (which the player must do for some objectives or to scavenge supplies) greatly raises the player's own infection risk.

Pathologic 2 takes place over day cycles, consisting of a day and a short night. During the day, most things will be available for the player to pursue and townsfolk will take part in their daily activities (as long as the district is not infected); shops will be open, children will be playing in parks and on streets and citizens will move around the city. After midnight, the night phase begins. Many events that could have occurred during the previous day will be locked off, either until the next day or sometimes permanently. During the night, many shops are closed, there are very few citizens other than night watchmen roaming the town, and the player may be attacked by roaming bandits, who may also rob any citizens caught unaware. Each night, a play is rehearsed at the theater in the center of the town. These short plays consist of bizarre and surreal scenes that cryptically predict future events. After the play is performed, the Dead Item Shop opens at a random location in the town, which allows the player to exchange normally useless "dead" items (such as wrappers, broken bottles or used bandages) for various, sometimes very rare, goods.

The player barters for an ampoule of morphine from a town patrolman. In exchange, they offer a well-maintained lockpick, the only item the patrolman wants, which he considers more valuable.

The player is able to obtain items in three primary ways; they can be purchased from shops or merchants, bartered for with townsfolk, or found in containers in the game world. Shops will often be the player's only source for very rare items such as high quality food, antibiotics or surgical equipment, but such items will usually come at an extremely steep monetary cost. Many items can be bartered for, which will allow the player to offload mostly useless items (such as candles, soap or religious charms) for useful ones. Each item in a barter has a barter value, which represents how much the person values said item, and the value of the offer against the request must be zero or positive to be accepted. The identity of a person determines what items they will be willing to barter and what items they will be interested in from the player's inventory. Workers, for example, will usually prioritize items like chisels or grindstones from the player, and be willing to give up metal scrap or tools that the player can use to repair their items. Finding items in containers is a way to acquire items without any material penalty, but comes with its own downsides. Trash cans will often have items in them, but they are rarely useful. Better items can be found inside houses, but getting to them requires either committing burglary and possibly becoming hated by the community, or breaking into an abandoned home that has been infected with the plague. The player can also acquire organs by performing an autopsy on a body, provided they possess a scalpel. Organs sell for very high prices and can be sometimes useful, but the process involved in obtaining them is frowned upon by the town, causing the player to lose their trust if it is done too many times.

The player's activities are guided by the "thought map," which displays the thoughts and events of the main character in a chart that can be accessed at any time. These thoughts often point to locations on the map where the player can go to advance a certain plot thread or learn new information. When a thought thread has reached a conclusion, the connections will terminate in a thought with a yellow icon which summarizes the results of the endeavor. Pathologic 2 is designed specifically so that, especially on later days, the player does not have the ability to investigate every curiosity or thought in a single day and will often be forced to choose what they consider more important, with the knowledge that they may lose the chance to investigate certain things once the day ends.

=== Player character ===
The player must manage a variety of needs in order to stay alive, including hunger, thirst, exhaustion, health, immunity from the plague and their reputation with the areas of the town. Hunger can be sated with food, which becomes significantly more expensive and rare the longer time progresses due to the plague and an absence of supplies from the train network. Thirst can be sated with water, which is plentiful during the early game but gradually becomes infected once districts are taken by the plague. The player's thirst also acts as their stamina, which is consumed while running, jumping, attacking or performing other strenuous activities. The more thirsty the player is, the less maximum stamina they have available. Exhaustion can be cured by sleeping or by eating coffee beans, which can be dangerous if done too many times, forcing the player to sleep at least occasionally. During sleep, the player may experience a dream sequence, which reinforces events that have happened previously and may foreshadow future events. Overall health will begin to drop when any of these needs are not adequately met, in addition to dropping when the player is attacked or takes another form of direct damage, such as falling or the plague. Immunity from the plague drops gradually while the player is in an infected area, and must be maintained by staying out of infected areas (where it recovers a moderate amount naturally) and using medicine, like immunity pills or herbal tinctures. If the player's immunity drops to zero, they become infected with the plague and must consistently treat themselves with antibiotics to avoid dying until a cure is found.

The player's reputation is per town district, and will improve or degrade based on many different actions. Doing good deeds such as treating the sick and helping people will usually increase the player's reputation within the area, as will giving a more valuable item for a less valuable item in a barter. Performing any frowned upon action will diminish the player's reputation in the area. Criminal actions like robbery, burglary, home invasion and assault will quickly degrade reputation, while extremely resented actions like murder will spread throughout other nearby districts and possibly the entire town. Performing various taboo actions may also cause the player's reputation to drop. For example, performing an autopsy on any body, even a criminal, will harm the player's reputation with the town until they permitted to do so by being declared a "menkhu," a type of religious healer, by the local religion's elders.

The player will die if their health reaches zero. Upon death, the player will be transported to the theater in the center of the town and lambasted by mysterious theater director Mark Immortell for their poor performance in "playing the part" of the main character. He comments that every time the player dies, the "world gets wounded," and says that every "actor" that comes after will have things worse than the ones that came before. The player is struck with a permanent debuff that affects the stats or actions of their character. These penalties range from extremely minor, like the inability to hug other characters or minor changes in interactions, to incredibly damaging, like a reduction in immunity or maximum health. These penalties begin minor, but will progressively get more intense as the player continues to die. They will persist through every game save the player has of that character, even those made before their death. Upon dying eight times and reaching eight permanent penalties, the player is offered the ability to have them removed for an unspecified cost. If the player chooses to do this, they will lose access to one of the endings to the game on that character.

Combat in Pathologic 2 is simple and very dangerous. The player can use a variety of weapons including their fists to attack enemies with, but weapons will degrade over time with use. In melee combat, the player can perform a short attack, which uses a small amount of stamina, and a strong attack, which uses significant stamina, and can block to brace against enemy melee attacks. Strong attacks do more damage against enemies and can break blocks, but take time to prepare. While blocking, the player will consume stamina each time they are hit with an attack, and will begin taking damage if they do not have enough stamina to withstand an attack. Enemies can also perform a kick, which takes an extremely long time to perform but will ignore the player's defense and will stun them for a handful of seconds. The most powerful weapons in the game are firearms, which usually kill their target with a single hit. However, firearms are rare, incredibly expensive, difficult to maintain and require ammunition that is often scarce.

=== Healing and characters ===
The player engages in dialogue with the character of Notkin, one of the children on Artemy Burakh's list.

The primary focus of the player's actions during Pathologic 2 is combating the plague and finding a cure to it. As time goes on, the plague will spread between districts and between people, prompting changes in the course of events and creating new concerns for the player. The player possesses a list of important people which updates whenever something happens to them or they are infected with the plague. Curing citizens of the plague and containing the spread of the disease is not always possible, but attempting to do so can open up new opportunities for the player and successful actions as a healer or helper will greatly improve their reputation with the town.

As the Haruspex, the player is given access to a factory building which allows them to mix various herbal tinctures and other types of medicine, which can be used to cure infected people of the plague. Healing is performed on three "layers" of the body: the green layer, "Medrel" (Nerves), the orange layer, "Ras" (Blood), and the white layer, "Yar" (Bones). Various plants that grow on the steppe can be mixed to create tinctures that allow the player to "sense" disturbances in any one of these bodily layers when healing a person. Administering these tinctures will reveal if there is a disturbance in a particular layer, but will cause the patient to experience substantial pain, which makes the tinctures ineffective. As such, the player must first administer a pain relieving substance like morphine beforehand, and after each tincture is administered. If a disturbance is revealed in an area that overlaps two layers, it removes one layer as a possibility. Once the infected layer is identified, the correct type of antibiotic, corresponding in color to the infected layer, can be administered to the patient. This will improve the patient's health and give them a much greater chance of survival. Administering too many tinctures, allowing the patient's pain to increase too high or giving them the wrong kind of antibiotic all have the chance of worsening the patient's condition, sometimes guaranteeing their death. Successfully healing citizens will substantially improve the Haruspex's relationship with the town, and he may be referred to or officially declared as a "menkhu," or "cutter," a type of religious healer that is permitted to perform various restricted procedures.

== Setting and plot ==
Pathologic 2 takes place in a small town on the steppe only referred to as the Town on the Gorkhon River, or simply "the town". The culture of the town is a fusion of 20th century technology and architecture with ancient steppe culture and traditions, which bring about customs that greatly affect the course of events in the town. Though the exact location and date are never mentioned, it is very heavily implied by character dialogue and environment clues that the game is set during the Russian Civil War.

The world of Pathologic 2 leans heavily into the surreal, meta-commentary and symbolism, frequently making discerning what is fiction and what is "reality" difficult. The events in the town are framed as a play in the style of Bertolt Brecht's "epic theatre", where the player is an "actor" "playing the part" of the player character. The player's "reality" often comes into contact with this framing, with theater-like elements such as spotlights, "scene changes" between day and night, and a disembodied stagehand-like voice appearing intermittently throughout the game. At certain points, such as during plays performed in the town's theater or after the player's death, the player encounters the mysterious and supernatural theater director Mark Immortell, who is often critical of the player's "acting" and frequently breaks the fourth wall, referring to the game's development, referencing the mechanics and inner workings of the game's systems, and referencing events or aspects from the original Pathologic, both contextually and literally.

=== Plot ===
The protagonist of the game is a surgeon named Artemy Burakh, also known as the Haruspex. The game begins at the end of a previous, seemingly failed, run on "day 12" of the first Pathologic. The town is nearly empty, filled with bodies and the sounds of screaming. Artemy speaks to various characters and makes his way to the Cathedral, where he is able to speak to the mysterious theatre manager, Mark Immortell, and requests a "second attempt". This is granted, and time resets to the prologue of Artemy on a train, travelling to the Town. The player controls Artemy through a series of strange dreams and visions. Through dialogue with a character known as the "Fellow Traveller", it is revealed that Artemy was born and raised in the town but has not been back in many years. His father, Isidor Burakh, is the local physician and a leading member of the Kin, the native inhabitants of the steppe. He sent Artemy to the capital as a teenager to gain an education in medicine, but has now requested that he return, stating that "great difficulties" are coming.

Upon arriving in the town, Artemy is greeted by three locals who try to kill him. In a cutscene, he kills the attackers. Nearby strangers in plague doctor suits tell him that the locals suspect him of killing an important resident of the town and that the attack on him was an act of revenge. It is soon revealed that, in fact, two people have seemingly been murdered. The first is Simon Kain, a prominent leader of the town who had previously been assumed to be immortal; the second is Isidor.

Artemy is suspected of patricide and attacked by many of the townspeople, who have been driven to unusual violence. Young women are targeted in particular due to old steppe legends of a "Shabnak-adyr", a creature with clay legs who brings death. A local gang of children known as the "Soul-And-A-Halves" request Artemy's assistance with finding a boy who poisoned their dogs, while an old friend of his known as Bad Grief requests assistance with an injured local man. The leader of the town's economy and industry, a powerful man known as "Fat Vlad", vouches for Artemy, and his innocence is restored.

At his father's funeral, Artemy discovers that his father died of a strange stab wound. He is urged to accept his father's legacy as a menkhu, a special caste of Kin folk with the right to cut open bodies. In doing so, he is given a list containing the names of seven local children, plus a strange steppe sigil that he is told means "udurgh". He learns that these are the children his father felt would be most important in "rebuilding the town", and must be kept safe at all costs. Signs of an outbreak appear in the village, including a strange rot on the sides of buildings and a black cloud in his father's old bedroom. A plague known as "Sand Pest" strikes the town, killing people within a day of infection and leaving the districts abandoned and rife with looters.

Artemy is required to perform daily tasks at the hospital in exchange for food and money, as food prices rise rapidly once the outbreak hits. It is revealed that the Sand Pest has hit the town once before, and Isidor managed to curb the outbreak by boarding up the infected district and leaving all those within to die. He encounters a young Herb Bride - a caste of Kin women who dance barefoot to encourage the growth of sacred herbs such as twyre - who seems to know him, and eventually tells him he is destined to kill her. Artemy is able to use his father's old equipment to create tinctures that increase immunity, and later use organs or blood to produce antibiotics and painkillers. He collects sacred blood from a crack in the ground in an ancient steppe village, and finds that this produces a panacea that cures Sand Pest; however, there is only enough blood for two doses.

An Inquisitor, Aglaya Lilich, arrives in the city. She has been sent to save the town at any cost, and Artemy is warned by others that Inquisitors are inherently manipulative and dangerous. He continues to search for larger amounts of sacred blood, eventually learning that the only way to get enough to stop the plague is to destroy a tower known as the Polyhedron using a recently arrived artillery battalion sent by the "powers that be" to bombard the town and its inhabitants if the plague is unable to be defeated. The mysterious "udurgh" refers to the Earth itself, which is leaking out the sacred blood due to being repeatedly harmed and nearly killed by the Town's presence. Destroying the Polyhedron will produce enough of this blood to cure everyone, but kill the Earth in the process, causing many of the "miracles" of the world - including many aspects of the Kin - to fade and die. It is up to the player which option they choose: either the tower is destroyed and the town is saved, or the tower remains in place and the Kin retake the Town.

== Development ==
In September 2014, Ice-Pick Lodge team launched a fundraising campaign on Kickstarter: according to the Kickstarter description, a remake was supposed to keep the overall plot and world of the original game, but with updated graphics and game mechanics as well as better AI and behavior model of the disease. According to the promises of developers, the duration of the game should exceed 70 hours. On 7 October 2014, the campaign ended with a total donation of $333,127. This money was enough to fulfill the first super goal—the expansion of the in-game town. Initially, the release of the game was scheduled for autumn 2016. The developers claim that there are enough changes and innovations in the game to call it a separate game and not a remake. On 1 December 2016, those who donated a sufficient amount of money to the Kickstarter or the game site were granted a demo version of the game called Pathologic: The Marble Nest, which is essentially a separate game. Later the development was extended until autumn of 2017. On 14 March 2017, The Marble Nest became available to everyone. In August 2017, the development was extended until 2018, changing the Russian name from "Mor (Utopia)" to just "Mor", and the English one from "Pathologic" to "Pathologic 2". At the same time, Pathologic 2 also remains a new game, and not a continuation of the original.

In August 2018, an alpha version of the game was released.

On 28 March 2019, it was officially announced that the first part of the game, telling the story of the Haruspex, will be released on 23 May 2019. The PS4 version released on 6 March 2020.

On 6 July 2020, Ice-Pick Lodge announced that they were working on the second of three promised scenarios, "The Bachelor", stating it is to be released "in the foreseeable future."

On 7 July 2022, Ice-Pick Lodge made a post on their Teletype "About the studio and it's projects" discussing what they have been working on such as Known by Heart and Franz but most notably the Bachelor route, the second playable character coming to Pathologic 2. They stated that by the beginning of October they were making an alpha version of the game.

On 31 December 2023, Ice-Pick Lodge made a new post on their Teletype talking about some of the game mechanics that are going to be in the second character, the Bachelors part of the game.

On 7 October, it was announced that the Bachelor's route would instead be released in 2025 by HypeTrain Digital as a standalone sequel, Pathologic 3, with a dramatically different gameplay and scope and features time travel as a major element. The game will release simultaneously on Microsoft Windows, Playstation 5, and Xbox Series X and S. All Kickstarter backers of the Pathologic 2 will receive Pathologic 3 at no extra charge.

On 14 March 2025, Ice Pick Lodge announced that founder and game director of Pathologic 2 Nikolay Dybowski had departed from the studio to "focus on personal projects and his private life." This statement broke the studio's long-held silence on a number of alcoholism, grooming, and domestic abuse allegations levelled against Dybowski by his ex-wife and several former colleagues.

On 17 March, a free demo for the Bachelor's route titled Pathologic 3: Quarantine was released. Intended as a prologue, it showcases updated visuals, new characters and a prognosis mechanic different from the Haruspex.

== Reception ==
Reception

Aggregate score
Aggregator	Score
Metacritic	PC: 70/100; PS4: 73/100; XONE: 64/100

Pathologic 2 received "mixed or average reviews" according to review aggregator Metacritic, with a score of 70 based on 28 reviews. Critics praised the game's unique atmosphere, but criticized its unforgiving survival mechanics and clunky combat. In response to this, the game's developers added difficulty sliders to the game, allowing customization of specific parameters in addition to overall difficulty.
