= Of Ash and Steel =

- Developers: Fire & Frost
- Publisher: tinyBuild
- Writers: Alexander Pylin; Andrey Emashov
- Engine: Unreal Engine 4
- Platforms: Windows; Playstation 5; Xbox Series X/S
- Release: Windows; November 24, 2025; Playstation 5, Xbox Series X/S; TBA
- Genre: Role-playing video game
- Mode: Single-player

Of Ash and Steel is an action role-playing game developed by Fire & Frost and published by tinyBuild for Windows. It was released on November 24, 2025. Versions for Playstation 5 and Xbox Series X/S, alongside a new DLC "Shattered Faith", will follow at an unnanounced date.

== Gameplay ==
Of Ash and Steel takes place on an island called the Kingdom of the Seven that has fallen into a state of disrepair. The game has no quest marker system to encourage the player to explore the map. Combat features swords and bows as well as magical elements. The player's abilities can be customized, which changes how he is viewed by non-player characters (NPCs).

== Development ==
Fire & Frost stated that their goal as a studio is to make games inspired by role-playing video games (RPGs) from the 2000s. Head of Fire & Frost Studios, Victor Kondakov, was the lead developer. The game was developed in Unreal Engine 4.

== Release ==
The game was originally scheduled to be released on November 6, 2025. The development team delayed its release to November 24 after discovering technical issues that needed additional work. In September 2026, tinyBuild announced that versions for Playstation 5 and Xbox Series X/S, as well as a new DLC "Shattered Faith", are currently in development.

== Reception ==
The game is estimated to have sold 36,500 copies on Steam within the first few days of launch, and netted a gross revenue of $702,000. The active player count on Steam hit a high of 6k in the first week, but has seen a consistent decline over time.

The game sits at 28% Critics Recommend status on OpenCritic, and a Mixed or Average Metascore of 57 on Metacritic.

Critics have pointed to a sizeable map, a likeable protagonist, and combat that starts off clunky but improves over time as the positives, but with lack of a map and difficulty of navigation as holding back the game from achieving its full potential.
