= Punch Club =

2016 video game

- Developer: Lazy Bear Games
- Publisher: tinyBuild
- Engine: Unity
- Platforms: Microsoft Windows; OS X; Linux; iOS; Android; Nintendo 3DS; PlayStation 4; Xbox One; Nintendo Switch
- Release: Microsoft Windows, OS X, Linux: WW: January 8, 2016; iOS: WW: January 14, 2016; Android: WW: January 28, 2016; Nintendo 3DS: NA: January 19, 2017; EU: February 2, 2017; PlayStation 4, Xbox One: WW: March 31, 2017; Nintendo Switch: WW: May 24, 2018
- Genre: Sporting management simulation
- Mode: Single-player

Punch Club (originally titled VHS Story) is a sporting management simulation developed by Lazy Bear Games and published by tinyBuild. In the game, the player manages an upcoming boxer in training and preparation for a series of boxing matches at a local club, while searching for clues of who killed their father. The game was developed as a humorous take on action films of the 1980s and 1990s. The game was released in January 2016 for Microsoft Windows, OS X, iOS, and Android, following a Twitch Plays Pokémon-style event on Twitch. A Nintendo 3DS port of the game was announced in a September 2016 Nintendo Direct for release in January 2017 after some delays. Ports for PlayStation 4 and Xbox One were released on March 31, 2017. A Nintendo Switch version was released on May 24, 2018. A sequel, titled Punch Club 2: Fast Forward, was released on July 20, 2023.

== Gameplay ==
The player controls an unnamed boxer whose father, who helped to train him, was murdered. The boxer aims to continue his training and become the best boxer at a local league, while following clues to lead him to who killed his father. The player manages the boxer around the clock through various locations in a city, including his home, the boxing gym, stores, and his work place. Time progresses when the player is involved in any activity, including moving between these locations.

The boxer character has three primary attributes that contribute towards his skill in boxing and how other boxers are compared: strength, agility, and stamina. These attributes start at one but can be increased by performing various activities, such as exercising or going to work. However, performing these activities will wear away at other attributes, including hunger, alertness, and happiness, and if these attributes are too low, some activities may not be available. These lesser attributes can be regained through eating, sleeping, and other events, though the main boxing attributes will slowly degrade with game time. The boxer will gain friends or other associates over the course of the game which will help also lead the character towards resolving the mystery of his father's murder, perform new activities to help raise the primary attributes, or aid in boosting the lesser attributes. Further, many activities require in-game money, which the player earns through performing work or by winning boxing matches. Thus, the player must determine how to balance the character's activities with the limited in-game time to maintain sufficiently high boxing attributes as to advance up in the boxing ranks. The game has a quest system, but many quests are optional. The game has several possible endings, depending on choices players make.

When the player opts to send the character into a fight, or when the character is forced to fight, the game then allows the player to equip the boxer with a limited number of boxing skills that they have learned to that point including punches, kicks, and blocks; these skills can be swapped out between boxing rounds and these kicks and punches crushes enemy stamina and help occupy a limited number of slots, which brings in a smart, simple and strategic layer to Punch Club. Opponents will also have a similar set of skills, which the player can examine between rounds. Some skills require the player to have a high enough primary attribute to be used, while the effect of others is based on the value of these attributes. Once the player has selected these skills, the round is executed automatically by the computer during the next round. The moves for each fighter during the round are randomly drawn from those selected. The goal is to reduce the health of the opponent to zero before the boxer's is reduced, or before twenty rounds are completed, in which a decision is made by the game as to who won the match. New skills are gained as the player completes more of the game, making them a more adept fighter.

The game itself is written with numerous references to 80s and 90s fighting movies, including references to the Rocky films, Fight Club, Teenage Mutant Ninja Turtles, and other works.

== Story ==
During the boxer's childhood, his father was murdered by an unidentified gunman wearing a trench coat in an alley. The orphaned boxer is adopted by a police officer named Frank until the boxer hits adulthood. While attempting to look for work, the boxer gets beaten in a street fight. Witnessing the boxer's potential, an old man named Mick approaches him and guides the boxer into training at a local gym owned by Silver. The boxer undergoes training and participates in a minor boxing league as well as an underground fight club. While participating in the matches, the man in the trench coat, identified as "the man in black" was briefly seen by the boxer. The owner of the underground fight club explains to the boxer that the man in black is looking for the best fighters to compete in a tournament on a remote island. Depending on the player's actions, the boxer can follow one of the two paths: One is to participate in a boxing championship tournament to gain a professional fighting card, or to fully complete the underground fighting circuit in order to curry favor for a local crime boss named Don.

The story diverges based on the player's choices. If the boxer completed the championship, the boxer sustains an injury, prompting fellow competitor Roy Jackson to fight in the boxer's place. However, Roy is killed while fighting a Russian fighter, prompting the boxer to fight in Russia after recovering. If the boxer completed the underground ring, he is incarcerated after a failed black market deal, and fights for his release after participating in prison fights. Regardless of the path taken, the player learns from a friend of Mick's that the boxer's father was in possession of a medallion, and that the father had split it into two halves with disastrous consequences. During the night of the father's murder, one of the father's friends is accused of committing the murder and imprisoned despite coming across the father's dead body.

Shortly after completing the fight in Russia or the prison, the boxer builds up his reputation as a fighter by either working under Din Kong as a professional boxer, or as an enforcer for Don's criminal organization. Shortly after beating the champions of the respective path, the boxer is invited to the man in black's island, with the final fighter determined by the boxer's chosen path. If the professional fighter route is taken, the boxer fights the underground fight club owner, revealed to be the boxer's brother. If working under Don's wing was taken, the boxer fights a blue-colored ninja (as a reference to Sub-Zero). Shortly after beating the final fighter, the man in black reveals himself to be the boxer's father as the game ends.

== Development ==
Punch Club was initially developed by the Russia-based, three-person Lazy Bear Studios under the name VHS Story, which stood for Video Hero Super Story. Sviatoslav Cherkasov, one of the developers, said that their whole team, in 2015, were around thirty years old, and had grown up around Nintendo Entertainment System and Sega Genesis titles, cartoons like Teenage Mutant Ninja Turtles, and action movies of the 80s and 90s distributed at that time on VHS tapes from stars like Arnold Schwarzenegger, Sylvester Stallone, and Jean-Claude Van Damme. As fans of strategy games, they sought to combine these features, coming up with what they considered to be a Street Fighter manager, inspired by the story of the Rocky movies.

For the fighting portion of the game, the studio found that having the player lack direct control of their boxer fit well with their tycoon game. The selection of moves made it similar to the strategy required for collectible card games, giving the player ways to adjust their strategy based on how well their boxer matched with a competitor even during the course of a fight. Further, as the player lacked interaction during the boxing rounds, the player will be able to watch the fight, which they believed was more entertaining. For the larger game, they did not want to have a story-driven title, and made most of the quests optional.

The game entered its alpha release in December 2014, with original plans to release on Microsoft Windows, but with the potential for other platforms due to the cross-platform Unity engine. To help fund the game, the developers looked to spur pre-release sales in addition to other funding sources, and used Steam's Greenlight feature to gauge interest in the game. The Greenlight process in January 2015 successfully approved the game for release on Steam within five days, one of the fastest Greenlit games on the service. At the Electronic Entertainment Expo 2015, tinyBuild announced that they would be helping to publish the game, now titled Punch Club, for Windows and mobile platforms.

To release the game, tinyBuild created an event similar to the Twitch Plays Pokémon social gaming events, in which the viewers on their Twitch channel can enter commands to control the game's character, with the mass numbers of viewers often giving conflicting commands to make for humorous events in game. The "Twitch Plays Punch Club" event was started on January 7, 2016, promising viewers that once they completed the game, they would release the title, or otherwise release the title on January 25, 2016 regardless. The viewers of the event successfully completed the game in 36 hours, and as promised, the game was officially released on January 9.

In February 2016, Lazy Bear and tinyBuild announced the game had sold over 250,000 copies across all platforms, with over $2 million in revenue. As a result, they announced plans to release in March 2016 a free expansion, "The Dark Fist", along with improvements to the game, including integration with Twitch to allow players to bet virtual currency on fights which can unlock additional in-game content, and saves that work cross-platform.

tinyBuild's Netherlands studio helped to port the game to the PlayStation 4 and Xbox One, which were released on March 31, 2017. It was also ported to the Nintendo Switch which was released on May 24, 2018.

== Reception ==
Reception

Aggregate scores
Aggregator	Score
Metacritic	PC: 73/100; XONE: 76/100; NS: 62/100 iOS: 77/100; 3DS: 68/100
OpenCritic	28% Recommend

Punch Club received "Mixed or Average" reviews according to review aggregator Metacritic.

By March 2016, Alex Nichiporchik of tinyBuild who published Punch Club, reported that the game has sold more than 300,000 copies, but also have reported piracy of the title exceeding 1.6 million units. Punch Club was one of the disputed titles in the controversy on the legitimacy of key-reselling by the online store G2A.

== Sequel ==
In February 2023, a sequel was announced under the title Punch Club 2: Fast Forward. It was released on July 20 2023 for Microsoft Windows, Nintendo Switch, PlayStation 4, PlayStation 5, Xbox One and Xbox Series X/S.
