= Graveyard Keeper =

2018 video game

- Developer: Lazy Bear Games
- Publisher: tinyBuild
- Composer: Hamza el Hamri
- Engine: Unity
- Platforms: Linux; macOS; Windows; Xbox One; Android; iOS; Nintendo Switch; PlayStation 4
- Release: August 15, 2018: Linux, macOS, Win, Xbox One; WW: August 15, 2018; Android, iOS, PS4, Switch; WW: June 27, 2019
- Genre: Management simulation
- Mode: Single-player

Graveyard Keeper is a 2018 graveyard-themed management simulation video game developed by independent Russian indie game studio Lazy Bear Games and published by tinyBuild. It follows an ordinary man who was transported to another world with a medieval-fantasy setting and assumes the task of tending for the village's graveyard while looking for a way back home. The game's alpha version was released for Windows in May 2018, followed by the regular release for Windows and Xbox One later that year. Versions for the Nintendo Switch and PlayStation 4 were released on June 27, 2019. It was released in Japan on February 6, 2020.

A sequel, titled Graveyard Keeper II, was released on September 22, 2026.

== Gameplay ==
Gameplay screenshot

Graveyard Keeper is a graveyard-keeping management simulation game inspired by Stardew Valley and based on Harvest Moon. At the start of the game, the player becomes the recipient of a plot of land including a small graveyard once owned by his predecessor near a small town. The cemetery plot is initially overrun with boulders, trees, stumps, and weeds, and the player must work to clear them in order to restart its operation, tending to graves and even the church so as to generate revenue and bring donations to church coffers. Your ultimate goal is to get your character to open a portal back to his old world. To that end, you need information and help from various NPCs, whom you will be trying to please them, or do their quests. Such quests usually involves gameplay elements like bringing them some crafted or collectable items like oil, honey etc. More gameplay elements and areas slowly unlock throughout the game as you unlock new technologies. The skill tree in this game is called a Technology Tree, and you unlock new technologies to progress in the game. Beyond the early game, Graveyard Keeper requires you to have three different types of experience points: Red, Blue, and Green to unlock most of the technologies. Other than tending to graves and clearing out environmental elements, the game also has farming, smithing, rudimentary combat, multi-level dungeon, fishing, and an extensive crafting system.

== Story ==
The player takes the role of a person hit by a car and sent to an unfamiliar world with medieval fantasy setting where he is tasked with taking care of the local cemetery and church. Determined to return home and reunite with his lover, the graveyard keeper interacts with the locals while helping with their problems. Eventually, the keeper learns of a portal that is said to make any wish come true, but needs some special magic items to make it work, which are in possession of some of the village's most influential characters. After earning their trust and obtaining the items, the keeper bids farewell to his friends and wishes to reunite with his lover, but instead of returning him home, the portal brings his lover to his side instead. Extra DLC content reveals that the keeper can't return home because he (just like his predecessors) has the sacred task of acting as an intermediary between the village's inhabitants and the afterlife and it was revealed that the Ancient God brought him here and split him in two: his aggressive side is sent to the Town while his compassionate side had his memory wiped of what happened to him recently and was assigned to become the new graveyard keeper for the village (this is also why he cannot enter the town and dies every time he attempts to do so).

== Reception ==
Reception

Aggregate scores
Aggregator	Score
Metacritic	PC: 69/100; XONE: 70/100; NS: 65/100
OpenCritic	28% recommend

Review scores
Publication	Score
Nintendo Life	6/10
Nintendo World Report	7/10

Graveyard Keeper received "mixed or average" reviews according to review aggregator website Metacritic.

== DLC ==
The Breaking Dead DLC for Graveyard Keeper, was announced in 2018. It was released free for owners of the PC version of the base game, while console versions were sold separately. The DLC adds a resurrection table that allows corpses to be reanimated as zombies and assigned to tasks including gathering resources, crafting items, gardening and transporting goods. With sufficient zombies, parts of the game's production and supply systems can be automated.

A second, paid DLC called "Stranger Sins" was released on October 28, 2019, which delves further into the game's lore and characters. It introduces a new Tavern for you to manage by producing and selling food and drink in large quantities at excellent prices, and an entirely new quest-chain which adds personalities to many of the previously silent villagers. It also adds a new ending for completing the main game after finishing the DLC questline. This adds an interesting twist to the tavern-managing mechanic, as the player will need to complete complex quests with each of the characters in order to find all of the relics that will increase Tavern Reputation. The larger the number, the more high-quality drinks you can sell. Events also allow the player to sell food. There are four known events in the game.

A third, paid DLC called "Game of Crone" was released on October 27, 2020, with additional story content. It features a camp of refugees from the Inquisition the player must help to develop while investigating the mystery of a vampire terrorizing the villagers. It also includes a side-quest involving the donkey that brings the corpses enlisting the player's help on his plan to start a communist revolution.

A fourth, paid DLC called "Better Save Soul" was released on October 28, 2021. It offers the chance for the player to investigate the sins of the corpses brought to them. With the help of a new shady friend, Euric, and an amnesiac half-ghost Smiler, the player must remove the sins from the living and dead alike. This DLC also offers new ways to improve the quality of corpses and adds remote control to some of the crafting stations.

== Physical version ==
A physical release of the game, titled Graveyard Keeper - Undead Edition, was released for the Nintendo Switch by Atari on February 21, 2025. The release contains the base game and all three DLC packs.
