= Guts & Glory (book series) =

Children's history series

- Guts & Glory: The American Civil War (2014); Guts & Glory: The Vikings (2015); Guts & Glory: World War II (2016); Guts & Glory: The American Revolution (2017)
- Author: Ben Thompson
- Illustrator: C.M. Butzer
- Cover artist: C.M. Butzer
- Country: United States
- Language: English
- Genre: Nonfiction
- Publisher: Little, Brown and Company
- Published: October 28, 2014–May 16, 2017
- No. of books: Four
- Website: GutsandGloryHistory

The Guts and Glory series is a four-book series written by Ben Thompson between 2014 and 2017. The series is written to appeal to children between the ages of eight and twelve, and focuses on violent and dramatic events. The books are all illustrated by C.M. Butzer.

== Guts & Glory: The American Civil War ==
On October 28, 2014, Thompson came out with the first book of the series, entitled Guts & Glory: The American Civil War. In the book's 372 pages, he covers the whole war, in an unbiased perspective, highlighting the acts of bravery, the crazy moments, and crazy people.

School Library Journal said the book "ably covers major battles... in a roughly chronological order," Booklist points out its lack of bias by saying, "While each chapter covers a battle...this endeavor is not a greatest-hits recap," and Publishers Weekly says the "narrative effectively sketches the major causes of the conflict" and "brings to life" the various issues of the day.

=== Awards ===
- A 2015 International Literacy Association Teachers' Choice
- A 2015 National Parenting Publications Silver Winner
- An Amazon Best Book of the Month

== Guts & Glory: The Vikings ==
On June 9, 2015, Thompson came out with the second book: Guts & Glory: The Vikings. The book tells about the Viking way of life, their beliefs, their wars, and their pillaging. It also tells the reader about the heroes and villains of theses wars, from the man who stopped an army single-handedly to a cruel queen who burned people alive.

== Guts & Glory: World War II ==
The third book, Guts & Glory: World War II came out on March 1, 2016. Starting from the Defense of Sihang Warehouse, the book tells about the major battles like Operation Barbarossa and D-day, while also telling the stories of the escape from the Sobibor death camp and Nancy Wake, besides others.

== Guts & Glory: The American Revolution ==
The final book of the series came out on May 15, 2017, under the name Guts & Glory: The American Revolution. The book tells all about the American Revolution, from the basics in the Battles of Lexington and Concord and the Declaration of Independence to the Culper Spy Ring and the Battle of Stony Point, in which Thompson makes sure to tell about the Virginia Hercules, who fought off multiple British soldiers by himself.

School Library Journal describes the book as "comprehensive" and says that it "provides a good overview of the revolution." It does note, however, that a "few facts are incorrect or misrepresented," pointing out three such cases. Booklist's review is not unlike School Library Journal's. It calls the book " a meaty delight" with "digestible chapters packed with info" and "sidebars full of interesting tidbits," while also pointing out that "occasionally the hyperbole stretches too far." Their similarities continue, with School Library Journal finishes off by saying, "Minor errors aside, the book is sure to enthrall readers," and Booklist saying that "amends are made with the recognition of a number of lesser-known players," before listing a few.

Kirkus Reviews praises the audiobook, saying, "The strength here... is the lively storytelling style.... Lovers of Hamilton: An American Musical will enjoy the information and breezy tone." It also won a Parents' Choice Silver Award for Audiobook.
