= Guts and Glory =

2018 video game

- Developer: HakJak Productions
- Publisher: tinyBuild
- Engine: Unity
- Platforms: Linux macOS; Microsoft Windows; Nintendo Switch; PlayStation 4 Xbox One
- Release: July 19, 2018
- Genre: Simulation
- Mode: Single-player

Guts and Glory is a 3D simulation video game in which players, choosing from a variety of vehicles, navigate a race course while dodging with lethal traps and hazards like buzzsaws, spikes, and land mines.

The game was created and developed solely by Jed Steen of HakJak Productions and released by independent publisher tinyBuild. Guts and Glory debuted on Steam in 2017 following a successful 2016 Kickstarter campaign, becoming a "cult favorite," according to one review website. It ranked as the most popular game on IndieDB during 2016 and Steen claims that it sold more than 100,000 copies on Steam Early Access. The version 1.0 release on Steam came on July 19, 2018.

Guts and Glory is part of a trend in video games in which gore is "played off for comedic effect," wrote one reviewer. Another review notes that "severed limbs spray gallons of unlimited blood" with "real time dismemberment", although the blood is said to be "cartoonish enough that any passing minors won't be scarred for life". The game's characters and ragdoll physics have drawn comparisons to Happy Wheels.

The game is available on PlayStation 4, Xbox One, Nintendo Switch, PCs, Macs, and Linux. The console versions have been criticized for a lack of community-designed levels and a map editor for users.

Based on their partnership, Steen joined tinyBuild to open a studio in Boise, Idaho in 2020.

== Reception ==
Guts and Glory received mixed reviews. On Metacritic, the Xbox One version of the game holds a score of 59/100 based on 6 reviews.
