= Kingmakers =

- Developer: Redemption Road Games
- Publisher: tinyBuild
- Directors: Paul Fisch; Ian Fisch
- Engine: Unreal Engine 5
- Platform: Windows
- Genre: Real-time strategy
- Modes: Single-player, multiplayer

Kingmakers is an upcoming action-strategy sandbox game developed by Redemption Road Games and published by tinyBuild. The game is planned to be released for Windows.

== Plot ==
Kingmakers is set in medieval Great Britain in 1400 AD. The player assumes the role of an elite task force operator, transported 500 years back in time to said area to avert a future apocalypse. Depending on player choices, they can fight for England, Scotland or Wales, and ultimately change the course of human history with multiple possible endings.

== Gameplay ==
Kingmakers is a third-person sandbox game with action and strategy elements. The player can switch between a third-person shooter mode and a top-down strategy mode. In the shooter mode, the player can use modern weapons and vehicles such as assault rifles, shotguns, grenade launchers, armored cars, and helicopters to fight against medieval enemies. Meanwhile, in the strategy mode, the player can command their own army of medieval units such as cavalry, archers, and swordsmen. The player can also customize their army with different banners, colors, and formations. The game features a campaign that allows the player to influence the outcome of the war and the history of England. The game also supports co-op mode for up to four players, where each player can control their own army.

== Development ==
Kingmakers is developed by Redemption Road Games. Kingmakers was first announced by publisher tinyBuild on February 20, 2024. The studio has been working on the game for over five years. The game has been further delayed from its 8 October 2025 release date.

In July 2026, tinyBuild and Redemption Road showcased the first-ever public playable demo of Kingmakers at Bilibili World 2026.

== Film adaptation ==
On August 8, 2024, a live-action film adaptation of the game was announced to be in development with Story Kitchen, TinyBuild, and Redemption Road Games. On December 15, 2025, Netflix bought the rights to distribute the film with TinyBuild and 21 Laps Entertainment producing while Story Kitchen remains on board for creative leadership. Flashback writer and director Christopher MacBride is attached to pen the script.

== See also ==
- Alternate history
- Darkest of Days
- Axis of Time
- G.I. Samurai
- Kalvan series
- Gate: Jieitai Kano Chi nite, Kaku Tatakaeri
- A Connecticut Yankee in King Arthur's Court
- The Time Machine
