= Party Hard (video game) =

2015 video game

- Nintendo Switch digital artwork
- Developer: Pinokl Games
- Publisher: tinyBuild
- Director: Alexandr Potapenko
- Producers: Alex Nichiporchik; Igor Arterchuk
- Designers: Alexandr Ponomariov; Igor Arterchuk; Alexandr Potapenko
- Programmer: Alexandr Ponomariov
- Artists: Sergiy Polobyuk; Vitaliy Bondarchuk
- Writer: Mike Rose
- Composer: Ressa Schwarzwald
- Engine: Unity
- Platforms: Android; Fire OS; iOS; Linux; Microsoft Windows; OS X; PlayStation 4; Xbox One; Nintendo Switch
- Release: Microsoft Windows, OS X, Linux: WW: 25 August 2015; Fire OS: WW: 20 November 2015; PlayStation 4, Xbox One: WW: 26 April 2016; Android, iOS: WW: 10 November 2016; Nintendo Switch: WW: 22 November 2018
- Genres: Action, stealth
- Modes: Single-player, multiplayer (Steam and Nintendo Switch only)

Party Hard is an action stealth video game developed by Pinokl Games and published by tinyBuild for Microsoft Windows, OS X, Linux, PlayStation 4, Xbox One, and Nintendo Switch. A mobile port, Party Hard Go, was released for Fire OS, iOS, and Android. In the game, players assume the role of a serial killer who infiltrates several parties with the objective of killing all attendants without getting caught.

== Gameplay ==
If a player kills a person within another party-goer's sight or found close to a fresh body the witness will become alarmed and attempt to call the cops, indicating the player as a suspected for a limited period of time; requiring you to dispatch the witness or escape the location. If the NPC stumbles on a dead body the emergency services are called and corpses are body-bagged while the cops do a basic patrol which might reveal other murders. Players can hide dead bodies in a limited number of dumpsters and other specific containers to avoid detection. Players can set traps (poisoning drinks, exploding speakers, destroying dance floors, cutting down trees, starting fires and short-circuiting electricity boards) to kill and influence partygoer movement and actions. Additional to your basic knife players have limited use weapons like swords (with an area damage), bombs and stun grenades which are collected from containers along with disguises and other collectibles. Bouncers are a stronger enemy who do not panic and will chase the player to quickly subdue them when detected. Shortcuts allow the player to escape locations quickly and evade capture, if over used the shortcut will become blocked. Partying people are generally inattentive and quick actions can take down multiple partiers before the become alerted. After successive calls the police become increasingly hard to escape and eventually, if too many are killed, Special Agents are called in. If a player dies or gets arrested the level can be continued by the remaining players and all players will be revived when starting the next level. However, if all players are killed, this results in a failure.

=== Twitch integration ===
The game integrates with the streaming website Twitch. Viewers of a live broadcast can trigger events within the game, such as SWAT raids or rampaging bears. The Twitch-exclusive events were later enabled for non-streaming players.

== Plot ==
Initially, you play as an unnamed man who is described as "a guy who just wanted some peace and quiet" who finds it difficult to sleep when there are active party-goers nearby. He decides to kill them all using a standard knife. There are five other unlockable characters, including a Ninja (obtained by clearing a level with no bodies found), a Policeman (obtained by completing all the levels), Katie (obtained by escaping the police 5 times in one game; also the only person available on the Miami Beach level), the Butcher (obtained by killing 20 people), and Hinter (starts the game with). Each level takes place at a party with a different theme, interactive objects, and "special guests," who are people that you call to distract/kill party guests. The completion of these levels also unlocks the storyline, which focuses on the Party Hard Killings of Autumn 2000, as detailed by Police Inspector John West.

The story starts in the present with John being interviewed in the interrogation room by a mysterious man named Darius, who asks him about the killings. His narration, as well as the game, starts in the year 2000, somewhere in San Francisco County with the killer, fed up with the noise and of a small neighborhood party. He then takes a knife and a hockey mask to start a massacre at a BBQ house party somewhere in North Beach (Salinas, California according to menu map). After he is "done" with the partygoers, he gets picked up by bikers, who take him to a ranch party in Bakersfield, and after that, he leaves to Las Vegas via a shuttle bus to a casino party and a rooftop party near Arizona.

Several months later, he reaches Bay City, Texas and boards a cruise liner heading from Trinity Bay to Florida, only for it to burn down and sink near Miami, Florida as the killer watches. There, he also meets up with John's daughter, Katie West, who follows in his footsteps by attacking a beach party, either being forced into it by her by the killer or as a way to join him in his killings; according to Darius, Katie was abused by John, which could be her motive. The killer takes a party bus on Route 10 with Katie, only to murder everyone on board. John finds them when the party bus gets stuck on the road after they killed the driver, but it is too late since the killer has already slaughtered his daughter. The killer was almost about to put himself in jail, until on the way through the forest he somehow left John unconscious and cut down a tree, causing it to fall on the police car.

They end up crashing near Salina, Kansas at a sawmill. After murdering everyone there, the killer fakes being a victim and escapes the scene by ambulance. He murders his way through a rooftop pool party at Denver, Colorado and a Halloween party in Wyoming. After a campus party in Salt Lake City, Utah was hit, he finally ended up at a party in the San Francisco subway hosted by some of his fanatics, where the detective sought to stop the serial killer.

In the whole final cutscene, the killer is shown seated on the train platform after killing everybody in the underground, with John and Darius's voices speaking to each other in the interrogation room, showing that the interrogation was all going on inside the man's head. It is revealed that John has a split personality disorder and that Darius, his alternate personality, was the serial killer behind the Party Hard Killings. John finally confronts him about the murders, but Darius states that he never fought back against him and that some part of him enjoyed killing partygoers just as much he did. John argues and tries to state "[he isn't] like him", but Darius starts to work him over, telling him to "let it go". The game ends with John saying "Come on, Darius. Let's go home", and a clip of them in the underground, with John putting on his policeman hat (a symbol of his usual self) and hockey mask (the symbol for Darius).

== Reception ==
Reception

Aggregate score
Aggregator	Score
Metacritic	(NS) 75/100 (PC) 64/100 (PS4) 65/100 (XONE) 51/100

Review scores
Publication	Score
Destructoid	6/10
GameSpot	7/10

Party Hard received "mixed or average" reviews, according to video game review aggregator Metacritic.

== Sequel and spin-off ==
In October 2017, a spin-off simulation game titled Party Hard Tycoon (later renamed to Party Tycoon) was released as an Early Access title on Steam. It involves managing and organizing parties in the Party Hard Universe. Gameplay involves choosing venues, planning layouts, catering, entertainment, and figuring out how to keep guests happy. However, its development was discontinued in 2019, leaving the game in Early Access limbo.

A sequel, Party Hard 2, was released in 2018 for Microsoft Windows, Nintendo Switch, PlayStation 4 and Xbox One.
