= TinyBuild =

American video game publisher and developer

tinyBuild Inc.
- Type: Public
- Traded as: AIM: TBLD
- ISIN: USU8884H1033
- Industry: Video games
- Founded: 2011; 15 years ago in the Netherlands
- Founders: Alex Nichiporchik; Tom Brien
- Headquarters: Bellevue, Washington, US
- Area served: Worldwide
- Key people: Alex Nichiporchik (CEO)
- Owner: Alex Nichiporchik (58.1%); Atari SA (7.9%); Griffin Gaming Partners (3.2%)
- Number of employees: ~200 (2025)
- Website: tinybuild.com

tinyBuild Inc. is an American publisher and developer of indie games based in Bellevue, Washington.

The company was established by Alex Nichiporchik and Tom Brien in 2011 to expand Brien's game No Time to Explain into a commercial release. Building from the success of the game's Steam release in 2013, tinyBuild partnered with DoubleDutch Games for the development and release of SpeedRunners, which landed tinyBuild further publishing deals. Between March 2020 and 2023, tinyBuild acquired or established a number of new studios as part of an expansion strategy. However, since 2023, due to the poor performance of many of its subsidiaries in addition to financial difficulties, tinyBuild has closed multiple studios as part of a restructuring and downsizing effort, laid off employees at others and sold off 2 subsidiaries. No further M&A activity has taken place after 2023. It became a public company on the Alternative Investment Market in March 2021.

== History ==
tinyBuild was founded in 2011 by Alex Nichiporchik (Latvian: Aleksandrs Ņičiporčiks) and Tom Brien. Nichiporchik came from Latvia and had been a professional Warcraft III: Reign of Chaos player in the early 2000s, which made him enough money to drop out of high school and pursue a career in video game journalism. While an employee of Spil Games in the Netherlands in 2010, he became interested in Flash games. He came across Super Meat Boy, which led to him to want to get into the business. Nichiporchik discovered No Time to Explain, a Flash game by Tom Brien, which he thought could be as successful as Super Meat Boy. Nichiporchik and Brien established tinyBuild in 2011 as a developer to expand No Time to Explain into a commercial release. The company headquarters were based in the Netherlands with Nichiporchik until both relocated to Seattle later on.

tinyBuild launched a crowdfunding campaign for the game via Kickstarter and raised US$26,000 from a $7,000 target. tinyBuild had agreed with the Russian publisher Buka Entertainment that the latter would publish retail versions of No Time to Explain in Russia, get the game released on Steam, and grant tinyBuild $24,500 in royalties in advance. However, Buka Entertainment failed to communicate with tinyBuild until stating that it was forced to cancel the project, withholding the royalties. As No Time to Explain could not be launched via Steam, tinyBuild released it independently. The game recouped its development cost but did not turn a significant profit. tinyBuild went into hiatus for nearly a year thereafter until Steam introduced the Greenlight process for game approval. No Time to Explain became one of the first games to be greenlit for Steam in 2013 and had a successful release on the platform. Nichiporchik stated this experience burnt out tinyBuild, which was no longer interested in pursuing development but did not want to waste the newfound success. The company invested in, co-developed, and published the game SpeedRunners, which led to more developers pitching their games to tinyBuild, incrementally turning the company into a publisher. To expand its publishing operations, it hired the video game journalist Mike Rose in December 2014.

tinyBuild obtained $3.75 million in seed funding from Makers Fund in April 2018, followed by $15 million in series A funding from an undisclosed investor in February 2019. The company established its first internal studio, HakJak Studios, with Guts and Glory developer Jed "HakJak" Steen in Boise, Idaho, in March 2020. Nichiporchik believed that indie game publishers like tinyBuild would have to move away from "transactional relationships"—wherein the developer and publisher would work on one game and then move on—and instead build long-term relationships with the developers. At this time, tinyBuild had 150 employees. tinyBuild acquired the development team behind Hello Neighbor from Dynamic Pixels in July 2020 for an undisclosed sum to establish the studio Eerie Guest Studios in Hilversum. The company invested more than US$15 million into the Hello Neighbor franchise. tinyBuild invested US$3 million into Hologryph, the team behind the Hello Neighbor multi-player spin-off, Secret Neighbor in November 2020. In February 2021, tinyBuild acquired three studios it had previously worked with: We're Five Games, Hungry Couch, and Moon Moose.

tinyBuild announced in February 2021 that it was to pursue an initial public offering on the Alternative Investment Market of the London Stock Exchange with the ticker symbol "TBLD". At the time, Nichiporchik owned 61.1% of the company, while the Chinese company NetEase owned 14.3%. The company's shares began trading on March 9, 2021, with an initial market capitalization of £340 million.

tinyBuild acquired the studio Animal in August 2021 for $10.2 million; Animal had been working on publishing their upcoming game Rawmen through tinyBuild.

tinyBuild acquired Versus Evil and Red Cerberus in November 2021.

The company acquired the intellectual property rights to the bulk of Bossa Studios' games including Surgeon Simulator and I Am Bread, for US$3 million in August 2022. In 2022, it acquired Konfa Games during the development of Despot's Game.

In April 2022, tinyBuild acquired DeMagic Games, the studio developing Hello Neighbor: Nicky's Diaries at the time, for $1.52 million.

In 2022, following the Russian invasion of Ukraine and subsequent war, tinyBuild effectively relocated more than 100 people.

In December 2022, tinyBuild acquired Scythe Studios, the developer of Happy's Humble Burger Farm.

In March 2023, tinyBuild acquired NotGames, the studio behind Not For Broadcast, for an upfront cash payment of $1.5 million, plus up to $4.2 million in earn-out subject to financial targets.

In June 2023, in its H1 2023 financial report, tinyBuild said it had underperformed. The company blamed lower revenue from platform deals due to decreased investment in non-AAA titles, and the shortfall of its subsidiaries Versus Evil and Red Cerberus (which it acquired in 2021). tinyBuild said it would be moving away from third-party publishing and focusing more on own-IP. Following the report, the company's shares fell 78.8%. The company's overall stocks had declined 92.86% since 2021.

On December 5, 2023 tinyBuild announced it had resolved a legal dispute with Versus Evil for $3.5 million plus legal costs. Versus Evil filed suit alleging tinyBuild breached the acquisition agreement by failing to make timely capital contributions since 2022, withholding required funds, and not providing the promised level of material support. Steve Escalante, general manager of Versus Evil, separately claimed that $3 million in shares and options had not been paid. Following the settlement, Escalante left Versus Evil.

In the same period, tinyBuild lowered its revenue forecasts for FY 2023, citing weaker-than-expected trading in October and Q4. Several major contracts anticipated had failed to materialize before the end of 2023 and were delayed indefinitely, the company also said. CEO Alex Nichiporchik additionally attributed the challenges to weak demand for video games and a reversal of market dynamics. Stronger demand during the 2020-2022 pandemic period had previously benefited tinyBuild.

Later on that same day, tinyBuild laid off between 10%-30% of its staff per studio and shuttered three subsidiaries in the following weeks, citing continued financial challenges and lackluster financial results. The first 2 shuttered subsidiaries were HakJak Studios and We're Five Games. NotGames was sold to an unknown buyer, with tinyBuild retaining the game's intellectual property rights.

Later that same month, Atari invested $2 million in tinyBuild in exchange for a 7.5% stake in the company. A day after, on December 22, 2023, Versus Evil was shut down. In January 2024, tinyBuild nearly ran out of cash but secured $12.3 million in emergency funding from investors. Following this, tinyBuild closed Moon Moose, the developer of Cartel Tycoon, in February 2024, and shut down DeMagic Games, the developer of Hello Neighbor: Nicky's Diaries, in March 2024. In April 2024, tinyBuild sold the intellectual property rights to Totally Reliable Delivery Service to Atari, followed by the sale of the Surgeon Simulator intellectual property rights in June 2024. In April 2025, tinyBuild sold Red Cerberus to TestFly for an initial price of $1.5 million, which was later reduced to $1.1 million after standard post-completion adjustments.

In 2025, tinyBuild became once again profitable with a positive adjusted EBITDA and stronger operating cash flow. In that same year, tinyBuild had nearly 200 employees, excluding those at Red Cerberus.

In June 2026, Griffin Gaming Partners bought a 3.24% equity stake in tinyBuild.

== Subsidiaries ==
=== Studios ===
Name	Location	Founded	Acquired
Animal	Pasadena, California, United States	2015	August 2021
Eerie Guest Studios	Hilversum, Netherlands	July 2020	—
Hologryph	Lviv, Ukraine	2016	November 2020
Hungry Couch Games	Moscow, Russia	2019	February 2021
DogHelm	Los Angeles, California, United States	2015	June 2021
Bad Pixel	Voronezh, Russia	2008	September 2021
Konfa Games	St. Petersburg, Russia	2017	August 2022
Scythe Studios	Phoenix, Arizona, United States	2017	November 2022

=== Former ===
Name	Location	Founded	Acquired	Closed / Sold	Status
HakJak Studios	Boise, Idaho, United States	March 2020	—	December 2023	Closed
Versus Evil	Baltimore, United States	2013	November 2021	December 2023	Closed
NotGames	Knaphill, Surrey, England	2013	March 2023	December 2023	Sold
We're Five Games	Minneapolis, Minnesota, United States	April 2012	February 2021	2023	Closed
Moon Moose	St. Petersburg, Russia	2019	February 2021	February 2024	Closed
DeMagic Games	Ukraine	2019	April 2022	March 2024	Closed
Red Cerberus	São Paulo, Brazil	July 2017	November 2021	April 2025	Sold to TestFly

== Games developed ==
Year	Title	Platform(s)
2011	No Time to Explain	Linux, macOS, Microsoft Windows
2015	No Time to Explain Remastered	Linux, macOS, Microsoft Windows, PlayStation 4, Xbox One
2023	Hello Engineer	Microsoft Windows, Xbox One, PlayStation 4, Nintendo Switch
2024	DUCKSIDE (Early Access)	Microsoft Windows, Xbox Series X/S, PlayStation 5
2025	Pigeon Simulator	Xbox Series X/S, Microsoft Windows
TBA	Last Harbor	Microsoft Windows

== Games published ==
Year	Title	Developer(s)	Platform(s)	Ref.
2013	Not the Robots	2DArray	Linux, macOS, Microsoft Windows	
2014	Fearless Fantasy	Enter Skies Entertainment	Android, iOS, Microsoft Windows	
2014	Spoiler Alert	Megafuzz	Android, iOS, Linux, macOS, Microsoft Windows	
2014	Lovely Planet	Quicktequila	Linux, macOS, Microsoft Windows, PlayStation 4, Xbox One, Wii U	
2015	Divide by Sheep	Bread Team	Android, iOS, macOS, Microsoft Windows	
2015	Party Hard	Pinokl Games	Linux, macOS, Microsoft Windows, Nintendo Switch, PlayStation 4, Xbox One	
2015	Snail Bob 2	Hunter Hamster	Android, iOS, Linux, macOS, Microsoft Windows	
2016	Punch Club	Lazy Bear Games	Android, iOS, Linux, macOS, Microsoft Windows, Nintendo 3DS, Nintendo Switch, PlayStation 4, Xbox One	
2016	Dungelot: Shattered Lands	Red Winter	Android, iOS, Microsoft Windows	
2016	SpeedRunners	DoubleDutch Games	iOS, Linux, macOS, Microsoft Windows, Nintendo Switch, PlayStation 4, Xbox One	
2016	One Troll Army	FlyAnvil	macOS, Microsoft Windows	
2016	Boid	Mokus Games	Microsoft Windows	
2016	Lovely Planet Arcade	Quicktequila	Linux, macOS, Microsoft Windows	
2016	Road to Ballhalla	Torched Hill	Microsoft Windows, Nintendo Switch, PlayStation 4, Xbox One	
2016	The Final Station	Do My Best Games	Linux, macOS, Microsoft Windows, Nintendo Switch, PlayStation 4, Xbox One	
2016	Diaries of a Spaceport Janitor	Sundae Month	macOS, Microsoft Windows	
2016	Clustertruck	Landfall Games	Linux, macOS, Microsoft Windows, Nintendo Switch, PlayStation 4, Xbox One	
2016	Party Hard Go	Pinokl Games	Android, iOS, Fire OS	
2017	Stage Presence	Sea Green Games	Microsoft Windows	
2017	Mr. Shifty	Team Shifty	Linux, macOS, Microsoft Windows, Nintendo Switch, PlayStation 4, Xbox One	
2017	Community Inc	T4 Interactive	macOS, Microsoft Windows, Nintendo Switch	
2017	Phantom Trigger	Bread Team	Microsoft Windows, Nintendo Switch, PlayStation 4, Xbox One	
2017	Party Hard Tycoon (early access)	Pinokl Games; Kverta	Microsoft Windows	
2017	Hello Neighbor	Dynamic Pixels	Android, iOS, Microsoft Windows, Nintendo Switch, PlayStation 4, Stadia, Xbox One	
2018	Garage: Bad Trip	Zombie Dynamics	macOS, Microsoft Windows, Nintendo Switch	
2018	Outpost Zero (early access)	Symmetric Games	Microsoft Windows	
2018	Guts and Glory	HakJak Studios	Linux, macOS, Microsoft Windows, Nintendo Switch, PlayStation 4, Xbox One	
2018	Graveyard Keeper	Lazy Bear Games	Android, iOS, Linux, macOS, Microsoft Windows, Nintendo Switch, PlayStation 4, Xbox One	
2018	Party Hard 2	Pinokl Games; Kverta; Hologryph	Microsoft Windows	
2018	Rapture Rejects (early access)	Galvanic Games; Explosm Games	Microsoft Windows	
2018	Hello Neighbor: Hide and Seek	Dynamic Pixels	iOS, Microsoft Windows, Nintendo Switch, PlayStation 4, Stadia, Xbox One	
2019	Pandemic Express	Tall Boys Team	Microsoft Windows	
2019	Swag and Sorcery	Lazy Bear Games; Uroboros Games	iOS, Microsoft Windows	
2019	Pathologic 2	Ice-Pick Lodge	Microsoft Windows, PlayStation 4, Xbox One	
2019	Lovely Planet 2: April Skies	Quicktequila	Linux, macOS, Microsoft Windows	
2019	Streets of Rogue	Matt Dabrowski	Linux, macOS, Microsoft Windows, Nintendo Switch, PlayStation 4, Xbox One	
2019	Totally Reliable Delivery Service	We're Five Games	Android, macOS, Microsoft Windows, Nintendo Switch, PlayStation 4, Xbox One	
2019	Waking	Jason Oda	Microsoft Windows	
2019	Secret Neighbor	Hologryph; Dynamic Pixels	Microsoft Windows, Stadia, Xbox One, Nintendo Switch	
2020	Not For Broadcast	NotGames	Microsoft Windows	
2020	Hello Puppets!	Otherworld Interactive	Microsoft Windows (VR Exclusive)	
2020	Hellpoint	Cradle Games	Linux, macOS, Microsoft Windows, Nintendo Switch, PlayStation 4, Xbox One, Stadia, PlayStation 5, Xbox Series X/S	
2020	Kill It With Fire	Casey Donnellan Games LLC	Microsoft Windows, iOS, Android, Nintendo Switch, PlayStation 4, Xbox One	
2020	Punch Club 2: Fast Forward	Lazy Bear Games	Microsoft Windows	
2020	Startup Panic	Algorocks	Android, iOS, Microsoft Windows	
2020	Waking	Jason Oda	Microsoft Windows, Xbox One	
2021	Black Skylands (early access)	Hungry Couch	Microsoft Windows	
2021	Cartel Tycoon (early access)	Moon Moose	Microsoft Windows	
2021	Happy's Humble Burger Farm	Scythe Dev Team	Microsoft Windows, PlayStation 4, PlayStation 5, Xbox One, Xbox Series X/S, Nintendo Switch	
2021	Mayhem in Single Valley	Fluxscopic Ltd.	Microsoft Windows	
2021	Potion Craft: Alchemist Simulator (early access)	niceplay games	Microsoft Windows	
2021	Undungeon	Laughing Machines	Microsoft Windows, Xbox One	
2021	Trash Sailors	fluckyMachine	Microsoft Windows, Nintendo Switch	
2022	Not for Broadcast	NotGames	Microsoft Windows	
2022	Expedition Zero	Enigmatic Machines	Microsoft Windows	
2022	Hello Neighbor 2	Eerie Guest Studios	Microsoft Windows, PlayStation 4, PlayStation 5, Xbox One, Xbox Series X/S, Nintendo Switch	
2022	Tinykin	Splashteam	Microsoft Windows, Nintendo Switch, PlayStation 4, PlayStation 5, Xbox One, Xbox Series X/S	
2022	Asterigos: Curse of the Stars	Acme Gamestudio	Microsoft Windows, PlayStation 4, PlayStation 5, Xbox One, Xbox Series X/S	
2022	Despot's Game: Dystopian Battle Simulator	Konfa Games	Linux, macOS, Microsoft Windows, Nintendo Switch, PlayStation 4, PlayStation 5, Xbox One, Xbox Series X/S	
2023	RHYTHM SPROUT	SURT	Microsoft Windows, Nintendo Switch, PlayStation 4, Xbox One	
2023	Farworld Pioneers	Igloosoft	Microsoft Windows, Nintendo Switch, PlayStation 4, Xbox One	
2023	Black Skylands	Hungry Couch	Microsoft Windows, Nintendo Switch, PlayStation 4, Xbox One	
2023	The Bookwalker: Thief of Tales	DO MY BEST	macOS, Microsoft Windows, PlayStation 4, PlayStation 4, Xbox One, Xbox Series X/S	
2023	Punch Club 2: Fast Forward	Lazy Bear Games	Microsoft Windows, Nintendo Switch, PlayStation 4, Xbox One	
2023	I Am Future: Cozy Apocalypse Survival	Mandragora	Microsoft Windows, Nintendo Switch, PlayStation 5, Xbox	
2023	Hello Neighbor: Search & Rescue	Steel Wool Studios	Microsoft Windows, Meta Quest, PlayStation 4, PlayStation 5	
2023	Hello Neighbor: Nicky's Diaries	DeMagic Games	Android, iOS	
2024	Lil' Guardsman	Hilltop Studios	Microsoft Windows, Nintendo Switch, Xbox One, Xbox Series X, PlayStation 4, PlayStation 5	
2024	Tamarak Trail	Yarrow Games	Microsoft Windows, Xbox One, Xbox Series X/S, PlayStation 4, PlayStation 5, Nintendo Switch	
2024	Broken Roads	Drop Bear Bytes	Microsoft Windows, Xbox One, Xbox Series X/S, Nintendo Switch, PlayStation 4, PlayStation 5	
2024	Astor: Blade of the Monolith	C2 Game Studio	Microsoft Windows, Xbox One, Xbox Series X/S, Nintendo Switch, PlayStation 4, PlayStation 5	
2024	Rawmen	Animal	Microsoft Windows	
2024	Train Valley World	Flazm	Microsoft Windows, macOS	
2024	Divide By Sheep 2	Victor Solodilov, Denis Novikov	Microsoft Windows, iOS	
2024	Slime 3K: Rise Against Despot	Konfa Games	Microsoft Windows, MacOS, Linux, Xbox One, Xbox Series X/S, Nintendo Switch, PlayStation 4, PlayStation 5, Android	
2024	Deadside	Bad Pixel	Microsoft Windows, Xbox Series X/S, PlayStation 5	
2024	VOIN	Nikita Sozidar	Microsoft Windows	
2025	Level Zero: Extraction	DOGHOWL Games	Microsoft Windows, Xbox, PlayStation	
2025	Deep Cuts	Scythe Dev Team	Microsoft Windows, Meta Quest	
2025	Drill Core	Hungry Couch Games	Microsoft Windows	
2025	The King is Watching	Hypnohead	Microsoft Windows	
2025	Of Ash and Steel	Fire & Frost	Microsoft Windows	
2025	Kill It With Fire 2	Casey Donnellan Games LLC	Microsoft Windows, Xbox Series X/S, Playstation 5, Nintendo Switch	
2025	FEROCIOUS	OMYOG	Microsoft Windows	
2026	Hozy	Come on Games	Microsoft Windows, MacOS	
2026	All Will Fall	All Parts Connected	Microsoft Windows	
2026	SAND: Raiders of Sophie (Early Access)	Hologryph, TowerHaus	Microsoft Windows, PlayStation 5, Xbox Series X/S	
2026	Happy's Humble Burger Cult	Scythe Dev Team	Microsoft Windows	
2026	ReStory: Chill Electronics Repairs	Mandragora	Microsoft Windows, macOS	
2026	SpeedRunners 2: King of Speed	Fair Play Labs	Microsoft Windows, PlayStation 5, Xbox Series X/S, Nintendo Switch	
2026	Graveyard Keeper II	Lazy Bear Games	Microsoft Windows, Xbox Series X/S, Playstation 5, Nintendo Switch 2	
2026	Probably Stolen	Questing Goose Studio	Microsoft Windows	
2026	Hull Rupture	Konfa Games	Microsoft Windows, MacOS, Linux	
2027	The Lift	Fantastic Signals	Microsoft Windows, Playstation 5, Xbox Series X/S	
2027	Road to Jukai	Endflam	Microsoft Windows	
TBA	Hello Neighbor 3	Eerie Guest Studios, Nikita Kolesnikov	Microsoft Windows	
TBA	Trainfort	UDevLemon	Microsoft Windows	
TBA	Kingmakers	Redemption Road	Microsoft Windows	
TBA	Streets of Rogue 2	Matt Dabrowski	Microsoft Windows, MacOS, Linux	
TBA	The Crab is Walking	Hypnohead	Microsoft Windows	
