= Iron Nest =

2026 simulation video game

Iron Nest: Heavy Turret Simulator
- Developers: Nick Nieuwoudt, Dominik Latos
- Publishers: Nick Nieuwoudt, Dominik Latos
- Platform: Windows
- Release: 6 August 2026
- Genre: Simulation
- Mode: Single-player

Iron Nest: Heavy Turret Simulator (stylized in all caps) is a 2026 military simulation video game developed by Nick Nieuwoudt and Dominik Latos. Set in 1920s Castile, the game focuses on the operation of a fictional mobile gun turret, manned alone. In order to suppress a rebellion against the monarchical government, the player is provided with targets, reconnaissance information, and other intelligence to utilize in a series of missions. Players must strategize, plot bearings, and prioritize targets in order to load, aim, and fire the turret's weapons accurately and quickly.

== Synopsis ==
=== Setting ===
In an alternate history, the Iberian Peninsula sans Portugal is unified under the Kingdom of Castile and does not develop into Spain. In the 1920s, an anti-monarchist rebellion erupts throughout Castile. The rebels seize numerous cities, with the King and the royalist government forced to relocate to Aranjuez after rebels occupy the capital of Ciudad Real, and years of fighting ensue. At the behest of the head of Castile's military, a figure known as the General, a new weapon is created to break the stalemate: the Iron Nest, a 5,000-ton quadrupedal self-propelled artillery unit boasting a pair of 800mm guns taken from the battleship Alfonso XIII.

Elsewhere in Europe, World War I never occurred and the rest of the continent is at peace. The German Empire persists under Kaiser Wilhelm, and is rivaled by the British Empire and French Republic, together referred to as the Entente alliance. The Kingdom of Castile frequently accuses the French of funneling materiel and money to the Iberian republicans, but remains cordial with the British and regards Germany as an ally.

=== Plot ===
The player is the designated "Operator" of the Iron Nest, a silent protagonist. Under the General's orders, the Operator first conducts the Iron Nest's calibration by firing a shell at a Castilian civilian hospital, a false flag attack that the Castilian government propagandizes by branding it a republican terrorist bombing. Across subsequent missions spanning October 1927 to November 1928, the Iron Nest quickly proves its worth in battle and changes the tide of the civil war. Castile reclaims its lost cities and territories from the rebels, until only the city of Barcelona is left in republican hands.

In the course of Castile's campaign, the Operator is also ordered to sink a British warship, the HMS Rockingham, anchored at Gibraltar, as part of another false flag attack. The French warship Léon Gambetta is framed for the sinking, which claimed the life of the son of the First Sea Lord, and the incident strains the alliance between Britain and France to the breaking point. The German Empire takes the opportunity to invade the French territory of Alsace-Lorraine with the stated goal of re-annexing it. Britain and France reconcile to counter the German aggression, and Europe becomes embroiled in full-scale war. The upshot of these events for Castile is that the Iberian republicans cease to receive aid from the French.

The final mission takes place on November 10, 1928 and begins with the rebels cornered and defenseless in Barcelona. The Operator may complete this mission through various methods, leading to one of four different endings:

1. "A City in Celebration" – A non-lethal shell, such as a star shell or propaganda leaflet-filled shell is fired on the city. Barcelona surrenders without bloodshed and widespread celebration erupts at the peaceful end of the war.
2. "A City Subdued" – A chemical shell (either cyanogen, phosgene or tear gas) is fired on the city, forcing it into submission. It is captured and surviving pockets of resistance are weeded out.
3. "The Road Not Taken" – The Operator betrays Castile by killing the General and King, along with destroying all nearby Castilian artillery emplacements. Ten years after the event, a newspaper article explains how this unexpected action prevented a likely genocide of the republican sympathizers. It is revealed that while the rest of the world is mired in conflict, the Iberian Peninsula enjoys unity and peace, protected by additional Iron Nests.
4. "A City Silent" – An atomic shell is fired on the city, ending the civil war by eradicating all republican resistance. The General, implied to have overthrown the King in a palace coup, declares his intent to march the army of the newly-proclaimed Royal Empire of Castile north into France, to assist Germany.

== Development and release ==
Iron Nest was inspired by PVKK: Planetenverteidigungskanonenkommandant, a game by Dome Keeper (2022) developer Bippinbits that was still in development at the time of Iron Nest's release.

A demo was released on 15 June 2026 for Steam Next Fest, where it was the most popular demo, with Kotaku's Lewis Parker saying that "The worst Steam Next Fest in recorded history also somehow features the best Next Fest demo I've ever played". The game released on 6 August 2026 for Windows. After its release, the developers announced future multiplayer features, console ports, and virtual reality support.

== Reception ==
Reception

Aggregate score
Aggregator	Score
Metacritic	90/100

Review scores
Publication	Score
PCGamesN	9/10
Inven Global	8.7/10
Vandal	9.2/10
Gamereactor	9/10

Iron Nest received "universal acclaim", according to review aggregator Metacritic.

Writing for PCGamesN, Paul Kelly compared playing Iron Nest to reaching a flow state at a manual job, describing the work of mechanically operating the turret as satisfying and engrossing, and that "It makes hitting that target so much more satisfying knowing that I did everything with my own two hands". Kelly described the game as a test of the player's organizational skills and specifically complimented the implementation of the in-game notepad. Sean Martin of PC Gamer similarly described the mechanics of firing the turret as a ritual that became "strangely relaxing" with practice.

Martin further described the game as replayable, citing its procedurally generated levels and introduction of more complex systems and missions, and described it as the best artillery game they had played. Patrik Severin of Gamereactor, however, found replayability to be one of the game's flaws, commenting that players completing the campaign and skirmish modes would be left wanting more and criticized the game's reliance on performance-based medals for incentives. Severin nevertheless described Iron Nest as among the best indie games of the year.

Jaihoon Jeong, a former artilleryman writing for Inven Global, described the game as a realistic simulation of part of the labor of firing artillery, albeit one that "takes only the fun parts of what an artilleryman does and strips away all the grueling labor". Similarly, Saul Gonzalez of Vandal said that he had been a gunner for four years and described the game mechanics as realistic. Gonzalez further complimented the balance, describing the game as having found the balance of feeling demanding but not frustrating, and described the narrative as surprisingly deep.

Several reviewers, including Martin, Jeong, and Severin believed the game lacked and would be better with co-op multiplayer.

After release, Iron Nest sold over 150,000 copies on its first day, and more than 250,000 copies in three days.
