= Raccoin =

2026 video game

- Release logo
- Developer: Doraccoon
- Publisher: Playstack
- Producer: Xinya Ma (ManKemono)
- Designers: Hongpeng Luo (JoshuaRabbit)
- Artist: Ming Tang (Wolong)
- Composer: Zhengtao Pan
- Engine: Unity
- Platforms: macOS; Nintendo Switch 2; PlayStation 5; Windows; Xbox Series X/S
- Release: WW: March 31, 2026; Playtest; WW: August 18, 2026; Windows; WW: March 31, 2026; macOS; WW: October 1, 2026; PS5, Switch 2, Xbox; WW: November 10, 2026
- Genre: Roguelike
- Mode: Single-player

Raccoin: Coin Pusher Roguelike, or simply Raccoin, (Note: Chinese: 浣熊推幣機; pinyin: Huànxióng tuī bì jī; lit. 'Raccoon Coin Pusher'. "Raccoin" is stylized in all caps as "RACCOIN: Coin Pusher Roguelike.) is a 2026 coin pusher-themed roguelike video game developed by Chinese studio Doraccoon and published by Playstack. It was released for Windows on March 31, 2026, and was released on macOS in October of the same year. In Raccoin, the player must collect tickets by shooting their own coins, which can either push coins off an arcade cabinet's edge or activate special abilities. The player can purchase various types of coins with different purposes, and can purchase upgrades which change the behaviors of coins and the amount of coins the player can shoot.

Raccoin was developed in around two years, being Doraccoon's first game. Doraccoon, a Shanghai-based studio consisting of a producer, designer, and artist, was founded after its member's graduated university. The game received favorable reviews from critics for its satisfying gameplay, but was criticized for lack of engagement and its reliance on randomness.

== Gameplay ==
Many coins and prizes exist, helping fill the round's target

Raccoin is a game roguelike based on runs. The goal of each run is to complete 15 rounds. During each round, the player controls a dispenser with a certain amount of coins, trying to push other coins into a scoring area (akin to a real-life coin pusher). Coins pushed into the scoring area give the player tickets—the game's currency—and help to fulfill a set target. If the target is achieved, the round ends and the player is taken to the shop. If the player runs out of coins to dispense before they reach the target, they can exchange tickets for more. Otherwise, the run ends and the player fails.

In the shop, the player may spend tickets on upgrades and items. They can purchase special coins, expand their clip (their special coin inventory), and purchase prizes and chips. Special coins can be added during the round with different abilities, like explosion or duplication. Prizes are power-ups which the player can activate mid-round. Chips are items that give different modifiers and affect scoring. After the player finishes shopping, the next round begins.

Certain rounds may have "bad coins", which provide debuffs to the player. If all bad coins are defeated (by using abilities which "kill" them) then the player can choose between multiple new modifiers. Once a run is completed, the player can unlock new cabinets, cards, raccoons, and ticket colors, which modify future runs.

== Development ==
Raccoin was developed by the three-person Shanghai-based indie studio Doraccoon. Doraccoon was founded in 2024, by producer Xinya Ma (known online as ManKemono), artist Ming Tang (Wolong), and designer Hongpeng Luo (JoshuaRabbit). The studio received support and investment from COREBLAZER (a team created by Hypergryph, the developers of Arknights), and the game was published by Playstack. Development of the game began in July 2024, following the graduation of Doraccoon's members from the Communication University of China.

Raccoin's soundtrack was composed by artist Zhengtao Pan and the game was developed in the Unity game engine.

=== Inspiration ===
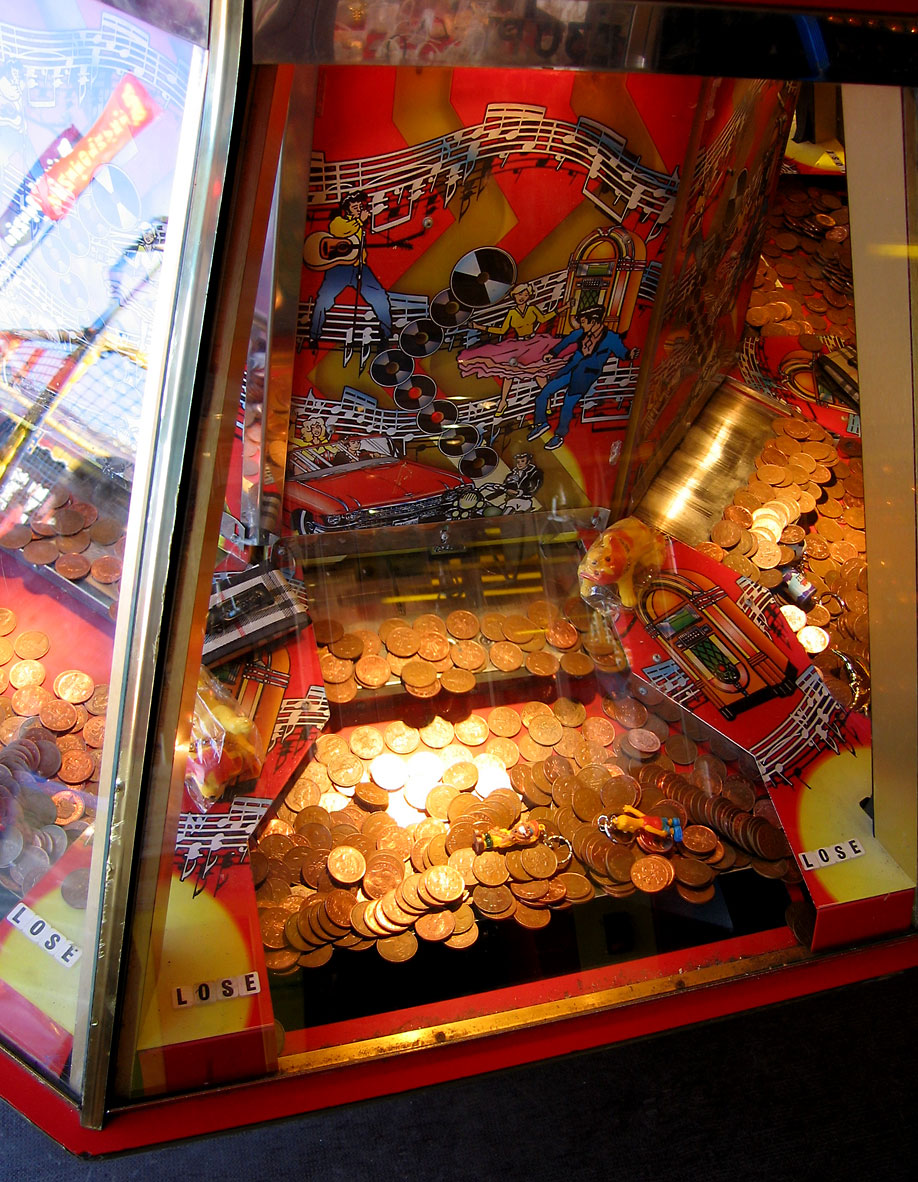
A coin pusher in a penny arcade

Raccoin is based on a coin pusher, an arcade game where the goal is to shoot coins in a machine in order to have other coins fall off an edge. In an interview with Automaton West, Raccoin's producer ManKemono said:

The idea for the game came about around the beginning of 2024. At the time, one of our team members, Wolong, took me to an arcade, where I played a coin-pusher game for the first time. I got hooked almost immediately, and for the next month or two I would play whenever I had free time.

Balatro, another game published by Playstack, served as an inspiration. In the same interview, ManKemono said the idea started by "wondering what would happen if we combined the mechanics of a coin-pusher game with a roguelike system like Balatro." The games Luck Be a Landlord and Ballionaire also served as inspiration, the former also being a major inspiration for Balatro.

== Release ==
Raccoin was announced for Windows on August 14, 2025, before releasing into an open playtest four days later on August 18. The game received attention for its similarities to Balatro, including by Ben Starr, the actor who portrayed Balatro's mascot Jimbo. A free demo released on November 10, 2025.

Raccoin officially released for Windows 10 and Windows 11 on March 31, 2026, being sold on Steam. The game sold over 100,000 copies within 24 hours of its launch. On October 1, Raccoin became available on macOS. Raccoin released for PlayStation 5, Nintendo Switch 2, and Xbox Series X and Series S on November 10, 2026 as Raccoin: Chaos Max Edition.

== Reception ==
Reception

Aggregate scores
Aggregator	Score
Metacritic	82/100
OpenCritic	81% recommend

Review score
Publication	Score
Video Games Chronicle	4/5

Raccoin received "generally favorable" reviews according to review aggregator website Metacritic. According to aggregator OpenCritic, 81% of critics recommend the game.

Reviewers praised Raccoin's addictive nature and the satisfaction of gameplay. Em Stonham, writing for Kyusai, called the game "ridiculously engrossing", and TechRaptor's Austin Suther called the game "immensely satisfying" to play. Other reviewers criticized the game's lack of engagement, especially in comparison to Balatro, with Kotaku's Zack Zwiezen saying that the "latest game to be labeled a Balatro-like isn't nearly as a engaging as that roguelike poker hit". In a review titled "Raccoin doesn't understand what makes Balatro special", Polygon's Giovanni Colantonio criticized the game, writing: "[Raccoin is] exactly like Balatro, but with the hand-crafting replaced with satisfying physics manipulation backed by ASMR-worthy coin-dropping sound effects." Siliconera's Jenni Lada criticized the game's reliance on random chance, saying "the fact that it is so RNG-related means the overall experience can feel very uneven".
