= Superfuse =

2023 video game

- Developer: Stitch Heads
- Publisher: Raw Fury
- Platform: Windows
- Release: January 31, 2023 (early access)
- Genre: Action role-playing
- Modes: Single-player, multiplayer

Superfuse was an action role-playing video game in a comic book art style. The game was released in early access on January 31, 2023, and was discontinued on October 10, 2025.

== Gameplay ==
Superfuse is an action role-playing video game in a comic book art style and superhero characters. The player hacks and slashes at enemy mobs in procedurally generated levels and upgrades their powers through a configurable skill tree as they progress.

== Development ==
Superfuse was in development by Dutch studio Stitch Heads. After a multiplayer beta test in December 2022, the game opened for early access the next month with two-character classes. It was published by Raw Fury.

The developers planned to create five-character classes and support four-player cooperative play.

As of March 2025, no update had been released for the game in over two years. On October 10, 2025, the game was delisted from Steam, remaining playable only through its singleplayer offline mode; the game's developer, Stitch Heads, had ceased operations some time prior to the delisting.
