= Kingdom Two Crowns =

2018 video game

- Promotional art
- Developers: Noio; Coatsink
- Publisher: Raw Fury
- Director: Gordon Van Dyke
- Engine: Unity
- Platforms: Windows; macOS; PlayStation 4; Nintendo Switch; Xbox One; iOS; Android
- Release: Windows, macOS, PS4, Switch, Xbox One; December 11, 2018; iOS, Android; April 28, 2020
- Genres: Strategy, management
- Modes: Single-player, multiplayer

Kingdom Two Crowns is a 2018 strategy video game developed by Thomas van den Berg and Coatsink, and published by Raw Fury. It is the third entry in the Kingdom series. Players control a mounted monarch as they attempt to defend their kingdom from a race of monsters called the Greed. The monarch can recruit villagers to perform certain jobs while building defenses such as towers and walls to fend off waves of Greed attacking the kingdom at night. Kingdom Two Crowns features single-player and cooperative multiplayer modes, with cooperative play enabling two monarchs to join via a split screen.

The developers originally designed Kingdom Two Crowns as an expansion pack for Kingdom: New Lands (2016). As the expansion grew, they decided to release it as a separate game. The series' creator, van den Berg, wanted to develop a new experience centered around defending structures. The developers chose to lessen the difficulty of the previous games' roguelike mechanics, and used a pixel art style to reduce the time between drawing and implementing new designs in gameplay.

Kingdom Two Crowns was released for Windows, macOS, PlayStation 4, Nintendo Switch, and Xbox One on December 11, 2018, and for iOS and Android on April 28, 2020. It received positive reviews, gaining praise for its strategic gameplay, artwork, and cooperative play, though its slow pace was criticized. The game attracted over 300,000 players within six months of launch, and was supported by Raw Fury with several updates and downloadable content.

== Gameplay ==
Two monarchs in split-screen multiplayer, one (top) exploring and the other (bottom) inside the kingdom

Kingdom Two Crowns is a 2D (Note: Creator Thomas van den Berg referred to the level design as "one-dimensional".) strategy and resource management game presented from a side-scrolling perspective. Players control a mounted monarch who must build their kingdom and defend it from the Greed, a race of monsters. Gameplay takes place across a day–night cycle, the monarch exploring and building during the day and fighting the Greed at night. Expansion is facilitated by spending gold coins, which the monarch collects and stores inside a bag. Camps where the monarch can spend coins to hire new subjects are located outside the kingdom. Once recruited, villagers remain idle until the monarch buys equipment for them, leading them to perform a specific job. Typical hires include builders who clear land and construct defenses, farmers who grow crops for gold, and archers who hunt animals for coins and attack enemies.

The kingdom is located in the center of the procedurally generated level, and at night, the Greed attack it from the left and right. Monarchs have no means of self-defense, but can spend coins to build walls, construct towers, and hire archers to hold off the increasing waves of enemies. If the villagers are not protected by walls, the Greed can steal their coins and equipment, and they must be recruited again. Furthermore, the Greed can take coins from the monarch, and if the player has no remaining coins, the Greed can steal the monarch's crown, causing a game over. Unlike previous Kingdom games, the kingdom is not destroyed if the crown is lost. Instead, the player continues as a new monarch called the "heir", who inherits a partially destroyed version of the player's previous realm.

As the monarch explores, they can encounter portals that spawn Greed and treasure chests containing coins or gems. The player uses gems to purchase upgrades for the kingdom, such as mounts that the monarch can ride on, hermits who can be hired to make new buildings, or statues that provide benefits for subjects. Each level has a shipwreck that the monarch can repair, allowing for passage between five island levels. As the monarch expands their kingdom across the islands, they can discover and unlock new technologies that allow for the construction of better defenses and buildings. Eventually, the technological improvements allow the monarch to create a bomb to destroy the source of the Greed, a portal located at the far end of each level. The monarch must assemble an army to attack and destroy the portal; their goal is the extermination of the Greed on all five islands.

Kingdom Two Crowns can be played in single-player mode, or through cooperative multiplayer (co-op), in which two monarchs can join via a split screen. In co-op, both players act independently, and can share their coins by throwing them at each other. If one player loses their monarch's crown, they lose the ability to build, but can continue collecting coins for the other player. The game only ends if both players lose their crowns.

== Development ==
Kingdom Two Crowns was developed by the Kingdom franchise creator Thomas "Noio" van den Berg and British game studio Coatsink. The game was originally intended to be an expansion pack for Kingdom: New Lands (2016), an updated version of the 2015 video game Kingdom. As the expansion grew and experienced delays, the designers chose to develop it as a new game. In contrast to the other Kingdom games, Two Crowns was mainly designed by a co-founder of Raw Fury, Gordon Van Dyke, with van den Berg acting as a creative director. Both developers wanted to create a new experience focused on defending structures instead of "defeating and escaping". They were inspired by the narrative of Infinity Blade (2010) to reduce the difficulty of the original Kingdom's roguelike design. As a result, the developers allowed the player to keep most of their buildings after losing their crown, believing that it would encourage them to keep playing.

Van Dyke described the art of Two Crowns as "modern pixel art aesthetics. Inspired by retro video games, but without the limitations of that era". Van den Berg liked the style for its impressionism, and chose it because it could be quickly produced, despite having some trouble designing the fonts and rotating images. The level design was particularly difficult, as van den Berg found that the "one-dimensional" layout limited player strategy. Although he was previously opposed to adding a new currency, the rest of the team convinced van den Berg to add gems, without complicating the existing gameplay.

In 2019, van den Berg sold the rights to the Kingdom franchise to Raw Fury for an undisclosed fee. He had been transitioning control of the series to Raw Fury over the course of three years, and decided to begin working on other projects. Van Dyke became the new manager of the franchise, after working as a designer on the previous games. By then, the series had sold over four million copies, and Kingdom Two Crowns had gained over 300,000 players within six months of launch. Raw Fury created a franchise "roadmap" for upcoming expansions and games. The studio said in 2020 that supporting Two Crowns was one of their main priorities, and they would be providing it with further content updates. Van Dyke left Raw Fury in March 2025 to work on his game studio, Stumpy Squid, and Raw Fury retained control over the franchise.

== Marketing and release ==
Kingdom Two Crowns was teased at PAX West in 2017, where the developers demonstrated the new multiplayer system. Raw Fury displayed a demo at the Game Developers Conference in March 2018, and announced the release date in November alongside free downloadable content (DLC) called Kingdom Two Crowns: Shogun. The developers said that Shogun was the first of several "campaign settings", which would all contain new environments, strategies and characters. The Shogun setting was Japan-themed, and allowed for players to recruit new units such as ninjas. Kingdom Two Crowns was released alongside the Shogun DLC on December 11, 2018, for Windows, macOS, PlayStation 4, Nintendo Switch, and Xbox One.

An update introducing "Challenge Islands" was released on September 2, 2019, adding three new islands and a mount. Versions for iOS and Android were released on April 28, 2020 alongside another free setting, Kingdom: Dead Lands. The update included a crossover with the 2019 Metroidvania game Bloodstained: Ritual of the Night, allowing players to switch between four Bloodstained-themed monarchs possessing their own unique abilities. The setting was conceived after the developers met Bloodstained publisher 505 Games at an indie game convention, and were inspired to create a campaign similar in design to a Halloween event that occurred annually in Kingdom: New Lands.

A further free update dubbed "Never Alone" was released on April 20, 2021, introducing co-op to the Challenge Islands and adding a new island called "Trade Routes". Paid DLC, Kingdom Two Crowns: Norse Lands, developed by Raw Fury and Gordon Van Dyke, (Note: Developed under Stumpy Squid) was released on November 16 alongside a free patch. The DLC added a new campaign, a type of Greed, and Norse-themed jobs and mounts. The soundtrack for Norse Lands was composed by the Norwegian alt-pop group Kalandra, the composers drawing heavily upon Scandinavian and Celtic influences and using instruments such as the hurdy-gurdy and moraharpa. A new game mode, "Lost Islands", was introduced on January 23, 2023. The mode allows players to procedurally generate a random Challenge Island on a daily basis, and gives them a 72-hour time limit to complete it. In May 2024, another DLC, Kingdom Two Crowns: Call of Olympus, was announced for a later release. The expansion launched on October 8, 2024, adding new recruitable units such as hoplites and slingers, and useful blessings from the Greek gods earned by completing tasks. Raw Fury announced a new DLC, Kingdom Two Crowns: Pharaoh Lands, which is set to release in 2026 and adds features inspired by Ancient Egypt.

== Reception ==
Reception

Aggregate score
Aggregator	Score
Metacritic	Switch: 85/100

Review scores
Publication	Score
GameStar	81/100
Nintendo Life	8/10
Nintendo World Report	9/10
Push Square	7/10

According to the review aggregate website Metacritic, the Switch version of Kingdom Two Crowns received "generally favorable reviews". Critics frequently praised the strategic elements of gameplay. Nintendo World Report called the game a worthy sequel to Kingdom, and recommended it to fans of the strategy genre; Push Square and Pocket Tactics described its mechanics as simple and well-designed. GameStar praised the minimalism in how the monarch was controlled, and found its strategy elements to be "amazingly complex". Other critics considered the game substantially similar to Kingdom: New Lands, but said that it was generally better in comparison.

Critics praised the introduction of co-op, feeling it made the gameplay easier. Nintendo Life considered co-op a helpful addition, but said players may feel like they were gaming the system after performing worse on their own. Nintendo World Report noted that adding a second monarch allowed players to split their attention between several areas, calling it a powerful and creative enhancement. GameRevolution said that the cooperative mode encouraged players to win in an "exploitative way", and undermined the original Kingdom's atmosphere by forcing the player to adopt an overly strategic approach. The reviewer felt that allowing monarchs to share tasks removed the stress of gameplay, which he believed was central to the appeal of the franchise.

Reviewers such as Push Square and Nintendo Life said the pacing was sedate and would not appeal to everyone. Kotaku felt that the slow pace suited the game world, but might become frustrating when a player has to rebuild after a setback. Other commentators found the lack of direct control over the villagers annoying, although Pocket Tactics said that this did not fully detract from the experience. Journalists frequently highlighted Two Crown's art style and themes. Nintendo World Report and Nintendo Life singled out the pixel art as captivating, Nintendo Life also highlighting how the scenery changed from day to night, saying that it would win over players with its tranquility. Similarly, Pocket Tactics's reviewer appreciated how the in-game progression reminded him of medieval rulers expanding their domains, and wrote that Two Crowns's combination of simplistic strategy with an aesthetic feel amounted to "a really smart kingdom management game".
