= Esoteric Ebb =

2026 video game

- Publisher: Raw Fury
- Designer: Christoffer Bodegård
- Programmers: Christoffer Bodegård; Tobias Löf Melker; Valgarður Ragnheiðar Ívarsson
- Artists: Oscar Westberg; Gibbet Games
- Writer: Christoffer Bodegård
- Composers: Anders Bach; Brian Batz; Kristian Paulsen
- Engine: Unity
- Platform: Windows
- Release: March 3, 2026
- Genre: Role-playing game
- Mode: Single-player

Esoteric Ebb is a role-playing video game developed by Christoffer Bodegård and published by Raw Fury, released for Windows on March 3, 2026. The game is unofficially based on a Dungeons & Dragons campaign, but played out similar to Disco Elysium where instead of using combat to resolve conflict, the player engages in dialog with non-player characters and makes skill checks against their inner voices, representing their six major attributes. In the game, the player controls the "world's worst cleric", after they wake up from some incident that they do not remember. They learn that their task is to uncover the reason for the explosion of a tea shop in the city of Norvik, five days before a major election.

== Gameplay ==
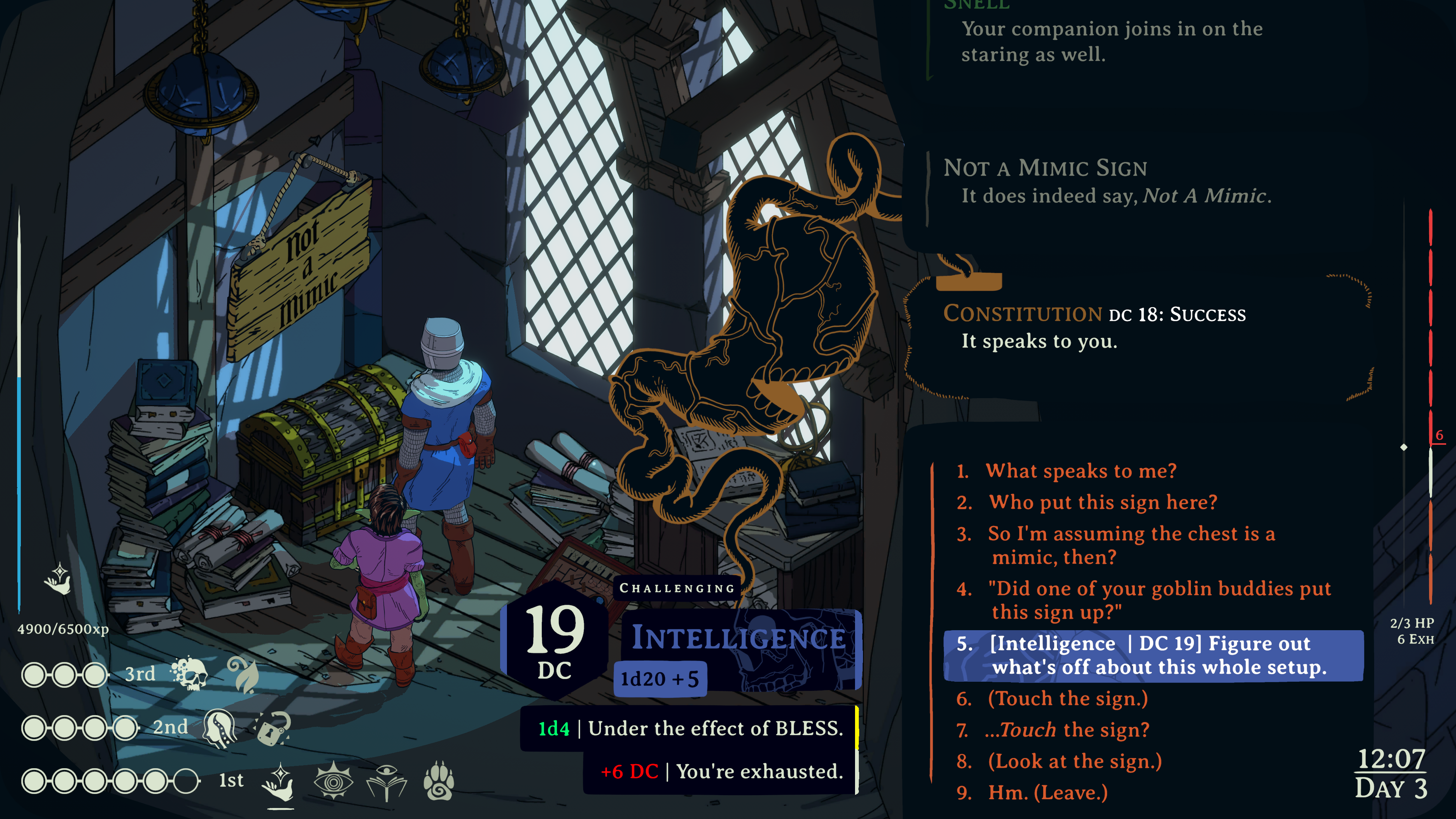
A view of a dialog tree, showing the player character engaged in discussion with the inner voice of one of their attributes, Constitution

The game is presented in an isometric view with the player moving the cleric between points of interest, including non-player characters (NPCs) to initiate dialog. The cleric also engages with inner dialog by the voices of six attributes, Strength, Dexterity, Intelligence, Wisdom, Constitution, and Charisma. These dialog trees can lead to skill checks, where the player rolls a 20-sided die to resolve, boosted by attributes and bonuses granted by equipment they have gained. Other factors of the games, such as spells and recovery, are derived from the 5th edition of Dungeons & Dragons (D&D) rules.

== Story ==
=== Setting ===
The game takes place within a disc-shaped pocket dimension known as the Esoteric Coast, created approximately 5,000 years in the past by Jor, a powerful wizard who sought to create a perfect artificial universe. Jor ushered various creatures from different dimensions through portals into the Coast to populate it, but was eventually forced to close them when gods of other universes attempted to gain control over the Coast. The disc is separated into equally-sized slices known as the Eight Bands, with Jor's Ocean in its center. The Coast is marked by constant magical phenomena, or "esoteric events", that change the nature of reality in unpredictable ways, though these become more intense in unpopulated areas and closer to the center of the world.

Closer to the time the story takes place, the world is recovering from the Coast War, an immense magical conflict that claimed millions of lives. "Magocracy" (rule by magicians), once the dominant form of government, fell to ruin and became only a fringe faction.

=== Plot ===
The protagonist, Ragn Hemlin, a human cleric with unusual arcane proficiency, nearly drowns in a river and experiences an esoteric event in which the now-dead Jor speaks to him. He awakens in a nearby morgue in the city-state of Norvik after being rescued by fishermen. Entering the city proper, he meets Snell, a goblin who informs him of his assignment to investigate the explosion of a tea shop. The explosion threatens to inflame tensions between humans (represented by the city's magistrate, Nicholas Darrow) and goblins (represented by Lady Sageleaf, the leader of the most powerful goblin faction, the Halfway Bridge Tribe, and secretly a dragon in goblin form), on the eve of the city's first election. Ragn partners with Snell and investigates the shop, discovering a dead elf and realizing that the main witness to the event, "Frank, son of Frank", fled into the ancient catacombs beneath the city.

Ragn descends beneath Norvik, potentially with the assistance of Snell and Ettir, an angel under Darrow's employ. Fighting through various monsters, Ragn rescues "Frank" in the Undercoast far beneath the city, revealing him to be Meriadoc Moonwatch, a major figure in the Freestrider democratic faction. Ragn realizes that Meriadoc did not commit the crime, but the actual culprit escaped into the Pillar of Jor, a mysterious and massive magical artifact the city was built around. Gaining the assistance of one of several powerful magicians, Ragn enters the Pillar and winds up in a space between dimensions. There, he finds Lord Gorm, a powerful paladin. Gorm believed the Freestriders were corrupt and would destroy the Party of Norvik unless he resurrected Urth, the state god of Norvik. He attempted to buy a destructive fireball necklace from an elf, Pinja, inside the tea shop in order to turn the election into a human sacrifice that would bring back Urth, but the deal went bad and she attempted to kill him with the necklace, though he was able to escape.

Gorm tries to recruit Ragn to complete the plan, but Ragn refuses. Ragn attempts to talk Gorm down, and causes him to commit suicide in regret of his deeds. Afterwards, Urth himself thanks Ragn for stopping Gorm's plan to resurrect him and explains the circumstances of his past. Urth, content to remain in purgatory, bids farewell to Ragn and sends him back. The mystery solved and the city safe, Ragn votes in the election, though the results are left unknown.

== Development ==
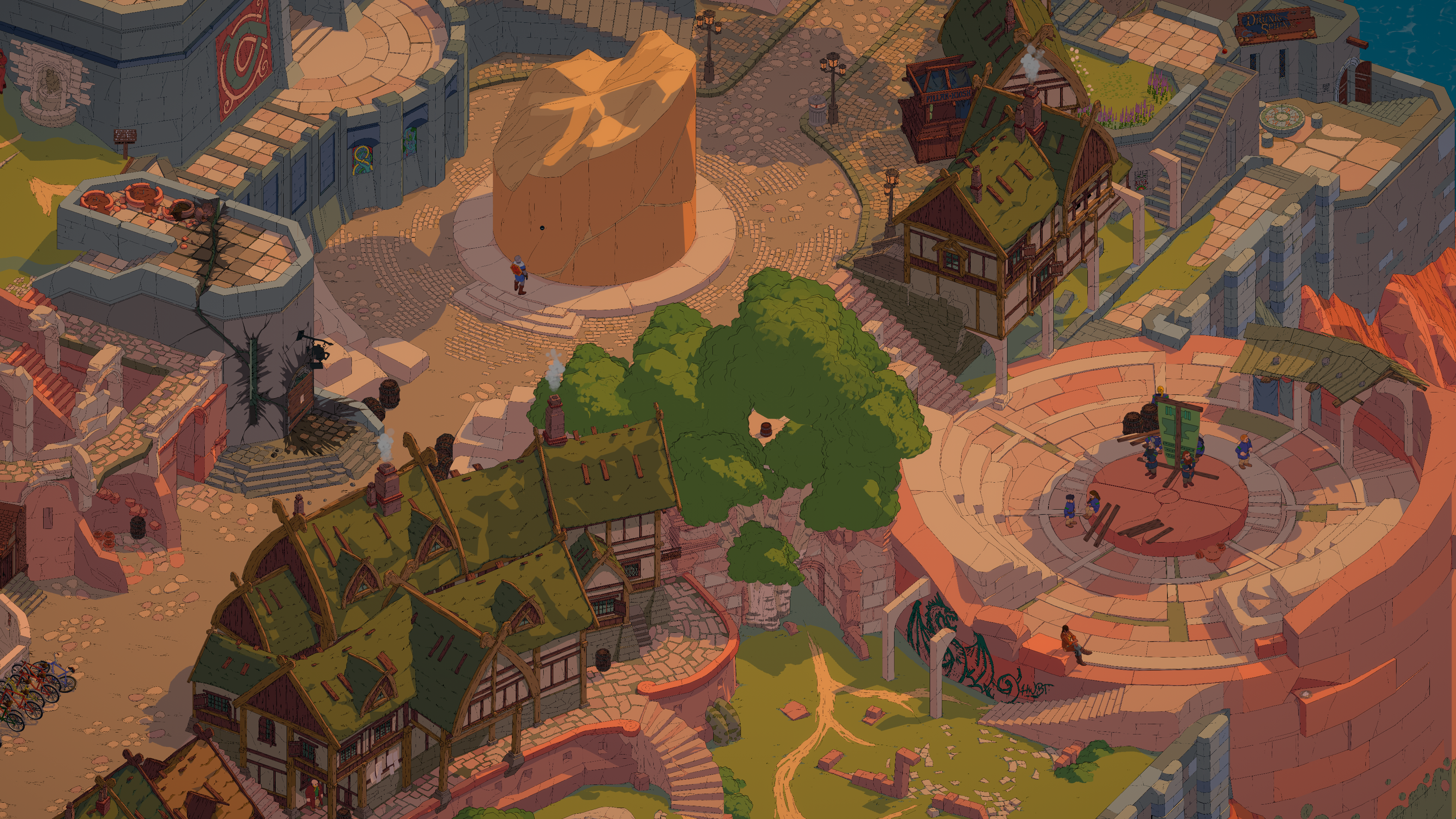
A view of the map

Esoteric Ebb was developed by Swedish developer Christoffer Bodegård in Unity, with the dialogues being written in the open source scripting language Ink. He had been inspired by D&D campaigns he and his friends had played, putting together first a design document for his ideal RPG, and then setting out to actually develop it even though he knew the scope was large. After about four years he had completed enough to know his approach to exploration and social interactions were in place, but was struggling with combat, and decided to put the project down. About three months later, in 2019, Disco Elysium was released, which was an RPG that lacked combat but instead resolved conflicts through skill checks. Bodegård recognized this approach would fit with his concept, and spent about a month and a half playing Disco Elysium to research for his game, inspired by the approach to writing and its non-linear structure.

By 2022, Bodegård had prototypes that he felt had come together, and teased the game within Disco Elysium forums to get feedback, where while generally positive, cautioned him that it looked too similar to Disco Elysium. He crafted a demo, released in early 2024, to seek interest. A review of the demo by PC Gamer led to the game being picked up by Raw Fury, helping Bodegård to cover his living expenses and outsource freelance artists from a local incubator to help create the game's assets. That allowed Bodegård to focus on the writing and dialog, trying to make a humorous game that still focused on serious themes, such as the moral and legal implication of a "Charm Person" spell. Bodegård estimated that by the end of development, he had written over 1.25 million words for the game, 300,000 words by an early prototype, and the remaining in creating the full game.

== Reception ==
Reception

Aggregate scores
Aggregator	Score
Metacritic	85/100
OpenCritic	100% recommend

Review scores
Publication	Score
Eurogamer	4/5
GameSpot	9/10
Hardcore Gamer	4.5/5
PC Gamer (US)	90/100
RPGamer	4/5
RPGFan	83/100

Esoteric Ebb received "generally favorable" reviews from critics, according to the review aggregation website Metacritic. Fellow review aggregator OpenCritic assessed that the game received "mighty" approval, being recommended by 100% of critics.

=== Awards ===
Year	Award	Category	Result	Ref.
2026	Golden Joystick Awards 2026	Best Indie Game	Nominated	
2026	Golden Joystick Awards 2026	PC Game of the Year	Nominated	
2026	The Game Awards 2026	Best Debut Indie Game	Pending	
