= The Séance of Blake Manor =

2025 video game

- Developer: Spooky Doorway
- Publisher: Raw Fury
- Producers: Amber Thompson; Treasa McCabe
- Designer: Treasa McCabe
- Programmer: Treasa McCabe
- Artist: Paul Conway
- Writers: Dave McCabe; Darcy Little; Leia French
- Composer: Clement Panchout
- Platforms: Linux; Windows; Nintendo Switch 2; PlayStation 5; Xbox Series X/S
- Release: Linux, Windows; October 27, 2025; Switch 2, PS5, Xbox Series X/S; October 27, 2026
- Genres: Puzzle, adventure
- Mode: Single-player

The Séance of Blake Manor is a first-person puzzle game developed by the Spooky Doorway and published by Raw Fury. It was released for Linux and Windows on October 27, 2025. Ports for Nintendo Switch 2, PlayStation 5 and Xbox Series X/S were released on the first anniversary of the game on October 27, 2026.

== Plot ==
Private detective Declan Ward receives an anonymous letter imploring him to come to Blake Manor, an isolated manor-turned-hotel in Connemara, to investigate the disappearance of a guest, Evelyn Deane.

Arriving at the manor, Ward discovers that a seance is due to take place there in two days, organised by the manor's owner, Marquess Jonathan Blake, who recently lost his wife in an accident that left his son and heir Walter in a wheelchair. The manager tells Ward that Deane has departed on her own, citing a letter she apparently left, but Ward discovers that it is a forgery; there is foul play involved.

The initially sceptical Ward soon becomes more and more aware of the presence of the paranormal within the manor: ghosts are a frequent sight, and many of the guests and staff practice magic openly. Further, he discovers that the door to Deane's hotel room has been hidden by magical means, and that the guests and staff are slowly forgetting the details of Deane's stay or even that she was there at all. He deduces that a sigil drawn under her bed by the culprit caused Deane to wander the halls in a daze; he follows her trail to the manor's hedge maze, where he has a vision of her being guided there by a massive shadowy figure.

Ward attends a masked ball organised by Marquess Blake, but is unaware of the event's main draw: the wine all the guests drank had been dosed with a powerful hallucinogen. While delirious, seeing the ballroom as a otherworldly realm and the guests as nightmarish creatures, Ward nevertheless manages to spot a masked individual incapacitating and capturing another guest. He gives chase, but loses their trail in the hedge maze, where he once again encounters the huge shadowy figure before passing out.

Waking up the next day, Ward discovers that the only missing person, and thus the one who was kidnapped, is Domhnall O'Finn, a druid. He finds a sigil similar to the one under Deane's bed in O'Finn's room and deduces that he was to be the culprit's next target, but was abducted early because he recognised his kidnapper at the ball. Further, he finds that O'Finn and Deane both descend from lineages of powerful Milesians, which is likely the reason for them being targeted.

Ward performs research in the library and concludes that the shadowy figure haunting the manor is Goibniu, an old Irish deity who was bound to the grounds by the ancient Milesian rulers and wants to return home to Tír na nÓg. Ward deduces that Goibniu is also responsible for shared disturbing dreams experienced by the guests and staff.

Sneaking into the manor's basement, Ward discovers that the one who hired him was housekeeper Caitlin Joyce. She desperately wants him to solve the mystery, and gathers all of the staff to meet with Ward. The staff agree to secretly grant Ward access to the Blake residence to investigate further. During the meeting, the staff, strangely, speak in unison when talking about Walter, the Marquess' son, but do not realise it themselves, showing they are under some kind of mental suggestion.

Investigating the Blake residence, Ward discovers that Marquess Blake is obsessed with resurrecting his dead wife and intends to sacrifice his son during the seance to achieve this end. Additionally, he encounters evidence signifying that the Blakes are also descended from a Milesian lineage. Hiding inside a closet, Ward observes Joyce and Marquess Blake doting on Walter, however, when they turn around, he sees that the wheelchair they are speaking to is empty. Investigating further, he discovers that all of the paintings around the manor seemingly depicting Walter are elaborate forgeries; Walter Blake does not exist, and is some sort of mass hallucination experienced by the residents.

Ward arrives at the seance just in time. Instead of summoning a spirit, as intended, the seance seemingly opens a portal to Tír na nÓg, causing many malicious Fey to descend on the seance site. Depending on the actions the player took in the preceding three days, most of the manor's residents can be saved from the fey if their own personal mysteries are solved, whereupon they either decide not to attend the seance or are protected during it by a supernatural force.

Ward notices the culprit running away again and gives chase, tracking them to a magical statue that requires speaking the culrpit's name to allow passage. At this point, Ward has enough clues to indict a single culprit: jeweller Simon Coventry, who seems to be hiding some sort of connection to Deane and has mysteriously instructed in his will that all his wordly assets should be left to Walter Blake.

Descending into Coventry's lair, he encounters evidence that lets him piece together Coventry's motive: he is, in reality, Henry Blake, the rightful owner of the manor and Marquess Blake's cousin. The Marquess' father cheated Henry's father out of his birthright to the land and title, and the young Henry was forced to flee and assume a new identity. Harboring a grudge, he secretly returned to the manor several decades later and discovered Goibniu's resting place beneath the manor's church. Using a painting of himself as a child, he induced Goibniu to dream Walter Blake into the collective consciousness of the manor's inhabitants. He intends to use the blood of the descendants of the Milesians who trapped Goibniu on the manor grounds - Marquess Blake, O'Finn and Deane - to free the deity and use its power to transform into his younger self, claiming Walter Blake's identity and birthright.

Ward descends into Goibniu's tomb just in time to see Henry praying to the slumbering deity; he finds Deane and O'Finn unconscious inside vats draining their blood into a pool below Goibniu. A dazed Marquess Blake is about to attack Ward, but he tells him Henry's plan and reveals the truth about his son. Marquess Blake, enraged, wrestles with Henry and they both fall into the pool, dying; with this, the blood of the third Milesian lineage has been added and Goibniu is able to be freed.

The player is given the freedom to choose Goibniu's fate: if the portal leading to Tír na nÓg is opened fully, letting Goibniu return to his home, the fey overwhelm the manor, killing everyone, including Ward, and presumably dooming humanity. If the player decides to close the portal, keeping Goibniu trapped, or decides to kill Goibniu's physical body, the fey are banished and the manor's surviving residents, including Deane and O'Finn, are saved.

Some time later, Deane meets Ward at a bar and thanks him for saving her life. In a post-credits scene, Deane conducts a seance for Ward to summon the ghost of his deceased brother Eamonn and give him closure.

== Gameplay ==
The player controls Ward from a first-person perspective. The primary objective is to solve the mystery by exploring the manor and interrogating its guests. A key gameplay element involves time management, as each action consumes a specific amount of in-game time. Furthermore, certain events occur in predetermined locations at fixed times and characters follow individual schedules that determine their whereabouts throughout the day. The art style follows a comic book aesthetic, while the setting draws inspiration from Irish mythology and the spiritualist movements of the Victorian era.

== Development ==
The game was developed by Irish independent studio Spooky Doorway and published by Raw Fury.

During development, it was referred to as Eldritch House on their official discord server where they shared art progress for the game. Following the official announcement, the name of this channel was renamed to reflect the game's current title. A promotional trailer released under the original name has since been removed from YouTube.

== Reception ==
Reception

Aggregate scores
| Aggregator | Score |
|---|---|
| Metacritic | 89/100 |
| OpenCritic | 95% recommend |

Review scores
| Publication | Score |
|---|---|
| GamesRadar+ | 4.5/5 |
| Nintendo Life | 9/10 |
| PC Gamer (US) | 87/100 |
| The Guardian | 5/5 |

The Séance of Blake Manor received "generally favorable" reviews from critics, according to the review aggregator website Metacritic. Aggregator OpenCritic determined that 95% of critics recommended the game.

Critics drew favorable comparisons to Blue Prince and praised several aspects of the gameplay, particularly the time-management mechanic. Writing for GamesRadar+, Oscar Taylor-Kent stated that "it really makes the investigation feel tangible".

The game's writing also received widespread acclaim. Giovanni Colantonio of Polygon described it as "exceptional writing that really makes the mystery work", while Kerry Brunskill of PC Gamer commended the diverse cast of the characters.
