= Bad North =

2018 strategy video game

- Developer: Plausible Concept
- Publisher: Raw Fury
- Platforms: Windows, Nintendo Switch, PlayStation 4, Xbox One, iOS, Android
- Release: August 20, 2018: Switch; WW: August 20, 2018 PS4, Xbox One; WW: August 28, 2018 Windows; WW: October 16, 2018 Android, iOS; WW: October 16, 2019
- Genre: Real-time strategy
- Mode: Single-player

Bad North is a real-time strategy video game developed by Swedish studio Plausible Concept and published by Raw Fury. The game was released on August 20, 2018, for the Nintendo Switch, then for PlayStation 4 and Xbox One on August 28. A Microsoft Windows version was released on October 16, 2018. Versions for Android and iOS followed on October 16, 2019.

== Gameplay ==
Bad North focuses on real-time tactics gameplay. The player is tasked with defending their kingdom from invading Vikings. The procedurally generated islands are divided into multiple tiles and have houses with Vikings attacking from any corner, so the player's strategy must be well planned to get the opportunity to save the people from the enemy by protecting the houses. The Viking invaders will chuck torches into the houses, and if they burn completely, the player will not earn coins for those houses. Coins are needed for upgrades to units and to level up commanders' defenses. The player can pick up items (represented as question marks in the map) and add commanders to the army.

The game offers Easy, Normal, and Hard difficulty options. A "Very Hard" option can be unlocked by completing the game on Hard. A free expansion for Bad North called "Jotunn Edition" was released in July 2019.

== Reception ==
Reception

Aggregate score
Aggregator	Score
Metacritic	NS: 72/100; PC: 74/100; XONE: 65/100

Review scores
Publication	Score
Destructoid	5.5/10
Nintendo Life	9/10
Nintendo World Report	7/10
Official Xbox Magazine (US)	7/10
PC Gamer (US)	78/100

Bad North received "mixed or average reviews" according to Metacritic. The game was nominated for "Strategy/Simulation Game of the Year" at the 22nd Annual D.I.C.E. Awards.
