= Kathy Rain =

2016 point-and-click adventure video game

- Developer: Clifftop Games
- Publisher: Raw Fury
- Engine: Adventure Game Studio
- Platforms: Windows; macOS; Android; iOS; Nintendo Switch
- Release: Windows, macOS; 5 May 2016; Android, iOS; 23 November 2016; The Director's Cut; Windows, macOS, Android, iOS, Switch; 26 October 2021
- Genre: Point-and-click adventure
- Mode: Single-player

Kathy Rain is a point-and-click adventure video game developed by Clifftop Games and published by Raw Fury. The game is set in 1995 and follows a college girl named Kathy who returns to her hometown to look into a mystery related to her recently deceased grandfather while confronting her troubled past.

A sequel, Kathy Rain 2: Soothsayer, was released in 2025.

== Plot ==
In 1995, Kathy Rain, a college student studying journalism, returns to her fictional hometown of Conwell Springs after she learns of the passing of her paternal grandfather Joseph. At the funeral, she immediately reconnects with her grandmother, whom she has not seen since she was a child. Shortly after the funeral, Kathy's grandmother explains that an incident involving Joseph had left him in a vegetative state without any medical explanation. Curious, Kathy decides to probe deeper into what happened to her grandfather.

In town, Kathy finds a tape from Joseph in the police archives and gets involved in a case he himself had been investigating - a child prodigy painter named Lily Myers who drowned in 1975 in an apparent suicide, most of her artwork having been stolen right after it was acquired by art collector Charles Wade, whom was also one of Joseph's colleagues in the USAF. In addition, Kathy also encounters an old overdeveloped photograph concerning three strange lights (resembling the will-o'-the-wisps) as well as a red flower, which Kathy later learns to be the Red Scythe, an endangered species of flowers known to cause hallucinations as a side effect.

Investigations into both leads both point to the local Church of the Holy Trinity - whose symbol is very alike the three strange lights in Joseph's picture - where Kathy suspects the local priest, Father Isaac, is running a cult utilizing the Red Scythes to influence people like Joseph and Lily. At the same time, Kathy's college roommate Eileen Summers arrives to try and aid in the investigation, but is then caught by Isaac while trying to infiltrate the Church. Learning of this and in spite of being arrested in an attempted invasion, Kathy manages to escape imprisonment, rescue Eileen and knock down and expose Isaac for kidnapping as well as his involvement in the robbery of Lily's paintings. However, Eileen is left in a catatonic state, similar to what happened to Joseph.

Confronting Isaac in jail, Kathy learns of Isaac's involvement with the Crimson One - a bald man in a red suit who had been influencing people over the years as well as appearing frequently in Kathy's dreams and visions. The Crimson One had also been frequently visiting Lily, and it's eventually revealed she started rejecting her gifts for painting, culminating in her committing suicide by proxy via her brother Nathan. Kathy visits Nathan, asking him more on the matter, and he guides her to a particular deep pit within Conwell Woods, surrounded by red scythes, where she finds the Crimson One and proceeds down into the pit, determined to save Eileen.

The bottom of the pit proves to be a supernatural hellish plane where visitors are forced to confront their pasts and sources of misery. Kathy herself is forced to come to terms with her hatred for her parents - her father abandoned her at birth, she had to commit her mother to a mental institution and went through an abortion when she got pregnant. She is eventually guided by an apparition of Lily to meet with Joseph, who instructs Kathy to burn all the red scythes to sever the connection from the supernatural world with the reality above. The two bid farewell, but not before Joseph tells Kathy that he's proud of her for the remarkable courage she has shown throughout this entire journey. Kathy returns to the surface and sets the entire meadow ablaze. She heads back to find Eileen no longer comatose, and learns that Isaac had hanged himself while in prison.

The next morning, Kathy and Eileen bid farewell to Joseph at his grave one last time. Kathy remarks that they had made a pretty good investigative team, and teases Eileen to not get kidnapped next time. Eileen ignores this, excited at the prospect that there will be a "next time".

== Development and release ==
Kathy Rain was developed by Clifftop Games, a one-man Swedish indie studio founded by Joel Staaf Hästö. Hästö called the television series Twin Peaks an influence for the game. The game was developed using the Adventure Game Studio development tool. The game was showcased at Gamescom in 2015. The game was published by Raw Fury and released for Windows and macOS on 5 May 2016, alongside a demo. The game was later released for Android and iOS on 23 November 2016. In early 2021, a director's cut for the game was announced, and was released for Windows, macOS, Android, iOS and Nintendo Switch on 26 October 2021.

== Reception ==
Reception

Aggregate score
Aggregator	Score
Metacritic	PC: 77/100

Review scores
Publication	Score
Polygon	6.5/10
TouchArcade	iOS: 4.5/5

Kathy Rain was received favourably by video game critics. Despite the game's initial sales being underwhelming, publisher Raw Fury vowed to continue supporting the developer.

== See also ==
- Whispers of a Machine, Clifftop Games' next game
