= Medal game =

Arcade game

- Developers: Sega, Konami, Namco, Taito
- Publisher: Various
- Platform: Arcade
- Release: 1970s (Japan)
- Genres: Coin pusher, Slot machine, Redemption game
- Modes: Single-player, multiplayer

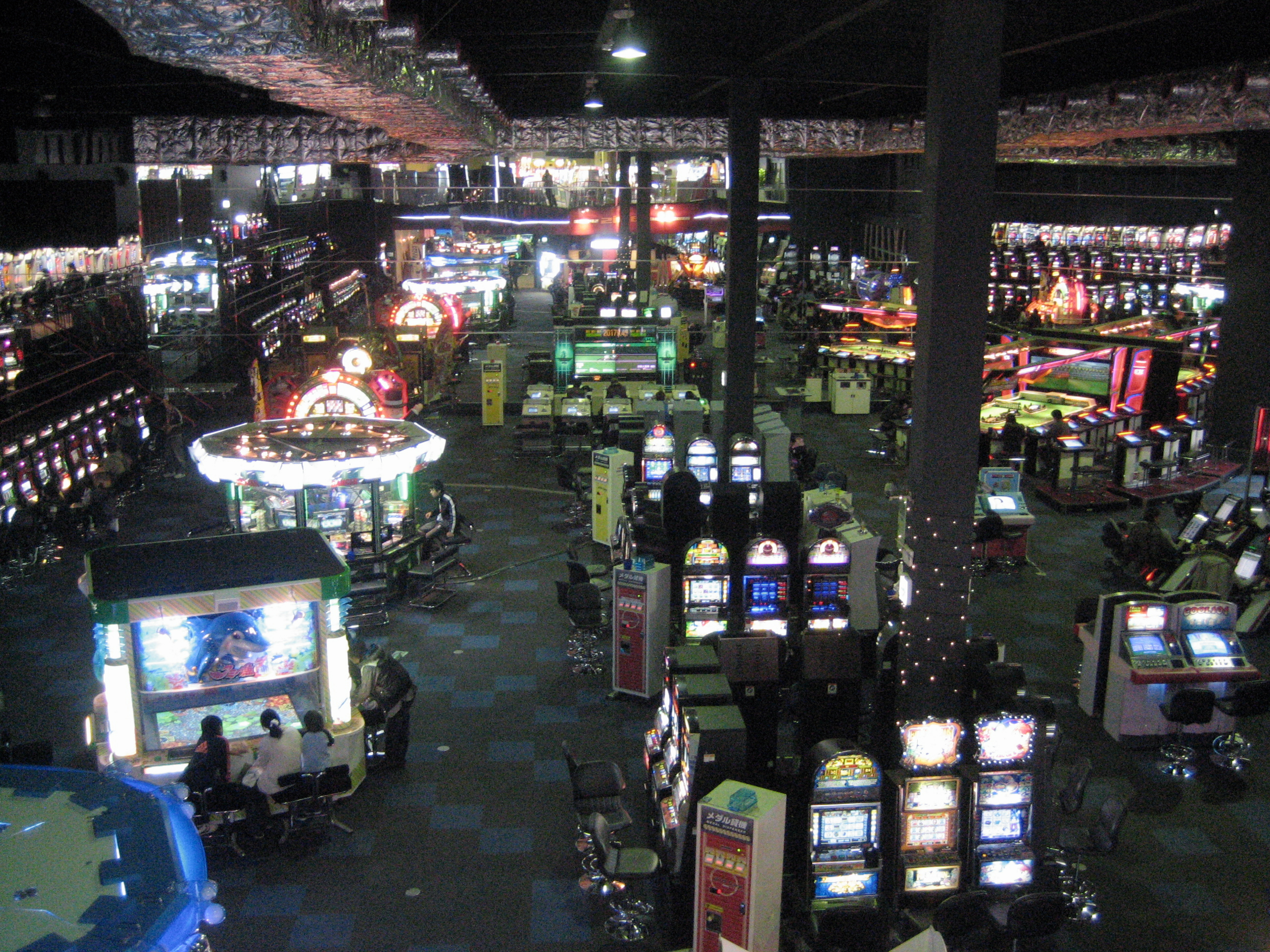
An example of an amusement arcade in Japan dedicated to medal games

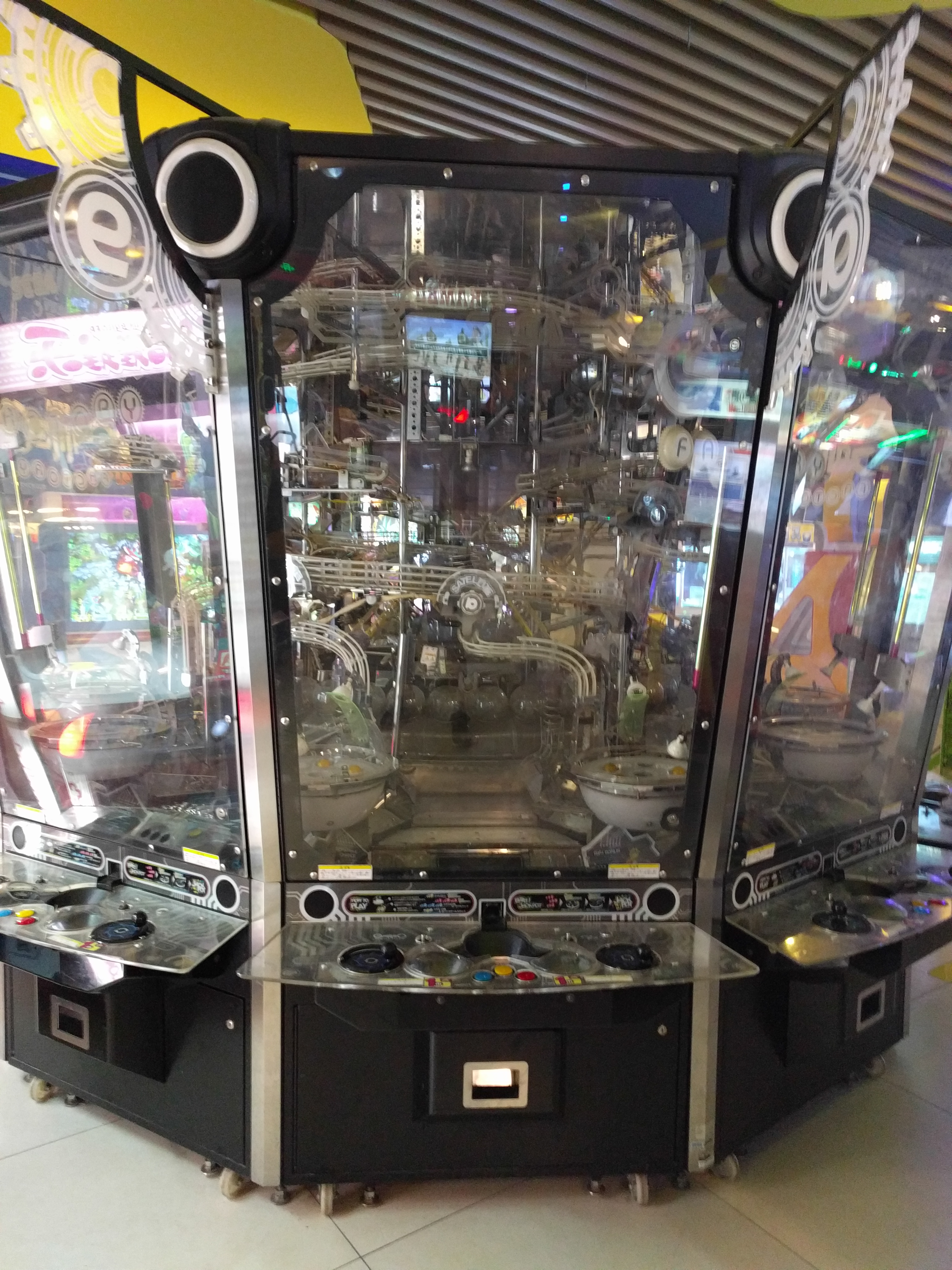
Galileo Factory, a SEGA-built medal game where balls travel through an elaborate roller coaster system inside the machine before being dropped onto the playfield, or onto a roulette wheel

Medal games (メダルゲーム, medaru gēmu) are a type of arcade game commonly found in amusement arcades and casinos, especially in Japan. In order to play a medal game, a customer must first exchange their cash into medals (metal coins, much like an arcade token). The rate of medals versus cash varies from arcade to arcade, but usually the cheapest range is from ¥300 all the way up to ¥10,000.

While many of the medal games simulate gambling, the medals cannot be traded back into cash, but only used to play more games, or exchanged (via paper tickets) for prizes.

There are many types of medal games, but the two most popular are the gambling type and the pusher game type. Medal games, similar to pachinko, are a way to simulate the experience of gambling in a country with restrictive gambling laws.

== Gambling type ==
One major category of medal games replicates casino-style games: examples include electro-mechanical roulette tables, video poker, video blackjack, slot machines and video horse racing lounges. These are often set up in a quite lavish lounge set up, each player has a personal screen, often with a padded chair, an ashtray, and cupholders. All of these personal seats are in front of a large screen displaying the virtual horse race.

== Pusher game type ==
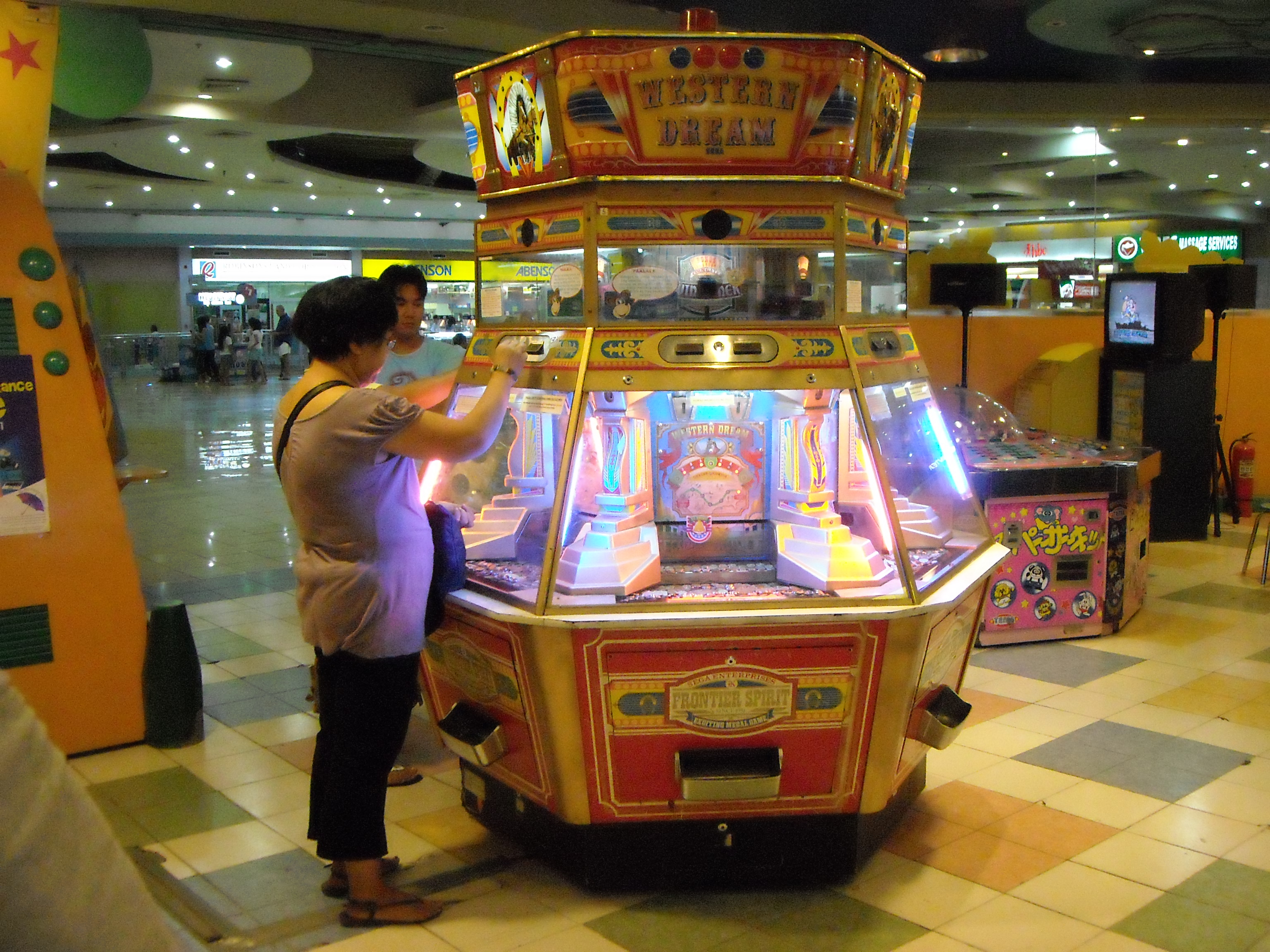
Western Dream, one example of a push medal game. If a player manages to get all red lights on, lights flash and a train stops at his/her side. The train tilts its tender full of coins, dumping them into the player's platform.

These games are characterized by multiple levels filled with medals or coins. Behind these platforms are mechanical "brooms" that push the coins forward. When a coin is dropped in, it falls onto one of the platforms and has the chance of pushing other coins (and possibly prizes placed on top of the coins) off the edge and being awarded to the player, unless they fall in the left and right 'lose' side of the edge. Timing in dropping the coin is a skill factor in the game.

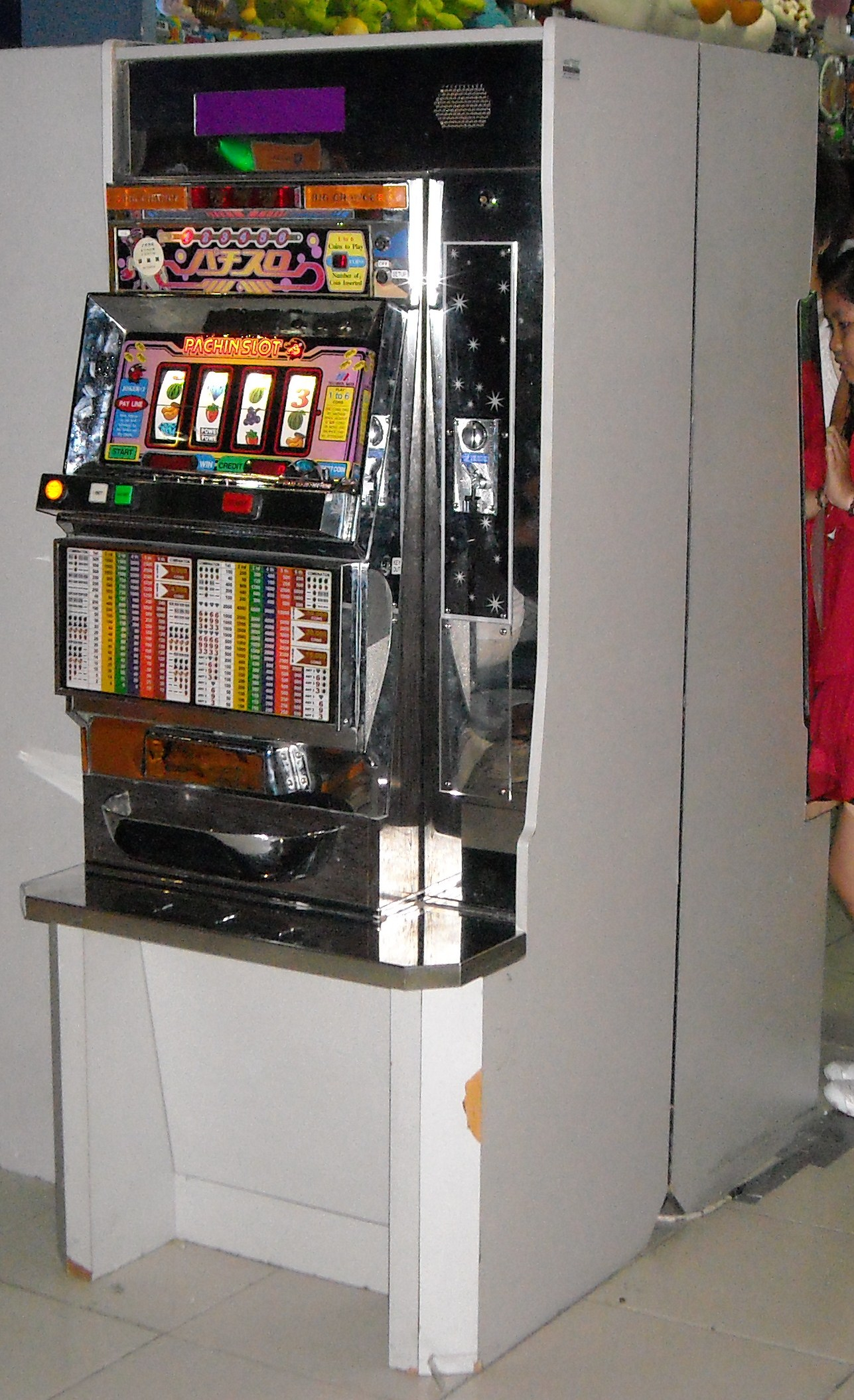
Pachin Slot, a medal game similar to a slot machine.

In the United Kingdom, these machines — commonly known as penny falls — are popular in arcades, and can often be found at tourist attractions such as theme parks and bowling alleys. Typically, these machines use real coins rather than tokens (usually a low denomination such as the 2p or 10p), but otherwise behave in the same way as games that operate with medals or tokens.

Variations on the pusher game can be much more complex. They often involve a Plinko-style chute that causes the coin to drop in which there are different slots the dropped medal can fall into, causing various in game effects. Some slots may have the machine drop in more coins, others may initiate a video slot machine built into the machine. From the video slot machine more coins and other bonuses can be awarded.

Many pusher games are connected to one another, some even with shared platforms, to form mega jackpots, sometimes as many as 100,000+ medals. Sometimes a video mini game can be activated, in which coins must be dropped or rolled to hit specific targets, or buttons on the machine must be pressed in order to play. In some machines, pressing buttons or completing timing-based mini-games (for example, making Mario jump to hit coin blocks) can unlock extra rewards or bonus medals.

Another aspect of the pusher games is that they are often themed on things targeted towards children, such as video game and cartoon characters.

== Early medal games ==
Game	Manufacturer	Type	Year
Harness Racing	Sega	Harness racing	1974
EVR Race	Nintendo	Racing	1975
The Derby Vφ	Aruze	Horse racing	1975

== See also ==
- Pachinko
- Redemption game
- Tipping Point, a UK game show based around a giant pusher machine
