= Whispers of a Machine =

2019 point-and-click adventure video game

- Humble Store header
- Developers: Clifftop Games; Faravid Interactive
- Publisher: Raw Fury
- Designers: Joel Staaf Hästö; Petter Ljungqvist
- Programmer: Joel Staaf Hästö
- Artist: Petter Ljungqvist
- Writers: Joel Staaf Hästö; Petter Ljungqvist
- Composer: Jacob Lincke
- Engine: Adventure Game Studio
- Platforms: Windows, macOS, Android, iOS
- Release: 17 April 2019
- Genre: Point-and-click adventure
- Mode: Single-player

Whispers of a Machine is a point-and-click adventure video game developed by Clifftop Games and Faravid Interactive, and published by Raw Fury in April 2019.

== Plot ==
Whispers of a Machine is set in a futuristic Sweden. The player is an augmented government agent, Vera Englund, who arrives in a small town to investigate a murder.

== Gameplay ==
Whispers of a Machine is a point-and-click adventure game. There are several different cybernetic augmentations that the player character can use to investigate the environment. Forensic scanner is used to scan a room for DNA and fingerprints. Biometric analyser is used to monitor suspect's heartrate. Muscle boost gives Vera super strength for a short time. Picking dialogue choices gives points to different personality traits: empathetic, analytical, or assertive. These lead to different augmentations and puzzle solutions.

== Reception ==
Reception

Aggregate score
Aggregator	Score
Metacritic	77/100

Review scores
Publication	Score
Adventure Gamers	4/5
GameSpot	7/10
PC Gamer (US)	70/100

Whispers of a Machine garnered generally positive reviews, and holds an average of 77/100 on aggregate web site Metacritic.

John Walker of Rock Paper Shotgun gave an overall positive review: "I really enjoyed it, I really appreciated having a methodical, forthright adventure game to play, with excellent art and animations, good music, great acting, and a story worth hearing. I just wish I'd been more of a detective as I did it."

The game was a nominee for Best Adventure and won the Reader's Choice award at the 2019 Aggie Awards.

== See also ==
- Kathy Rain, Clifftop Games' previous game
