= Coin pusher =

Physical arcade game

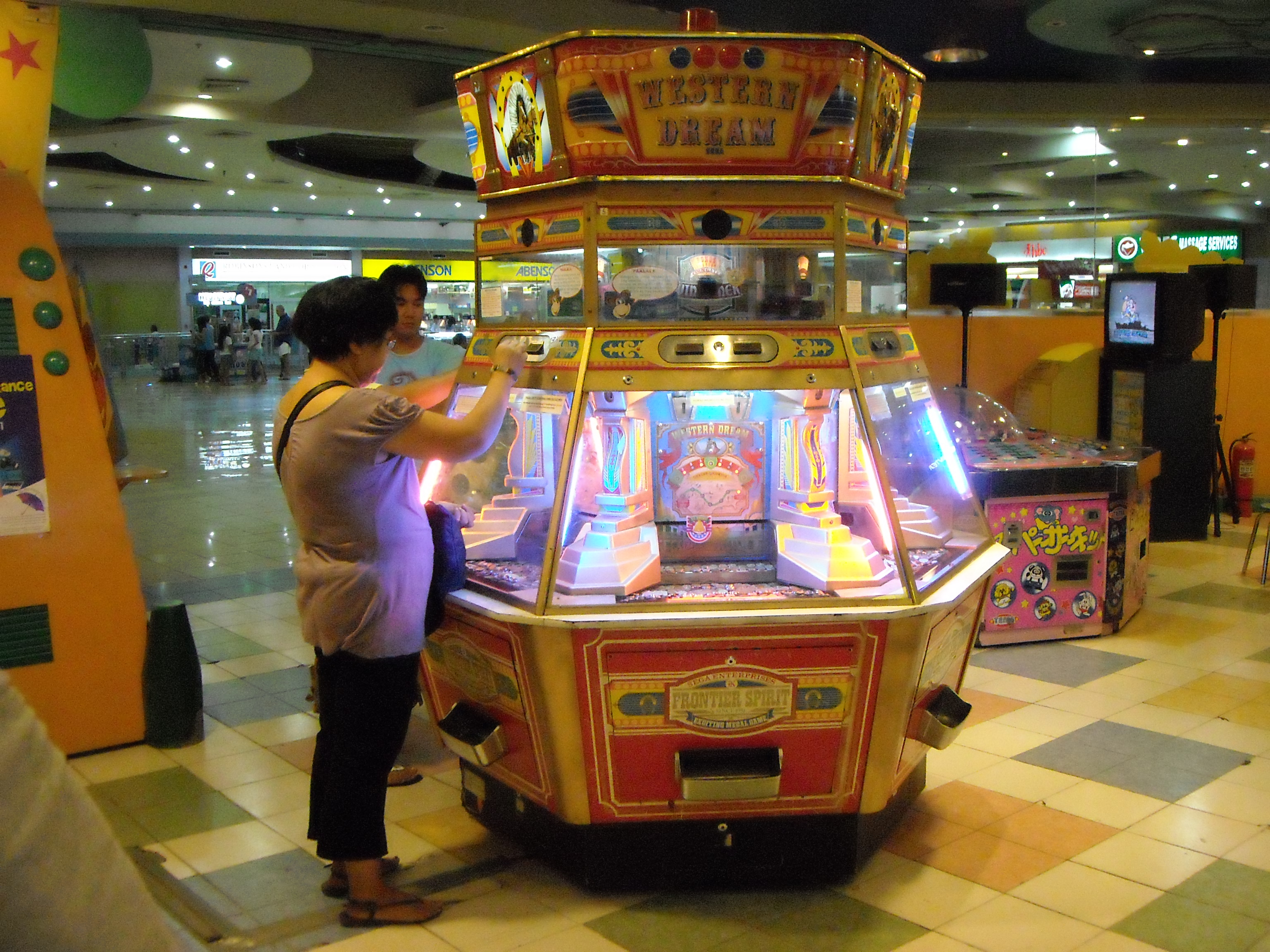
Western Dream (SEGA 1992), a coin pusher machine featuring six stations where six players can play simultaneously. Players insert coins into a slot at the top of the machine, and coins and prizes that fall off the playfield can be collected from the trough at the bottom. Unique to this machine, a model train travels in a loop at the top of the machine, and when the player achieves a jackpot the model train dumps coins onto their playfield.

A coin pusher is a type of arcade game with the objective of winning prizes in the form of coins or other items. Prizes are won when they are dislodged from a playfield covered in coins, into a payout slot. Players can only manipulate the playfield by adding coins to the opposite end of the playfield from the payout slot, where a continuously moving mechanism pushes newly added coins toward the payout slot.

== General mechanism ==
The game features a physical playfield that is covered in coins, and automatically moves back and forth. At one end of the playfield is a barricade, and the other end of the playfield ends in an overhang. As the playfield moves toward the barricade, part of it slides underneath the barricade, and the barricade pushes all of the coins toward the overhang. A player can drop coins onto the playfield, and their objective is to add coins to the playfield such that the barricade will push their coin into other coins, creating a chain reaction that pushes coins off the overhang at the other end of the playfield.

Below the last overhang is the payout slot, where any coins leaving the mechanism form the prize. In addition to the dislodged coins, larger prizes can also ride on top of the coins in the playfield, to be won if they fall into the payout slot with the coins.

== History ==
Penny Falls, the first recognizable coin pusher

The first recognizable coin pusher was Penny Falls, created by Alfred Crompton Ltd (later Crompton's Leisure Machines, LLC) in 1964. Penny Falls featured a single, large, moving playfield divided into 12 sections, where 12 players could play simultaneously. Players added coins to the playfield by inserting their own coins through a chute, and could collect any coins that were pushed off the edge of the playfield from a corresponding trough on the side of the machine.

The side-to-side playfield movement (with respect to the player) found in Penny Falls was replaced by a "towards/away" movement in later coin pusher machines, and most machines are two-tiered: first coins are pushed off the moving playfield by a stationary barricade, landing on a stationary lower playfield, and then the moving playfield pushes the coins off the edge of the stationary playfield.

A coin pusher machine typically also has small, usually hidden gaps at the sides of the playfield where coins can fall. The coins that fall here are not returned to the player, these are the operator's profit.

In addition to the coins, operators often add toys, jewelry, banknotes, and other items on top of the coins on the playfield, to entice players with a chance to win not only coins but also more valuable prizes.

Coin pushers are also popular in redemption game arcades. In these cases, coins that fall off the edge of the playfield are typically automatically exchanged for tickets instead of being given directly to the player.

In the mid-2010s, as many redemption arcades moved from physical tokens to digital tokens, coin pusher machines in the United States transitioned from having players add coins to the playfield by inserting them into the top of the machine to a system where the machine uses a hopper and elevator mechanism to move coins from the bottom of the machine to the top, from whence they are dropped when the player presses a button.

== Modern coin pushers ==
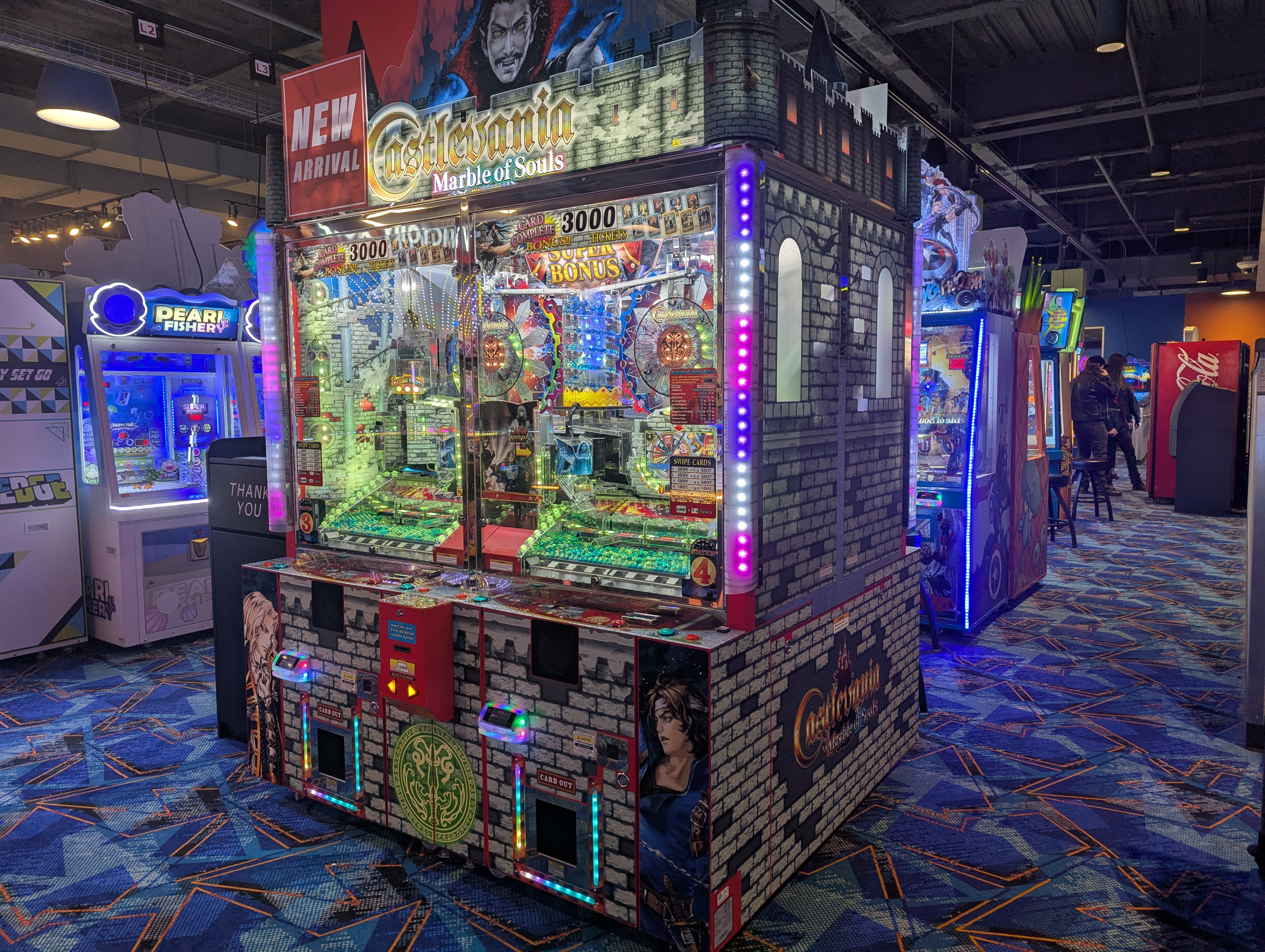
A Castlevania-themed "marble pusher" style game in a Round One arcade in Danbury, Connecticut. Pearl Fishery, a game with a similar playstyle, can be seen behind it.

Modern coin pusher machines are typically "self-contained" — recycling the coins that have fallen off the playfield back up to the top — rather than letting players insert their own coins and/or physically collect coins that have fallen off the playfield. In Japan, some coin pusher machines are this style, and some combine the new technology of this style with a physical coin "payout" — giving the player coins directly, and letting the player add coins by feeding them into a hopper.

Many modern coin pusher games combine their self-contained nature with the tradition of operators manually adding prizes to the playfield, by incorporating game mechanics that automatically add trading cards, plastic chips, balls, and other items to the playfield when triggered. In these cases, the machines contain mechanisms for physically filtering the items from the coins, and either giving the items to the player via a trough, or (typically in the case of balls) keeping the item in the machine and tallying it toward an additional goal.

=== Marble pushers ===
A recent new development in coin pusher games is the "marble pusher", which uses marbles instead of coins. Examples of marble pushers include Konami's Marble Fever, LAI Games's 'Rick & Morty Blipz and Chipz' and 'Pearl Fishery'.

== See also ==
- Medal game – A type of Japanese arcade game played with game tokens, a subset of which include coin pusher games.
- Raccoin – A 2026 video game incorporating coin pusher mechanics.
- Tipping Point (game show) – A British game show that incorporates the basic coin pusher mechanisms as an element of the show.
