= Raw Fury =

Swedish video game publisher

Raw Fury AB
- Type: Subsidiary
- Industry: Video games
- Founded: 2015; 11 years ago
- Founders: Jonas Antonsson; Gordon Van Dyke
- Headquarters: Stockholm, Sweden
- Area served: Worldwide
- Key people: Pim Holfve (CEO)
- Owner: Altor Equity Partners (majority)
- Number of employees: ≈40 (2019)
- Website: rawfury.com

Raw Fury AB is a Swedish video game publisher, specialising in the publication of indie games, based in Stockholm. The company was founded in 2015 by Jonas Antonsson and Gordon Van Dyke.

== History ==
The company was founded in 2015 by Jonas Antonsson, ex-vice-president of mobile for Paradox Interactive, and Gordon Van Dyke, formerly a producer for EA DICE on the various Battlefield titles. The company was announced in April 2015 as a "publisher for boutique and indie games", calling themselves an "UnPublisher" as it intends to support developers by "dismantl[ing] how publishing traditionally works" and providing supportive services that better serve indie game development.

In July 2016, Karl Magnus Troedsson stepped down as general manager of EA DICE to become a partner and co-owner of Raw Fury. In early September 2019, Raw Fury opened Fury Studios, an internal development studio located in Zagreb, Croatia, to aid external developers with porting, quality assurance, and other support matters. At the same time, the company moved headquarters within Stockholm to cope with its growing employee count, which reached roughly 40 people worldwide.

In August 2021, Altor Equity Partners acquired a majority ownership of Raw Fury for an undisclosed price. Raw Fury said, "The experience and monetary boost that Altor brings to the table will allow us to increase our production capacity and add to the team at Raw Fury, giving us the ability to publish larger projects while continuing to still fund smaller projects and experimental art."

In October 2021, Raw Fury announced that it had entered into a first-look deal with DJ2 Entertainment to develop television and film projects.

In October 2025, Raw Fury's sister publisher Neon Doctrine announced that it would merge with Raw Fury "as part of broader restructuring", with its catalogue of game titles falling under Raw Fury's management.

== Games published ==
| Year | Title | Platform(s) | Developer(s) |
|---|---|---|---|
| 2015 | Kingdom | Windows, macOS, Linux | Noio, Licorice |
| 2016 | Kathy Rain | Windows, macOS, Android, iOS | Clifftop Games |
| 2016 | Kingdom: New Lands | Windows, macOS, Linux, Xbox One, PlayStation 4, Nintendo Switch, Android, iOS | Noio |
| 2016 | Gonner | Windows, macOS, Linux, Xbox One, PlayStation 4, Nintendo Switch | Art in Heart |
| 2017 | Tormentor X Punisher | Windows, macOS | E-Studio |
| 2017 | Uurnog Uurnlimited | Windows, macOS, Nintendo Switch | Nifflas Games |
| 2018 | Dandara | Windows, macOS, Linux, Xbox One, PlayStation 4, Nintendo Switch, Android, iOS | Long Hat House |
| 2018 | Bad North | Windows, macOS, Xbox One, PlayStation 4, Nintendo Switch | Plausible Concept |
| 2018 | Kingdom Two Crowns | Windows, macOS, Linux, Xbox One, PlayStation 4, Nintendo Switch, Android, iOS | Fury Studios, Stumpysquid |
| 2019 | Out There: Ω The Alliance | Nintendo Switch | Mi-Clos Studio |
| 2019 | Whispers of a Machine | Windows, macOS, Android, iOS | Clifftop Games, Faravid Interactive |
| 2019 | Night Call | Windows, macOS, Xbox One, Nintendo Switch | Monkey Moon, Black Muffin |
| 2019 | Bad North: Jotunn Edition | Windows, macOS, Xbox One, PlayStation 4, Nintendo Switch, Android, iOS | Plausible Concept |
| 2019 | Mosaic | Windows, macOS, Xbox One, PlayStation 4, Nintendo Switch | Krillbite Studio |
| 2020 | West of Dead | Windows, Xbox One, PlayStation 4, Nintendo Switch | Upstream Arcade |
| 2020 | Star Renegades | Windows, Xbox One, PlayStation 4, Nintendo Switch | Massive Damage, Inc |
| 2020 | GONNER2 | Windows, macOS, Linux, Xbox One, PlayStation 4, Nintendo Switch | Art in Heart |
| 2020 | Per Aspera | Windows, Meta Quest 2 | Tlön Industries |
| 2020 | Call of the Sea | Windows, Xbox One, Xbox Series X/S, PlayStation 4, PlayStation 5, Amazon Luna, Nintendo Switch | Out of the Blue |
| 2020 | The Signifier | Windows, macOS | Playmestudio |
| 2020 | Atomicrops | Windows, Xbox One, PlayStation 4, Nintendo Switch | Bird Bath Games |
| 2021 | The Longest Road on Earth | Windows, Xbox One, Xbox Series X/S, PlayStation 4, PlayStation 5, Nintendo Switch, Android, iOS | Brainwash Gang, TLR Games |
| 2021 | Backbone | Windows, macOS, PlayStation 4, PlayStation 5, Xbox One, Xbox Series X/S, Nintendo Switch | EggNut |
| 2021 | Townscaper | Windows, macOS, Xbox Series X/S, Nintendo Switch, Android, iOS, | Oskar Stålberg |
| 2021 | Sable | Windows, Xbox Series X/S, PlayStation 5 | Shedworks |
| 2021 | Kathy Rain: The Director's Cut | Windows, macOS, Nintendo Switch, Android, iOS | Clifftop Games |
| 2021 | Kingdom Two Crowns: Norse Lands | Windows, macOS, Linux, Xbox One, Xbox Series X/S, PlayStation 4, Nintendo Switch, iOS, Android | Fury Studios, Stumpysquid |
| 2021 | Dream Cycle | Windows | Cathuria Games |
| 2021 | Wolfstride | Windows, Nintendo Switch | OTA IMON Studios |
| 2022 | NORCO | Windows, macOS, Xbox One, Xbox Series X/S, PlayStation 4, PlayStation 5 | Geography of Robots |
| 2022 | Dome Keeper | Windows, macOS, Linux, Xbox Series X/S, Android, iOS, Nintendo Switch, PlayStation 5 | Bippinbits |
| 2022 | Flat Eye | Windows, macOS | Monkey Moon |
| 2023 | Superfuse | Windows | Stitch Heads Entertainment |
| 2023 | Tails: The Backbone Preludes | Windows | EggNut |
| 2023 | GUN JAM | Windows | Jaw Drop Games |
| 2023 | Mr. Sun's Hatbox | Windows, macOS, Nintendo Switch | Kenny Sun |
| 2023 | Cassette Beasts | Windows, Linux, Xbox One, Xbox Series X/S, Nintendo Switch, Android, iOS | Bytten Studio |
| 2023 | Friends vs Friends | Windows, PlayStation 5, Xbox Series X/S | Brainwash Gang |
| 2023 | Kingdom Eighties | Windows, macOS, Linux, Xbox Series X/S, PlayStation 5, Nintendo Switch, Android, iOS | Fury Studios |
| 2023 | Moonstone Island | Windows, macOS, Linux, Nintendo Switch | Studio Supersoft |
| 2023 | Pizza Possum | Windows, Xbox Series X/S, PlayStation 5, Nintendo Switch | Cosy Computer |
| 2023 | American Arcadia | Windows, Nintendo Switch, PlayStation 4, PlayStation 5, Xbox One, Xbox Series X/S | Out of the Blue Games |
| 2024 | Snufkin: Melody of Moominvalley | Windows, macOS, Xbox Series X/S, PlayStation 5, Nintendo Switch | Hyper Games |
| 2024 | Zet Zillions | Windows | OTA IMON Studios |
| 2024 | Skald: Against the Black Priory | Windows, macOS | High North Studios AS |
| 2024 | Star Trucker | Windows, Xbox Series X/S, PlayStation 5 | Monster and Monster |
| 2024 | Ballionaire | Windows | newobject |
| 2025 | Post Trauma | Windows, PlayStation 5, Xbox Series X/S | Red Soul Games |
| 2025 | Knights in Tight Spaces | Windows | Ground Shatter |
| 2025 | Blue Prince | Windows, macOS, PlayStation 5, Xbox Series X/S, Nintendo Switch 2 | Dogubomb |
| 2025 | Kathy Rain 2: Soothsayer | Windows, macOS, Linux | Clifftop Games |
| 2025 | The Séance of Blake Manor | Windows, Linux, Nintendo Switch 2, PlayStation 5, Xbox Series X/S | Spooky Doorway |
| 2025 | Monsters are Coming! Rock & Road | Windows, Xbox Series X/S | Ludogram |
| 2025 | Routine | Windows, Xbox One, Xbox Series X/S | Lunar Software |
| 2026 | Esoteric Ebb | Windows | Christoffer Bodegård |
| 2026 | Regions of Ruin: Runegate | Windows, macOS, Linux | Gameclaw Studio |
| 2026 | Last Man Sitting | Windows | DoubleMoose Games |
| 2026 | KuloNiku: Bowl Up! | Windows, Nintendo Switch, Nintendo Switch 2 | Gambir Studio |
| 2026 | Rivage | Windows, PlayStation 5, Xbox Series X/S | Exnilo Studio |
| 2026 | Deep Dish Dungeon | Windows, Xbox Series X/S | Behold Studios |
| 2026 | Appulse | Windows | Le Rado |
| 2026 | Hillthorn | Windows, macOS, Linux, Nintendo Switch, Android, iOS | Fool Moon, Finnegan Motors |
| 2026 | Dungeon Automata | Windows | Medium-Rare Games |
| 2027 | Cassette Beasts 2002 | Windows, Linux, PlayStation 5, Xbox Series X/S, Nintendo Switch 2 | Bytten Studio |
| 2027 | My Cannibal Family | Windows, PlayStation 5, Xbox Series X/S | Wolf & Wood Interactive |
| 2027 | Kingdom III: Rising Realms | Windows, Nintendo Switch 2, PlayStation 5, Xbox Series X/S | Fury Studios |
| TBA | My Work Is Not Yet Done | Windows, macOS | Sutemi Productions |
| TBA | Bye Bye Bonie | Windows | Brainwash Gang |
