= Kingdom: New Lands =

2016 video game

- Developers: Noio; Licorice
- Publisher: Raw Fury
- Platforms: Microsoft Windows; macOS; PlayStation 4; Nintendo Switch; Xbox One; iOS; Android; tvOS
- Release: Windows, macOS, Xbox One; 9 August 2016; iOS; 10 March 2017; Android; 11 March 2017; Switch; 14 September 2017; PS4; 16 January 2018
- Genres: Strategy, Roguelike
- Mode: Single-player

Kingdom: New Lands is a 2016 strategy game developed by Amsterdam-based Noio and Iceland-based Licorice and published by Raw Fury. It was released on 9 August 2016 for Windows, macOS, and Xbox One. A follow-up of the 2015 video game Kingdom, players take control of a mounted monarch as they build and defend their kingdom from monsters called the Greed. The monarch can recruit subjects such as builders and archers to fortify their base, while progressing towards their goal of ruling over five islands. New Lands was a free update for owners of the original version. Versions for iOS and Android were released in March 2017, and for Nintendo Switch in September 2017, followed by PlayStation 4 on 16 January 2018. The game received mixed to generally positive reviews on release.

== Gameplay ==
Kingdom: New Lands is a 2D side-scrolling strategical and roguelike game. The player character is a monarch mounted upon a steed, who must build a kingdom and defend it at night from monsters called the Greed. At the same time, they must progress between five procedurally generated islands by repairing a ship, with each island being more difficult than the last. The monarch begins with two villagers and a small number of coins. To build the kingdom, the monarch must recruit subjects and give them jobs, such as builders that construct defenses, or archers that attack the Greed and hunt rabbits for coins. Coins can be spent to hire new villagers found at camps outside the kingdom, or used to construct walls and repair useful buildings. Recruited subjects can be given jobs if the monarch spends coins to buy equipment, but if the villagers are attacked by the Greed, they lose their tools and become beggars. Monarchs must keep the constantly increasing waves of Greed at bay, in order to prevent them from stealing the monarch's crown and causing a game over.

== Release ==
The Android and iOS version were announced for release on 31 January 2017. They were delayed to "later this winter" On 27 January 2017. The iOS version was released on 9 March 2017.

== Reception ==
Reception

Aggregate score
Aggregator	Score
Metacritic	XONE: 87/100; NS: 74/100

According to the review aggregate website Metacritic, Kingdom: New Lands received "generally favorable" reviews for its Xbox One version, and "mixed to average reviews" for its Nintendo Switch release. Nintendo World Report praised the visual effects, lighting, and strategic elements of gameplay, but said that the frame rate had noticeable issues. Rating the game a 6/10, Nintendo Life similarly cited the pixel art and soundtrack as strengths, but said that some players would find the gameplay elements to be too simplistic. Destructoid found the Switch version to have technical problems, while Jeuxvideo praised the soundtrack and the content additions over the original Kingdom, but said that the AI did not always work as intended.
