= Mr. Sun's Hatbox =

2023 video game

- Developer: Kenny Sun
- Publisher: Raw Fury
- Platforms: Windows; Nintendo Switch
- Release: April 20, 2023
- Genres: Platformer, Roguelike, Management
- Mode: Co-op mode; multiplayer; single-player

Mr. Sun's Hatbox is a 2023 roguelike platformer video game developed by Kenny Sun and published by Raw Fury Games.

== Gameplay ==
Mr. Sun's Hatbox is a roguelike platformer featuring base and team management mechanics. In the game, the player is tasked with building up a crew to take down Mr. Moon and his henchmen across a variety of action-platformer missions. Completing missions allows players to build out their base and grow their crew. Bases have use-specific units, such as a lab for experimentation on your staff, and a black market for purchasing illicit contraband.

The game has over 50 hats with special properties that offer gameplay quirks. Crew "minions" are also unique and can be given special abilities/leveled. The game has a permadeath system for minions lost on missions.

In-game missions are playable solo or with a friend in co-op. 1v1 and Last One Standing PvP modes are available via local multiplayer and Steam Remote Play Together.

== Development ==
Developer Kenny Sun is based in Brooklyn. A trailer featuring gameplay was released in August 2022. That same month, the game's release date was announced as 2023.

Development began on the title in 2015, before the project was abandoned. Development resumed sometime in 2019. Kenny Sun developed the game solo and was inspired by Metal Gear Solid 5's balloon recovery system. He also claimed to have drawn inspiration from Spelunky.

Kenny Sun had previously developed the titles Circa Infinity and Yankai’s Peak.

== Release ==
Mr. Sun's Hatbox was released on April 20, 2023, for Windows and Nintendo Switch. According to Metacritic, the game received "Generally Favorable" reviews from critics. Developer Kenny Sun later saw notable success with another roguelike, 2025's Ball x Pit, published by Devolver Digital.

=== Reception ===
Reception

Aggregate score
Aggregator	Score
Metacritic	(PC) 76/100

GameRant was positive toward the game, saying it was perfect for quick, fulfilling play sessions.

Shack News also reviewed the title positively. Their review noted the game's charm, humor, and melding of mechanics/systems as impressive. Some criticism was directed at early game balance. The game has been compared favorably to Metal Gear Solid 5.
