= Ballionaire =

2024 video game

- Developer: newobject
- Publisher: Raw Fury
- Engine: Godot
- Platform: Windows
- Release: December 10, 2024
- Genres: Roguelike, strategy
- Mode: Single-player

Ballionaire is a roguelike strategy video game developed by newobject and published by Raw Fury. It was released on December 10, 2024 for Windows.

== Gameplay ==
Ballionaire is a pachinko-inspired roguelike video game in which the player drops balls onto a board filled with a variety of pegs. As the ball descends, it interacts with the pegs it contacts, triggering their effects and generating money. After each turn, the player is presented with a selection of three new pegs, from which one can be chosen to permanently add to the board. The objective is to accumulate enough money to hit an ever increasing target.

== Development ==
Seattle-based developer newobject developed the game.

== Reception ==
Reception

Aggregate scores
Aggregator	Score
Metacritic	76/100
OpenCritic	70% recommend

Review scores
Publication	Score
PC Gamer (US)	80/100
The Guardian	4/5
Screenrant	7/10

Ballionaire received "generally favorable" reviews from critics, according to review aggregator website Metacritic. OpenCritic determined that 70% of critics recommended the game.

Reviewers drew favorable comparisons to Peggle and praised the satisfying gameplay experience. Criticisms included the unclear explanations of certain pegs and a limited amount of available content.
