= Dome Keeper =

2022 video game

- Developer: Bippinbits
- Publisher: Raw Fury
- Director: René Habermann
- Producer: René Habermann
- Designer: René Habermann
- Programmers: René Habermann; John Watson
- Artists: Anne Hecker; Brandon Schenk; Davis Hill
- Composer: Cameron Paxton
- Engine: Godot Engine
- Platforms: Windows; macOS; Linux; Xbox Series X/S; Android; iOS; Nintendo Switch; PlayStation 5
- Release: Windows, macOS, Linux; 27 September 2022; Xbox Series X/S; 9 December 2025; Android, iOS; 12 October 2026; Switch, PS5; 14 December 2026
- Genres: Tower defense, roguelike
- Mode: Single-player

Dome Keeper is a 2022 tower defense video game developed by German studio Bippinbits and published by Raw Fury. It was released for Windows, macOS and Linux on 27 September 2022, for Xbox Series X/S on 9 December 2025, and for Android and iOS on 12 October 2026. Versions for Nintendo Switch and PlayStation 5 are set to release on 14 December 2026. In the game, players must defend themselves against alien creatures attacking their glass dome. After the current wave of enemies is defeated, the player may spend a limited amount of time to mine for resources underneath the dome, which they can use to upgrade their defenses and better fight against the next onslaught of enemies. The game received generally positive reviews on release.

== Gameplay ==
Dome Keeper is a tower defense game with roguelike elements. Players control a character managing a glass dome, which acts as their spacecraft. After the spacecraft crashes down onto an extraterrestrial landscape, the player must defend their dome from the native aliens intent on destroying it. The player character moves around using a jetpack, and can mine through the ground using a drill. The main resources that the player must acquire are iron, cobalt, and water, which can be mined for beneath the dome and spent on upgrades. A timer indicates the amount of time left before the next wave of enemies, and the character must return to the dome with as many resources as possible before the aliens arrive and begin damaging it. The main weapons the player uses to fight are a laser beam that rotates around the dome, or a sword-like appendage that can be extended to hit enemies. Both weapons can be improved to have greater damage or attack strength, while the character can also spend resources on themselves to increase their movement speed or drill power. The goal of the player in the default game mode "Relic Hunt" is to fight off the waves of enemies and continue mining for resources in-between, while digging deep enough to find an ancient relic used to eradicate the aliens.

== Development ==
Bippinbits submitted Dome Keeper, then named Dome Romantik, as an entry in the April 2021 Ludum Dare 48 game jam. It achieved 9th place overall, prompting the team to develop the game as a full Steam release.

== Reception ==
Reception

Aggregate score
Aggregator	Score
Metacritic	76/100

Review scores
Publication	Score
PC Gamer (US)	80/100
Shacknews	7/10

According to the review aggregator website Metacritic, Dome Keeper received "generally favorable reviews". PC Gamer called the game a "simple yet nuanced roguelike." and praised the weapons and resource management gameplay, but noted the game's short playtime and a few minor technical issues. Shacknews appreciated the simplicity of gameplay design and execution, but said that the gameplay could become predictable after several playthroughs. In a more critical review, Eurogamer felt that the game was "as divided as my thoughts are on it" and said that the mining and tower defense gameplay struggled because of how the game divided its attention between both genres.
