= Call of the Sea =

2020 video game

- Developer: Out of the Blue
- Publisher: Raw Fury
- Director: Tatiana Delgado Yunquera
- Producer: Manuel Fernández-Truchaud Lorenzo
- Designers: Álvaro González Pérez; Alfredo González-Barros Camba
- Programmers: Manuel Fernández-Truchaud Lorenzo; Javier Serrano García
- Artist: Daniel Nombela López
- Writer: Alfredo González-Barros Camba
- Composer: Eduardo de la Iglesia
- Engine: Unreal Engine 4
- Platforms: Windows; Xbox One; Xbox Series X/S; Amazon Luna; PlayStation 4; PlayStation 5; Nintendo Switch
- Release: Win, Xbox One, Series X/S; December 8, 2020; Luna; April 15, 2021; PS4, PS5; May 11, 2021; Switch; September 9, 2025
- Genre: Adventure
- Mode: Single-player

Call of the Sea is an adventure video game developed by Out of the Blue and published by Raw Fury. The game was released for Windows, Xbox One, and Xbox Series X/S on December 8, 2020. The game was also released for Amazon Luna on April 15, 2021, for PlayStation 4 and PlayStation 5 on May 11, 2021, and for Nintendo Switch on September 9, 2025.

A sequel, titled Call of the Elder Gods, was released on May 12, 2026, for Windows, PlayStation 5, and Xbox Series X/S.

== Gameplay ==
Call of the Sea is an adventure video game played from a first-person perspective. The game is set in the 1930s, and players assume control of Norah (Cissy Jones), who must explore an island set in the Southern Pacific to find her husband, Harry (Yuri Lowenthal), who has gone missing after embarking on an expedition. The game does not feature a combat system, and players progress in the game by solving various puzzles.

== Plot ==
Norah Everhart receives a package with a picture of her husband Harry, detailing coordinates to an island east of Otaheite (Tahiti). Harry had vanished after embarking on an expedition to find a cure for Norah's mysterious family illness, which is slowly killing her. Norah journeys to the island, which she had had recurring dreams of. Moving inland, she finds a camp used by the expedition, which consisted of Harry, reporter Cassandra Ward, mechanic Frank Drayton, dermatologist Ernest De Witt, stuntman Roy Granger, and their Tahitian guide Teaharoa.

The expedition had found a well used by the islanders for a ritual involving a black ichor. Impatient, Roy had used dynamite to blow open the well, accidentally killing himself and splatting De Witt's arm with the ichor. De Witt then started losing his sanity and developing skin blotches similar to Norah's. The team had attempted to replicate the ritual, but abandoned it after the ship that brought them, the Lady Shannon, had washed ashore nearby. Norah replicates the ritual, causing the well to fill with ooze with her inside. She experiences a vision in which she walks off a cliff into a river, while watched by a giant amphibious-looking creature, and finds herself transformed into a sea creature.

Norah wakes up near the crashed Lady Shannon, and finds it torn apart with claw marks, with its crew missing. Norah finds the expedition had set up another camp, and De Witt, now insane, had stabbed Frank, but was stopped and tied up, later disappearing. The team had discovered an organ carved into the rocks and used it to open a passage to a temple on the island's peak. Norah travels to the temple, where the expedition had employed loudspeakers to use the organ's music to open the temple door. This caused a rockslide, while Frank had succumbed to his stab wound. After restoring power to the loudspeakers, Norah is knocked out, and dreams of a desert surrounded by the bones of sea creatures, and of her mother's music box, which played the organ's music. Singing it, Norah opens the temple, and finds a note by Harry explaining that she is not ill, but instead changing into something new.

Norah finds gateways that allow her to transform into the sea creature she became in her vision. She arrives at a village, used by the island's inhabitants, who were 'slaves' of unknown masters. Norah finds a note by Harry explaining that the masters took their slaves to a 'sanctuary' to complete their transformation, which he intended to undergo to become like Norah, so they could be together. This led to arguments between Cassandra and Teaharoa, leading to the latter leaving the island. As Norah journeys to the sanctuary, she feels more "alive" on the island than she ever had. During a vision, a sketch of her family tree can be discovered where she is seen distantly related to an ancient god/merperson.

At the sanctuary, she finds a note from Harry in which he seems to be losing his sanity, with blood leading into the building. Norah enters the throne room, and finds a mutated corpse, with Harry's glasses beside it. Norah realizes the body is Cassandra's, who, coveting the sea creatures' immortality, had shot Harry, attempted the ritual, and died in the process. Harry understood that the ritual would not work on him, and left. He sent Norah the package, faking his death in an attempt to get her to undergo the transformation and save herself.

Depending on player choice, Norah can either complete her transformation or reject it. If she transforms, she abandons her humanity and journeys underwater for eternal life, at the cost of never seeing Harry again. If she rejects it, she lives out the rest of her remaining years with Harry. During the credits, Norah and Harry sing their favorite song, "Dear Old Pal of Mine", together. Depending on the choice, the couple will either finish the song (implying it is a memory), or be interrupted by Norah's illness. Regardless of the ending, Harry is left alone, and years later, now works as the Dean of Archaeology at Miskatonic University, contemplating whether he made the right decision in lying to Norah. If the player chose to return to Harry, he does reflect lovingly about their last few years together during which they had moved to live by the sea.

== Development ==
Call of the Sea is the debut title for Out of the Blue, an independent studio based in Madrid, Spain. The team consisted of about 12 people. According to Tatiana Delgado, the founder of Out of the Blue, the game was heavily inspired by the works of H. P. Lovecraft. She specified that they only took inspirations from the "surreal" and "oneiric" part of his work, and said the game would not be a horror game. She added, "Call of the Sea isn't a descent into madness but a rise to sanity". The game was a narrative-focused game, with the team working to ensure the puzzles featured in the game were fully integrated with the story. The game also drew influence from other adventure games such as Firewatch, Myst, Soma, and Subnautica.

The game was announced on May 7, 2020, during a digital event hosted by Xbox Game Studios. Call of the Sea was released for Windows, Xbox One and Xbox Series X/S on December 8, 2020. The game was also released for Amazon Luna on April 15, 2021, followed by versions for PlayStation 4 and PlayStation 5 on May 11, 2021.

== Reception ==
Reception

Aggregate scores
Aggregator	Score
Metacritic	PC: 78/100; XONE: 81/100; XSXS: 75/100; PS5: 73/100
OpenCritic	69% recommend

Review scores
Publication	Score
Adventure Gamers	4/5
Destructoid	7.5/10
Edge	6/10
Eurogamer	Recommended
Game Informer	8.5/10
Hardcore Gamer	3.5/5
IGN	9/10
Push Square	6/10
The Guardian	4/5
VideoGamer.com	7/10

Call of the Sea received positive reviews from critics, who praised the narrative and the island setting, but criticized some of the game's puzzles as being obtuse. The game has "generally favorable reviews" on Metacritic. Fellow review aggregator OpenCritic assessed that the game received strong approval, being recommended by 69% of critics.

In a review of Call of the Sea in Black Gate, Neil Baker said "I've read criticisms that claim they can be a bit obtuse, but I disagree. The puzzles are certainly achievable if you put the time in and utilize all the hints Out of the Blue provides, but I'll readily admit that on one occasion I had to resort to an online solution written by a younger person than I, someone with a fresher brain."

== Sequel ==
A sequel, titled Call of the Elder Gods, was announced in June 2025. Developed by Out of the Blue Games and published by Kwalee, the game was inspired by The Shadow Out of Time and its cast include Yuri Lowenthal and Cissy Jones. It was released on May 12, 2026 for Windows, Nintendo Switch 2, PlayStation 5 and Xbox Series X and Series S.

== See also ==
- Cthulhu Mythos in popular culture
- Lovecraftian horror
