= Atari SA =

Video game holding company

- Formerly: Infogrames Entertainment SA (1983–2009)
- Type: Public limited company
- Traded as: Euronext Paris: ALATA
- ISIN: FR0010478248
- Industry: Video games
- Founded: June 1983; 43 years ago in Lyon, France
- Founders: Bruno Bonnell; Christophe Sapet
- Headquarters: Gare, Luxembourg
- Key people: Wade J. Rosen (chairman and CEO)
- Brands: Atari; Nightdive Studios; Digital Eclipse; Infogrames; Intellivision
- Revenue: ▲€13.7 million (2024)
- Operating income: ▼€−6.2 million (2024)
- Net income: ▼€−8.3 million (2024)
- Total assets: ▼€64.5 million (2024)
- Total equity: ▼€0.3 million (2024)
- Owners: Wade Rosen (42.82%)
- Subsidiaries: See § Subsidiaries
- Website: atari-investisseurs.fr

Atari SA, formerly Infogrames Entertainment SA (French pronunciation: [ɛ̃fɔɡʁam]) and also known as Atari Group, is a Luxembourgish holding company that owns mainly video gaming-related interactive entertainment properties. Atari SA's publishing labels include Atari, Inc. (formerly GT Interactive), Nightdive Studios and Digital Eclipse, and Infogrames. It is known for the RollerCoaster Tycoon series, produces video game consoles including the Atari VCS, contains blockchain division Atari X, and additionally owns the websites MobyGames and AtariAge. Through its acqusitions, the company owns the intellectual property rights to many video game properties that originated from Accolade, Atari, Inc., Atari Corporation, GT Interactive, Ocean Software, M Network via Intellivision and others. Before rebranding as Atari in 2009, it began using the Atari brand for various purposes in 2001, which is licensed by subsidiary Atari Interactive Inc. to the other entities in the group.

Founded in Lyon, France as Infogrames, they published numerous video games during the 1990s and eventually became one of the largest video game companies in the world through an acquisition policy. However, later, as Atari SA, after selling bulk of its assets gained through the policy, it dealt with continuing pressures and difficulty finding investors which led to the company seeking bankruptcy protection under French law in January 2013 while the remaining subsidiaries in the United States sought Chapter 11 bankruptcy protection as well.

Since 2023, the company has seen a turnaround with a new focus on retro gaming, acquiring and re-releasing older titles and acquiring developers and publishers in this area; it also abandoned its cryptocurrency, casino, and mobile gaming divisions, which the company had focused on during previous leadership.

== History ==
=== Founding and beginnings (1983–1996) ===
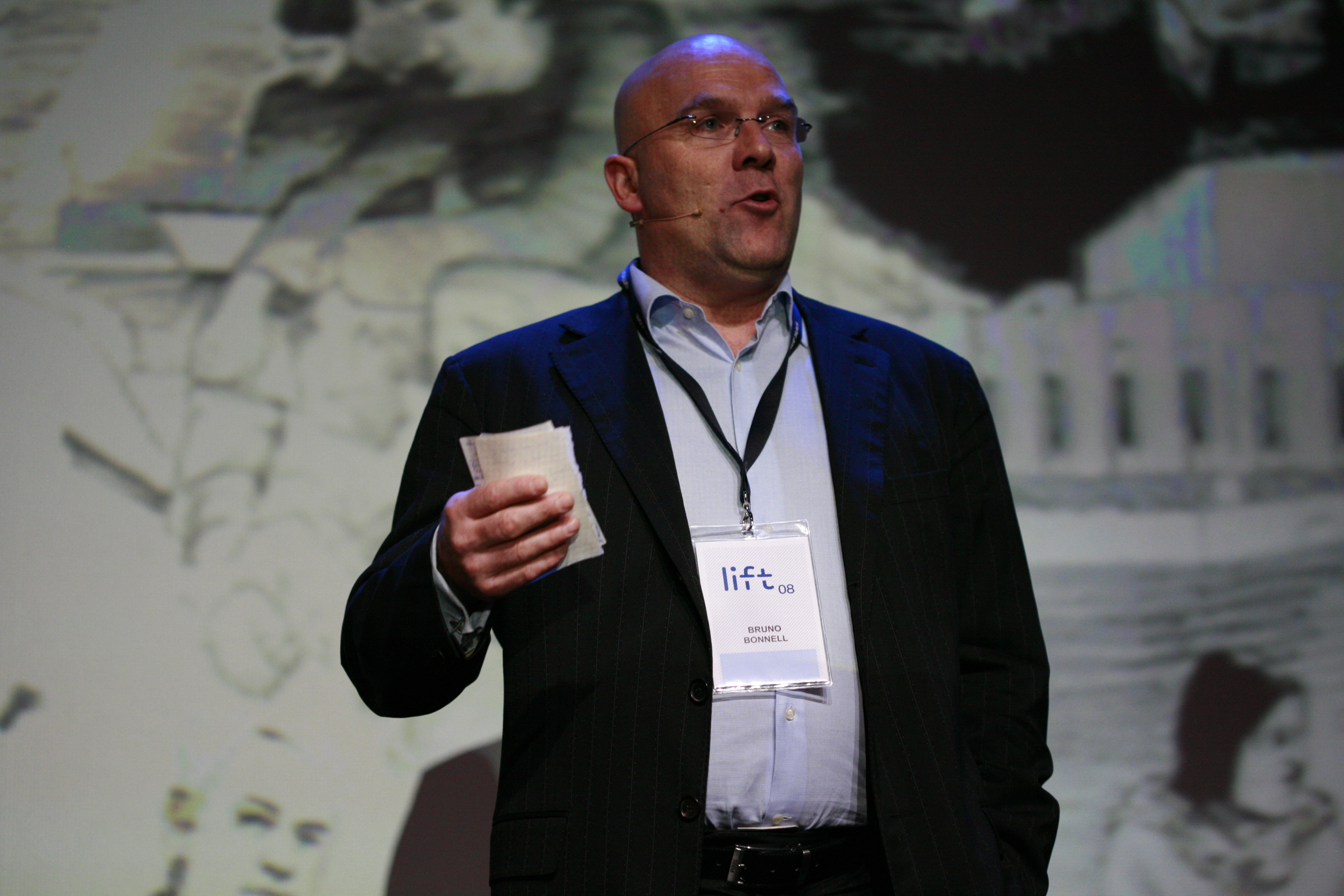
Bruno Bonnell in 2008

The company was founded by Bruno Bonnell and Christophe Sapet. They wanted to christen the company Zboub Système (which can be approximately translated to Dick System in English), but were dissuaded by their legal counsel. According to Bonnell in a TV interview, they then used a mix-and-match computer program to suggest other names, one of which was "Infogramme": a portmanteau of the French words "informatique" (information technology) and "programme" (computer program). The final choice, Infogrames, was a slightly modified version of that suggestion.

The company logo and mascot is an armadillo (tatou in French), chosen when the company was moved to Villeurbanne. Bonnell commented: "This dinosaur [sic] is our symbol. The armadillo has always survived changes to its environment, from the melting of glaciers to the worst of heat waves."

In 1983, Infogrames released their first title The Cube, which sold 60,000 copies.

In the late 1980s, Infogrames was noted for its French computer games that often featured original game ideas and occasionally humorous content. They had acquired several licences for popular Franco-Belgian comics.

In 1987, Infogrames extended to the growing Multimedia market by founding Infogrames Multimedia, which would later develop and publish CD-ROM based games and software. In the same year, they formed an interactive videotex division, Infogrames Télématique.

In 1992, they released Alone in the Dark, a 3D horror adventure game, to international attention.

By 1995, Infogrames was held by many shareholders, including a 20% stake from Pathé Interactive (joint-venture between Phillips Media and Chargeurs) and 3.3% by Productions Marcel Dassault. By August, Phillips Media acquired Chargeurs' stake in Pathé Interactive, which led to the 20% shareholding stake of the company transferring fully over to Phillips.

=== Growth through acquisition (1996–2003) ===
In 1996, Infogrames embarked on an acquisition campaign that would last seven years and cost more than $500 million; the objective was to become the world's leading interactive entertainment publisher. While the company's debt increased from $55 million in 1999 to $493 million in 2002, the company's revenue also increased from $246 million to $650 million during the same period.

In July 1996, the company announced that it would purchase the British-based holding company Ocean International Ltd. for $100 million, beginning Infogrames' status as a major publisher. Ocean International consisted of British developer and publisher Ocean Software and its North American division Ocean of America. After the deal was closed, Ocean became a standalone subsidiary of Infogrames and continued releasing its own titles distant from those of Infogrames. Both Ocean subsidiaries soon became the official distributors for Infogrames in both territories.

In 1997, Infogrames Télématique launched Oceanline, a website that would offer simplified online versions of Infogrames titles. On 3 February, Infogrames announced that they would purchase the French division of Phillips Media BV for 191.5 million F with the deal closing on 9 June. Phillips Media France, in addition to holding a 20% shareholding stake in Infogrames, also owned the distributors Ecudis (France), Leisuresoft (UK), Bomico Entertainment Software (Germany and Holland), and German publisher Laguna Video Games. Leisuresoft was however not included in the sale, and was shuttered following the purchase. In October 1997, Infogrames announced to set up a subsidiary in India for the South East Asian market, mentioning interest in Thailand.

On 30 January 1998, Infogrames signed a licensing deal with Warner Bros. Interactive Entertainment to publish and develop five titles based on the Looney Tunes franchise. On 8 February, Infogrames rebranded its subsidiaries under its own banner, with Ocean Software becoming Infogrames United Kingdom, Ocean of America becoming Infogrames Entertainment, Inc. and Bomico Entertainment Software becoming Infogrames Deutschland. On the same day, the company announced a two-year distribution deal with Canal+ Multimedia to distribute the company's titles in the UK, France and Germany. Later on in the year the company purchased the distributors ABS Multimedia, Arcadia, and the Swiss Gamecity GmbH and ending the year off with the purchase of a 62.5% in Australian game distributor Ozisoft, following its then-recent relinquishment from Sega.

On 10 February 1999, Infogrames extended its partnership with Canal+ Multimedia by purchasing a 50% stake in the publisher, with the intentions to invest 50 million F into creating titles based on Canal+'s licenses. Infogrames made major purchases for 1999, beginning in March with the purchase of the Gremlin Group for $40 million in March, who owned developers Gremlin Interactive and DMA Design, with Gremlin rebranding as Infogrames Sheffield House. On 5 April, Psygnosis' Paris development studio was purchased. The company's first major purchase of the year came on 20 April, with the purchase of publisher Accolade for $60 million in order to gain a major North American distribution network. Accolade was rebranded as Infogrames North America, with the company's former North American distribution arm (the ex-Ocean of America) being folded into it. On 24 June, the company extended its Looney Tunes licensing deal with Warner Bros. Interactive Entertainment for five years, with a maximum of twenty titles. Later on in the year, the company purchased the video game division of the Australian-based Beam Software, and rebranded it as Infogrames Melbourne House. On 29 September, Take-Two Interactive purchased DMA Design from Infogrames for US$11 million and transitioned it over to their Rockstar Games subsidiary, soon becoming Rockstar North.

In December 1999, Infogrames made their then-largest purchase with the acquisition of a 70% stake in publisher GT Interactive Software for $135 million, and assumed GT's $75 million bank debt. IESA justified the purchase by stating that GT Interactive provided Infogrames with a "distribution network for all of its products in the United States, as well as a catalog of products that includes Driver, Duke Nukem, Oddworld, Unreal Tournament and Deer Hunter. The deal also included the developers SingleTrac, Humongous Entertainment, Cavedog Entertainment, WizardWorks, MacSoft, Legend Entertainment and Reflections Interactive.

Infogrames began the new millennium of 2000 with a new identity and branding, while in February GT closed down Cavedog Entertainment as part of its restructuring. In June, The company invested another $30 million in GT Interactive, and renamed the publisher as Infogrames, Inc. On 30 June, Infogrames purchased developer Paradigm Entertainment for $19.5 million and placed them within Infogrames, Inc. operations. and soon afterwards purchased in-flight games developer Den-o-Tech Int. (DTI) for $5.6 million, renaming them as Infogrames DTI. Infogrames was also one of the interested companies in purchasing Eidos Interactive.

On 7 September 2000, Infogrames announced a licensing deal with Warner Bros. Interactive Entertainment and DC Comics to publish Superman video games.

On 6 December 2000, board game manufacturer Hasbro announced that they would sell their struggling Hasbro Interactive division to Infogrames for $100 million, $95 million as 4.5 million common shares of Infogrames and $5 million in cash. The deal included all of Hasbro Interactive's product library, the Atari and MicroProse brands and titles such as Civilization, Falcon, RollerCoaster Tycoon, Centipede, Missile Command, and Pong, MicroProse's owned developers, the Games.com web portal, third-party video game licenses including Thomas the Tank Engine, Family Feud and various Namco properties, as well as a fifteen-year licensing deal to develop and publish titles based on Hasbro IP such as Dungeons & Dragons, Monopoly, Mr. Potato Head and My Little Pony, with an option for an additional 5 years based on performance. The deal did not include Avalon Hill, which was retained by Hasbro. The deal was closed on 29 January 2001, and Hasbro Interactive was rebranded as Infogrames Interactive, Inc.

On 2 October 2001, Infogrames announced that they would reinvent the Atari brand as a second major publishing label with the launch of three new games featuring prominent Atari branding on their boxarts: Splashdown, MX Rider and TransWorld Surf. Infogrames titles released under the Atari brand would focus within a core 18-34-year-old male audience, while children's and casual games would retain the Infogrames banner. In November 2001, Frédéric Chesnais became Deputy CEO.

In April 2002, the company's Japanese division Infogrames Japan K.K. signed a Japanese distribution deal with Konami for select titles and soon relaunched the Atari brand in the country with the publication of Splashdown, TransWorld Surf and V-Rally 3 in the region. On 28 August, Infogrames purchased the remaining shares in OziSoft for $3.7 million and rebranded the distributor as Infogrames Australia and Infogrames New Zealand. On 12 September 2002, Infogrames announced the closure of MicroProse's UK studio, then named Infogrames Chippenham. On 2 October, the company closed Infogrames Lyon House. and on 22 October, had acquired the remaining 80% of Eden Studios for $4.1 million,. In the fiscal year of 2002, IESA had a net loss of $67 million on revenues of $650 million, and in 2003 the net losses increased to $89 million.

On 1 May, the company shuttered the Infogrames Sheffield House development studio.

=== Rebranding subsidiaries to Atari (2003–2008) ===
Atari logo used by Infogrames from 2003 to 2010

On 7 May 2003, Infogrames officially reorganized all its subsidiaries under the Atari banner. Its two publishing divisions in the United States – Infogrames, Inc., based in Santa Monica (the former GT Interactive) which handled a majority of the company's "core" titles such as Enter the Matrix, Dungeons and Dragons (including Neverwinter Nights) and other movie tie-ins, was rebranded as Atari, Inc., and Infogrames Interactive, Inc., based in Beverly, Massachusetts, which focused on children's and casual titles such as games based on the Dragon Ball franchise and their Hasbro license, was renamed Atari Interactive, Inc., merging with the previously existing Atari Interactive, Inc. which held all rights to the Atari brand. Other subsidiaries that rebranded included Infogrames Australia Pty, Ltd. rebranding as Atari Australia Pty, Ltd., Infogrames United Kingdom Limited rebranding as Atari United Kingdom Limited, Infogrames Europe rebranding as Atari Europe and development studio Infogrames Melbourne House Pty Ltd becoming Atari Melbourne House Pty Ltd. The Infogrames Entertainment SA company as a whole remained under its name, and became a holding company for the Atari assets. Atari, Inc.'s majority shareholder was California U.S. Holdings, Inc., a wholly owned subsidiary of Infogrames Entertainment SA. and had exclusive publishing and sublicensing in North America to release titles from Infogrames or its subsidiaries, including Atari Interactive.

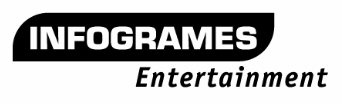
Infogrames Entertainment logo until the 2009 rebranding

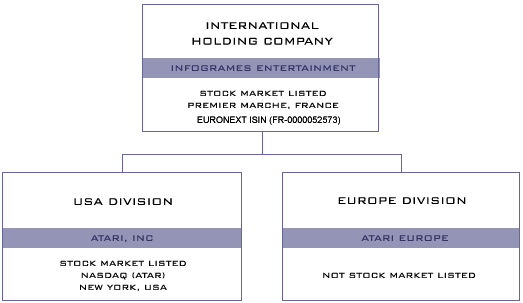
An official simplified organizational chart of the company as of end 2005

Throughout 2003 and 2004, Infogrames and Atari continued to close studios and divested intellectual properties. On 2 October 2003, Zoo Digital Publishing, a then-new publisher founded by Gremlin Interactive co-founder Ian Stewart, announced that they had acquired the assets of Gremlin Interactive from Infogrames for an undisclosed one-off payment. The deal included all of Gremlin's catalogue alongside their brand, logo and trademark. On 25 November 2004, Infogrames announced they had sold the Civilization franchise to an undisclosed buyer for $22.3 million which was revealed to be Take-Two Interactive in January 2005. On 2 May, after signing a new deal with Firaxis Games, 2K fully acquired the Civilization back catalog as well as the publishing rights to the then-recent Sid Meier's Pirates! from Infogrames.

On 9 June 2005, Hasbro announced it had purchased back Atari's exclusive digital gaming rights to its properties for $65 million. In exchange for the deal, Atari acquired a seven-year exclusive agreement to publish titles based on select Hasbro board game properties, alongside a separate deal for the Dungeons & Dragons license. On 22 August, Atari, Inc. sold Humongous, Inc. to Infogrames Entertainment SA for shares worth US$10.3 million. With this, Infogrames laid off all remaining employees at the company with possible plans to relaunch the company's IP. Atari would continue to distribute the company's titles for a period until March 2006, and was later extended to March 2007.

On 5 September 2006, David Pierce was appointed as new CEO of Atari, replacing Bruno Bonnell. Pierce previously worked as an executive at Universal Pictures, Metro-Goldwyn-Mayer, Sony Pictures, Sony Music, and Sony Wonder. In April 2007, Infogrames' founding chairman Bruno Bonnell left the company after 24 years; on the day of the announcement of his departure IESA's shares jumped 24%. In the same year, Infogrames fired the majority of Atari's directors and laid off 20% of its workforce. For the 2006–2007 fiscal year, Atari posted a net loss of $70 million. In July 2007, Atari sold their exclusive licensing deal with Hasbro back to them for $19 million, which concluded with Hasbro signing a new casual game deal with Electronic Arts a month later.

=== Merger with Atari, Inc. and asset selling to Namco Bandai Games (2008–2009) ===
On 6 March 2008, Infogrames made an offer to Atari Inc. to buy out all remaining public shares for a value of US$1.68 per share or US$11 million total. The offer would make Infogrames the sole owner of Atari Inc., making it a privately held company. On 30 April, Atari Inc. announced its intentions to accept Infogrames' buyout offer and merge with Infogrames, which was completed by 9 October. With that acquisition Infogrames was the only owner of the Atari brand. Infogrames said that it planned to reduce administrative costs and to focus on online gaming. On 9 May 2008, it was revealed that NASDAQ would be removing Atari from the NASDAQ stock exchange. Atari has stated its intentions to appeal the decision. Atari was notified of NASDAQ's final decision on 24 April 2008, and the appeal hearing took place on 1 May 2008. Atari was expected to raise its value to $15 million USD from the period of 20 December 2007 through to March 2008. Atari received notice of its absolute delisting on 12 September 2008.

In September 2008, Namco Bandai Games, who had been attempting to gain a PAL distribution network since their merger in 2006, announced that they had entered into a joint venture with Infogrames/Atari called Distribution Partners. The venture, with Atari holding a 66% stake and Namco Bandai holding a 34% stake, would consolidate Atari's entire distribution network outside of North America and Japan into a single business with exclusive physical packaged-goods distribution rights for video games produced by Namco Bandai and Infogrames within Europe, Asia, South America, Oceania and Africa.

In December 2008, Infogrames bought Cryptic Studios for $26.7 million in cash plus performance bonuses. Cryptic Studios is a massively multiplayer online game developer, and its acquisition is in line with the company's new business strategy which focuses on online games. Despite restructuring, Infogrames continued to struggle to become profitable. For the 2008 fiscal year, the company posted €51.1 million ($72.17 million) in net losses, and for the 2009 fiscal year, which ended in March, Infogrames posted losses of €226.1 million ($319.33 million).

In March 2009, Infogrames Entertainment SA announced that as part of its new focus on developing and publishing games for the MMO market it would completely exit the PAL-region distribution arm and would sell its 66% stake at Distribution Partners over to Namco Bandai Games Europe. According to an Infogrames press-release, this sale allowed "Atari to focus its financial resources and creative energy exclusively on developing and publishing online-enabled games". In May 2009, it was revealed that the assets of Atari Europe, which Namco Bandai purchased a 34% stake in, would also be folded into their own operations. Its sale and marketing personnel were transferred to Distribution Partners. The deal, valued at €37 million was closed on 7 July and Distribution Partners' entire operations were rebranded as Namco Bandai Partners, with Atari holding a five-year distribution deal for the rebranded company to exclusively distribute their titles in those territories. At that time the company had operations in 50 countries and 17 dedicated offices. The first title published by Atari under the new distribution agreement with Namco Bandai was Champions Online.

=== Rebranding to Atari SA (2009–2013) ===
During their fiscal year meeting in May 2009, IESA announced that it would be changing its corporate name to an Atari branded name, in line with the use of the name for its subsidiaries. In reference to this, Atari, Inc.'s CEO Jim Wilson said: "We've gotten rid of the Infogrames and Atari duality, the confusion around that. We are one simplified company, under one management team, under one brand."

Infogrames' 29 May earnings report stated:

"The Board agreed to change Infogrames Entertainment's name to Atari. This decision will enable us to make the best use of the Atari brand, capitalising on worldwide strong name recognition and affinity, which are keys drivers to implement the Company's online, product and licensing strategies."

An earnings press release on 24 July 2009 also provided clarification regarding the ensuing name change that was initially announced some two months prior, rebranding themselves as Atari, SA from Infogrames Entertainment, SA. Furthermore, this release also stated their intentions of henceforth utilising the much more recognisable 'Atari Group' moniker with all Atari-related brands and similar such subsidiaries already under their control.

On 21 October 2010, Atari announced Atari's reference shareholders BlueBay Value Recovery (Master) Fund Limited and BlueBay Multi-Strategy (Master) Fund Limited are exploring a disposal of the shares and equity-linked instruments held by them. However, BlueBay shareholders later interrupted the sale process of its holding in Atari. BlueBay later converted the conversion of a portion of the ORANEs held by them.

On 4 April 2012, Glu Mobile acquired the Deer Hunter franchise from Atari. On 12 April, Eden Games began negotiations as an attempt to separate from Atari SA following a prior strike after Atari laid off a majority of the studios' employees the prior April. On 28 September, Atari, SA, BlueBay Value Recovery (Master) Fund Limited, and The BlueBay Multi-Strategy (Master) Fund Limited reached an agreement following their negotiations regarding the restructuring of the debt and capital structure of the Atari group. As part of the agreement, the €20.9 million Credit Facility Agreement was extinguished via €10.9 million loan forgiveness from BlueBay Value Recovery (Master) Fund Limited and Atari's payment of €10 million; the cancellation of the dilutive effect of the ORANEs held by BlueBay; €20 million capital increases to be submitted to the vote of Atari shareholders (of which €10 million with preferential subscription right).

=== Chapter 11 bankruptcy and auction (2013–2014) ===
On 21 January 2013, the North American divisions of Atari SA – Atari, Inc., Atari Interactive, Inc., Humongous, Inc. and California US Holdings, Inc. all filed petitions for relief under Chapter 11 of the United States Bankruptcy Code in the United States Bankruptcy Court for the Southern District of New York. The following week on 29 January, Eden Games filed for judicial liquidation, effectively closing the studio down. On 23 May, Atari announced that they would sell their game assets, developers, the famous "Fuji" logo, and the Atari name in a bankruptcy auction. Prior to the bankruptcy sale in July, Nordic Games purchased the Desperados franchise and Silver on 24 June while Appeal Studios purchased the full rights to Outcast on 4 July.

The company's bankruptcy sale took place on 22 July 2013, leading to different titles gaining new homes. A majority of Atari's assets were sold to Tommo, which included a portfolio of over 100 titles and IPs mostly belonging to Accolade and MicroProse, Atari's Math Gran Prix, Humongous Entertainment's "Junior Adventure" titles, and the Accolade and GT Interactive brands. Other companies that bought assets were Rebellion Developments purchasing Atari's Battlezone franchise and Humongous title MoonBase Commander, Devolver Digital purchasing Marc Ecko's Getting Up: Contents Under Pressure, Epic Gear LLC (and later Day 6 Sports Group LLC) purchasing the Backyard Sports franchise, Wargaming purchasing the Total Annihilation and Master of Orion franchises, and Stardock purchasing Star Control. The Test Drive franchise and publishing rights to the RollerCoaster Tycoon franchise were also put up for sale, although no bids were offered for either franchise. In October, Eden Games reopened as an independent developer by its founder, David Nadal.

=== Turnaround strategy and continuing sale of assets (2014–2020) ===
In 2014, all three of the North American Atari subsidiaries emerged from bankruptcy under the ownership of Frédéric Chesnais, who headed the slimmed-down companies with their entire operations consisting of a staff of 10 people. Atari announced in March that they had entered the social casino gaming industry with the launch of Atari Casino. In 2015, Atari announced a new turnaround strategy that would focus on "download games, MMO games, mobile games and licensing activities, based in priority around traditional franchises." Projects within the strategy included Alone in the Dark: Illumination, RollerCoaster Tycoon World, and a mobile game based on Lunar Lander.

On 14 December 2016, fellow-French publisher Bigben Interactive announced they had purchased the Test Drive IP and brand from Atari. The deal would allow for Bigben to publish new video games under the property, while Atari would retain all rights to all previous entries.

On 3 January 2017, TMZ reported that Frontier Developments, the developer for RollerCoaster Tycoon 3, sued Atari, Inc. for not paying the company enough for royalties for the game; Frontier reported that they only received $1.17 million when they needed $3.37 million. Frontier's Chief Operating Officer David Walsh confirmed the report in a GameSpot interview, stating that they had previously attempted to resolve the issue without legal action since April 2016. In 2017, Piko Interactive acquired several titles from Atari: 40 Winks, Bubble Ghost, Chamber of the Sci-Mutant Priestess, Death Gate, Drakkhen, Eternam, Glover, Monty Mole, Hostage: Rescue Mission, Marco Polo and Time Gate: Knight's Chase. On 8 June, a short teaser video was released, promoting a new product; and the following week CEO Fred Chesnais confirmed the company was developing a new game console – the hardware was stated to be based on PC technology, and be still under development.

In mid July 2017, an Atari press release confirmed the existence of new hardware, referred to as the Ataribox. The casing design was inspired by the original Atari 2600, with a ribbed top surface, and a rise at the back of the console. According to an official company statement of 22 June 2017 the product was to initially launch via a crowdfunding campaign in order to minimize financial risk to the parent company. In March 2018, the Ataribox was renamed the Atari VCS and it was released in June 2021. It was developed by a new subsidiary based in the U.S., named Atari VCS, LLC. Within the same month, it was revealed that Atari had also sold the V-Rally series to BigBen Interactive with an announcement of a new entry in the franchise from the latter. On 19 September, THQ Nordic announced they had acquired the Alone in the Dark franchise and Act of War.

=== New leadership and refocus on retro gaming (2020–2026) ===
In March 2020, Wade Rosen, the founder of Ziggurat Interactive, became the new chair of the board of directors upon purchasing a substantial share of the company from Chesnais. Within that year, the company launched the Atari Token cryptocurrency, in equal partnership with the ICICB Group. The group was licensed to launch an online gaming platform using crypto currencies, including the Atari Token. Also, Ziggurat Interactive acquired dozens of ex-Atari-owned titles, including Deadly Dozen.

In March 2021, Atari extended its partnership with ICICB Group for the development of Atari branded hotels, with the first hotels to be constructed in Dubai, Gibraltar and Spain. The licensing agreement includes potential additional countries in Europe, Africa, and Asia. In April, Rosen replaced Chesnais as CEO and restructured the company into two units: Atari Gaming, who will focus on video games, and Atari Blockchain, who will focus on blockchain and other businesses. On 5 July 2021, Atari Gaming announced a plan to fully reenter the console and handheld game publishing industry and reduce emphasis on free-to-play and mobile games, leading to possible titles being closed or sold, alongside the closure of Atari Casino. Chesnais later resigned from the company, though remained as a consultant through his new company, Crypto Blockchain Industries (CBI). On 24 November, Atari announced they had invested $500,000 in retro gaming streaming platform Antstream, and a deal to potentially purchase MobyGames for $1.5 million through to the end of March 2022. The purchase was completed on 8 March 2022, with Freyholtz remaining as general manager.

In March 2022, Atari ended all ties with former CEO Chesnais and CBI. The following month, they also announced the termination of all license agreements with ICICB, including the end of hotel licenses, and the dissolution of their blockchain joint venture. The Atari Token was disclaimed as "unlicensed" and a replacement would be developed.

With these changes, Atari began to shift focus to focus on retro gaming. According to Rosen, the shift was predicated on the company's overly broad goals and trying to take on large mobile publishers like Supercell and King, and with their resources spread across so many ventures, they could not readily compete. Instead, they opted to decide to focus on one area and be the best at that, and moved that focus onto retro games. Already having dropped their cryptocurrency attempts, Atari wound down their mobile games approach and other ventures not part of the retro gaming approach.

In 2023, Atari began a series of IP acquisitions. In March, they acquired the intellectual property rights to 12 Stern Electronics titles, including Berzerk and Frenzy. Later that month, Atari announced that it would acquire Nightdive Studios for $10 million. Nightdive had released several ports and remasters of Atari's divested games. The following month, they had re-acquired over one hundred video games from the Accolade, MicroProse, GT Interactive, and Infogrames catalogues that were formerly owned by Tommo/Billionsoft. This included the Bubsy series and the Accolade and GT Interactive brands. In May, the company obtained rights for over a dozen M Network games, including Armor Ambush, Astroblast, Frogs and Flies, Space Attack, and Star Strike. Within the latter part of 2023, the company also formed a partnership with and made a minority investment into Playmaji, Inc. the company behind the Polymega retro console, acquired AtariAge, a website dedicated to the history of Atari games, Awesomenauts and Swords & Soldiers from Ronimo Games and Digital Eclipse, a developer that specialized in remakes of older games.

On 2 April 2024, Atari re-purchased the publishing rights to RollerCoaster Tycoon 3 from Frontier Developments as part of RollerCoaster Tycoon's 25th anniversary, giving Atari full publishing control of the series once more. Later that month, Atari relaunched the Infogrames brand as a publishing label to publish titles that fall outside the Atari brand, along with the acquisition of Totally Reliable Delivery Service from tinyBuild, to be published under the new label. Atari also took a 7.9% ownership stake in tinyBuild around the same time. On 23 May, Atari announced the acquisition of the Intellivision brand name and its game library from Intellivision Entertainment. This respective company and the Amico console were not included in the sale, and would be renamed. The company would secure a licensing deal with Atari to continue to release updated versions of the Intellivision catalog on the system. On 1 November, Atari acquired Transport Tycoon from Chris Sawyer

Atari planned a 50 million kr investment into the Thunderful Group in July 2025, which would give Atari around 82% of the controlling shares in the company. As part of this acquisition, Atari plans to restructure Thunderful and its five studios. The $5.3 million deal was closed at the end of the following month. Also in August, Atari and Ubisoft agreed to transfer the IP of five Ubisoft titles, Cold Fear, I Am Alive, Child of Eden, Grow Home and Grow Up to Atari.

In February 2026, Atari agreed to purchase an additional controlling share in the Thunderful Group, owning 90.2% of the company.

=== Relocation to Luxembourg (2026–present) ===
At the end of February 2026, the company's shareholders agreed to relocate the company from France to Luxembourg. The deal was completed on 7 July, with Atari SA becoming a public limited company incorporated in Luxembourg, but remains listed on Euronext Growth Paris.

Before the move, Atari acquired Implicit Conversions, a developer specializing in remastering older titles for modern platforms, in April The same month, the company acquired the rights to the first five games in the Wizardry series and the underlying intellectual property, with plans to republish the games, develop remasters, and create new titles in the series. and later acquired Australian mobile game developer Hipster Whale at the beginning of June.

== Subsidiaries ==
=== Current ===
Name	Formed/Became subsidiary	Location	Purpose	Ref.
AtariAge	2023	United States	A website that documents Atari, its history, consoles, and games.	
Atari, Inc.	1999	New York City, United States	North American publishing and distribution arm. It was acquired as GT Interactive in 1999, and renamed to Infogrames, Inc. in 2000. Initially, Infogrames held a 70% majority stake in the publisher, with the rest held publicly on the Nasdaq Composite. Following the purchase, Atari, Inc. exclusively published and distributed products from Atari/Atari Europe in North America, and vice versa for other territories. Infogrames fully purchased the company in April 2008 and became a fully-owned subsidiary from then on.	
Atari Interactive	2001	New York City, United States	Copyright holder for Atari properties and IP. They were acquired from Hasbro as Hasbro Interactive, Inc., renamed Infogrames Interactive, Inc. after the sale closed. Afterward, they ceased as a full publisher and transitioned to a copyright holder, with their games being released by Atari, Inc. and Atari/Atari Europe, respectively.	
Atari VCS, LLC	2017	United States	Holding business for the Atari VCS microconsole.	
Digital Eclipse	2023	Emeryville, United States	Game developer that mainly develops compilations of retro games.	
GT Interactive, LLC	2023	New York City, United States	Copyright holder for select titles purchased from Tommo and Billionsoft.	
Hipster Whale	2026	The Arcade, Melbourne, Australia	A mobile video game developer best known for developing Crossy Road.	
Implicit Conversions	2026	Middletown, United States	A developer who ports older titles to newer platforms.	
Infogrames, LLC	2024	New York City, United States	Operates the Infogrames publishing label, which releases games that fall out of the core portfolio of IP associated with the Atari brand.	
MobyGames	2022	United States	A commercial video game database website. Acquired from Blue Flame Labs.	
Nightdive Studios	2023	Vancouver, United States	Developer and publisher that focuses on re-releasing remakes and/or remasters of retro games.	
tinyBuild	2024	Bellevue, Washington	Publisher of indie games. Atari SA holds a 7.9% share in the company.	
Thunderful Group	2025	Gothenburg, Sweden	A video game holding company that owns many developers and publishers. Atari SA initially took an 82% majority stake in the company, increasing to 90%, and eventually full ownership.	

=== Dormant ===
Name	Formed/Became subsidiary	Location	Purpose	Ref.
Atari Europe S.A.S.U.	1987	Lyon, France	European distribution subsidiary. Originally a multimedia-centric division called Infogrames Multimedia SA which handled the development of CD-ROM-based titles, before becoming the company's European distribution branch and being renamed to Infogrames Europe by 2000. It has been dormant since the sale of its subsidiaries to Namco Bandai Games, with Atari distributing its products through other companies.	
Atari Japan KK	2000	Japan	Japanese publishing and distribution arm, initially formed as a joint-venture with Hudson Soft entitled Infogrames-Hudson. They were not included in the Namco Bandai Games sale and became dormant afterward.	

=== Former ===
Name	Headquarters	Founded	Acquired	Divested	Former Name(s)	Fate	Notable releases
A+ Multimedia Ltda	Portugal	—	—	2009	—	Sold to Namco Bandai Games	—
Atari Australia Pty, Ltd.	Sydney, Australia	1982	1998 (Stake); 2002 (Full)	2009	Ozisoft Pty, Ltd. (1982-1991, 1999-2002); Sega Ozisoft Pty, Ltd. (1992-1998); Infogrames Australia Pty Ltd. (2002-2003)	Sold to Namco Bandai Games, currently named Bandai Namco Entertainment Australia	Distributor for Sega consoles and software in the country, alongside other publishers (i.e., Konami)
Atari Asia Pacific Pty, Ltd.	Australia	2000	—	2009	Infogrames Asia Pacific Pty, Ltd. (2000-2003)	Liquidated	—
Atari Benelux B.V.	Netherlands	1994	—	2009	Infogrames Benelux (1994-2003)	Sold to Namco Bandai Games, renamed to Namco Bandai Partners Benelux	Distributor for publishers in the territory (i.e. Acclaim Entertainment)
Atari Deutschland GmbH	Germany	1986	1997	2009	Bomico Entertainment Software (1986-1998); Infogrames Deutschland GmbH (1998-2003)	Part of the Philips Media purchase. Sold to Namco Bandai Games, currently named Bandai Namco Entertainment Germany	Distributor for publishers in Germany, Austria and Switzerland
Atari do Brasil Ltda.	Brazil	1998	—	2009	Infogrames do Brasil Ltda. (1998-2003)	Sold to Namco Bandai Games, renamed to Namco Bandai Partners Brasil	Distributor for publishers in the country
Atari France S.A.S.	France	1991	—	2009	Infogrames France (1991-2003)	Sold to Namco Bandai Games, currently named Bandai Namco Entertainment France	Distributor for publishers in the country
Atari Hellas EURL	Greece	2000	—	2009	Infogrames Hellas EPE (2000-2003)	Sold to Namco Bandai Games, currently named Bandai Namco Entertainment Hellas	Distributor for publishers in the country
Atari Hong Kong Ltd.	Hong Kong	Unknown	—	2009	—	Sold and folded by Namco Bandai Games	Distributor for publishers in the territory
Atari Ibérica S.A.	Spain	2000	—	2009	Infogrames Ibérica Distribución, S.A. (2000-2003)	Sold to Namco Bandai Games, currently named Bandai Namco Entertainment Ibérica	Distributor for publishers in Spain, Portugal and the Canary Islands
Atari Italia S.p.A.	Italy	1994	—	2009	Infogrames Italia SpA (2000-2003)	Sold to Namco Bandai Games, currently named Bandai Namco Entertainment Italy	Distributor for publishers in Italy and Malta
Atari Israel Ltd.	Israel	Unknown	—	2009	—	Sold to Namco Bandai Games, later renamed Namco Bandai Partners Israel.	Distributor for publishers in the territory
Atari Korea Ltd.	South Korea	Unknown	—	2009	—	Sold and folded by Namco Bandai Games	Distributor for publishers in the country
Atari Melbourne House Pty Ltd.	Melbourne, Australia	1980	1999	2006	Beam Software (1980–1993); Laser Beam Entertainment (1993–1997); Melbourne House (1997-1999); Infogrames Melbourne House Pty Ltd. (1999–2003)	Owned by Infogrames, operated and represented by Atari, Inc. Sold to Krome Studios	Le Mans 24 Hours, Transformers
Atari Nordic AB	Spånga, Sweden	2000	—	2009	Infogrames Nordic AB (2000-2003)	Sold to Namco Bandai Games, currently named Bandai Namco Entertainment Nordic	Distributor for publishers in Denmark, Finland, Norway and Sweden
Atari NZ Limited	New Zealand	1990	1998 (Stake); 2002 (Full)	2009	Ozisoft NZ Ltd. (1990-2002) Infogrames New Zealand Ltd. (2002-2003)	Sold to Namco Bandai Games, currently named Bandai Namco Entertainment NZ	Distributor for Sega consoles and software in the country, alongside other publishers (i.e., Konami)
Atari Singapore Pty, Ltd.	Singapore	Unknown	—	2009	—	Sold and folded by Namco Bandai Games	Distributor for publishers in the country
Atari Taiwan Ltd.	Taiwan	Unknown	—	2009	—	Sold and folded by Namco Bandai Games	Distributor for publishers in the country
Atari United Kingdom Limited	Manchester, England	1983	1996	2009	Ocean Software Limited (1983-1998); Infogrames United Kingdom Limited (1998-2003)	Originally the publisher Ocean Software. Included in the Ocean International purchase. Sold to Namco Bandai Games, currently named Bandai Namco Entertainment UK.	Distributor for publishers in the country
Atari Studios Asia Pty, Ltd.	Australia	1999	—	2012	Infogrames Holdings Australia Pty, Ltd. Infogrames Studio Asia Pty, Ltd. Infogrames Studio Asia Pty, Ltd.	Liquidated	—
Cryptic Studios	Los Gatos, United States	2000	2008	2011	—	Sold to Perfect World	Champions Online, Star Trek Online
Distribution Partners SAS	France	2008	—	2009	—	A consolidation of Atari's PAL region distribution networks into a single business. Joint venture with Namco Bandai Games that was purchased out by them in 2009	—
DMA Design	Dundee, Scotland	1988	1999	1999	—	Included in Gremlin Interactive purchase, immediately sold to Take-Two Interactive after sale	Grand Theft Auto series, Lemmings, Tanktics
Eden Games	Lyon, France	1998	2002	2013	Eden Studios (1998-2002)	Held a minority stake before full purchase. Filed for judicial liquidation	V-Rally series, Test Drive Unlimited and its sequel, Alone in the Dark (2008)
Humongous, Inc.	United States	1992	2005	2013	Humongous Entertainment, Inc. (1992-2005)	Purchased from Atari, Inc., the copyright holder for the remains of developer Humongous Entertainment and its assets. Dissolved during the 2013 bankruptcy, most assets were sold to Tommo	Putt-Putt, Freddi Fish, Pajama Sam, Spy Fox, Backyard Sports series
I•Motion, Inc.	Santa Monica, California, United States	1990s	—	1998	—	Folded into Infogrames Entertainment, Inc.	—
Infogrames Entertainment, Inc.	San Jose, United States	unknown	1996	1999	Ocean of America, Inc. (1990s-1998)	Included in the purchase of Ocean International. Folded into Infogrames North America, Inc.	—
Infogrames España	Madrid, Spain	Unknown	—	2000	—	folded into Infogrames Iberica	Distributor for publishers in the territory (i.e. Midway Games)
Infogrames Lyon House	Lyon, France	1998	—	2002	—	Closed	Sheep, Dog 'n' Wolf, Worms Armageddon (N64/GBC)
Infogrames North America, Inc.	San Jose, United States	1984	1999	2000	Accolade, Inc. (1984-1999)	folded into Infogrames, Inc.	Bubsy series, Test Drive series, HardBall! series
Infogrames Studios Limited	Sheffield, United Kingdom	1984	1999	2003	Gremlin Graphics Software Limited (1984–1994); Gremlin Interactive Limited (1994–2000)	Closed, assets sold to Zoo Digital Publishing	Actua Sports series, Premier Manager series, Hogs of War
Infogrames Portugal	Portugal	Unknown	—	2000	—	Folded into Infogrames Iberica	Distributor for publishers in the territory (i.e. Midway Games)
Laguna Videospiele Vertriebs & Marketing GmbH	Germany	1990	1997	1998	—	Owned by Bomico Entertainment Software, folded into their operations shortly after the Infogrames purchase of Philips Media	Publisher and distributor of games in Europe (i.e. Sunsoft and Capcom)
Philips Media France	France	unknown	1997	1997	—	Former French division of Philips Media BV. Folded following purchase	Distribution of CD-i

== Game franchises owned by Atari SA ==
As of 2018, Atari SA owns the rights to the following games and game franchises. The majority of these are original works by Atari, Hasbro Interactive or Infogrames, however the most notable outside of these are a large number of intellectual properties formerly belonging to Accolade, Inc., GT Interactive, and Ocean Software, to which Atari SA never lost the rights. Some former franchises, such as Test Drive and Alone in the Dark, have since been sold.

=== Original IPs ===
- Citytopia (Atari, Inc.)
- Days of Doom (Atari, Inc.)
- Lunar Battle (Atari, Inc.)
- Mob Empire (Atari, Inc.)

=== Titles from Atari, Inc. (1972–1984) ===
- Adventure
- Air-Sea Battle
- Asteroids
- Atari Video Cube
- Avalanche
- Basketball
- Black Widow
- Breakout
- Canyon Bomber
- Caverns of Mars
- Centipede
- Circus
- Combat
- Crystal Castles
- Desert Falcon
- Destroyer
- Food Fight
- Football
- Gravitar
- Haunted House
- I, Robot
- Indy
- Jet Fighter
- Liberator
- Lunar Lander
- Maze Craze
- Missile Command
- Miniature Golf
- Night Driver
- Outlaw
- Pong
- Quadrun
- RealSports
- Red Baron
- Save Mary
- Sky Diver
- Sprint 2
- Star Raiders
- Stellar Track
- Steeplechase
- Submarine Commander
- Swordquest
- Tank
- Tempest
- Video Olympics
- Warlords
- Yars' Revenge

=== Titles from Atari Corporation ===
- Alien Brigade
- Atari Karts
- Club Drive
- Cybermorph
- Desert Falcon
- Dracula the Undead
- Fatal Run
- Fight for Life
- Hover Strike
- Ninja Golf
- Secret Quest
- Ultra Vortek
- Warbirds

=== Titles from Accolade ===
- Bubsy
- Demolition Racer

=== Titles from GT Interactive ===
- Bedlam

=== Titles from Ocean Software ===
- Cheesy
- Fighters Destiny
- Hunchback
- Match Day
- Mr. Nutz
- Where Time Stood Still
- Wizball

=== Titles from Infogrames ===
- Alpha Waves
- Lee Enfield
- Metal Masters
- Zapper: One Wicked Cricket
- Starshot: Space Circus Fever

=== Titles from MicroProse ===
- Gunship
- Gunship 2000

=== Titles from Hasbro Interactive ===
- BloodNet
- Gunship!
- RollerCoaster Tycoon

=== Titles from Nightdive Studios ===
- I Have No Mouth, and I Must Scream
- Noctropolis
- PowerSlave
- Sin
- Strife
- System Shock

=== Titles from Intellivision ===
- Sea Battle
- Night Stalker
- Star Strike

=== Titles from Stern Electronics ===
- Anteater
- Berzerk
- Frenzy

=== Titles from tinyBuild ===
- Surgeon Simulator
- Totally Reliable Delivery Service

=== Titles from Ronimo Games ===
- Awesomenauts
- Swords & Soldiers

=== Titles from Ubisoft ===
- Child of Eden
- Cold Fear
- Grow Home
- Grow Up
- I Am Alive

=== Other ===
- Bread & Fred (Apogee Entertainment)
- Crossy Road (Hipster Whale)
- Gateway (Legend Entertainment)
- Section 8 (Timegate Studios)
- Transport Tycoon (Chris Sawyer)
- Wizardry (Only early instruments, Series itself still own by Drecom)
