= Implicit Conversions =

Video game developer

Implicit Conversions, Inc.
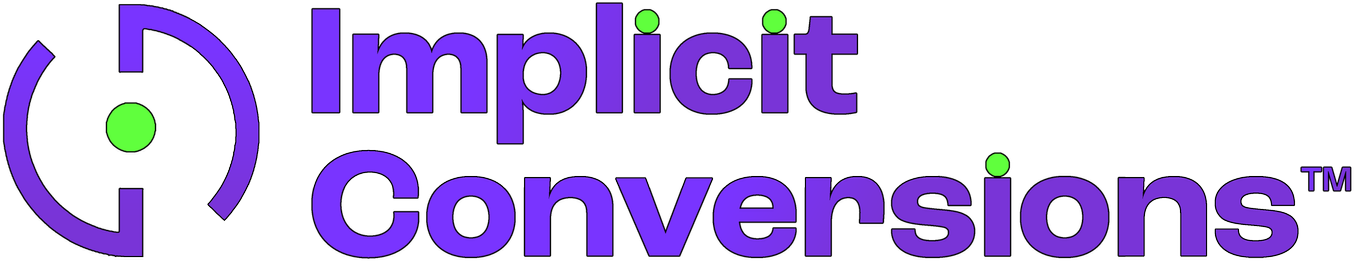
- Type: Subsidiary
- Industry: Video games
- Founded: 2019; 7 years ago
- Founder: Jake Stine; Robin Lavallée
- Key people: Robin Lavallée (Studio Head); Bill Litshauer (Head of Operations)
- Products: Syrup emulation engine
- Parent: Atari SA (2026-present)
- Website: www.implicitconversions.com

Implicit Conversions, Inc. is a video game developer specialising in the commercial emulation of classic and retro video games on modern gaming platforms.

== History ==
Implicit Conversions was founded in 2019 by Robin Lavallée and Jake Stine.

In 2021 Implicit Conversions began a partnership with Sony Interactive Entertainment to bring emulation based releases of classic PlayStation and PlayStation Portable games to the PlayStation 4 and PlayStation 5 video game consoles.. An initial 15 games were released between May 2022 and June 2022 on the PlayStation Store under the PlayStation Plus Classics Catalogue branding.

In 2024 Implicit Conversions began development of their own proprietary emulation technology, and in October 2024 released their first self-published game Micro Mages (originally developed by Morphcat Games) utilising the Syrup emulation engine.

In 2025 Implicit Conversions worked with partners including Limited Run Games, Digital Eclipse and Xseed Games to release PlayStation games Fear Effect, Mortal Kombat Trilogy, and Milano's Odd Job Collection

In April 2026 Atari SA announced they had acquired Implicit Conversions for an undisclosed fee, in a deal which includes both the studio and their proprietary emulation technology.

== Syrup emulation engine ==
The Syrup emulation engine is a proprietary emulation platform for releasing classic and retro video games on modern gaming platforms like the PlayStation 5, Nintendo Switch and Microsoft Windows. Similar to other multi-system emulator platforms, it utilises a central emulation engine (Syrup) with modular support for loading emulator plugins for various classic gaming systems.

=== Features ===
It includes front-end functionality which enables the emulated game to support save states, timeline rewind, and controller re-mapping. Additionally, it enables aspects of the game to be modified, such as adding widescreen support, altering game assets and adding additional language localisations. The engine supports the NES and PlayStation.

=== Releases utilising the Syrup emulation engine ===
| Year | Title | Original Platform | Partner(s) | Notes |
|---|---|---|---|---|
| 2024 | Micro Mages | NES | Morphcat Games | |
| 2025 | Fear Effect | PlayStation | Limited Run Games | |
| 2025 | Mortal Kombat: Legacy Kollection | PlayStation | Digital Eclipse | Contributed to the emulation of Mortal Kombat Trilogy, Mortal Kombat Mythologies: Sub-Zero and Mortal Kombat: Special Forces |
| 2025 | Milano's Odd Job Collection | PlayStation | XSEED Games | Translated from Japanese to English in partnership with HilltopWorks |
| 2026 | Fighting Force | PlayStation | Limited Run Games | |
| 2026 | Fighting Force 2 | PlayStation | Limited Run Games | |
| 2026 | Rayman | PlayStation | Digital Eclipse | Released as part of the Rayman: 30th Anniversary Edition |
| 2026 | Fear Effect 2: Retro Helix | PlayStation | Limited Run Games | |
| 2026 | 70's Robot Anime Geppy-X | PlayStation | Bliss Brain | Localised from Japanese to English |
| 2026 | Toy Story: Retro Roundup! | PlayStation | Digital Eclipse | Contributed to the emulation of A Bug's Life, Buzz Lightyear of Star Command, Toy Story 2: Buzz Lightyear to the Rescue, and Toy Story Racer |
| 2027 | Lucky Luke: The Lonesome Cowboy Collection | PlayStation | Graphite Lab | Contributed to the emulation of Lucky Luke and Lucky Luke: Western Fever. |
