= Gunship 2000 (wargame) =

1978 set of rules for wargames

Gunship 2000 is a set of rules published by Stan Johansen Miniatures in 1978 for wargaming using science fiction miniatures.

== Description ==
In 1977, Stan Johansen started to play the new board wargame Ogre with his wargaming friends. However, they were used to wargaming with metal miniatures rather than the game's cardboard counters. Johansen, who had produced miniatures for his company Stan Johansen Miniatures for nearly a decade, agreed to create some 1/300 scale miniatures of the science fiction vehicles. Since the miniatures no longer fit on the hex grid map provided with the game, Johansen also wrote new rules for combat. He also included a point-buy system so that players could create balanced scenarios.

Johansen published those rules in 1978 as Gunship 2000, a single piece of cardstock with the title printed on one side and the rules printed on the other. He also produced a line of miniatures for Gunship 2000 called Star Armour that included VTOL fighter bombers, transports, and missile tanks.

In 1991, Microprose released an identically named DOS computer game, Gunship 2000, but the titling was coincidental, and not related to the Stan Johansen wargame rules.

== Reception ==
Nevin J. Templin reviewed Gunship 2000 in two different issues of The Space Gamer, saying, "Gunship 2000 is a simple, fast playing set of rules covering ground and limited air combat in the year 2000." He noted the connection to Ogre and its sister game G.E.V.: "What makes the game of special interest is that many of the miniatures are adaptable to ''Ogre/GEV, the game giving the feeling of a 3-D version of Ogre, but with a faster pace and more dangerous battlefield than found in Ogre. He concluded, "These rules maintain the flavor of the Ogre/G.E.V. originals and allow for fast action with ease of playability."
