= Infogrames (2024-present) =

American video game publisher dealing with independent titles

Infogrames, LLC
- Type: Subsidiary
- Industry: Video games
- Founded: April 23, 2024; 2 years ago
- Headquarters: Madison Avenue, Manhattan, New York, United States
- Key people: Geoffroy Châteauvieux (Manager)
- Products: Totally Reliable Delivery Service; Surgeon Simulator; Bread & Fred
- Parent: Atari SA
- Website: infogrames.com

Infogrames is an American video game publisher and a subsidiary of Atari SA, which itself was formerly known as Infogrames Entertainment SA. Infogrames publishes and distributes independent titles and acquisitions that fall outside the core portfolio of IP associated with the Atari brand.

== History ==
The Atari SA holding company, alongside its subsidiaries, was formerly known as Infogrames. In May 2003, the subsidiaries were all rebranded under the Atari name with the holding company changing to Atari SA six years later.

On April 23, 2024, Atari SA announced that it would relaunch Infogrames as a standalone publishing label, following its acquisitions of Nightdive Studios and Digital Eclipse the previous year. The new Infogrames would focus on acquiring and purchasing IP that would fall outside Atari's core portfolio, with Atari COO Geoffroy Châteauvieux hired as manager for the division. Infogrames announced that it had acquired the intellectual property and trademarks for Totally Reliable Delivery Service from tinyBuild, which would become its first title. In an interview at Gamescom in 2024, Atari's CEO Wade Rosen said that he hoped to position Infogrames as a "preservationist" publisher for titles that were "under-appreciated" by existing companies that owned them.

On June 26, 2024, Infogrames announced the acquisition of the Surgeon Simulator franchise from tinyBuild. On November 4, 2024, Infogrames added its first publishing acquisition to its portfolio when developer Sand Castles Studio announced that Atari would take over publication rights for Bread & Fred under Infogrames, which was previously published by Apogee Entertainment.

On August 20, 2025, Infogrames entered into an extensive publishing partnership with Apogee Entertainment, beginning with the retail release of Wizordum. A similar partnership was made in August 2026 with MicroProse for the console ports of Carrier Command 2.

== Titles ==
Game	Release/Purchase	Developer	Platform	Note
Totally Reliable Delivery Service	April 23, 2024	We're Five Games	Windows, MacOS, PlayStation 4, Xbox One, Nintendo Switch, iOS, Android	Acquired from tinyBuild. Originally released on April 1, 2020.
Surgeon Simulator	June 26, 2024	Bossa Studios	Windows, macOS, Linux, iOS, PlayStation 4, Android, Nintendo Switch	Acquired from tinyBuild. Originally released on April 19, 2013.
Surgeon Simulator 2: Access All Areas	June 26, 2024	Bossa Studios	Windows, Xbox One, Xbox Series X/S	Acquired from tinyBuild. Originally released on September 2, 2021.
Bread & Fred	November 4, 2024	Sand Castles Studio	Windows, macOS, Nintendo Switch	Publishing rights only, formerly by Apogee Entertainment. Originally released on May 23, 2023.
Wizordum	September 23, 2025	Emberheart Games	PlayStation 4, PlayStation 5, Xbox One, Xbox Series X/S, Nintendo Switch	Co-published with Atari (Physical releases) and Apogee Entertainment. Console releases only; originally released on April 29, 2025, on Windows.
Grow Home	October 2025	Ubisoft Reflections	Windows, PlayStation 4, Linux	Acquired from Ubisoft. Originally released on February 4, 2015 for Windows.
Grow Up	October 2025	Ubisoft Reflections	Windows, PlayStation 4, Xbox One	Acquired from Ubisoft. Originally released on August 16, 2016.
Totally Reliable Delivery Service	October 22, 2025	We're Five Games	PlayStation 5, Xbox Series X/S	
Total Chaos	March 2, 2026	Clear River Games	PlayStation 5	Physical release, published by Apogee Entertainment.
Total Chaos	April 30, 2026	Clear River Games	Nintendo Switch 2	Physical release, published by Apogee Entertainment.
Cultic: Complete Edition	June 23, 2026	Jasozz Games	PlayStation 5, Xbox Series X/S, Nintendo Switch 2	Co-published with Atari, licensed from 3D Realms. Publishing rights only.
Parkasaurus: Dinoluxe Edition	August 5, 2026	Washbear Studio	PlayStation 5, Xbox Series X/S, Nintendo Switch 2	Publishing rights only.
Lucky Luke: The Lonesome Cowboy Collection	January 13, 2027	Graphite Lab	PlayStation 4, PlayStation 5, Xbox One, Xbox Series X/S, Nintendo Switch, Nintendo Switch 2, Windows	
Carrier Command 2	TBA	Geometa	PlayStation 5, Xbox Series X/S, Nintendo Switch, Nintendo Switch 2	Console publishing rights only, licensed from MicroProse. Originally released on August 10, 2021, for Windows.
