= Parkasaurus =

- Developer: Washbear Studio
- Publishers: Washbear Studio; Infogrames (Switch 2, PS5, XBX/S)
- Engine: Unity
- Platforms: Microsoft Windows; Nintendo Switch; Dinoluxe Edition; Nintendo Switch 2; PlayStation 5; Xbox Series X/S
- Release: Windows; August 13, 2020; Switch; April 28, 2022; Dinoluxe Edition; Switch 2, PS5, XBX/S; August 5, 2026
- Genres: Construction and management simulation, Business simulation
- Mode: Single-player

Parkasaurus is a construction and management simulation video game developed and published by Washbear Studio. The player is tasked with creating a zoo for dinosaurs by designing and building exhibits. It entered Steam Early Access on September 25, 2018, and officially released on August 13, 2020. The game was also released on the Nintendo Switch on April 28, 2022. A port for Nintendo Switch 2, PlayStation 5 and Xbox Series X/S, titled Parkasaurus: Dinoluxe Edition, was released on August 5, 2026 by Infogrames.

== Gameplay ==
The standard game mode revolves around hiring employees, hatching dinosaur eggs, and catching dinosaurs if they escape. The player can use various components such as fences and plants to create exhibits for dinosaurs. All zoo buildings can be chosen from a build menu and placed within the zoo to generate income with its perks. Guests who stay longer at the location will also pay more. Among the employees, scientists can search around to find fossils, create new dinosaur eggs, and janitors clean up by taking the trash out. Single player mode is supported. Each dinosaur has certain diet and habitat needs, as well as privacy requirements. There are some basic biomes can be created immediately, but for others, some terrain needs be tweaked (water supplies, making it more rugged, adding trees). The game has two skill trees that will unlock new buildings, dinosaurs, and items.

== Release ==
In July 2026, Washbear entered into a partnership with Atari division Infogrames to release the game on the PlayStation 5, Xbox Series X/S and Nintendo Switch 2. The game was released for the respective platforms on August 5, 2026, and includes the base game and both DLC packs.

== Reception ==
Reception

Aggregate score
Aggregator	Score
Metacritic	PC: 70/100; NS: 82/100

Review scores
Publication	Score
GameStar	75/100
Nintendo World Report	8.5/10
PC Games (DE)	7/10

Parkasaurus received "mixed or average" reviews for Windows according to review aggregator Metacritic; the Nintendo Switch version received "generally favorable" reviews.

=== Awards ===
Parkasaurus has won some awards during the development including Ubisoft Indie Series National Bank Special Prize Winner 2019, Pax Online 2020 Indie Showcase Selection and The MIX Pax West Showcase Selection 2019.
