= Cultic (video game) =

2022 video game

- Developer: Jasozz Games
- Publishers: 3D Realms; Atari/Infogrames (Complete Edition)
- Engine: Unity
- Platforms: Windows; PlayStation 5 Xbox Series X/S; Nintendo Switch 2
- Release: Chapter One: October 13, 2022; Chapter Two: September 18, 2025
- Genres: Retro first-person shooter, action-adventure, horror
- Mode: Single-player

Cultic (stylized as CULTIC) is a first-person shooter game created by Jasozz Games and published by 3D Realms for Windows. It was released in two chapters: Chapter One was released on October 13, 2022; Chapter Two was released on September 18, 2025. A Complete Edition was published by Atari and Infogrames for the PlayStation 5 and Xbox Series X/S on June 23, 2026. A Switch 2 release is planned, with no announced release date.

Set in the 1960s, players control a disgraced detective who uncovers a violent, brainwashed cult involved in a murder spree. After being left for dead in a mass grave, he must stand up and fight his way through the ranks of the twisted cult.

It has received positive reviews for its combat, level design, and soundtrack. It is inspired by games like Blood, Duke Nukem 3D, and Quake.

== Gameplay ==
Cultic features a variety of weapons, such as a pistol, a lever-action rifle, and a flamethrower. Chapter Two adds a revolver, a semi-automatic shotgun, and "temporary weapons" (such as a mounted machine gun) which prevent using other items or quick-switching weapons while in use. None of the weapons use hitscans.

The player is also equipped with bundles of dynamite and molotov cocktails. Similar to Blood, dynamite may be lit and thrown, or thrown unlit and then later shot at to detonate it, both dealing heavy damage in a wide area. Bundles may also be unwrapped and the individual sticks thrown to an even wider area. Lethal headshots occasionally trigger a short slow-motion effect called Gib Time.

Nearly all weapons can be upgraded at workbenches, with each upgrade costing an amount of Weapon Parts. For example, upgrades may improve a gun's capacity, damage, or sights. Weapon Parts can be found during normal gameplay and in secret areas.

Health can also be restored using a portable field kit. Excess healing is stored for later use. The player's health can be permanently increased by obtaining Imbued Remains, which are mostly found in secret areas.

The player can collect two different types of armor: ballistic armor and blast armor. The first protects against bullets, while the second protects against explosions and fire. Tower shields can be wielded in the off-hand or planted into the ground for use as mobile cover.

Enemies include various armed cultists, corrupted police officers, mutated monsters, and bosses. Enemies with a red mist over their heads are "imbued", making them stronger and more dangerous.

== Plot ==
In the small town of New Grandewel, a series of mysterious disappearances points a detective to the town's lunatic asylum. Upon driving to it late at night, he is attacked and subdued by a group of hooded cultists, who then dump his body in a mass grave, assuming he is dead. The Detective (also named the Outsider by the cult) however survives the attack, driving him to fight and destroy the cult.

The story is told primarily through its environment and notes.

=== Chapter One ===
The player assumes the role of the Detective, who after being left for dead in a mass grave, advances through a ship yard and mining town, gradually learning about the cult and its activities in the town. The player learns that the cult's goal is to summon and harness a mysterious force named "the Will". The cult had been experimenting with using corpses and other dead matter to empower themselves, thus requiring large-scale slaughter. However, this also has the side effect of failures creating even more hostile and mutated monsters, who were controlled only by the Will. The cult also seeks to open a "gate", which acts as a portal to the Will and allows it to invade Earth.

He arrives at a zombie-infested crypt, then proceeds to a chapel, where a T26E4 tank appears as a mini-boss. After, the player goes to a defunct asylum, which has since been bought and reused by the cult for their own purposes. Descending down an excavation site which leads to a ritual chamber, the player finds the boss of the chapter, the Abomination, a grotesque result of many failed imbuement experiments with the Will, embedded in the wall of the chamber.

A brief interlude level connects the two chapters, ending with a boss fight with the Armor Amalgamation, which is the previous chapter's T26E4 tank now morphed with a monster.

=== Chapter Two ===
The player awakes in a morgue at a police station in New Grandewel, initially carrying only a lighter. They soon find a revolver from a dead police officer, the first new weapon in the chapter. They travel through the city, including through a shopping mall, a renaissance fair, a swamp, and an Old West-inspired arena.

The Detective boards a train bound for a manor, one of the cult's bases of operation. After fighting through the train's cars, the train is stopped and ambushed by a small army of cultists. In a change of characters, the player now controls an unnamed ally, who is also carrying a bolt-action sniper rifle. After defeating the cultists and resetting the tracks, the train continues, and the player resumes as the Detective. Soon after, a Martyr blows up the train and derails it, knocking the Detective unconscious.

The player awakes in the basement of a manor. After finding three skulls, they unlock a passage to a bunker, before eventually arriving at The Gate. The Detective finds the cult's leader standing in front of a pool of blood, with a pulsating heart floating above it. The leader turns and begins saying that "he is too late", but the Detective shoots him before he can speak further, apparently killing him. He falls back into the pool before the heart reforms into the High Archon, the game's final boss.

After defeating the boss, in a last plea, the Archon reveals that the Detective has been killed and resurrected multiple times before, and that his body is "imbued with the same power" and thus kept alive by the Will. Therefore, if the Detective kills him and destroys the heart, he will also die. The Detective kills the Archon anyway, and the gate closes, reversing the Will's effect and eliminating the cult. In his final moments, the Detective sits and watches the sunrise.

== Development ==
Developer Jasozz Games is based in Kansas. Cultic was designed to emulate graphics of older games, in particular Blood, Quake, and Duke Nukem 3D. It uses a color palette, dithering, and a mix of sprites and voxels. Levels are named in a similar style to Doom (i.e. C1L5 for chapter 1, level 5). Although developed in Unity, it was designed to resemble games built with the Build engine.

Jason Smith, the sole member of Jasozz Games, was also the game's composer.

During development of Chapter Two, Smith hired a co-level designer, Nick Palsmeier. Chapter Two was released as paid DLC on September 18, 2025.

== Reception ==
Reception

Aggregate scores
Aggregator	Score
Metacritic	83/100
OpenCritic	84% recommend

Review scores
Publication	Score
Destructoid	7/10
IGN	7.9/10
PC Gamer (UK)	81/100 (PC)
PSX Brasil	8.5/10

Cultic received "generally favorable reviews" according to review aggregator website Metacritic, scoring a 83/100 on the site. It also scored a "84% Critics Recommend" on OpenCritic. Many reviewers praised its gunplay, visual style, and similarity to Blood.

The game's combat and gunplay were particularly well-received. Zoey Handley of Destructoid praised the game's combat and well-roundedness, while critiquing the color palette and visual style. She summarized her review with "the music, level design, mechanics, and aesthetics are all very even. Nothing feels out of line or disparate. While this makes things somewhat flat and predictable, it's hard to be disappointed when a game's so solid." PC Gamer's Dominic Tarason also praised the game's combat and commented that "like Blood, it's twitchy and aggressive, with machine gun- and shotgun-wielding cultists able to tear you to shreds on sight."

Liam Richardson, writing for Rock Paper Shotgun, praised the game's movement and appearance, saying "I found myself reaching for the screenshot button on a regular basis, pausing between firefights to admire sights such as these."

Hey Poor Player noted the game's horror aspect and eerie atmosphere in some levels, with Jonathan Trussler calling its soundtrack "stellar", and that "it switches up from an unsettling background unease to an intense battle in a really dynamic way."
