= Surgeon Simulator =

2013 video game

- Developer: Bossa Studios
- Publisher: Infogrames (Note: Originally self-published by Bossa Studios from 2013-2022, and by tinyBuild from 2022-2024.)
- Series: Surgeon Simulator
- Engine: Unity
- Platforms: Microsoft Windows, OS X, Linux, iOS, PlayStation 4, Android, Nintendo Switch
- Release: 19 April 2013: Microsoft Windows, OS X, Linux; WW: 19 April 2013; iOS; WW: 7 March 2014; PlayStation 4; NA: 12 August 2014; EU: 13 August 2014; Android; WW: 14 August 2014; Nintendo Switch; WW: 13 September 2018
- Genre: Simulation
- Mode: Single-player

Surgeon Simulator (formerly Surgeon Simulator 2013) is a surgical simulation video game developed by Bossa Studios. The initial version was created by Tom Jackson, Jack Good, Luke Williams and James Broadley in a 48-hour period for the 2013 Global Game Jam; the developers continued and spent 48 days creating a commercial version. The full version was released via Steam in April 2013, and GOG.com on 10 October 2013 followed by an iPad release on 7 March 2014.

On 26 August 2022, Bossa Studios sold the franchise to tinyBuild for $3 million. On 26 June 2024, Atari SA acquired the franchise from TinyBuild for an undisclosed amount and transitioned it to their Infogrames label. A sequel, Surgeon Simulator 2, was released in August 2020.

== Gameplay ==
Surgeon Simulator is played in first-person perspective. Mouse movement is used to control the movement of the player's hand. By holding down the right mouse button and moving the mouse, the player can rotate the hand. The left mouse button is used to lower the hand. By default, the A, W, E, R, and Space keys are used to control individual corresponding digits for grasping items. Gameplay of the player attempting to perform various surgical procedures, for example a heart transplant. Multiple extra modes are available after completion of the early operations, such as performing an operation while inside an ambulance where surgical instruments bounce around at random, and operating in space where the zero-g environment causes all of the instruments to free-float.

Three free downloadable content (DLC) features and one paid DLC were added after release. The first was released on 21 June 2013, and features an operation in which the player performs surgery on Team Fortress 2's character Heavy, based on the "Meet the Medic" Team Fortress 2 promotional video. The second was released on 9 September 2013, named "Code Name Trisha", and features an operation in which surgery is performed on an alien. The third was released on 2 June 2016, named "Inside Donald Trump", in which a heart transplant is performed on then presidential candidate Donald Trump. On 14 August 2014, an Anniversary A&E Edition was released on Steam. It added the eye and teeth transplants from the iOS version along with some other features, such as operating while running through the hospital corridors.

== Plot ==
The game's protagonist is a surgeon named Nigel Burke, who has a placement at a fictional hospital somewhere in the fictitious United Kingdom town of Barnardshire in 1987. He carries out various operations, at first on a patient affectionately named 'Bob' by the game developers, and later operates on Bob inside a space station orbiting Earth. Afterwards, he is contacted by an alien race by VHS tape, and operates on one of the aliens, gaining the title of 'Best Surgeon in the Universe'. Free DLC "Inside Donald Trump" will takes place in present day during a presidential election in 2016 and begins to operates a heart transplant for Trump to maintain his health, Nigel will either choose the two type of heart organ, such as the gold or the stone heart.

== Development ==
An initial version of Surgeon Simulator 2013 was created for the Global Game Jam in which the team had 48 hours to make the game. The team took inspiration from the game Jurassic Park: Trespasser for the control scheme, which also came about because teams in the jam would gain bonus points if a game used ten buttons on the keyboard. The team initially wanted to assign a finger to each button but soon realized this was impractical and instead only limited this style of control to one hand with the other being controlled by the mouse.

The developers were initially unsure of whether or not the game was "genuinely" funny, although they found themselves laughing they were not sure if it was the game or their sleep deprivation causing it. It was only when they finally presented the prototype to the audience that they realized the comic potential.

== Release ==
In January 2014, Bossa released footage of an iPad release of the game to be released sometime that year. On 7 March, Surgeon Simulator (at the time called Surgeon Simulator 2013) was released and featured the classic heart and kidney transplants and two new transplants: eye and teeth. The app includes the new corridor feature in which the player has to save Bob while carts with at least seven items pass by and have to not kill him.

There is a new feature taking advantage of heart rate, which makes it more challenging for players. When it reaches 0, the player has to charge the defibrillators to save Bob. A PlayStation 4 version of the game was announced on 10 June 2014 and released on 12 August 2014, featuring all of the games surgeries in every location. The PS4 version was released and named Surgeon Simulator: A&E Anniversary Edition.

A Nintendo Switch version was announced in July 2018 and released on 13 September 2018, with it being branded as Surgeon Simulator CPR standing for "Cooperative Play Ready". The game included a special local cooperative mode, allowing two players using separate Joy-Con to control Nigel's arms.

== Reception ==
Reception

Aggregate score
Aggregator	Score
Metacritic	PC: 71/100 iOS: 67/100; PS4: 56/100; NS: 59/100

Review score
Publication	Score
TouchArcade	3.5/5

Reception for the game has been mixed, with critics stating that although the game was hard to control, this difficulty was "part of the appeal." Ars Technica commented upon the narrator's voice-over, saying that it "belies the ridiculousness that unfolds as he flops and flails his way through surgery". Rock, Paper, Shotgun praised the game's humour and fun, and said "Surgeon Simulator 2013 is not a brilliant game. But it is a brilliant joke. In the form of a game. It's an idea that is a clean magnitude of awesome above 90% of what will be released this year because it is so absurd." Eurogamer rated the game 7/10 and also praised its humour. Surgeon Simulator 2013 has sold 2 million copies as of 4 February 2015.

== Sequel ==
The game's sequel, Surgeon Simulator 2, was released on August 27, 2020, and received similarly mixed reception. Compared to the first game, it adds a controllable player character for a full first-person viewpoint, as well as 4-player co-op and a "creation mode" that allows for player-designed levels.
