= Totally Reliable Delivery Service =

2020 video game

- Developer: We're Five Games
- Publisher: Infogrames (Note: Originally published by tinyBuild from 2020-2024.)
- Engine: Unity
- Platforms: Android; iOS; macOS; Nintendo Switch; PlayStation 4; PlayStation 5; Windows; Xbox One; Xbox Series X/S
- Release: April 1, 2020; PlayStation 5, Xbox Series X/S; October 22, 2025
- Genre: Party
- Mode: Multiplayer

Totally Reliable Delivery Service is a multiplayer party video game developed by We're Five Games. The game involves using teamwork to deliver packages safely. The game became available on Nintendo Switch, Windows, macOS, PlayStation 4, Xbox One, iOS and Android in April 2020. Ports to the PlayStation 5 and the Xbox Series X/S were released in October 2025.

== Gameplay ==
Totally Reliable Delivery Service gameplay consists of 1–4 players working together using various methods to deliver packages from a starting location to highlighted areas on the map. These methods include hand delivery, vehicles, trampolines, and rocket ships. The difficulty of the game comes from battling the chaotic nature of ragdoll physics and the limitations of only being able to hold one object in each hand. Teamwork is encouraged as players are rewarded for successful package deliveries. Players need to deliver the packages carefully, as significant damage can cause the package to explode. Players cannot die in the game unless they fall into water.

== Development and Release ==
Publisher tinyBuild announced they had acquired We're Five Games in February 2021, and revealed that the game had reached 14 million downloads across all platforms.

On April 23, 2024, Atari SA announced they had acquired the publishing rights to the title from tinyBuild, and that it would become the first title to be released under their newly relaunched Infogrames label.

On May 14, 2025, Infogrames and We're Five Games announced that the game would undergo a major update, ports to PlayStation 5 and Xbox Series X/S, and a "definitive edition" physical release for the PlayStation 5 and Nintendo Switch. The update will increase the player amount in the game from four to five, while online modes will allow for cross-platform play and the addition of online leaderboards. Two new DLC packs, one being based on Atari properties and another based on mascots, will also be released. Infogrames' owners, Atari, will publish the physical release, which will include all existing DLC content in the game. The content, alongside the next-gen versions, was released on October 22, 2025. The physical version will be released in February 2026.

== Reception ==
Reception

Aggregate score
Aggregator	Score
Metacritic	PC: 64/100; PS4: 55/100; XONE: 63/100; NS: 42/100

Totally Reliable Delivery Service received "mixed or average" reviews according to Metacritic.

IGN compared the game to Goat Simulator and Human: Fall Flat, and wrote that it was "shambolic by design in order to derive maximum humour from the resulting unpredictability". He, however, remarked that the game was "is just as likely to trigger fits of laughter as it is to spark fits of anger". Nintendo Life strongly criticized the game's controls and visuals, adding that they "can't imagine anyone genuinely enjoying it", and disliked the game's implementation of downloadable content.
