= Starshot: Space Circus Fever =

1998 video game

- North American Nintendo 64 cover art
- Developer: Infogrames
- Publisher: Infogrames
- Director: Xavier Schon
- Producer: Xavier Schon
- Designer: Xavier Schon
- Platforms: Nintendo 64, Windows
- Release: Nintendo 64: EU: December 4, 1998; NA: June 29, 1999; Windows: NA: June 2, 1999; EU: 2000
- Genre: Platformer
- Mode: Single-player

Starshot: Space Circus Fever (French: Starshot: Panique au Space Circus) is a platform game for Nintendo 64 and Windows. It is one of the few games on the Nintendo 64 to feature 16:9 widescreen. The Nintendo 64 version had been scheduled to be released in North America on April 16, 1999, before it was delayed to June 29.

== Plot ==
Starshot is a juggler for the struggling Space Circus, led by Starcash. After driving rivaling company Virtua Circus off a planet, the Space Circus is informed they have to repay the Intergalactic Bank within ten days or they will be annihilated.

Desperate, Starshot is sent to a planet that serves as a weapons expo to retrieve a device that can detect new attractions. After getting his hands on the device, it sends him to four planets, where he retrieves the ghost dog Laika, the last Earthling, and a flawed machine. On the fourth planet, he tries to acquire a mysterious bird, however, it is killed by Virtua Circus.

The circus pays back the loan to the bank representative using the money made with the new acts, only to discover that the representative was in fact a Virtua Circus robot in disguise. Virtua Circus now tries to destroy the Space Circus Ship. Starshot is sent to deal with the threat and he battles with the Virtua Circus director, Wolfgang. After Starshot defeats him, he begs for mercy from Starcash. Starcash decides not to kill him and leaves instead. However, Starshot is captured by Wolfgang and is last seen in a cell on the Virtua Circus ship as it floats into space aimlessly.

== Reception ==
Reception

Aggregate score
Aggregator	Score	
Aggregator	N64	PC
GameRankings	54%	65%

Review scores
Publication	Score	
Publication	N64	PC
AllGame	1.5/5	N/A
CNET Gamecenter	N/A	6/10
Computer Games Strategy Plus	N/A	3/5
Consoles +	83%	N/A
Electronic Gaming Monthly	3/10	N/A
Game Informer	4.5/10	N/A
GameSpot	5.6/10	N/A
Hyper	50%	N/A
IGN	5.2/10	6.5/10
Nintendo Power	6.5/10	N/A
N64 Gamer	7/10	N/A

The game received mixed reviews on both platforms according to the review aggregation website GameRankings.
