= 70's Robot Anime Geppy-X =

1999 video game

70's Robot Anime: Geppy-X
- Developer: Aroma
- Publisher: Aroma
- Director: Akihide Kohara
- Producer: Yoshio Okui
- Programmer: Keizo Mochizuki
- Artists: Masayoshi Obata; Yorihisa Uchida
- Writer: Akihide Kohara
- Composer: Momo Michishita
- Platform: PlayStation
- Release: JP: May 27, 1999
- Genre: Horizontal-scrolling shooter
- Mode: Single-player

70's Robot Anime Geppy-X (70年代風ロボットアニメ ゲッP-X, 70-Nendai-fū Robotto Anime Geppī Ekkusu) is a horizontally scrolling shooter video game developed and published by Aroma for the PlayStation console. It was released in Japan on May 27, 1999. A remastered version released on July 16, 2026, marking the first time the game was released outside of Japan.

== Gameplay ==
Gameplay screenshot

70's Robot Anime Geppy-X is a 2D side scrolling shooting game. Stages in the game are presented as if they were episodes of a fictitious episodic anime series named Geppy-X. Following the anime episode format, stages play the format of opening theme, Part A, Eye Catch, Part B, ending theme, and ending on a next episode preview. The stages even include fake commercials and its own theme music. For example, one such commercial in the game promotes a fictitious series which is a parody of Ashita no Joe, and another for merchandise related to the show such as shampoo.

The game is set in the year 197X. In the game, the protagonists use the Geppy-X giant robot to fight the invading forces of the Space Devil Empire.

The titular robot, Geppy-X, can transform into three different robot forms, each modeled after famous 70s robots. The game only has nine actual stages despite taking up four compact discs.

== Development and release ==
The game was developed by Japanese game developer Aroma, and is an affectionate parody of mecha anime series from the 1970s, such as those created by Go Nagai and Ken Ishikawa, such as Grendizer, Mazinger-Z, and particularly Getter Robo. The game's soundtrack features Japanese singers Isao Sasaki, Crystal King's Monsieur Yoshisaki, Akira Kushida, MIQ and Hironobu Kageyama who sing the insert songs in the game, while the former sings the opening and ending theme songs. The game takes up a total of four compact discs, and makes heavy use of full motion video, and game music. For comparison, the game Final Fantasy VIII also used that many discs. In total, there are 8000 video clips used in the game.

The game was released on May 27, 1999, for the Sony PlayStation and was published by the Aroma Corporation. The game was never released outside of Japan, and it has never been re-released on the PlayStation Network's Game Archives.

A remaster, 70s-style Robot Anime Geppy-X, was announced on February 26, 2026. Developed by Implicit Conversions and published by Bliss Brain, the remaster is scheduled to be released on July 16, 2026, and will be the first release of the game outside of Japan.

== Reception ==
Upon release, four reviewers for Famitsu gave the game a total score of 26/40. Reviewers appreciated the thoroughness of the dedication to recreating a 1970s mecha anime in game form, including even commercials and songs. They said that anyone familiar with those series would find it rather nostalgic. Spanish gaming magazine Superjuegos said the game would be a rather unremarkable shooting game with graphics that looked like it came from the Super Famicom, if it weren't for the replication of a 70s anime series. The presentation was so thorough, that the author spent weeks searching on the internet to see if there was a real Geppy-X anime series. Despite that however, the writer said that there were other better shooting games for the PlayStation.
