= Micro Mages =

2019 video game

- Promotional box-art and manual preview
- Developer: Morphcat Games
- Publisher: Morphcat Games
- Designers: Julius Riecke; Nicolas Bétoux
- Programmer: Julius Riecke
- Artist: Nicolas Bétoux
- Composer: Julius Riecke
- Platform: Nintendo Entertainment System
- Release: April 30, 2019
- Genre: Platform
- Modes: Single-player, multiplayer

Micro Mages is a platform game for the Nintendo Entertainment System that was published on April 30, 2019 by Morphcat Games. The game raised over €150,000 on Kickstarter. The game was published as a physical cartridge for the NES, and later as a digital download, bundled with an emulator, on Steam and Itch.io.

== Development ==
The game was developed to fit within 40 kilobytes, the size that all games published when the NES was released, such as Super Mario Bros., had to fit into (later development techniques allowed larger games, such as Super Mario Bros. 3). The game was written in 6502 assembly language. 8 kilobytes of cartridge space was reserved for graphics, while the remaining 32 kilobytes were used for game code. Graphics were reused across levels and animations to save space. Player characters were deliberately scaled down in order to avoid sprite overflow. The game was written with the goal of creating an expansive multi-player game with the same limitations that the first NES developers experienced.
