= Gunship (video game) =

1986 video game

- X68000 cover art
- Developers: MicroProse; Probe Software (Mega Drive)
- Publishers: MicroProse; U.S. Gold (Mega Drive)
- Director: Andy Hollis
- Designers: Arnold Hendrick; Andy Hollis
- Programmers: Andy Hollis; Sid Meier; Gregg Tavares
- Artists: Kimberly Disney; Michael O. Haire; Michele Mahan
- Composer: Ken Lagace
- Platforms: Amiga, Amstrad CPC, Atari ST, Commodore 64, FM Towns, MS-DOS, MSX, PC-98, X68000, ZX Spectrum, Mega Drive
- Release: 1986
- Genre: Combat flight simulation
- Mode: Single-player

Gunship is a combat flight simulation video game developed and published by MicroProse in 1986. In the game, controlling a simulated AH-64 Apache helicopter, players navigate through missions to attack enemy targets and protect friendly forces. Commercially and critically successful, Gunship was followed by Gunship 2000 and Gunship!.

== Gameplay ==
Preparing to take off.

The game features missions in five regions, including the U.S. (training), Southeast Asia (1st Air Cavalry Division), Central America (82nd Airborne Division), Middle East (101st Airborne Division) and Western Europe (3rd Armored Division). After selection of region, style, and enemies, the pilot is assigned a primary mission and a secondary mission. These could include such objectives as "Destroy enemy headquarters" or "Support friendly troops" (i.e. destroy targets near friendly forces). The latter would be an easier mission, because the battle would be fought closer to friendly lines.

The pilot then arms the Apache helicopter gunship, usually selecting AGM-114 Hellfire air-to-ground missiles (guided missiles that destroy "hard" targets such as bunkers and tanks), FFARs (Folding Fin Aerial Rockets; unguided rockets that destroy "soft" targets such as infantry and installations), and HEDP (High-Explosive, Dual-Purpose) rounds for the 30 mm cannon (an all-purpose weapon with a maximum range of 1.5 km); in Central America, the Middle East, and Western Europe, AIM-9 Sidewinders would also be standard equipment, usually as a backup air-to-air weapon in case of cannon failure.

Patient players might move in short jumps, crouching behind hills to block the enemy's line of sight and suddenly popping up to attack. More aggressive players generally fly fast and erratically to evade enemy fire, flying in low to deliver devastating cannon attacks at close range. Since flight time is a component of the mission evaluation, either method has its advantages. The latter, however, can be rather dangerous against 1st Line enemies whose fast reaction times can cause the chopper to be pummelled with relentless fire.

Most enemy fire, especially small caliber, is deflected by armor, but some will cause systems damage. After enough damaging hits, the structural integrity will fail, causing a general power failure that requires the pilot to use autorotation to land safely. An emergency landing by a seriously injured pilot in enemy territory causes him to become Missing in Action. If the pilot lands without serious injury, he can escape back to base and live to fight another day.

There is no defined time limit in the game. A player can return to any number of Forward Area Resupply Points to be rearmed, refueled and damage repaired. Returning to the Home Base will end the mission. Ideally, the pilot completes both missions, knocks out other targets, and makes it back to base within 20 minutes.

There is no ending to Gunship. Promotions stop once a pilot makes Colonel, although he can continue amassing medals, such as the Purple Heart, Air Medal, Bronze Star, Silver Star, Distinguished Service Cross, and the Medal of Honor and retire with a final promotion to Brig. General. No medals in this game are prerequisites for earning others (the requirement of shooting down two Hinds in one mission for the Medal of Honor led some to believe that it was not possible to earn it before earning lower medals). Repeated medals are harder to earn than the first one. The criteria for winning medals is based on types of targets destroyed, number of targets destroyed, objectives met, time elapsed, and sometimes whether or not the pilot is wounded. As in real life, medals in this game can be awarded posthumously.

== Development and release ==
MicroProse intended Gunship to simulate an urban helicopter akin to Blue Thunder, but found that city graphics were too difficult. It instead used tools developed for F-15 Strike Eagle to create another military simulation. The game was released in 1986 for the MS-DOS, Atari ST, Amiga, Commodore 64, FM Towns, MSX, PC-98, X68000, and ZX Spectrum.

Gunship was also ported to the Sega Mega Drive by U.S. Gold only in Europe in 1993. However, this version of the game differed from the others by featuring more arcade-style gameplay and horizontal shoot 'em up stages.

== Reception ==
Reception

Award
Publication	Award
Crash	Smash

Gunship was MicroProse's third best-selling Commodore game as of late 1987. By 1989, Gunship's sales had surpassed 500,000 units.

Info magazine gave Gunship for the Commodore 64 five stars out of five, describing it as "without qualification, the best combat flight simulator ever released for an 8-bit computer!" Praising its graphics, weapons, sound, controls, physics, and documentation, the magazine concluded that it was "PRIME!" Computer Gaming World stated "this reviewer heartily recommends Gunship ... A five-star rating (my highest) is well-deserved." In a 1994 survey of wargames the magazine gave the title three stars out of five, stating that "When initially released, this was THE helicopter simulation".

Gunship received the Origins Award for "Best Screen Graphics in a Home Computer Game of 1986". It won the award for best simulation game of the year according to the readers of Crash. In 1987, Computer Gaming World named Gunship as its action game of the year, in 1988 the game joined the magazine's Hall of Fame for games highly rated over time by readers, and in 1996, the magazine ranked it as the 102nd best game of all time.

== Legacy ==
A follow-up game, Gunship 2000, was released by MicroProse for several platforms between 1991 and 1996. Its successor, Gunship!, followed in 2000 for Microsoft Windows only.
