= Gunship! =

2000 video game

- Developer: MicroProse Hunt Valley Studio
- Publisher: Hasbro Interactive (Note: Released under the MicroProse label)
- Platform: Windows
- Release: NA: April 4, 2000; EU: 2000
- Genre: Combat flight simulation
- Modes: Single-player, multiplayer

Gunship! is a video game developed by the Hunt Valley studio at MicroProse and published by Hasbro Interactive for Windows in 2000. It's the third game in the Gunship series following Gunship (1986) and Gunship 2000 (1991). Hasbro announced in late 1999 that it would discontinue the development of military simulations. Gunship! was the last game in that genre from MicroProse.

== Gameplay ==
Gunship! is a game in which the player can pilot three helicopters: Boeing AH-64 Apache (also the British variant AgustaWestland Apache), Eurocopter Tiger, and Mil Mi-28. There are two multiplayer options, head-to-head and cooperative.

== Reception ==
Reception

Aggregate score
Aggregator	Score
GameRankings	67%

Review scores
Publication	Score
CNET Gamecenter	5/10
Computer Games Strategy Plus	2.5/5
Computer Gaming World	2.5/5
EP Daily	4/10
GameSpot	5.7/10
GameSpy	90%
IGN	8/10
PC Gamer (US)	44%
PC PowerPlay	89%
PC Zone	49%

The game received average reviews. CNET Gamecenter's Andy Mahood stated, "Although it has its graphical high points and can actually be quite entertaining at times, Gunship never really succeeds. We can only hope--if there is any justice--that if an update of Choplifter is ever released, it will play more like a sim." Computer Games Strategy Plus' Brett Berger said, "while Gunship! is a splended graphical achievement, it isn't as fun to play as its ancestors: Gunship and Gunship 2000. A patch or add-on could do a lot to remedy some of the problems but with Microprose's support record as of late, that's wishful thinking at best." Computer Gaming World's Jeff Lackey said: "It's a shame that Gunship! is plagued with broken commands and bad design choices, because underneath it all beats the heart of a potentially-fun arcade chopper sim. The battlefield action is fast and furious, with a war going on around you as artillery support is called in, ground units clash, armor pops smoke to hide, and so on. And the terrain is really beautiful. But unless the game is patched to fix some of its more grievous issues, it's impossible to recommend Gunship! to anyone." Shaun Conlin of The Electric Playground said of the game, "Potentially: A real fine helicopter game. Actually: A frickin' nightmare." GameSpot's Bruce Geryk said: "Despite its intermittent bugs, Gunship! isn't a bad game if you just want to fly (to use the term loosely) around and cause explosions." GameSpy's Doug Farmer summarized: "With Gunship! Microprose has once once again pushed the envelope on combat attack helicopter simulators. By combining realistic fun with hard core real time strategy they've created an experience that's bound to appeal to nearly every flight sim fan out there." IGN's Rich Rouse said: "Gunship! is pretty much everything we hoped it would be. There's enough action in this box to make it more than worth the buy for any sim enthusiast who's been looking for the right copter to fly." However, PC Gamer's Stephen Poole called it "a buggy, spiritless game that earns the distinction of disappointing both hardcore simmers and casual gamers." PC PowerPlay's Des McNicholas stated, "Microprose has stressed the fact that the aim has been to simulate the entire battlefield experience, rather than just the view from the pilot's seat. It's been an admirable success, and there's no doubt that Gunship! offers the best cooperative (pilot/gunner) gaming I've seen so far." PC Zone's Paul Presley called it "A terrible end to the [Gunship] series."

The game was nominated for the "Most Disappointing Game of the Year" award at GameSpot's Best and Worst of 2000 Awards, which went to Star Wars: Force Commander.
