= Gunship 2000 =

1991 video game

- Developer: MicroProse
- Publisher: MicroProse
- Designers: James M. Day; Darrell Dennies; Detmar Peterke
- Programmers: Darrell Dennies; Detmar Peterke
- Artists: Michael Reis; Max D. Remington III; Michael Gibson
- Composers: Jeffery L. Briggs; Ken Lagace; Jim McConkey
- Platforms: MS-DOS, Amiga, PC-98, Amiga CD32, PlayStation
- Release: 1991: MS-DOS; 1993: Amiga, PC-98; 1994: CD32; 1996: PlayStation
- Genre: Air combat simulation
- Mode: Single-player

Gunship 2000 is a helicopter combat flight simulation video game developed and published by MicroProse as a follow-up to their earlier game Gunship. It was originally released in 1991 for MS-DOS; this version received an expansion in 1992. The Amiga, PC-98, Amiga CD32 and PlayStation versions were released in 1993, 1994 and 1996 respectively (the PlayStation version was retitled as simply Gunship, but was sometimes still referred to as Gunship 2000). A sequel, Gunship!, was released in 2000.

Gunship 2000 significantly enhanced and expanded the features and gameplay from the original Gunship. Besides improved audio and graphics, key areas of change were enhanced terrain, the ability to fly multiple helicopter types, and the ability to command a team of helicopters and their crews.

== Gameplay ==
AH-64 Apache ready for take off from a helicopter base in the Middle East theater (DOS)

Gunship 2000 utilised roughly the same format as most of the other MicroProse flight simulators of the time: the player had a profile, chose their combat theatre, and either performed single missions or a campaign. The primary similarity was the randomly generated 'primary-secondary' mission types where the player was given a primary mission (destroy a target / pickup or drop off troops or cargo / recon an objective) and a less valuable secondary objective that included the same kind of tasks as a primary. The campaign strung these missions together in a 'tug-of-war' system. Victories advanced the player's side towards victory and harder missions, defeat went the other way (though the missions sometimes got harder too).

Initially the player flies a lone helicopter to complete missions, choosing between AH-1 Cobra, AH-64 Apache, OH-58D Kiowa Warrior, MD 530MG and UH-60 Blackhawk. As the player's rank increased, the RAH-66 Comanche and the AH-64B Apache Longbow were unlocked (the 'B' designation is due to the game being designed before the Longbow Apache was in service as the 'D' model). Using less powerful helicopters resulted in a higher mission score, though this had to be balanced with the likelihood of having enough fuel/weapons to complete the mission. Realistic tactics such as nap-of-the-earth flight and 'pop-up' attacks can be employed on account of the reasonably detailed terrain.

Planning is often an important part of the game: fuel consumption is unrealistically high (to adjust for a limited game world), and the player can rarely lift off with full fuel and the best weapons loaded. Terrain and enemy presence are also to be considered (the intel briefing may often tell the player what to expect near targets). Usually a Forward Arming Refuel Point (FARP) is present in the mission. This is important, as the player may have to refuel or rearm during the course of the mission depending on the density of enemy and distance to objectives.

On promotion to the rank of 2nd Lieutenant, the player may gain control of several other helicopter wingmen whose helicopters can also be configured to the same extent as the player's. Wingmen can remain with the player or be sent off for separate tasks (such as completing the secondary objective), so a great deal of flexibility is present for tactical planning.

The terrain modelling is much more advanced than in the original Gunship, with desert wadis and twisting ridgelines being well represented (this is very important for simulating helicopter combat, as cover using terrain is one of the primary tactics). The game has two primary theatres: the Middle East and Europe. Terrain was designed separately for each theatre; for instance, desert really was desert, and not just European farmland painted brown. Visuals in other areas were about on par for the private flight simulator technology at the time (the later PlayStation version of the game features much better graphics, including full textures on all 3D objects). Enemy forces include infantry, vehicles, tanks, anti-aircraft gun and missile systems, and airplanes. Other game objects included moving trains, civilian buildings, and even animals.

== Development ==
The cockpit graphics were based on photos of actual army helicopters, though switches and buttons with no in-game function were left out to avoid screen clutter.

== Expansion ==
MicroProse released the Gunship 2000: Islands & Ice expansion pack in 1992. It added two theatres of war (Antarctica and The Philippines), all previously released patches, and a mission editor. Gameplay followed closely on the heels of Gunship 2000, but added unique aspects for the two new theaters as well as a number of additional functions and new player aids, including: in-flight mission changes, air and artillery support, wind and weather (including whiteouts and magnetic disturbances in Antarctica), maintenance and weapon system downtimes, improved autopilot, targeting, navigation, and the addition of a HUD mission clock.

One of the most innovative features was the mission builder. This tool enabled players to create and edit missions of their own design. Every aspect of a typical Gunship 2000 mission was available for use in the mission builder. It also provided a number of shortcut steps to enable players to quickly create new missions without having to, for example, place every defender on the map one-by-one. Players can even export a standard Gunship 2000 mission into the mission builder as a template for editing. Once completed, mission could be saved for play, editing or free exchange with other players. Very advanced for its day, the mission builder set the tone for many follow on products by enabling players to determine fun by their own standards.

== Ports ==
A port of Gunship 2000 for the Atari Jaguar was announced in November 1993 after MicroProse was signed to be a third-party developer by Atari Corporation for the system, and despite kept being advertised for a late 1994 release, this version of the game went unreleased for unknown reasons.

The PlayStation version was re-released on the PlayStation Store for download on the PlayStation 3, PlayStation Portable and PlayStation Vita on November 17, 2010 in Europe and on March 18, 2014 in North America.

== Reception ==
In 1991, Computer Gaming World's reviewer, United States Army AH-64 pilot Bryan Walker, criticized Gunship 2000 for presenting a helicopter that "flies like an overloaded Huey", but nonetheless concluded that "the designers have succeeded in creating the best helicopter simulator game currently available, thorns included". Cited flaws included inaccurate flight models and avionics; awkward controls; and mediocre graphics and lack of ground texture. Strengths included a wide variety of accurately modeled weapons and the ability to control multiple types of helicopters in a squadron. 1992 and 1994 surveys in the magazine of wargames with modern settings gave the game four stars out of five, and the magazine named it one of 1992's best simulation games. The game received 5 out of 5 stars in Dragon. Compute! in 1992 said that Gunship 2000 was "the best helicopter simulation around", praising its gameplay, graphics, and manual.

Walker reported that the Islands and Ice expansion and patches provided an improved flight model, the option to fly with two joysticks and other peripherals, and target designation. He found that he could recreate missions from his career with the scenario editor with "surprising accuracy", and concluded that the expansion "has helped transform what was a mediocre title into a much better gaming value ... my vote as 'Most Improved Game of the Year'."

PlayStation Magazine gave the PlayStation version of Gunship 2000 a score of 7/10, calling it an "immersive helicopter flying sim with engrossing, varied missions." Next Generation gave it two out of five stars, remarking that "the shoddy graphics, sparse sound effects, and annoying gameplay will have you reaching for a pack of Tums."
