= List of Nintendo Switch games (H–P) =

This is part of the list of Nintendo Switch games.

== List ==
There are currently 4133 games across List of Nintendo Switch games (0–9), List of Nintendo Switch games (A–Am), List of Nintendo Switch games (An–Az), List of Nintendo Switch games (B), List of Nintendo Switch games (C–G), this page (H–P), and List of Nintendo Switch games (Q–Z).

List of Nintendo Switch games
Title	Developer(s)	Publisher(s)	Release date	Ref.
Hades	Supergiant Games	Supergiant Games	September 17, 2020	
Hades II	Supergiant Games	Supergiant Games	September 25, 2025	
Hakoniwa Explorer Plus	Suxamethonium	Playism	June 18, 2020	
Hakokoro V	AMZY	AMZY	April 4, 2024	
Hakuoki Ibun: Berezinskii no Majo	Otomate	Idea Factory	TBA	
Hakuoki Shinkai: Ginsei no Shou	Otomate	Idea Factory	July 30, 2020	
Half Past Fate	Serenity Forge	Way Down Deep	March 12, 2020	
Hammerwatch	Crackshell	BlitWorks	December 14, 2017	
Hand of Fate 2	Defiant Development	Defiant Development	July 17, 2018	
Happy Game	Amanita Design	Amanita Design	October 28, 2021	
Hard West: Complete Edition	Forever Entertainment	Forever Entertainment	March 7, 2019	
Harmony: The Fall of Reverie	Don't Nod	Don't Nod	June 8, 2020	
Harry Potter: Quidditch Champions	Unbroken Studios	Warner Bros. Games	November 8, 2024	
Harukanaru Toki no Naka de 7	Ruby Party	Koei Tecmo	June 18, 2020	
Harvest Moon: Echoes of Teradea	Natsume Inc.	NA: Natsume Inc.; PAL: Rising Star Games	September 24, 2026	
Harvest Moon: Light of Hope	Natsume Inc.	NA: Natsume Inc.; PAL: Rising Star Games	May 29, 2018	
Harvest Moon: Mad Dash	Natsume Inc.	Natsume Inc.	October 29, 2019	
Harvest Moon: One World	Natsume Inc.	NA: Natsume Inc.; PAL: Rising Star Games	March 2, 2021	
Harvestella	Square Enix	Square Enix	November 4, 2022	
Has-Been Heroes	Frozenbyte	GameTrust	March 28, 2017	
Hashihime of the Old Book Town Append	HuneX	HuneX	December 16, 2021	
A Hat in Time	Gears for Breakfast	Humble Bundle	October 18, 2019	
Hatsune Miku: Project Diva Mega Mix	Sega AM2	Sega	February 13, 2020	
Hatsune Miku: Tsunageru Puzzle Tamagotori	Crypton Future Media	Crypton Future Media	January 27, 2022	
Haven	The Game Bakers	The Game Bakers	February 4, 2021	
Haven Park	BubbleStudio	Mooneye	August 5, 2021	
Headliner: NoviNews	Unbound Creations	Unbound Creations	September 5, 2019	
Headsnatchers	IguanaBee	Iceberg Interactive	November 7, 2019	
Heartworm	Vincent Adinolfi	DreadXP	October 1, 2026	
Heart of the Woods	Studio Elan, Ratalaika Games	Sekai Games	July 8, 2021	
Heave Ho	Le Cartel	Devolver Digital	August 29, 2019	
Heaven Dust	One Gruel Studio	Indienova	February 27, 2020	
Heaven's Vault	Inkle	Inkle	January 28, 2021	
Hell Pie	Sluggerfly	Headup Games	July 21, 2022	
Hellblade: Senua's Sacrifice	Ninja Theory	Ninja Theory	April 11, 2019	
Hellboy Web of Wyrd	Upstream Arcade	Good Shepherd Entertainment	October 18, 2023	
Hello Kitty and Friends: Happiness Parade	Dabadu Games	Rogue Games	April 13, 2024	
Hello Kitty Island Adventure	Sunblink	Sunblink	January 30, 2025	
Hello Kitty Kruisers	Scarab Entertainment	Rising Star Games	April 24, 2018	
Hello Neighbor	Dynamic Pixels	TinyBuild	July 27, 2018	
Hello Neighbor: Hide and Seek	Dynamic Pixels	TinyBuild	December 7, 2018	
Hellpoint	Cradle Games	TinyBuild	February 25, 2021	
Her Majesty's Spiffing	Billy Goat Entertainment	Billy Goat Entertainment	February 1, 2018	
Herdling	Okomotive	Panic	August 21, 2025	
Hero Must Die. Again	Pyramid, G-Mode	Degica Games	February 27, 2020	
Heroland	Netchubiyori	JP: FuRyu; NA: Xseed Games; PAL: Marvelous Europe	October 4, 2018	
Hextech Mayhem: A League of Legends Story	Choice Provisions	Riot Forge	November 16, 2021	
Hide & Dance!	hap Inc.	Kemco	October 1, 2020	
Hidden Folks	Adriaan de Jongh	Adriaan de Jongh	October 31, 2018	
High on Life	Squanch Games	Squanch Games	May 6, 2025	
Higurashi no Naku Koro ni Hou	07th Expansion	Entergram	July 26, 2018	
Himehibi: Another Princess Days ~White or Black~	Takuyo	Takuyo	December 10, 2020	
Himehibi: Princess Days	Takuyo	Takuyo	September 10, 2020	
Hindsight 20/20: Wrath of the Raakshasa	Triple-I Games	Triple-I Games	September 9, 2021	
Hitman 3: Cloud Version	IO Interactive	IO Interactive	January 20, 2021	
Hoa	Skrollcat Studio	Skrollcat Studio	August 21, 2021	
Hob: The Definitive Edition	Runic Games, Panic Button	Perfect World Entertainment	April 3, 2019	
Hogwarts Legacy	Avalanche Software	Portkey Games	November 14, 2023	
The Hokkaido Serial Murder Case: The Okhotsk Disappearance ~Memories in Ice, Tearful Figurine~	G-Mode		September 12, 2024	
Hokko Life	Wonderscope	Team17	September 27, 2022	
Hollow	MMEU	Forever Entertainment	February 22, 2018	
Hollow Knight	Team Cherry	Team Cherry	June 12, 2018	
Hollow Knight: Silksong	Team Cherry	Team Cherry	September 4, 2025	
Holy Potatoes! A Weapon Shop?!	Daylight Studios	Rising Star Games	July 12, 2018	
Home Sheep Home: Farmageddon Party Edition	Aardman Animations	JP: Greenlight Games; WW: Aardman Animations	October 18, 2019	
Honey Vibes	Otomate	Idea Factory	October 3, 2024	
The Hong Kong Massacre	Vreski	Untold Tales	December 26, 2020	
Horace	Paul Helman, Sean Scapelhorn	505 Games	October 21, 2020	
Horizon Chase Turbo	Aquiris Game Studio	Aquiris Game Studio	July 30, 2019	
Horned Knight	Josep Monzonis Hernandez	JP: EastAsiaSoft; WW: 2Awesome Studios	February 26, 2021	
Hot Gimmick: Axes-jong	Zerodiv	Zerodiv	July 4, 2019	
Hot Springs Story	Kairosoft	Samsung Electronics	October 11, 2018	
Hot Wheels Unleashed	Milestone	JP: Koch Media; WW: Milestone	September 30, 2021	
Hotel Sowls	CFK	CFK	July 30, 2020	
Hotel Transylvania 3: Monsters Overboard	Torus Games	NA: Outright Games; PAL: Bandai Namco Entertainment	July 10, 2018	
Hotline Miami Collection	Dennaton Games	Devolver Digital	August 19, 2019	
Hototogisu Tairan 1553: Ryuuko Aiutsu	Granzella	Granzella	April 26, 2018	
The House of the Dead 2	Forever Entertainment	Forever Entertainment	August 7, 2025	
The House of the Dead: Remake	MegaPixel Studios	Forever Entertainment	April 7, 2022	
How To Take Off Your Mask Remastered	Roseverte	Ratalaika Games	February 4, 2021	
Hue	Fiddlesticks Games	JP: Digital Bards; WW: Curve Digital	June 6, 2019	
Human: Fall Flat	No Brakes Games	JP: Teyon; WW: Curve Digital	December 7, 2017	
Human Resource Machine	Tomorrow Corporation	Tomorrow Corporation	March 16, 2017	
Hungry Shark World	Ubisoft	Ubisoft	July 17, 2018	
Huntdown	Easy Trigger Games	Coffee Stain Publishing	May 12, 2020	
Hyper Light Drifter	Heart Machine	Abylight	September 6, 2018	
Hypercharge: Unboxed	Digital Cybercherries	Digital Cybercherries	January 31, 2020	
Hyperforma	Nord Unit	HeroCraft	September 5, 2019	
HyperParasite	Troglobytes Games	JP: EastAsiaSoft; NA: Houndpicked Games; PAL: QubicGames	April 2, 2020	
Hypnosis Mic: Alternative Rap Battle – 1st Period	Altergear	Idea Factory	December 19, 2024	
Hypnosis Mic: Alternative Rap Battle – 2nd Period	Altergear	Idea Factory	TBA	
Hypnospace Outlaw	Tendershoot	No More Robots	August 27, 2020	
Hyrule Warriors: Age of Calamity	Koei Tecmo, Omega Force	Nintendo	November 20, 2020	
Hyrule Warriors: Definitive Edition	Omega Force, Team Ninja	Nintendo	March 22, 2018	
I-Chu	OperaHouse	D3 Publisher	November 10, 2022	
I Am Adventure Boy: Ultimate Escape Island	Three Rings	TBS Games	TBA	
I Am Dead	Hollow Ponds	Annapurna Interactive	October 8, 2020	
I Am Setsuna	Tokyo RPG Factory	Square Enix	March 3, 2017	
I Am the Hero	Crazyant	Ratalaika Games	November 22, 2018	
I and Me	Wish Fang	Ratalaika Games	July 6, 2017	
I Hate Running Backwards	Binx Interactive	Devolver Digital	October 19, 2018	
I Was a Teenage Exocolonist	Northway Games	Finji	August 25, 2022	
I, Zombie	Awesome Game Studio	Awesome Game Studio	March 8, 2018	
Ibb & Obb	Sparpweed	Sparpweed	March 5, 2020	
Ice Age: Scrat's Nutty Adventure	Just Add Water	Outright Games	October 18, 2019	
Icewind Dale: Enhanced Edition	Beamdog	Skybound Games	October 15, 2019	
Icey	X.D. Network	X.D. Network	May 31, 2018	
Iconoclasts	Joakim Sandberg	Bifrost Entertainment	August 2, 2018	
IdolDays	Qureate	Qureate	June 17, 2021	
Idol Manager	Glitch Pitch	Playism	August 25, 2022	
If Found...	Dreamfeel	Annapurna Interactive	October 22, 2020	
If My Heart Had Wings	Pulltop	MoeNovel	September 5, 2019	
Ikai	Endflame	PM Studios	March 29, 2022	
Ikaruga	Treasure	Nicalis	May 29, 2018	
Ikenfell	Happy Ray Games	Humble Games	October 8, 2020	
Illmatic Envelope Swamp	RS34	RS34	October 14, 2021	
Illusion of Itehari	LicoBiTs	Broccoli	April 11, 2024	
Illusion of L'Phalcia	Exe Create	Kemco	August 1, 2019	
Illvelo Swamp Happy Together	RS34	Mebius	TBA	
Immortal Planet	Teedoubleu Games	Monster Couch	December 6, 2019	
Immortal Realms: Vampire Wars	Palindrome	Kalypso Media	August 28, 2020	
Immortals Fenyx Rising	Ubisoft Quebec	Ubisoft	December 3, 2020	
Implosion: Never Lose Hope	Rayark, Esquadra	Flyhigh Works	July 5, 2017	
In Other Waters	Jump Over The Age	Fellow Traveller	April 3, 2020	
Inazuma Eleven: Victory Road	Level-5	Level-5	November 13, 2025	
Incredible Mandy	Dotoyou Games	Circle Entertainment	November 7, 2019	
Indie Pogo	Lowe Bros. Studios	Lowe Bros. Studios	TBA	
Indivisible	Lab Zero Games	JP: Spike Chunsoft; WW: 505 Games	April 28, 2020	
Inertial Drift	Level 91 Entertainment	PQube	September 11, 2020	
Infection Maze	Masatoko Games	Masatoko Games	July 29, 2021	
The Infectious Madness of Doctor Dekker	D'Avekki Studios	Wales Interactive	June 5, 2018	
Infernax	Berzerk Studio	The Arcade Crew	February 14, 2022	
Infernium	Carlos Coronado	Undercoders	April 5, 2018	
Infinite Minigolf	Zen Studios	Zen Studios	July 28, 2017	
Inked: A Tale of Love	Somnium Games	Pixmain	August 26, 2021	
The Inner World: The Last Wind Monk	Studio Fizbin	Headup Games	July 18, 2018	
InnerSpace	PolyKnight Games	Aspyr	January 16, 2018	
Inscryption	Daniel Mullins Games	Devolver Digital	December 1, 2022	
Inside	Playdead	Playdead	June 28, 2018	
In Sound Mind	We Create Stuff	Modus Games	October 11, 2022	
Into the Breach	Subset Games	Subset Games	August 28, 2018	
Into the Dead 2	Pikpok	Versus Evil	October 25, 2019	
Inuwashi: Urabure Tantei to Ojou-sama Keiji no Ikebukuro Jiken File	Orange	Orange	March 26, 2020	
Inversus Deluxe	Hypersect	Hypersect	September 28, 2017	
Invisible, Inc.	Klei Entertainment	Klei Entertainment	June 15, 2020	
Ion Fury	Voidpoint	3D Realms	May 14, 2020	
Irem Collection Vol. 1	Irem	ININ Games	November 21, 2023	
Irem Collection Vol. 2	Irem	ININ Games	February 20, 2024	
Irem Collection Vol. 3	Irem	ININ Games	July 1, 2025	
Iris.Fall	NExT Studios	PM Studios	January 7, 2021	
Iris and the Giant	Louis Rigaud	Plug In Digital	November 5, 2020	
Iro Hero	Artax Games	EastAsiaSoft	June 7, 2018	
Ironcast	Dreadbit	Ripstone	August 10, 2017	
Is It Wrong to Try to Pick Up Girls in a Dungeon? Infinite Combat	5pb.	5pb.	November 28, 2019	
Is This Seat Taken?	Poti Poti Studio	Wholesome Games	August 7, 2025	
Ise Shima Mystery Guide: The False Black Pearl	Happymeal	Flyhigh Works	January 24, 2019	
Island	Frontwing	Prototype	April 8, 2021	
Islanders	Grizzly Games	Coatsink	August 11, 2021	
Island Saver	Stormcloud Games	National Wetminster Bank	May 13, 2020	
Issho ni Asobo Koupen-chan	Neos Corporation	Neos Corporation	September 24, 2020	
It Takes Two	Hazelight Studios	Electronic Arts	November 4, 2022	
Itta	Glass Revolver	Armor Games Studios	April 22, 2020	
Ittle Dew	Ludosity	Nicalis	August 15, 2019	
Ittle Dew 2+	Ludosity	Nicalis	March 19, 2020	
IxShe Tell	Hooksoft	Entergram	January 30, 2020	
Jack Axe	Keybol Games	Neon Doctrine	October 7, 2021	
Jack Jeanne	Broccoli	Broccoli	March 18, 2021	
Jack Move	So Romantic	HypeTrain Digital	September 8, 2022	
The Jackbox Party Pack	Jackbox Games	Jackbox Games	August 17, 2017	
The Jackbox Party Pack 2	Jackbox Games	Jackbox Games	August 17, 2017	
The Jackbox Party Pack 3	Jackbox Games	Jackbox Games	April 13, 2017	
The Jackbox Party Pack 4	Jackbox Games	Jackbox Games	October 19, 2017	
The Jackbox Party Pack 5	Jackbox Games	Jackbox Games	October 17, 2018	
The Jackbox Party Pack 6	Jackbox Games	Jackbox Games	October 17, 2019	
The Jackbox Party Pack 7	Jackbox Games	Jackbox Games	October 15, 2020	
The Jackbox Party Pack 8	Jackbox Games	Jackbox Games	October 14, 2021	
The Jackbox Party Pack 9	Jackbox Games	Jackbox Games	October 20, 2022	
The Jackbox Party Starter	Jackbox Games	Jackbox Games	June 30, 2022	
Jamestown+	Final Form Games	Final Form Games	December 12, 2019	
Jang-Navi Mahjong Online	Winlight	Winlight	February 8, 2018	
J.B. Harold Murder Club	Riverhillsoft	Mebius	August 10, 2017	
Japanese Rail Sim: Journey to Kyoto	Sonic Powered	Sonic Powered	November 28, 2019	
Jenny LeClue: Detectivú	Mografi	Mografi	August 26, 2020	
Jeopardy!	Ubisoft	Ubisoft	October 30, 2018	
Jet Kave Adventure	7Levels	JP: Circle Entertainment; WW: 7Levels	September 17, 2019	
Jikkyou Powerful Pro Baseball	Konami	Konami	June 27, 2019	
Joe Dever's Lone Wolf	Reply Forge	Reply Forge	February 16, 2018	
Joe & Mac Retro Collection	Red Art Games	Red Art Games	October 29, 2026	
John Wick Hex	Bithell Games	Good Shepherd Entertainment	December 4, 2020	
JoJo's Bizarre Adventure: All Star Battle R	CyberConnect2	Bandai Namco Entertainment	September 1, 2022	
Jotun: Valhalla Edition	Thunder Lotus Games	Thunder Lotus Games	April 27, 2018	
The Journey Down: Chapter One	Skygoblin	BlitWorks	June 21, 2018	
The Journey Down: Chapter Two	Skygoblin	BlitWorks	July 5, 2018	
The Journey Down: Chapter Three	Skygoblin	BlitWorks	June 28, 2018	
Journey to the Savage Planet	Typhoon Studios	JP: H2 Interactive; WW: 505 Games	May 21, 2020	
A Juggler's Tale	Kaleidoscube	Mixtvision Games	September 29, 2021	
Juicy Realm	SpaceCan Studio	X.D. Network	November 7, 2019	
Jumanji: The Video Game	Funsolve	Outright Games	November 8, 2019	
Jump Force	Spike Chunsoft	Bandai Namco Entertainment	August 27, 2020	
Jump King	Nexile	JP: Pikii; WW: Ukiyo Publishing	June 9, 2020	
Jump Rope Challenge	Nintendo EPD	Nintendo	June 15, 2020	
Jumping Joe & Friends	QubicGames, Vixa Games	QubicGames	May 25, 2018	
Jurassic World Evolution	Frontier Developments	Frontier Developments	November 3, 2020	
Just Dance 2017	Ubisoft Paris	Ubisoft	March 3, 2017	
Just Dance 2018	Ubisoft Paris	Ubisoft	October 24, 2017	
Just Dance 2019	Ubisoft Paris	Ubisoft	October 23, 2018	
Just Dance 2020	Ubisoft Paris	Ubisoft	November 5, 2019	
Just Dance 2021	Ubisoft Paris	Ubisoft	November 12, 2020	
Just Dance 2022	Ubisoft Paris	Ubisoft	November 4, 2021	
Just Dance 2023 Edition	Ubisoft Paris	Ubisoft	November 22, 2022	
Just Dance 2024 Edition	Ubisoft Paris	Ubisoft	October 24, 2023	
Just Dance 2025 Edition	Ubisoft Paris	Ubisoft	October 15, 2024	
Just Dance 2026 Edition	Ubisoft Paris	Ubisoft	October 14, 2025	
Just Dance: Decades of Hits	Ubisoft Paris	Ubisoft	October 13, 2026	
Just Shapes & Beats	Berzserk Studio	Berzserk Studio	May 31, 2018	
Justice League: Cosmic Chaos	PHL Collective	Outright Games	March 10, 2023	
Jydge	10tons	10tons	October 19, 2017	
Kaleidoscope of Phantom Prison	07th Expansion	Entergram	December 17, 2020	
Kamaitachi no Yoru ×3		Spike Chunsoft	September 19, 2024	
Kamen Rider: Climax Scramble Zi-O	Bandai Namco Studios	Bandai Namco Entertainment	November 29, 2018	
Kamen Rider: Memory of Heroez	Bandai Namco	Bandai Namco	October 29, 2020	
Kamiko	Skipmore	Flyhigh Works	April 13, 2017	
Kaminazo: Mirai kara no Omoi de	Gift Ten Industry	DelightWorks	November 28, 2019	
Kamiwaza: Way of the Thief	Acquire	JP: Acquire; WW: NIS America	October 11, 2022	
Kanon	Key	Prototype	April 20, 2023	
Kao the Kangaroo	Tate Multimedia	Tate Multimedia	May 27, 2022	
KarmaZoo	Pastagames	Devolver Digital	November 14, 2023	
Katamari Damacy Reroll	Bandai Namco Studios	Bandai Namco Entertainment	December 7, 2018	
Katana Kami: A Way of the Samurai Story	Acquire	Spike Chunsoft	February 20, 2020	
Katana Zero	Askiisoft	Devolver Digital	April 18, 2019	
Kathy Rain	Clifftop Games	Raw Fury	October 26, 2021	
Kawaii Deathu Desu	Pippin Games, Top Hat Studios	EastAsiaSoft	April 16, 2020	
Keen: One Girl Army	Cat Nigiri	Phoenixx	July 2, 2020	
Keep Talking and Nobody Explodes	Steel Crate Games	Steel Crate Games	August 16, 2018	
Keiji J.B. Harold no Jikenbo: Manhattan Requiem	Mebius	Mebius	October 26, 2017	
Keiken Zero na Classmate	Prekano	Entergram	October 28, 2021	
Kemono Friends Picross	Jupiter Corporation	Jupiter Corporation	October 4, 2018	
Kentucky Route Zero: TV Edition	Cardboard Computer	Annapurna Interactive	January 28, 2020	
Kero Blaster	Studio Pixel	Playism	August 23, 2018	
Ketsu Battler	KAYAC	KAYAC	December 12, 2024	
KeyWe	Stonewheat & Sons	JP: Game Source Entertainment; WW: Sold Out	August 31, 2021	
Kholat	Imgn Pro	Imgn Pro	May 14, 2020	
The Kids We Were: Complete Edition	Gagex	Gagex	January 26, 2022	
Kill It With Fire	Casey Donnellan Games	TinyBuild	March 4, 2021	
Kill la Kill: If	A+ Games	WW: Arc System Works; PAL: PQube	July 25, 2019	
Killer Frequency	Team17	Team17	June 1, 2023	
Killer Queen Black	Bumblebear Games	Bumblebear Games	October 11, 2019	
Kimi wa Yukima ni Koinegau	Idea Factory	JP: Idea Factory; WW: Aksys Games	July 29, 2021	
Kine	Gwen Frey	Gwen Frey	October 17, 2019	
King of Fighters R-2	Code Mystics	SNK	August 6, 2020	
King of Seas	3DClouds	Team17	May 25, 2021	
The King's Bird	Serenity Forge	Graffiti Games	February 12, 2019	
King's Bounty II	1C Company	Prime Matter	August 24, 2021	
Kingdom: New Lands	Noio and Licorice	Raw Fury	September 13, 2017	
Kingdom: Two Crowns	Noio and Licorice	Raw Fury	December 11, 2018	
Kingdom Come: Deliverance	Warhorse Studios, Saber Interactive	Prime Matter	March 15, 2024	
Kingdom Hearts III	Square Enix	Square Enix	February 10, 2022	
Kingdom Hearts HD 1.5 Remix	Square Enix	Square Enix	February 10, 2022	
Kingdom Hearts HD 2.5 Remix	Square Enix	Square Enix	February 10, 2022	
Kingdom Hearts HD 2.8 Final Chapter Prologue	Square Enix	Square Enix	February 10, 2022	
Kingdom Hearts: Melody of Memory	Square Enix	Square Enix	November 11, 2020	
Kingdom Rush: Frontiers	Ironhide Game Studio	Ironhide Game Studio	February 27, 2020	
Kingdoms of Amalur: Re-Reckoning	Kaiko	THQ Nordic	March 16, 2021	
Kings of Paradise	Voltage	Voltage	May 27, 2021	
Kirby and the Forgotten Land	HAL Laboratory	Nintendo	March 25, 2022	
Kirby Fighters 2	HAL Laboratory, Vanpool	Nintendo	September 23, 2020	
Kirby Star Allies	HAL Laboratory	Nintendo	March 16, 2018	
Kirby's Dream Buffet	HAL Laboratory	Nintendo	August 17, 2022	
Kirby's Return to Dream Land Deluxe	HAL Laboratory	Nintendo	February 24, 2023	
Kishi Fujii Souta no Shogi Training	Game Studio	Game Studio	March 5, 2020	
Kissed by the Baddest Bidder	Voltage	Voltage	November 28, 2019	
Kitaria Fables	MassHive Media	PQube	September 2, 2021	
Kitsune Tails	Kitsune Games, MidBoss	Ratalaika Games	TBA	
Kitten Squad	Arcade Distillery	People for the Ethical Treatment of Animals	May 10, 2018	
Klang 2	Tinimations	Ratalaika Games	November 17, 2021	
Klonoa Phantasy Reverie Series	Monkey Craft	Bandai Namco Entertainment	July 7, 2022	
Knights and Bikes	Foam Sword Games	JP: Playism; WW: Double Fine Productions	February 6, 2020	
Knights in the Nightmare Remaster	Sting	Sting	April 7, 2022	
Knights of Pen and Paper +1 Deluxier Edition	Behold Studios, Seaven Studio	JP: Worker Bee; WW: Plug In Digital	May 29, 2018	
Knockout City	Velan Studios	Electronic Arts	May 21, 2021	
Knockout Home Fitness	Pocket	JP: Pocket; NA: Xseed Games; PAL: Marvelous Europe	October 29, 2020	
Kochira, Haha Naru Hoshi Yori	Daisyworld	Nippon Ichi Software	October 28, 2021	
Koi DX	Circle Entertainment	Circle Entertainment	October 5, 2017	
Koi no Hanasaku Hyakkaen	Takuyo	Takuyo	January 30, 2020	
Koi Suru Otome to Shugo no Tate – Re:boot The "Shield-9"	Giga	Entergram	November 26, 2020	
Kona	Parabole	Koch Media	March 9, 2018	
KonoSuba: God's Blessing on this Wonderful World! Labyrinth of Hope and the Gathering of Adventurers! Plus	Entergram	Entergram	August 27, 2020	
KonoSuba: God's Blessing on this Wonderful World! Love for this Tempting Attire	Mages	Mages	September 24, 2020	
Kotoba no Puzzle: Mojipittan Encore	Bandai Namco	Bandai Namco	April 2, 2020	
Kotodama: The 7 Mysteries of Fujisawa	Art Co., Ltd	PQube	May 31, 2019	
Kowloon Youma Gakuen Ki: Origin of Adventure	Toy Box	Arc System Works	June 4, 2020	
Kowloon's Gate VR: Suzaku	Jetman	Jetman	TBA	
Kowloon's Rhizome: A Day of the Fire	MCF, Uani Studio	Uani Studio	TBA	
KukkoroDays	Qureate	Qureate	August 6, 2020	
Kunai	TurtleBlaze	JP: Intra Games; WW: The Arcade Crew	February 6, 2020	
Kunio-kun: The World Classics Collection	Technōs Japan	Arc System Works	December 20, 2018	
Kusan: City of Wolves	CIRCLEfromDOT	PQube	July 30, 2026	
Kwaidan: Azuma Manor Story	Gudouan	Rainy Frog	August 20, 2020	
Kyukyoku Tiger-Heli	M2	M2	October 28, 2021	
L.A. Noire	Team Bondi, Virtuos	Rockstar Games	November 14, 2017	
La-Mulana	Nigoro	Playism	March 17, 2020	
La-Mulana 2	Nigoro	Playism	March 17, 2020	
Labyrinth of Refrain: Coven of Dusk	Nippon Ichi Software	Nippon Ichi Software	September 18, 2018	
Labyrinth Legend	Shinobi Games	JP: Regista; WW: NIS America	January 28, 2021	
Laid-Back Camp: Have a Nice Day!	Mages	Mages	November 11, 2021	
Laid-Back Camp -Virtual- Fumoto Campsite	Gemdrops	Gemdrops	April 8, 2021	
Laid-Back Camp -Virtual- Lake Motosu	Gemdrops	Gemdrops	March 4, 2021	
Laika: Aged Through Blood	Brainwash Gang	Headup Games	January 30, 2025	
Lair of the Clockwork God	Size Five Games	Size Five Games	September 4, 2020	
Lake	Gamious	Whitethorn Games	February 15, 2024	
Langrisser I & II HD Remastered	Chara-Ani	JP: Kadokawa Games; WW: NIS America	April 18, 2019	
The Language of Love	ebi-hime	Ratalaika Games	October 30, 2020	
Lanota	Noxy Games	Noxy Games	June 14, 2018	
The Lara Croft Collection	Feral Interactive	Square Enix	June 29, 2023	
The Last Blade: Beyond the Destiny	SNK	SNK	October 28, 2020	
The Last Campfire	Hello Games	Hello Games	August 27, 2020	
The Last Cube	Improx Games	Improx Games	March 10, 2022	
Last Day of June	Ovosonico	505 Games	March 16, 2018	
The Last Door	The Game Kitchen	Plug In Digital	May 22, 2019	
The Last Friend	Stonebot Studio, Skystone Games	Skystone Games	April 7, 2022	
Last Light	Team Corn Field	Crest	TBA	
The Last Remnant Remastered	Square Enix	Square Enix	June 10, 2019	
Last Stop	Variable State	Annapurna Interactive	July 22, 2021	
The Last Worker	Wolf & Wood, Oiffy	Wired Productions	March 30, 2023	
Later Alligator	SmallBu, Pillow Fight	Pillow Fight	March 16, 2021	
Layers of Fear: Legacy	Bloober Team	JP: Circle Entertainment; WW: Aspyr	February 21, 2018	
Layers of Fear 2	Bloober Team	JP: NA Publishing; WW: Bloober Team	May 20, 2021	
Layton's Mystery Journey	Level-5	Level-5	August 9, 2018	
League of Evil	Ravenous Games	Ratalaika Games	August 31, 2017	
Learn with Nanami! Listening and Reading Test Complete Master	Media5	Media5	December 21, 2017	
Legacy of Kain: Soul Reaver 1 & 2 Remastered	Aspyr	Aspyr	December 10, 2024	
Legal Dungeon	Somi	Playism	February 25, 2021	
The Legend of Bum-bo	Edmund McMillen, James Interactive	Nicalis	June 29, 2022	
The Legend of Dark Witch	Inside System	Inside System	October 24, 2019	
The Legend of Heroes: Trails at Sunrise	UserJoy Technology	Nihon Falcom	August 27, 2019	
The Legend of Heroes: Trails Beyond the Horizon	Nihon Falcom	NIS America	January 15, 2026	
The Legend of Heroes: Trails from Zero	Nihon Falcom	NIS America	February 25, 2021	
The Legend of Heroes: Trails into Reverie	Nihon Falcom	NIS America	August 26, 2021	
The Legend of Heroes: Trails of Cold Steel	Nihon Falcom, Clouded Leopard Entertainment	Nihon Falcom	July 8, 2021	
The Legend of Heroes: Trails of Cold Steel II	Nihon Falcom, Clouded Leopard Entertainment	Nihon Falcom	August 5, 2021	
The Legend of Heroes: Trails of Cold Steel III	Nihon Falcom, Engine Software	JP: Nippon Ichi Software; WW: NIS America	March 19, 2020	
The Legend of Heroes: Trails of Cold Steel IV	Nihon Falcom, Engine Software	JP: Nippon Ichi Software; WW: NIS America	March 18, 2021	
The Legend of Heroes: Trails to Azure	Nihon Falcom	NIS America	April 22, 2021	
The Legend of Heroes: Trails Through Daybreak	Nihon Falcom	NIS America	July 5, 2024	
The Legend of Heroes: Trails Through Daybreak II	Nihon Falcom	NIS America	February 14, 2025	
Legend of Keepers: Career of a Dungeon Manager	Goblinz Studio	Goblinz Studio	April 29, 2021	
The Legend of Nayuta: Boundless Trails	Nihon Falcom, PH3 Games	JP: Nihon Falcom; WW: NIS America	May 26, 2022	
Legend of Kay	Kaiko	THQ Nordic	May 29, 2018	
Legend of Mana	Square Enix	Square Enix	June 24, 2021	
The Legend of Zelda: Breath of the Wild	Nintendo EPD	Nintendo	March 3, 2017	
The Legend of Zelda: Echoes of Wisdom	Nintendo EPD	Nintendo	September 26, 2024	
The Legend of Zelda: Link's Awakening	Grezzo	Nintendo	September 20, 2019	
The Legend of Zelda: Skyward Sword HD	Tantalus Media	Nintendo	July 16, 2021	
The Legend of Zelda: Tears of the Kingdom	Nintendo EPD	Nintendo	May 12, 2023	
Legends of Ethernal	Lucid Dreams Studio	JP: NA Publishing; WW: Natsume Inc.	September 24, 2020	
Lego 2K Drive	Visual Concepts	2K	May 19, 2023	
Lego Brawls	RED Games	The Lego Group	September 2, 2022	
Lego Builder's Journey	Light Brick Studio	The Lego Group	June 22, 2021	
Lego City Undercover	TT Fusion	Warner Bros. Interactive Entertainment	April 4, 2017	
Lego DC Super-Villains	TT Fusion	Warner Bros. Interactive Entertainment	October 16, 2018	
Lego Harry Potter Collection	TT Games	Warner Bros. Interactive Entertainment	October 30, 2018	
Lego Horizon Adventures	Guerrilla Games; Studio Gobo	Sony Interactive Entertainment	November 14, 2024	
Lego The Incredibles	TT Games	Warner Bros. Interactive Entertainment	June 15, 2018	
Lego Jurassic World	TT Games	Warner Bros. Interactive Entertainment	September 17, 2019	
Lego Marvel Super Heroes	TT Games	Warner Bros. Interactive Entertainment	October 5, 2021	
Lego Marvel Super Heroes 2	TT Games	Warner Bros. Interactive Entertainment	November 14, 2017	
The Lego Movie 2 Videogame	TT Games	Warner Bros. Interactive Entertainment	February 26, 2019	
Lego Ninjago Movie Video Game	TT Games	Warner Bros. Interactive Entertainment	September 22, 2017	
Lego Star Wars: The Skywalker Saga	TT Games	Warner Bros. Interactive Entertainment	April 5, 2022	
Lego Worlds	TT Games	Warner Bros. Interactive Entertainment	September 5, 2017	
Legrand Legacy: Tale of the Fatebounds	Semisoft	Another Indie	January 24, 2019	
Leisure Suit Larry: Wet Dreams Don't Dry	CrazyBunch	Assemble Entertainment	June 13, 2019	
Leisure Suit Larry: Wet Dreams Dry Twice	CrazyBunch	Assemble Entertainment	May 18, 2021	
Let's Sing 2018	Voxler	Ravenscourt	November 24, 2017	
Let's Sing 2019	Voxler	Ravenscourt	October 25, 2018	
Let's Sing 2020	Voxler	Ravenscourt	October 25, 2019	
Let's Sing Country	Voxler	Koch Media	October 25, 2019	
Let's Sing Queen	Voxler	Koch Media	October 25, 2019	
Lethal League Blaze	Team Reptile	JP: Oizumi Amuzio; WW: Team Reptile	July 12, 2019	
Levelhead	Butterscotch Shenanigans	Butterscotch Shenanigans	April 30, 2020	
The Liar Princess and the Blind Prince	Nippon Ichi Software	Nippon Ichi Software	May 31, 2018	
Liberated	Atomic Wolf	Walkabout Games	June 2, 2020	
Library of Ruina	Project Moon	Arc System Works	April 25, 2024	
Lichtspeer: Double Speer Edition	Lichthund	Crunching Koalas	September 7, 2017	
Life Is Strange	Dontnod Entertainment	Square Enix	February 1, 2022	
Life Is Strange 2	Dontnod Entertainment	Square Enix	February 2, 2023	
Life Is Strange: Before the Storm	Dontnod Entertainment	Square Enix	February 1, 2022	
Life Is Strange: True Colors	Deck Nine	Square Enix	December 7, 2021	
Lil Gator Game	Megawobble	Playtonic Friends	December 14, 2022	
Lil' Guardsman	Hilltop Studios	Versus Evil, TinyBuild	January 23, 2024	
Limbo	Playdead	Playdead	June 28, 2018	
Lisa: Definitive Edition	Dingaling Productions	Serenity Forge	July 18, 2023	
Little Busters!	Key	Prototype	April 23, 2020	
Little Devil Inside	Neostream Interactive	Neostream Interactive	TBA	
Little Dragons Café	Aksys Games	Aksys Games	August 24, 2018	
Little Friends: Dogs & Cats	Neilo	Imagineer	December 6, 2018	
Little Goody Two Shoes	AstralShiftPro	Square Enix Collective	October 31, 2023	
Little Inferno	Tomorrow Corporation	Tomorrow Corporation	March 16, 2017	
Little Kitty, Big City	Double Dagger Studio	Double Dagger Studio	May 9, 2024	
Little Nightmares	Tarsier Studios	Bandai Namco Entertainment	May 18, 2018	
Little Nightmares II	Tarsier Studios	Bandai Namco Entertainment	February 11, 2021	
Little Nightmares III	Supermassive Games	Bandai Namco Entertainment	October 10, 2025	
Little Noah: Scion of Paradise	Cygames, Grounding	Cygames	June 28, 2022	
Little Rocket Lab	Teenage Astronauts	No More Robots	December 10, 2025	
Little Town Hero	Game Freak	Game Freak	October 16, 2019	
Live A Live	Square Enix	Square Enix	July 22, 2022	
Livestream: Escape from Hotel Izanami	Qureate	Qureate	April 15, 2021	
Llamasoft: The Jeff Minter Story	Digital Eclipse	Digital Eclipse	March 13, 2024	
Loco Motive	Robust Game	Chucklefish	November 21, 2024	
Lode Runner Legacy	Tozai Games	Tozai Games	March 29, 2018	
L.O.L Surprise! B.Bs Born to Travel	Xaloc Studios	Outright Games	October 7, 2022	
L.O.L. Surprise! Movie Night	Nighthawk Interactive	Nighthawk Interactive	October 26, 2021	
L.O.L Surprise! Remix: We Rule The World	Maestro Interactive Games	Nighthawk Interactive	November 3, 2020	
The Long Dark	Hinterland Studio	Hinterland Studio	September 17, 2020	
The Long Reach	Painted Black Games	Painted Black Games	March 15, 2018	
The Longing	Studio Seufz	Application Systems Heidelberg	April 14, 2021	
Loop Hero	Four Quarters	Devolver Digital	December 9, 2021	
Loopers	Key	Prototype	June 2, 2022	
Lorelei and the Laser Eyes	Simogo	Annapurna Interactive	May 16, 2024	
Lost Castle	Hunter Studios	Hunter Studios	September 19, 2019	
The Lost Child	Kadokawa Shoten	NIS America	June 19, 2018	
The Lost Cube	Red Mount Media	JanduSoft	February 25, 2021	
Lost Ember	Mooneye Studios	Mooneye Studios	September 24, 2020	
Lost in Play	Happy Juice Games	Joystick Ventures	August 10, 2022	
Lost in Random	Zoink Games	Electronic Arts	September 10, 2021	
Lost Ruins	Tokyo RPG Factory	Square Enix	October 12, 2017	
Lost Sphear	Altari Games	DANGEN Entertainment	June 6, 2022	
Lost Words: Beyond the Page	Sketchbook Games	Modus Games	April 6, 2021	
Love	Fred Wood	Mokuzai Studio	February 14, 2019	
Love Letter from Thief X	Voltage	Voltage	July 9, 2020	
Lovecraft's Untold Stories	Forsaken Games	Forsaken Games	May 10, 2019	
LoveKami: Divinity Stage	MoeNovel	MoeNovel	November 26, 2020	
LoveR Kiss	Sweet One	Kadokawa Games	February 27, 2020	
LoverPretend	Idea Factory	Idea Factory	March 25, 2021	
Lovers in a Dangerous Spacetime	Asteroid Base	Asteroid Base	October 3, 2017	
Lucah: Born of a Dream	melessthanthree	Syndicate Atomic	July 3, 2019	
Lufia I & II: The Sinstrals Saga	Taito	JP: Taito; WW: Clear River Games	2027	
Luigi's Mansion 2 HD	Next Level Games	Nintendo	June 27, 2024	
Luigi's Mansion 3	Next Level Games	Nintendo	October 31, 2019	
Lumines Remastered	Resonair	Enhance Games	June 26, 2018	
Lumione	Glimmer Studio	Perfect World Games	October 13, 2021	
Lumo	Triple Eh?	Rising Star Games	November 16, 2017	
Lunar Remastered Collection	Game Arts	GungHo Online Entertainment	April 18, 2025	
Lunark	Canari Games	WayForward	March 30, 2023	
Lunch A Palooza	Seashell Studio	Seashell Studio	November 3, 2020	
Lust for Darkness	Movie Games Lunarium	SimFabric	July 12, 2019	
Machinarium	Amanita Design	Amanita Design	November 1, 2018	
Mad Father	Sen	Playism	November 5, 2020	
Mad Rat Dead	Nippon Ichi Software	JP: Nippon Ichi Software; WW: NIS America	October 29, 2020	
Made in Abyss: Binary Star Falling into Darkness	Spike Chunsoft	Spike Chunsoft	September 1, 2022	
The Mageseeker: A League of Legends Story	Digital Sun	Riot Forge	April 18, 2023	
Mages of Mystralia	Borealys Games	JP: H2 Interactive; WW: Borealys Games	January 29, 2019	
Magical Girl Witch Trials	Re,AER	Re,AER	July 9, 2026	
Magical High-School Girl	illuCallab	Sekai Games	June 7, 2018	
MagiCat	Kucing Rembes	Toge Productions	September 20, 2018	
Magic Scroll Tactics	Otori Denshi	Mediascape	October 25, 2018	
Maglam Lord	Felistella	JP: D3 Publisher; WW: PQube	March 18, 2021	
The Mahjong	D3 Publisher	D3 Publisher	June 21, 2018	
Mahōtsukai no Yoru	Type-Moon	Aniplex	December 8, 2022	
Maid of Sker	Wales Interactive	Wales Interactive	November 26, 2020	
The Making of Karateka	Digital Eclipse	Digital Eclipse	August 29, 2023	
Mana Spark	Behemutt, Kishimoto Studios	QubicGames	December 22, 2018	
Maneater	Tripwire Interactive, Blindside Interactive	Tripwire Interactive, Deep Silver	May 25, 2021	
Manifold Garden	William Chyr Studio	William Chyr Studio	August 18, 2020	
Mantis Burn Racing	VooFoo Studios	JP: Konami; WW: VooFoo Studios	November 23, 2017	
Maquette	Graceful Decay	Annapurna Interactive	May 25, 2023	
Märchen Forest: Mylne and the Forest Gift	PrimaryOrbit	Clouded Leopard Entertainment	January 28, 2021	
Maria the Witch	Naps Team	Naps Team	November 9, 2017	
Mario & Luigi: Brothership	Acquire	Nintendo	November 7, 2024	
Mario & Sonic at the Olympic Games Tokyo 2020	Sega	Sega	November 1, 2019	
Mario + Rabbids Kingdom Battle	Ubisoft Milan	JP: Nintendo; WW: Ubisoft	August 29, 2017	
Mario + Rabbids Sparks of Hope	Ubisoft Milan	JP: Nintendo; WW: Ubisoft	October 20, 2022	
Mario Golf: Super Rush	Camelot Software Planning	Nintendo	June 25, 2021	
Mario Kart 8 Deluxe	Nintendo EPD	Nintendo	April 28, 2017	
Mario Kart Live: Home Circuit	Velan Studios	Nintendo	October 16, 2020	
Mario Party Superstars	NDcube	Nintendo	October 29, 2021	
Mario Strikers: Battle League	Next Level Games	Nintendo	June 10, 2022	
Mario Tennis Aces	Camelot Software Planning	Nintendo	June 22, 2018	
Mario vs. Donkey Kong	Nintendo Software Technology	Nintendo	February 16, 2024	
Marisa and Alice's Trap Tower	Desunoya	Mediascape	October 4, 2019	
Mark of the Ninja	Klei Entertainment	Klei Entertainment	October 9, 2018	
Mars Horizon	Auroch Digital	The Irregular Corporation	November 17, 2020	
Marvel MaXimum Collection	Limited Run Games	Limited Run Games	March 27, 2026	
Marvel Ultimate Alliance 3: The Black Order	Team Ninja	Nintendo	July 19, 2019	
Marvel vs. Capcom Fighting Collection: Arcade Classics	Capcom	Capcom	September 12, 2024	
Marvel's Guardians of the Galaxy	Eidos-Montréal	Square Enix	October 26, 2021	
Mary Skelter 2	Compile Heart	Idea Factory	August 22, 2019	
Mary Skelter Finale	Compile Heart	Idea Factory	November 5, 2020	
Master Detective Archives: Rain Code	Too Kyo Games, Spike Chunsoft	Spike Chunsoft	June 30, 2023	
Mastho is Together	Kind Cat Games	EastAsiaSoft	November 17, 2021	
Matchpoint: Tennis Championships	Torus Games	Kalypso Media	October 20, 2022	
Matsurika no Kei -kEi- Tenmeiin Iden	Otomate	Idea Factory	TBA	
Max: The Curse of Brotherhood	Stage Clear Studios	Stage Clear Studios	December 21, 2017	
Mecho Wars: Desert Ashes	Arcade Distillery	Arcade Distillery	January 10, 2019	
Medabots Classics Plus: Kabuto Version	Imagineer	Imagineer	November 12, 2020	
Medabots Classics Plus: Kuwagata Version	Imagineer	Imagineer	November 12, 2020	
Mega Man 11	Capcom	Capcom	October 2, 2018	
Mega Man Battle Network Legacy Collection	Capcom	Capcom	April 14, 2023	
Mega Man Legacy Collection	Capcom	Capcom	May 22, 2018	
Mega Man Legacy Collection 2	Capcom	Capcom	May 22, 2018	
Mega Man Star Force Legacy Collection	Capcom	Capcom	March 27, 2026	
Mega Man X Legacy Collection	Capcom	Capcom	July 24, 2018	
Mega Man X Legacy Collection 2	Capcom	Capcom	July 24, 2018	
Mega Man Zero/ZX Legacy Collection	Capcom	Capcom	February 25, 2020	
Mega Mall Story	Kairosoft	Kairosoft	January 17, 2019	
Megadimension Neptunia VII	Idea Factory, Compile Heart	JP: Compile Heart; WW: Idea Factory International	March 19, 2020	
Megaquarium	Auroch Digital	JP: Chorus Worldwide; WW: Auroch Digital	October 18, 2019	
Megaton Musashi	Level-5	Level-5	November 11, 2021	
Megaton Rainfall	Pentadimensional Games	Pentadimensional Games	August 9, 2018	
Melty Blood: Twi-Lumina	French Bread	Delightworks	April 22, 2027	
Melty Blood: Type Lumina	French Bread	Delightworks	September 30, 2021	
Meiji Katsugeki Haikara Ryuuseigumi: Seibai Shimaseu, Yonaoshi Kagyou	Otomate	Idea Factory	September 24, 2020	
Membrane	Perfect Hat	Perfect Hat	February 22, 2018	
A Memoir Blue	Cloisters Interactive	Annapurna Interactive	March 24, 2022	
Memories Off Historia Vol. 1	Mages	Mages	March 25, 2021	
Memories Off Historia Vol. 2	Mages	Mages	March 25, 2021	
Memories Off: Innocent Fille	Mages	Mages	October 25, 2018	
The Men of Yoshiwara: Ohgiya	Dogenzaka Lab	D3 Publisher	March 8, 2018	
Menheraflesia: Flowering Abyss	Charon	Far East Studio	TBA	
Mercenaries Blaze: Dawn of the Twin Dragons	Rideon	Rideon	October 1, 2020	
Mercenaries Saga Chronicles	Circle Entertainment	Circle Entertainment	January 18, 2018	
Mercenary Kings: Reloaded	Tribute Games	Tribute Games	February 6, 2018	
Merchant of the Skies	Coldwild Games	AbsoDev	July 30, 2020	
The Messenger	Sabotage	Devolver Digital	August 30, 2018	
Metal Gear Solid: Master Collection	Konami	Konami	October 24, 2023	
Metal Max Xeno Reborn	24Frame, Cattle Call, Kadokawa Games	JP: Kadokawa Games; WW: PQube	September 10, 2020	
Metal Slug Tactics	Leikir Studio	Dotemu	November 5, 2024	
Metallic Child	Studio HG	Crest	September 16, 2021	
Metro 2033 Redux	4A Games	JP: Koch Media; WW: Deep Silver	February 28, 2020	
Metro: Last Light Redux	4A Games	JP: Koch Media; WW: Deep Silver	February 28, 2020	
Metroid Dread	MercurySteam, Nintendo EPD	Nintendo	October 8, 2021	
Metroid Prime 4: Beyond	Retro Studios	Nintendo	December 4, 2025	
Metroid Prime Remastered	Retro Studios	Nintendo	February 8, 2023	
Metropolis: Lux Obscura	Kthulu Solutions	Kthulu Solutions	April 4, 2018	
MicroMan	Glob Games Studio	Glob Games Studio	TBA	
Midnight Deluxe	Petite Games	Ratalaika Games	March 8, 2018	
The Midnight Sanctuary	Cavyhouse	Unites	September 6, 2018	
Mighty Goose	MP2 Games	Playism	June 5, 2021	
Mighty Gunvolt Burst	Inti Creates	Inti Creates	June 15, 2017	
Mighty Switch Force! Collection	WayForward	WayForward	July 25, 2019	
Miitopia	Nintendo EPD, Grezzo	Nintendo	May 21, 2021	
Milky Way Prince: The Vampire Star	Eyeguys	Fantastico Studio	June 21, 2022	
Mimpi Dreams	Dreadlocks Ltd	Dreadlocks	November 15, 2018	
Mina the Hollower	Yacht Club Games	Yacht Club Games	TBA	
Minecraft	4J Studios	JP: Microsoft; WW: Mojang	May 11, 2017	
Minecraft Dungeons	Mojang, Xbox Game Studios, Double Eleven	JP: Microsoft; WW: Mojang	May 26, 2020	
Minecraft Legends	Mojang, Blackbird Interactive	Xbox Game Studios	April 18, 2023	
Minecraft: Story Mode	Telltale Games	Telltale Games	August 22, 2017	
Minecraft: Story Mode - Season Two	Telltale Games	Telltale Games	November 6, 2018	
Mineko's Night Market	Meowza Games	Humble Bundle	September 26, 2023	
Mini Metro	Dinosaur Polo Club	Radical Games	August 30, 2018	
Mini Motor Racing X	The Binary Mill	Next Gen Reality	September 17, 2020	
Ministry of Broadcast	Ministry of Broadcast Studio	JP: Playism; WW: Hitcents	April 28, 2020	
Minit	JW, Kitty, Jukio, Dom	Devolver Digital	August 9, 2018	
Minit Fun Racer	JW, Kitty, Jukio, Dom	Devolver Digital	May 2, 2023	
Minoria	Bombservice	Dangen Entertainment	September 10, 2020	
MIO: Memories in Orbit	Douze Dixièmes	Focus Entertainment	January 20, 2026	
Miracle Snack Shop	Talesshop	CFK	December 2, 2021	
Mirror	SakuraGame	SakuraGame	December 19, 2019	
Missile Command: Recharged	Nickervision Studios	Atari	May 27, 2020	
Miss Kobayashi's Dragon Maid: Sakuretsu! Chorogon Breath	Kaminari Games	Bushiroad	March 24, 2022	
The Missing: J.J. Macfield and the Island of Memories	White Owls	Arc System Works	October 11, 2018	
Mistonia no Kibou: The Lost Delight	Otomate	Idea Factory	July 18, 2024	
Mistover	Krafton	Krafton	October 10, 2019	
Mix Dunk: King of Basketball	Otomate	Idea Factory	TBA	
MLB The Show 22	San Diego Studio	MLB Advanced Media	April 5, 2022	
MLB The Show 23	San Diego Studio	MLB Advanced Media	March 28, 2023	
MLB The Show 24	San Diego Studio	MLB Advanced Media	March 19, 2024	
MO: Astray	Archpray	Rayark	September 10, 2020	
Modern Combat 5: Blackout	Gameloft Bucharest	Gameloft	February 14, 2019	
Moero Chronicle Hyper	Compile Heart	Idea Factory	January 31, 2019	
Moero Crystal H	Compile Heart	JP: Idea Factory; WW: EastAsiaSoft	September 5, 2019	
Moeyo! Otome Doushi: Kayu Koigatari	Otomate	Idea Factory	September 26, 2024	
Mom Hid My Game!	Hap	Kemco	December 21, 2017	
Momodora: Reverie Under the Moonlight	Bombservice	Dangen Entertainment	January 10, 2019	
Momotaro Dentetsu: Showa, Heisei, Reiwa Mo Teiban!	Konami	Konami	November 19, 2020	
Momonga Pinball Adventures	Seaven Studio	Plug In Digital	October 18, 2018	
Monark	Lancarse	JP: FuRyu; WW: NIS America	October 14, 2021	
Monica and the Rabbit Guard	Mad Mimic	Mad Mimic	December 4, 2018	
Monkarufanta: The Hero and the Crystal Girl	Experience	Experience	September 18, 2025	
Monkey Barrels	Good-Feel	Good-Feel	November 7, 2019	
Monobot	DreamSmith Studio	AOE Plus	December 2, 2021	
Monomals	Picomy	Rogue Games	October 21, 2021	
Mononoke Chigiri	Otomate	Idea Factory	July 31, 2025	
Monopoly	Engine Software	Ubisoft	October 31, 2017	
Monopoly Madness	Engine Software	Ubisoft	December 9, 2021	
Monster Boy and the Cursed Kingdom	Game Atelier	FDG Entertainment	December 4, 2018	
Monster Energy Supercross: The Official Videogame	Milestone	Milestone	February 13, 2018	
Monster Girls and the Mysterious Adventure	Nekotokage	Regista	September 17, 2020	
Monster Harvest	Maple Powered Games	Merge Games	August 19, 2021	
Monster High: Skulltimate Secrets	Petoons Studio	Outright Games	October 29, 2024	
Monster Hunter Generations Ultimate	Capcom	Capcom	August 25, 2017	
Monster Hunter Rise	Capcom	Capcom	March 26, 2021	
Monster Hunter Stories 2: Wings of Ruin	Capcom	Capcom	July 9, 2021	
Monster Jam: Crush It!	Team6 Game Studios	GameMill Entertainment	October 31, 2017	
Monster Jam Steel Titans	Feld Entertainment	THQ Nordic	November 26, 2019	
Monster Jam Steel Titans 2	Feld Entertainment	THQ Nordic	March 2, 2021	
Monster Prom: XXL	Beautiful Glitch	Those Awesome Guys	May 21, 2020	
Monster Rancher	Koei Tecmo	Koei Tecmo	December 19, 2019	
Monster Rancher 2	Koei Tecmo	Koei Tecmo	September 17, 2020	
Monster Viator	Hit Point	Kemco	April 9, 2020	
Moon: Remix RPG Adventure	Onion Games	Onion Games	October 10, 2019	
Moon Hunters	Kitfox Games	Kitfox Games	October 26, 2017	
Moonlighter	Digital Sun Games	JP: Teyon; WW: 11 Bit Studios	November 5, 2018	
Moon Samurai	Nunchaku Games	Nunchaku Games	TBA	
Moorhuhn Jump and Run 'Traps and Treasure'	Young Fun Games	Higgs Games	December 23, 2021	
Moorhuhn Jump and Run 'Traps and Treasures 2'	Young Fun Games	Higgs Games	April 14, 2022	
Moorhuhn Kart 2	Young Fun Games	Higgs Games	April 1, 2021	
Moorhuhn Knights & Castles	Young Fun Games	Young Fun Games	January 8, 2018	
Moorhuhn Pirates - Crazy Chicken Pirates	Young Fun Studio	Higgs Games	December 26, 2022	
Moorhuhn Remake	Young Fun Studio	Higgs Games	June 21, 2018	
Moorhuhn Wanted	Young Fun Studio	Higgs Games	September 27, 2018	
Moorhuhn X - Crazy Chicken X	Young Fun Studio	Higgs Games	August 25, 2022	
Morbid: The Seven Acolytes	Still Running	Merge Games	December 3, 2020	
Morphies Law	Cosmoscope	Cosmoscope	August 20, 2018	
Mortal Kombat 1	NetherRealm Studios	Warner Bros. Games	September 19, 2023	
Mortal Kombat 11	NetherRealm Studios	Warner Bros. Interactive Entertainment	April 23, 2019	
The Mortuary Assistant	DarkStone Digital	DreadXP	April 20, 2023	
Mosa Lina	Stuffed Wombat	Accidently Awesome	May 28, 2025	
Mosaic	Krillbite Studio	Raw Fury	January 23, 2020	
Mother Russia Bleeds	Le Cartel Studio	Devolver Digital	November 15, 2018	
MotionRec	Handsum	Playism	April 2, 2026	
Moto Racer 4	Anuman	Microids	October 18, 2018	
MotoGP 18	Milestone	Milestone	June 28, 2018	
MotoGP 19	Milestone	Milestone	June 27, 2019	
MotoGP 20	Milestone	JP: Oizumi Amuzio; WW: Milestone	April 23, 2020	
Moujuutsukai to Ouji-sama: Flower & Snow	Design Factory	Idea Factory	May 30, 2019	
MouseCraft	Crunching Koalas	Crunching Koalas	February 27, 2020	
Moving Out	SMG Studio, DevM Games	Team17	April 28, 2020	
Moving Out 2	SMG Studio, DevM Games	Team17	August 15, 2023	
Mr. Driller Drill Land	Bandai Namco Entertainment	Bandai Namco Entertainment	June 25, 2020	
Mr. Run and Jump	Graphite Lab, Heavy Horse Games	Atari	July 25, 2023	
Mr. Saitou	Laura Shigihara	Laura Shigihara	March 23, 2023	
Mr. Shifty	Team Shifty	TinyBuild	April 13, 2017	
Mulaka	Lienzo	Lienzo	March 1, 2018	
The Mummy Demastered	WayForward	JP: Oizumi Amuzio; WW: WayForward	October 24, 2017	
Munchkin: Quacked Quest	Steve Jackson Games	Asmodee	November 19, 2019	
Murder by Numbers	Mediatonic	The Irregular Corporation	March 5, 2020	
Murder Detective: Jack the Ripper	Nippon Ichi Software	Nippon Ichi Software	April 25, 2019	
Murder Mystery Machine	Blazing Griffin	Microids	August 25, 2021	
Muse Dash	PeroPeroGames	X.D. Network	June 20, 2019	
Mushihimesama	Cave	Live Wire	June 16, 2021	
Mushroom Wars 2	Zillion Whales	Zillion Whales	July 5, 2018	
Musicus!	Overdrive	Entergram	March 24, 2022	
Musynx	PM Studios, Acttil	PM Studios	June 21, 2018	
Mutant Football League	Digital Dreams Entertainment	Digital Dreams Entertainment	October 30, 2018	
Mutant Mudds Collection	Atooi	Atooi	December 14, 2017	
Mutant Year Zero: Road to Eden	Bearded Ladies	Funcom	July 30, 2019	
Mutazione	Die Gute Fabrik	Akupara Games	May 26, 2021	
Muv-Luv: Project Mikhail	aNCHOR	aNCHOR	TBA	
MX vs. ATV All Out	Rainbow Studios	THQ Nordic	September 1, 2020	
MXGP 3	Milestone	Milestone	November 21, 2017	
My Butler	Dogenzaka Lab	D3 Publisher	June 18, 2020	
My Forged Wedding	Voltage	Voltage	September 17, 2020	
My Friend Pedro	DeadToast Entertainment	Devolver Digital	June 20, 2019	
My Girlfriend is a Mermaid!?	Cosen	Sekai Games	February 28, 2019	
My Hero: One's Justice	Byking	Bandai Namco Entertainment	August 23, 2018	
My Hero: One's Justice 2	Byking	Bandai Namco Entertainment	March 12, 2020	
My Hero Ultra Rumble	Byking	Bandai Namco Entertainment	September 28, 2023	
My Little Pony: A Maretime Bay Adventure	Melbot Studios	Outright Games	May 27, 2022	
My Little Pony: A Zephyr Heights Mystery	Drakhar Studio	Outright Games	May 17, 2024	
My Next Life as a Villainess: All Routes Lead to Doom! – Pirates that Stir the Waters	Idea Factory	Idea Factory	December 23, 2021	
My Riding Stables: Life with Horses	UIG Entertainment	Treva Entertainment	August 2, 2018	
My Secret Pets	Dogenzaka Lab	D3 Publisher	April 30, 2020	
My Singing Monsters Playground	Big Blue Bubble	Big Blue Bubble	November 9, 2021	
My Time at Portia	Pathea Games	Team17	April 16, 2019	
My Time at Sandrock	Pathea Games	PM Studios, Focus Entertainment	November 2, 2023	
My Universe: Cooking Star Restaurant	Old Skull Games	Microids	November 10, 2020	
My Universe: Fashion Boutique	Black Sheep Studio	Microids	October 27, 2020	
My Universe: Interior Designer	Magic Pockets	Microids	November 4, 2021	
My Universe: Pet Clinic Cats & Dogs	It Matters Games	Microids	December 3, 2020	
My Universe: Puppies and Kittens	It Matters Games	Microids	December 2, 2021	
My Universe: School Teacher	Magic Pockets	Microids	October 15, 2020	
My9Swallows: Topstars League	Otomate	Idea Factory	August 29, 2024	
The Mystery of Woolley Mountain	Huey Games	Huey Games	April 10, 2019	
N++	Metanet Software	Metanet Software	May 24, 2018	
Nairi: Tower of Shirin	Homebear Studios	Homebear Studios	November 29, 2018	
Namco Museum	Bandai Namco Studios	Bandai Namco Entertainment	July 28, 2017	
Namco Museum Arcade Pac	Bandai Namco Studios	Bandai Namco Entertainment	September 28, 2018	
Namcot Collection	Bandai Namco Entertainment	Bandai Namco Entertainment	June 18, 2020	
Narcos: Rise of the Cartels	Kuju Entertainment	Curve Digital	November 21, 2019	
Narita Boy	Studio Koba	Team17	March 30, 2021	
Naruto: Ultimate Ninja Storm	CyberConnect2	Bandai Namco Entertainment	April 26, 2018	
Naruto Shippuden: Ultimate Ninja Storm 2	CyberConnect2	Bandai Namco Entertainment	April 26, 2018	
Naruto Shippuden: Ultimate Ninja Storm 3	CyberConnect2	Bandai Namco Entertainment	April 26, 2018	
Naruto Shippuden: Ultimate Ninja Storm 4	CyberConnect2	Bandai Namco Entertainment	April 23, 2020	
NASCAR Heat Ultimate Edition+	704Games	Motorsport Games	November 19, 2021	
Natsuzora no Monologue: Another Memory	Otomate	Idea Factory	July 25, 2024	
Navinosuke: The Yo-Kai Buster	Kohachi Studio	Kohachi Studio	2026	
NBA 2K18	Visual Concepts	2K Sports	September 15, 2017	
NBA 2K19	Visual Concepts	2K Sports	September 7, 2018	
NBA 2K20	Visual Concepts	JP: Take-Two Interactive; WW: 2K Sports	September 6, 2019	
NBA 2K21	Visual Concepts	2K Sports	September 4, 2020	
NBA 2K22	Visual Concepts	2K Sports	September 10, 2021	
NBA 2K23	Visual Concepts	2K Sports	September 8, 2022	
NBA 2K24	Visual Concepts	2K Sports	September 8, 2023	
NBA 2K25	Visual Concepts	2K Sports	September 6, 2024	
NBA 2K26	Visual Concepts	2K Sports	September 5, 2025	
NBA Bounce	Unfinished Pixel	Outright Games	September 26, 2025	
NBA 2K Playgrounds 2	Saber Interactive	2K Sports	October 16, 2018	
NBA Playgrounds	Saber Interactive	Saber Interactive	May 9, 2017	
Necrobarista	Route 59	Route 59	August 11, 2021	
Need for Speed: Hot Pursuit Remastered	Criterion Games	Electronic Arts	November 13, 2020	
Needy Streamer Overload	WSS Playground, xemono	WSS Playground	October 27, 2022	
Nefarious	StarBlade	Digerati	September 13, 2018	
Neko Tomo: Smile Mashimashi	Bandai Namco	Bandai Namco	November 19, 2020	
NekoMiko	Qureate	Qureate	December 5, 2019	
Nekopara Vol. 1	Neko Works	Neko Works	July 4, 2018	
Nekopara Vol. 2	Neko Works	Neko Works	February 14, 2019	
Nekopara Vol. 3	Neko Works	Neko Works	June 27, 2019	
Nekopara Vol. 4	Neko Works	Neko Works	December 22, 2020	
Nelke & the Legendary Alchemists: Ateliers of the New World	Gust Co. Ltd.	Koei Tecmo	January 31, 2019	
Neo Atlas 1469	Artdink	Artdink	April 19, 2018	
Neo Cab	Chance Agency	Fellow Traveler	October 3, 2019	
Neo Geo Pocket Color Selection Vol. 1	SNK, Code Mystics	SNK	March 17, 2021	
Neo Geo Pocket Color Selection Vol. 2	SNK, Code Mystics	SNK	November 9, 2022	
Neon Abyss	Veewo Games	Team17	July 14, 2020	
Neon Chrome	10tons	10tons	October 12, 2017	
Neon City Riders	Mecha Studios	Bromio	March 12, 2020	
Neon White	Ben Esposito	Annapurna Interactive	June 16, 2022	
Neo: The World Ends with You	Square Enix	Square Enix	July 27, 2021	
Neonwall	Norain Games	JanduSoft	March 15, 2018	
Neptunia x Senran Kagura: Ninja Wars	Tamsoft	Compile Heart	March 17, 2022	
Nerf Legends	Fun Labs	GameMill Entertainment	November 12, 2021	
NeuroVoider	Flying Oak Games	Playdius Entertainment	September 7, 2017	
Neva	Nomada Studio	Devolver Digital	October 15, 2024	
Nevaeh	Alpheratz	CFK	September 17, 2020	
Neverending Nightmares	Infinitap Games	JP: Playism; WW: Infinitap Games	July 22, 2020	
Neverwinter Nights: Enhanced Edition	Beamdog	Skybound Games	December 3, 2019	
Never Stop Sneakin'	Humble Hearts	Humble Hearts	December 14, 2017	
Neverway	Coldblood Inc.	Coldblood Inc., Outersloth	2027	
New Frontier Days: Founding Pioneers	Arc System Works	Arc System Works	March 3, 2017	
New Pokémon Snap	Bandai Namco Studios	Nintendo	April 30, 2021	
New Super Lucky's Tale	Playful Studios	Playful Studios	November 8, 2019	
New Super Mario Bros. U Deluxe	Nintendo EPD	Nintendo	January 11, 2019	
Nexomon	Vewo Interactive	PQube	September 17, 2021	
Nexomon: Extinction	Vewo Interactive	PQube	August 28, 2020	
Next Up Hero	Digital Continue	Aspyr	August 16, 2018	
Nier: Automata The End of Yorha Edition	PlatinumGames	Square Enix	October 6, 2022	
Nickelodeon All-Star Brawl	Fair Play Labs, Ludosity	NA: GameMill Entertainment; EU: Maximum Games	October 5, 2021	
Nickelodeon All-Star Brawl 2	Fair Play Labs	NA: GameMill Entertainment; EU: Maximum Games	November 7, 2023	
Nickelodeon Kart Racers	Bamtang Games	NA: GameMill Entertainment; EU: Maximum Games	October 23, 2018	
Nickelodeon Kart Racers 2: Grand Prix	Bamtang Games	NA: GameMill Entertainment; EU: Maximum Games	October 6, 2020	
Nickelodeon Kart Racers 3: Slime Speedway	Bamtang Games	NA: GameMill Entertainment; EU: Maximum Games	October 7, 2022	
Nick Jr. Party Adventure	Melbot Studios	Outright Games	October 11, 2024	
Nidhogg 2	Messhof	Messhof	November 22, 2018	
Night Call	Monkey Moon, BlackMuffin Studio	Raw Fury	June 24, 2020	
Night in the Woods	Infinite Fall	Finji	February 1, 2018	
Night Lights	Grave Danger Games, Meridian4	Ratalaika Games	November 26, 2021	
Night Trap: 25th Anniversary Edition	Screaming Villains	Limited Run Games	August 24, 2018	
Nights of Azure 2: Bride of the New Moon	Koei Tecmo	Koei Tecmo	August 31, 2017	
Nihilumbra	BeautiFun Games	BeautiFun Games	May 3, 2018	
Nikoderiko: The Magical World	Vea Games	Knights Peak	October 15, 2024	
Nine Parchments	Frozenbyte	Frozenbyte	December 5, 2017	
Nine Witches: Family Disruption	Indiesruption	Blowfish Studios	December 4, 2020	
Ninja Box	Bandai Namco Studios	Bandai Namco Entertainment	September 26, 2019	
Ninja Gaiden: Master Collection	Team Ninja	Koei Tecmo	June 10, 2021	
Ninja Issen	Asteroid-J	CFK	February 20, 2025	
Ninja JaJaMaru Collection	Biccamera	City Connection	December 12, 2019	
The Ninja Saviors: Return of the Warriors	Taito	JP: Taito; WW: Inin Games	July 25, 2019	
Ninjala	GungHo Online Entertainment	GungHo Online Entertainment	June 24, 2020	
NinNinDays	Qureate	Qureate	March 12, 2020	
Nintendo Labo - Toy-Con 01: Variety Kit	Nintendo EPD	Nintendo	April 20, 2018	
Nintendo Labo - Toy-Con 02: Robot Kit	Nintendo EPD	Nintendo	April 20, 2018	
Nintendo Labo - Toy-Con 03: Vehicle Kit	Nintendo EPD	Nintendo	September 14, 2018	
Nintendo Labo - Toy-Con 04: VR Kit	Nintendo EPD	Nintendo	April 12, 2019	
Nintendo Switch Sports	Nintendo EPD	Nintendo	April 29, 2022	
Nintendo World Championships: NES Edition	Nintendo EPD	Nintendo	July 18, 2024	
Ni no Kuni: Wrath of the White Witch	Level-5	Bandai Namco Entertainment	September 20, 2019	
Ni no Kuni II: Revenant Kingdom – Prince's Edition	Level-5	Bandai Namco Entertainment	September 16, 2021	
Nippon Marathon	Onion Soup Interactive	Onion Soup Interactive	December 17, 2018	
No Case Should Remain Unsolved	Somi	Playism	September 19, 2024	
No Longer Home	Humble Grove Studios	Fellow Traveller	October 7, 2021	
No Man's Sky	Hello Games	Hello Games	October 7, 2022	
No More Heroes	Grasshopper Manufacture	Marvelous	October 28, 2020	
No More Heroes 2: Desperate Struggle	Grasshopper Manufacture	Marvelous	October 28, 2020	
No More Heroes III	Grasshopper Manufacture	Marvelous	August 27, 2021	
No Place For Bravery	Glitch Factory	Ysbryd Games	September 22, 2022	
No Straight Roads	Metronomik	JP: Game Source Entertainment; WW: Sold Out	August 25, 2020	
Nobody Saves the World	Drinkbox Studios	Drinkbox Studios	April 14, 2022	
Nobunaga's Ambition: Sphere of Influence	Koei Tecmo	Koei Tecmo	March 3, 2017	
Nobunaga's Ambition: Rebirth	Koei Tecmo	Koei Tecmo	July 21, 2022	
Nobunaga's Ambition: Taishi	Koei Tecmo	Koei Tecmo	November 30, 2017	
Noel The Mortal Fate	Kawano, Vaka Game Magazine	Playism, Vaka Game Magazine	February 10, 2022	
Nongunz: Doppelganger Edition	Brainwash Gang	Digerati	May 6, 2021	
A Normal Lost Phone	Accidental Queens	Seaven Studio	March 1, 2018	
Northgard	Shiro Games	Shiro Games	September 26, 2019	
Not a Hero	Roll7	Devolver Digital	August 2, 2018	
Not Tonight	PanicBarn	No More Robots	January 31, 2020	
Nova-111	Funktronic Labs	No Gravity Games	January 13, 2022	
Nowhere Prophet	Sharkbomb Studios	No More Robots	July 30, 2020	
Nuclear Throne	Vlambeer	Vlambeer	March 20, 2019	
Nurse Love Addiction	Kogado Studio	JP: Kogado Studio; WW: Degica	April 19, 2019	
Nurse Love Syndrome	Kogado Studio	JP: Kogado Studio; WW: Degica	April 19, 2019	
Obakeidoro!	Free Style	Free Style	August 1, 2019	
Observer	Bloober Team	JP: Circle Entertainment; WW: Aspyr	February 7, 2019	
Oceanhorn: Monster of Uncharted Seas	Cornfox & Bros.	FDG Entertainment	June 22, 2017	
Oceanhorn 2: Knights of the Lost Realm	Cornfox & Bros.	FDG Entertainment	October 28, 2020	
Octodad: Dadliest Catch	Young Horses Games	Young Horses Games	November 9, 2017	
Octogeddon	All Yes Good	All Yes Good	May 16, 2019	
Octopath Traveler	Square Enix	JP: Square Enix; WW: Nintendo	July 13, 2018	
Octopath Traveler II	Acquire, Square Enix	Square Enix	February 24, 2023	
Odallus: The Dark Call	JoyMasher	JP: EastAsiaSoft; WW: Digerati	February 8, 2019	
OddBallers	Game Swing, Ubisoft Mumbai	Ubisoft	January 26, 2023	
Oddworld: Munch's Oddysee	Oddworld Inhabitants	Oddworld Inhabitants	May 14, 2020	
Oddworld: New 'n' Tasty!	Oddworld Inhabitants	Oddworld Inhabitants	October 27, 2020	
Oddworld: Stranger's Wrath	Oddworld Inhabitants	Oddworld Inhabitants	January 23, 2020	
Off	Fangamer, Mortis Ghost	Fangamer	August 15, 2025	
Ogre Tale	Mages	Degica Games	July 11, 2024	
Ōkami	Clover Studio	Capcom	August 9, 2018	
OK K.O.! Let's Play Heroes	Capybara Games	Cartoon Network Games	November 2, 2018	
OkunoKa Madness	Caracal Games	Ignition Publishing	September 8, 2020	
Okuri Inu	Mebius	Shannon	July 12, 2018	
Old Man's Journey	Broken Rules	Broken Rules	February 20, 2018	
Old School Musical	La Moutarde	JP: Worker Bee; WW: Playdius	September 13, 2018	
Olija	Skeleton Crew Studio	Devolver Digital	January 28, 2021	
OlliOlli: Switch Stance	Roll7	Gambitious	February 14, 2019	
OlliOlli World	Roll7	Private Division	February 8, 2022	
Olympia Soirée: Catharsis	Otomate	Idea Factory	TBA	
Olympic Games Tokyo 2020 - The Official Video Game	Sega	Sega	July 24, 2019	
Omega Labyrinth Life	Matrix Software	D3 Publisher	August 1, 2019	
Omensight: Definitive Edition	Spearhead Games	Spearhead Games	December 13, 2018	
Omori	Omocat	Playism	June 17, 2022	
Once Upon a Katamari	Bandai Namco Entertainment	Bandai Namco Entertainment	October 24, 2025	
One Hand Clapping	Bad Dream Games	HandyGames	December 14, 2021	
One More Dungeon	Ratalaika Games	Ratalaika Games	December 14, 2017	
One Night Stand	Kinmoku	Ratalaika Games	October 4, 2019	
One Piece: Pirate Warriors 3 Deluxe Edition	Omega Force	Bandai Namco Entertainment	December 21, 2017	
One Piece: Pirate Warriors 4	Omega Force, Koei Tecmo	Bandai Namco Entertainment	March 26, 2020	
One Piece Odyssey Deluxe Edition	Arstech Guild	Bandai Namco Entertainment	July 25, 2024	
One Piece: Unlimited World Red Deluxe Edition	Ganbarion	Bandai Namco Entertainment	August 24, 2017	
OneShot: World Machine Edition	Future Cat	Dangen Entertainment	September 22, 2022	
One Step From Eden	Thomas Moon Kang	Humble Bundle Presents	March 26, 2020	
One Way Heroics Plus	Smoking Wolf	Playism	June 18, 2020	
Oniken: Unstoppable Edition	JoyMasher	JP: EastAsiaSoft; WW: Digerati	February 8, 2019	
Onimusha: Warlords Remaster	Capcom	Capcom	December 20, 2018	
Oninaki	Tokyo RPG Factory	Square Enix	August 22, 2019	
Onirike	Devilish Games	Badland Publishing	June 29, 2021	
On Your Tail	Memorable Games	The Powell Group	November 21, 2024	
Ooblets	Glumberland	Glumberland	September 1, 2022	
Operation Hardcore	Cosmocat	Greenlight Games	June 1, 2018	
OPUS: The Day We Found Earth	Sigono	Flyhigh Works	November 30, 2017	
OPUS: Prism Peak	Sigono	Flyhigh Works	April 16, 2026	
OPUS: Rocket of Whispers	Sigono	Flyhigh Works	March 22, 2018	
Orangeblood	Grayfax Software	Playism	October 1, 2020	
Orange Season	Innerfire Studios	Soedesco	October 24, 2024	
Order Land!	Poisoft	Poisoft	September 28, 2017	
Ori and the Blind Forest	Moon Studios	iam8bit	September 27, 2019	
Ori and the Will of the Wisps	Moon Studios	iam8bit	September 17, 2020	
The Origin: Blind Maid	Warani Studios	Badland Publishing	TBA	
Oshiri Tantei: Pupu Mirai no Meitantei Toujou!	Nippon Columbia	Nippon Columbia	November 4, 2021	
Osyaberi! Horijyo!	Clouds Play Company	Clouds Play Company	March 8, 2018	
Osyaberi! Horijyo! Gekihori: Anna Holinski Saves the Universe, Alright?!	Clouds Play Company	Clouds Play Company	September 21, 2023	
Othello	Arc System Works	Arc System Works	March 3, 2017	
Othercide	Lightbulb Crew	Focus Home Interactive	September 10, 2020	
The Otterman Empire	Tri-Heart Interactive	Tri-Heart Interactive	July 2, 2020	
Otxo	Lateralis Heavy Industries	Super Rare Originals	March 28, 2024	
Our Battle Has Just Begun! Episode 1	Vridge	Vridge	July 15, 2021	
Our World is Ended	Red Entertainment	PQube	February 28, 2019	
Out There: Ω The Alliance	Raw Fury	Raw Fury	April 9, 2019	
Outer Wilds	Mobius Digital	Annapurna Interactive	December 7, 2023	
The Outer Worlds	Obsidian Entertainment	Private Division	June 5, 2020	
Outlast	Red Barrels	Red Barrels	February 27, 2018	
Outlast 2	Red Barrels	Red Barrels	March 27, 2018	
Out of Line	Nerd Monkeys	JP: H2 Interactive; WW: Hatinh Interactive	July 7, 2021	
Over Requiemz	Otomate	Idea Factory	April 17, 2025	
Overcooked! 2	Ghost Town Games	Team17	August 7, 2018	
Overcooked! All You Can Eat	Ghost Town Games	Team17	March 23, 2021	
Overcooked! Special Edition	Ghost Town Games	Team17	July 27, 2017	
Overland	Finji	Finji	September 19, 2019	
Overlord: Escape from Nazarick	Engines	Kadokawa Games	June 16, 2022	
Override: Mech City Brawl	Modus Studios Brazil	JP: 3goo; WW: Modus Games	October 15, 2019	
Override 2: Super Mech League	Modus Studios Brazil	JP: Oizumi Amuzio; WW: Modus Games	December 22, 2020	
Overwatch	Blizzard Entertainment, Iron Galaxy	Blizzard Entertainment	October 15, 2019	
Overwatch 2	Blizzard Entertainment, Iron Galaxy	Blizzard Entertainment	August 10, 2023	
Owlboy	D-Pad Studio	D-Pad Studio	February 13, 2018	
Oxenfree	Night School Studio	Night School Studio	October 6, 2017	
Oxenfree II: Lost Signals	Night School Studio	Netflix	July 12, 2023	
Ozmafia Vivace	Poni-Pachet	Dramatic Create	August 27, 2020	
Pac-Man Championship Edition 2 Plus	Bandai Namco Studios	Bandai Namco Entertainment	February 22, 2018	
Pac-Man Mega Tunnel Battle: Chomp Champs	Amber Studio	Bandai Namco Entertainment	May 9, 2024	
Pac-Man Museum +	Bandai Namco Entertainment	Bandai Namco Entertainment	May 26, 2022	
Pac-Man World Re-Pac	Bandai Namco Entertainment	Bandai Namco Entertainment	August 26, 2022	
Pac-Man World 2 Re-Pac	Now Production	Bandai Namco Entertainment	September 26, 2025	
PAKO Caravan	Tree Men Games	Tree Men Games	March 2, 2021	
Paint the Town Red	South East Games	South East Games	July 29, 2021	
Paladins	Evil Mojo Games	Hi-Rez Studios	June 12, 2018	
The Pale Beyond	Bellular Studios	Fellow Traveller	February 24, 2023	
Paleo Pines	Italic Pig	Modus Games	September 26, 2023	
Palia	Singularity 6	Singularity 6	December 14, 2023	
Pang Adventures	Dotemu	Dotemu	January 3, 2019	
Pangeon	Skrypious	Ultimate Games, Gaming Factory	July 14, 2020	
Panorama Cotton	Success	JP: Sunsoft; WW: Inin Games	October 29, 2021	
Panty Party	Animu Game	Cosen	April 25, 2019	
Panzer Dragoon: Remake	MegaPixel Studios	Forever Entertainment	March 26, 2020	
Panzer Paladin	Tribute Games	Tribute Games	July 21, 2020	
Paper Mario: The Origami King	Intelligent Systems	Nintendo	July 17, 2020	
Paper Mario: The Thousand-Year Door	Intelligent Systems	Nintendo	May 23, 2024	
Paper Wars: Cannon Fodder Devastated	iFun4all	iFun4all	March 1, 2018	
Papetura	Petums	Feardemic	December 1, 2022	
Paradigm Paradox	Idea Factory	Idea Factory	May 27, 2021	
Paradise Killer	Kaizen Game Works	JP: Leoful; WW: Fellow Traveller	September 4, 2020	
Parfait Remake	Giga, Dai	Entergram	November 25, 2021	
The Park	Funcom	Funcom	October 22, 2019	
Parkasaurus	Washbear Studio	Washbear Studio	April 28, 2022	
Part Time UFO	HAL Laboratory	Nintendo	October 28, 2020	
Party Animals	Recreate Games	Recreate Games	TBA	
Party Golf	Giant Margarita	Giant Margarita	October 19, 2017	
Party Hard	Pinokl Games	TinyBuild	November 22, 2018	
Party Hard 2	Pinokl Games	TinyBuild	September 8, 2020	
Party Planet	Teyon	JP: Digital Bards; NA: Mastiff; EU: Teyon	December 12, 2017	
Pascal's Wager	TipsWorks	Giant Network, Yooreka Studio	July 14, 2022	
Passpartout 2: The Lost Artist	Flamebait Games	Happinet	October 19, 2023	
PATAPON 1+2 Replay	sAs Co., Ltd	Bandai Namco Entertainment	July 11, 2025	
Path of Mystery: A Brush with Death	Toybox Inc.	Imagineer	December 12, 2024	
The Pathless	Giant Squid	Annapurna Interactive	February 2, 2023	
Pato Box	Bromio	Bromio	July 9, 2018	
Paw Patrol: Grand Prix	3DClouds	Outright Games	September 30, 2022	
Paw Patrol: On a Roll	Torus Games	Outright Games	October 26, 2018	
Paw Patrol The Movie: Adventure City Calls	Drakhar Studio	Outright Games	August 13, 2021	
Payday 2	Overkill Software	Starbreeze Studios	February 23, 2018	
PBA Pro Bowling	FarSight Studios	FarSight Studios	October 22, 2019	
PBA Pro Bowling 2021	FarSight Studios	FarSight Studios	December 21, 2020	
PC Building Simulator	Irregular Corporation	Irregular Corporation	August 13, 2019	
Peaky Blinders: Mastermind	FuturLab	Curve Digital	August 20, 2020	
The Pedestrian	Skookum Arts	Skookum Arts	July 18, 2024	
Penguin Wars	City Connection	JP: City Connection; WW: Dispatch Games	September 21, 2017	
Penny-Punching Princess	Nippon Ichi Software	NIS America	March 30, 2018	
Pentiment	Obsidian Entertainment	Xbox Game Studios	February 22, 2024	
Peppa Pig: World Adventures	Petoons Studio	Outright Games	March 17, 2023	
Pepper Grinder	Ahr Ech	Devolver Digital	March 28, 2024	
Perception	Deep End Games	Deep End Games	October 31, 2017	
Perchang	Perchang Games	Perchang Games	June 4, 2019	
Perky Little Things	Ktulhu Solutions	Ktulhu Solutions	September 23, 2020	
Persona 3 Portable	Atlus	Sega	January 19, 2023	
Persona 4 Arena Ultimax	Arc System Works, P-Studio	Atlus	March 17, 2022	
Persona 4 Golden	Atlus	Sega	January 19, 2023	
Persona 5 Royal	P-Studio	Atlus	October 21, 2022	
Persona 5 Strikers	Omega Force, P-Studio	JP: Atlus; WW: Koei Tecmo	February 20, 2020	
Persona 5 Tactica	P-Studio	JP: Atlus; WW: Sega	November 17, 2023	
Petadachi	Atooi	Atooi	TBA	
Petal Crash	Friend & Fairy	GalaxyTrail	October 12, 2020	
PGA Tour 2K21	HB Studios	2K Sports	August 21, 2020	
Phantasy Star Online 2	Sega	Sega	April 4, 2018	
Phantasy Star Online 2: New Genesis	Sega	Sega	June 9, 2021	
Phantom Breaker: Battle Grounds Overdrive	Mages	Mages	December 7, 2017	
Phantom Breaker: Omnia	GameLoop, Mages	Rocket Panda Games	March 15, 2022	
Phantom Trigger	Bread Team	TinyBuild	August 10, 2017	
Phoenix Wright: Ace Attorney Trilogy	Capcom	Capcom	February 21, 2019	
Phoenotopia: Awakening	Cape Cosmic	Cape Cosmic	August 20, 2020	
Phogs!	Bit Loom Games	Coatsink	December 3, 2020	
Photon Cube	Smile Axe	Smile Axe	June 29, 2017	
Phrasefight	VeryOK	Mediascape	December 20, 2018	
Physical Contact: 2048	Collavier Corporation	Collavier Corporation	September 7, 2017	
PIANOFORTE	Regista	Regista	March 30, 2023	
Pico Park	TecoPark	TecoPark	June 8, 2019	
Pico Park 2	TecoPark	TecoPark	August 27, 2024	
Picross: Juufuutei Raden's Guide for Pixel Museum	Jupiter Corporation	Jupiter Corporation	June 4, 2025	
Picross -LogiartGrimoire-	Jupiter Corporation	Jupiter Corporation	April 18, 2024	
Picross Lord of the Nazarick	Jupiter Corporation	Jupiter Corporation	July 25, 2019	
Picross: Records of The Shield Hero	Jupiter Corporation	Jupiter Corporation	October 3, 2024	
Picross S	Jupiter Corporation	Jupiter Corporation	September 28, 2017	
Picross S2	Jupiter Corporation	Jupiter Corporation	August 2, 2018	
Picross S3	Jupiter Corporation	Jupiter Corporation	April 25, 2019	
Picross S4	Jupiter Corporation	Jupiter Corporation	April 23, 2020	
Picross S5	Jupiter Corporation	Jupiter Corporation	November 26, 2020	
Picross S6	Jupiter Corporation	Jupiter Corporation	April 22, 2021	
Picross S7	Jupiter Corporation	Jupiter Corporation	December 23, 2021	
Picross S8	Jupiter Corporation	Jupiter Corporation	September 29, 2022	
Picross S9	Jupiter Corporation	Jupiter Corporation	April 27, 2023	
Picross S+	Jupiter Corporation	Jupiter Corporation	February 29, 2024	
Picross S: Doraemon & F Characters Edition	Jupiter Corporation	Jupiter Corporation	March 27, 2025	
Picross S: Genesis & Master System Edition	Jupiter Corporation	Jupiter Corporation	August 5, 2021	
Picross S: Namco Legendary Edition	Jupiter Corporation	Jupiter Corporation	May 30, 2024	
Picross X: Picbits vs. Uzboross	Jupiter Corporation	Jupiter Corporation	August 4, 2022	
Pig Eat Ball	Mommy's Best Games	Mommy's Best Games	October 18, 2019	
Pika Pika Nurse Monogatari: Shounika wa Itsumo Oosawagi	Nippon Columbia	Nippon Columbia	April 2, 2020	
Pikmin 1	Nintendo	Nintendo	June 21, 2023	
Pikmin 2	Nintendo	Nintendo	June 21, 2023	
Pikmin 3 Deluxe	Nintendo EPD, Eighting	Nintendo	October 30, 2020	
Pikmin 4	Nintendo EPD, Eighting	Nintendo	July 21, 2023	
Pikuniku	Sectordub	Devolver Digital	January 24, 2019	
Pillars of Eternity	Obsidian Entertainment	Versus Evil	August 8, 2019	
The Pinball Arcade	FarSight Studios	FarSight Studios	May 10, 2018	
Pinball FX	Zen Studios	Zen Studios	July 6, 2023	
Pinball FX 3	Zen Studios	Zen Studios	December 12, 2017	
Pine	Twirlbound	Kongregate	November 26, 2019	
Pinstripe	Atmos Games	JP: Beep; WW: Serenity Forge	October 25, 2018	
Piofiore: Episodio 1926	Idea Factory	JP: Idea Factory; WW: Aksys Games	October 8, 2020	
Piofiore: Fated Memories	Design Factory	JP: Idea Factory; WW: Aksys Games	July 25, 2019	
Pirates 7	773	Mediascape	July 25, 2019	
Pix the Cat	Pasta Games	Pasta Games	August 8, 2019	
PixArk	Studio Wildcard	Studio Wildcard	May 31, 2019	
PixelJunk Eden 2	Q-Games	Q-Games	December 10, 2020	
PixelJunk Monsters 2	Q-Games	Spike Chunsoft	May 24, 2018	
Pizza Tower	Tour De Pizza	Tour De Pizza	August 27, 2024	
PJ Masks: Heroes of the Night	Petoons Studio	Outright Games	October 29, 2021	
Plague Inc: Evolved	Ndemic Creations	Ndemic Creations	August 2, 2019	
A Plague Tale: Innocence	Asobo Studio	Focus Home Interactive	July 6, 2021	
A Plague Tale: Requiem	Asobo Studio	Focus Home Interactive	October 18, 2022	
Planet of Lana	Wishfully Studios	Thunderful Publishing	April 16, 2024	
Plants vs. Zombies Replanted	PopCap Games	Electronic Arts	October 23, 2025	
Planetarian: The Reverie of a Little Planet	Key	Prototype	January 31, 2019	
Planescape: Torment: Enhanced Edition	Beamdog	Skybound Games	October 15, 2019	
Plants vs. Zombies: Battle for Neighborville - Complete Edition	PopCap Games	Electronic Arts	March 19, 2021	
Please Be Happy	Studio Elan	Sekai Games	February 21, 2025	
Please Fix the Road	Arielek	Silesia Games	May 16, 2024	
The Plucky Squire	All Possible Futures	Devolver Digital	September 17, 2024	
Plumbers Don't Wear Ties	United Pixtures	Limited Run Games	March 5, 2024	
Pocket League Story	Kairosoft	Kairosoft	May 16, 2019	
Pocket Rumble	Cardboard Robot Games	Chucklefish	July 5, 2018	
Pocky & Rocky Reshrined	Natsume Atari	JP: Natsume Atari; WW: Natsume Inc.	April 21, 2022	
Pode	Henchman & Goon	Henchman & Goon	June 21, 2018	
Poi: Explorer Edition	PolyKid	Alliance Digital Media	October 24, 2017	
Poisoft Thud Card	Poisoft	Poisoft	March 1, 2018	
Poison Control	Nippon Ichi Software	JP: Nippon Ichi Software; WW: NIS America	June 25, 2020	
Pokémon Champions	The Pokémon Works	The Pokémon Company, Nintendo	April 8, 2026	
Pokémon: Let's Go, Eevee!	Game Freak	The Pokémon Company, Nintendo	November 16, 2018	
Pokémon: Let's Go, Pikachu!	Game Freak	The Pokémon Company, Nintendo	November 16, 2018	
Pokémon Brilliant Diamond	ILCA	The Pokémon Company, Nintendo	November 19, 2021	
Pokémon Café Mix	Genius Sonority	The Pokémon Company, Nintendo	June 23, 2020	
Pokémon Legends: Arceus	Game Freak	The Pokémon Company, Nintendo	January 28, 2022	
Pokémon Legends: Z-A	Game Freak	The Pokémon Company, Nintendo	October 16, 2025	
Pokémon Mystery Dungeon: Rescue Team DX	Spike Chunsoft	The Pokémon Company, Nintendo	March 6, 2020	
Pokémon Quest	Game Freak	The Pokémon Company, Nintendo	May 29, 2018	
Pokémon Scarlet	Game Freak	The Pokémon Company, Nintendo	November 18, 2022	
Pokémon Shield	Game Freak	The Pokémon Company, Nintendo	November 15, 2019	
Pokémon Shining Pearl	ILCA	The Pokémon Company, Nintendo	November 19, 2021	
Pokémon Sword	Game Freak	The Pokémon Company, Nintendo	November 15, 2019	
Pokémon Unite	TiMi Studio Group	The Pokémon Company	July 21, 2021	
Pokémon Violet	Game Freak	The Pokémon Company, Nintendo	November 18, 2022	
Poker Night at the Inventory	Skunkape Games	Skunkape Games	March 5, 2026	
Pokkén Tournament DX	Bandai Namco Studios	The Pokémon Company, Nintendo	September 22, 2017	
Police Stories	Mighty Morgan	HypeTrain Digital	September 19, 2019	
Poly Bridge	Dry Cactus	Dry Cactus	December 14, 2017	
Pool Billiard	OhRussia	D3 Publisher	February 15, 2018	
Pool Panic	Rekim	Adult Swim Games	July 19, 2018	
Poppy Playtime: Chapter 1	Mob Entertainment	Mob Entertainment	December 25, 2023	
Port Royale 4	Gaming Minds	Kalypso Media	September 25, 2020	
Portal Companion Collection	Valve	Valve	June 28, 2022	
Portal Knights	Keen Games	505 Games	November 23, 2017	
Postal Redux	Running with Scissors	MD Games	October 16, 2020	
Potato Flowers in Full Bloom	Pon Pon Games	Playism	March 10, 2022	
Potion Craft	niceplay games	tinyBuild	December 12, 2023	
Potion Permit	MassHive Media	PQube	September 22, 2022	
Power Pro Kun Pocket R	Konami	Konami	November 25, 2021	
Power Rangers: Battle for the Grid	nWay Games	Lionsgate Games	March 26, 2019	
PowerWash Simulator	FuturLab	Square Enix Collective	January 31, 2023	
Pretty Princess Party	Nippon Columbia	JP: Nippon Columbia; WW: Aksys Games	December 5, 2019	
Prince of Persia: The Lost Crown	Ubisoft Montpellier	Ubisoft	January 18, 2024	
The Princess Guide	Nippon Ichi Software	JP: Nippon Ichi Software; WW: NIS America	March 8, 2018	
Princess Maker: Faery Tales Come True	CFK	CFK	December 19, 2019	
Princess Maker: Go! Go! Princess	CFK	CFK	December 12, 2019	
Princess Peach: Showtime!	Good-Feel	Nintendo	March 22, 2024	
Prinny: Can I Really Be the Hero?	NIS America	NIS America	October 13, 2020	
Prinny 2: Dawn of Operation Panties, Dood!	NIS America	NIS America	October 13, 2020	
PriPara: All Idol Perfect Stage!	Syn Sophia	Tomy	March 22, 2018	
Prison Architect	Introversion Software	Introversion Software	August 20, 2018	
Prison Princess	Qureate	Qureate	January 30, 2020	
Pro Baseball: Famista Evolution	Bandai Namco Studios	Bandai Namco Entertainment	August 2, 2018	
Pro Yakyuu Famista 2020	Bandai Namco	Bandai Namco	September 17, 2020	
The Procession to Calvary	Joe Richardson	Digerati	July 1, 2021	
Prodeus	Bounding Box Software	Humble Games	September 23, 2022	
Professional Farmer: American Dream	UIG Entertainment	UIG Entertainment	November 28, 2019	
Professor Rubik's Brain Fitness	Magic Pockets	Microids	November 12, 2020	
Project Code Kaleido Tower	Voltage	Voltage	2026	
Neon Clash -Echoes of the Lost-	Voltage	Voltage	December 25, 2025	
Project Highrise: Architect's Edition	Soma Sim	Kalypso Media	October 26, 2018	
Project Warlock	Buckshot Software	Crunching Koalas	June 11, 2020	
Project Winter	Other Ocean Interactive	Other Ocean Interactive	September 16, 2021	
Projection: First Light	Shadowplay Studios, Sweaty Chair Studio	Blowfish Studios	September 29, 2020	
ProtoCorgi	Kemono Games	Ravenscourt	June 15, 2023	
Psychic 5 Eternal	CRT Games	City Connection	July 27, 2023	
Puchitto Cluster	Ullucus Heaven	Ullucus Heaven	April 2, 2020	
Pumped BMX Pro	Yeah, Us!	Curve Digital	February 7, 2019	
Pumpkin Jack	Nicolas Meyssonnier	Headup Games	October 23, 2020	
Punch Club	Lazy Bear Games	TinyBuild	May 24, 2018	
Pui Pui Molcar Let's! Molcar Party!	Bandai Namco Studios	Bandai Namco Entertainment	December 16, 2021	
Pupperazzi	Sundae Month	Kitfox Games	April 6, 2023	
Pups & Purrs: Animal Hospital	Nippon Columbia	Aksys Games	July 2, 2020	
Pure Pool	VooFoo Studios	Ripstone	November 17, 2020	
Putty Pals	Harmonious Games	Harmonious Games	October 18, 2017	
Puyo Puyo Champions	Sonic Team	Sega	May 7, 2019	
Puyo Puyo Tetris	Sonic Team	Sega	March 3, 2017	
Puyo Puyo Tetris 2	Sonic Team	Sega	December 8, 2020	
Puzzle Adventure Blockle	Intense	Intense	August 3, 2017	
Puzzle & Dragons Gold	GungHo Online Entertainment	GungHo Online Entertainment	January 15, 2020	
Puzzle Puppers	Cardboard Keep	Cardboard Keep	February 20, 2018	
Puzzle Quest: The Legend Returns	Infinity Plus 2	D3 Publisher	September 19, 2019	
