= Nihilumbra =

2012 video game

- iOS app icon
- Developer: BeautiFun Games
- Publisher: BeautiFun Games
- Designer: Kevin Cerdà
- Programmers: Aniol Alcaraz; Pol Urós; Marcos Sueiro
- Artists: Freya Horn; Lourdes Nicolich
- Composer: Álvaro Lafuente
- Engine: Unity
- Platforms: iOS, Windows, macOS, Linux, Wii U, PS Vita, Android, Switch
- Release: iOS; June 27, 2012; Windows, macOS, Linux; September 25, 2013; PS Vita; January 27, 2015; Wii U May 14, 2015; Android; May 26, 2015; Switch; May 3, 2018
- Genre: Puzzle-platform
- Mode: Single-player

Nihilumbra is a 2012 puzzle-platform game developed by Spanish video game developer BeautiFun Games. The game was first released for iOS in June 2012, and it has been translated to seven languages.

== Gameplay ==
Nihilumbra (from the Latin words for "nothing" and "shadow") is played as a standard platform game, by controlling Born — a black anthropomorphic creature, born out of nothingness — as he walks and jumps across the game's levels. There are multiple environment dangers and enemy monsters that the player needs to avoid, since Born is initially unable to destroy them.

The game is divided into the five worlds that Born explores. In each of them, the player is granted a new colour, with which the player can paint on the terrain (by touching the screen) to modify the behaviour of the environment.

1. Frozen Cliffs – blue: makes surfaces slippery and faster to move on.
2. Living Forest – green: makes objects and monsters bounce off of surfaces.
3. Ash Desert – brown: makes surfaces sticky and slower to move on.
4. Volcano – red: makes objects and monsters burn upon contact.
5. The City – yellow: is able to conduct electricity between a variety of devices.

After successfully completing the game, a hard mode is unlocked, where Born explores the same worlds again, this time around equipped with the five colours (including red, so he's able to destroy most enemy monsters) and much more complex puzzles, that often require skillful use of all five colours.

== Reception ==
Since its release, Nihilumbra has received generally positive reviews, with an aggregate review score of 86 at Metacritic (based on 12 critics), of 85.71% at GameRankings (based on 7 reviews), and 8/10 at ComboCaster.

== Other versions ==
A Wii U version, that was first announced on the August 2013 Nintendo Direct Europe, was released on May 14, 2015. A Nintendo Switch version was released in May 2018 and available through the Nintendo Store.

A PC version was made available via Steam Greenlight. A remastered version of Nihilumbra was released on September 25, 2013 for Microsoft Windows, macOS and Linux, with updated graphics and soundtrack and voice acting for the narration. The soundtrack was released on Bandcamp on that same date, with Álvaro Lafuente credited as the composer and Furius Music with the remaster.

Nihilumbra was released as part of the PlayStation Plus January 2016 offering on the PlayStation Vita. While this version used the joypad and keys, it offered the touchscreen as alternative control methods.
