= Love (2008 video game) =

2008 video game

- Developer: Fred Wood
- Publishers: Fred Wood; Mokuzai Studio (Switch)
- Composer: James Bennett
- Engine: GameMaker: Studio
- Platforms: Windows, Switch
- Release: May 2008 (Love); February 7, 2014 (Love+ Early Access); February 14, 2014 (Love+); Nintendo Switch; February 14, 2019
- Genre: Platform
- Mode: Single-player

Love (stylized as LOVE) is a platformer developed and published by American indie developer Fred Wood. It was originally released in May 2008, exclusively to the game's website, but was later released as an enhanced version entitled Love+ on February 7, 2014 to Early Access, with its final release being on February 14, 2014. For the game's fifth anniversary, it was released on Nintendo Switch on February 14, 2019.

The game's art style is minimalistic; every level in the game has only three colors: black, white, and a custom third that varies each level, where white serves to indicate interactive objects, black serves as the background, and the third color makes the platforms. The game also carries a pixel art style.

On November 7, 2017, a sequel titled LOVE 2: kuso was released, which includes all sixteen main levels from Love+. A third entry in the series, LOVE 3, was released on December 7, 2021 and includes all levels from the previous games.

== Gameplay ==
The official gameplay trailer for Love+ on Steam

A comparison of the first level of Love and the first level of Love+

Love is a 2D platformer. The player character (known as fiveEight, as revealed in kuso) runs through several linear levels. They possess three abilities: jumping, moving left and right, and leaving a checkpoint behind at the push of a button. The player has 100 lives to play through 20 levels, in which the goal is to reach the end point in each to progress to the next.

Love+ nearly completely revamped the original game. It added three new game modes: "Easy Mode", which gives the player unlimited lives, "YOLO Mode", in which the player has only one life, and "Speedrun Mode", in which the goal is to finish the game in the shortest possible time. The original mode was renamed to "Arcade Mode". Many of the levels in the original game were scrapped, being replaced by completely new levels, and those that were carried over were heavily altered. Overall, Love+ has fewer levels in its main campaign than Love, with Love having twenty and Love+ having sixteen.

In updates, five more levels were added to Love+'s original line-up of eleven. Additionally, a fifth game mode titled "Remix Mode" was added in an update, which has the player play through seven "remixes" of levels from the main game, and later, in another update, a "bonus level" based on World 1-1 from Super Mario Bros. was added.

== Plot ==
fiveEight wakes up in a strange mechanical world, where everything they once knew has been replaced by machinery. They have no memory of what happened, except that things were much better before they woke up. They have nothing pushing them forward except a feeling in the back of their mind, telling them that there is a light at the end of the tunnel, with nothing but the hope of getting to something better.

== Development ==
Love was initially released to the website trunks.fireball20xl.com, first for a price of $1, but then for free. The game was later remade as Love+ and released to Steam under the title of LOVE. When creating custom levels, the game engine uses the bottom left pixel as the background color.

=== Music ===
The game's soundtrack was composed by James Bennett. The soundtrack has been described as "brilliant", and Bennett's compositional style has been said to be akin to "a 45-year old ice cream van making its way to the moon."

== Reception ==
Anthony Burch of Destructoid called the original game "charming", saying it was "straight platforming at its most inspired and difficult". Tim W. of Indiegames.com recommended the game for fans of "frustrating platformers".

Jonathan Kaharl of Hardcore Gaming 101 said that Love+ "demonstrates there is perfection to be found within simplicity". Tom Sykes praised it as being "all the retro platforming you need".
