= The Otterman Empire =

- Developer(s): Tri-Heart Interactive
- Publisher(s): Tri-Heart Interactive
- Engine: Unreal Engine 4
- Platform(s): Microsoft Windows; Nintendo Switch; Xbox One
- Release: July 2, 2020
- Genre(s): Third-person shooter
- Mode(s): Single-player; multiplayer

The Otterman Empire is a third-person shooter party video game developed and published by British indie studio Tri-Heart Interactive. The game was released for Microsoft Windows, Xbox One and Nintendo Switch on July 2, 2020.

== Gameplay ==
The Otterman Empire is a multiplayer third-person shooter party game. It has a single player and four-player couch-co-op campaign mode and players can battle against one another in a player verus player mode. Each player has several characters to choose from, each equipped with unique weapons. Players are able to unlock skins and customize their characters. Players fight across the galaxy of the Otterman Empire. When exploring each map, players can find a range of weapons and unique abilities to pick up and use.
