= Merchant of the Skies =

- Developer: Coldwild Games
- Publishers: Coldwild Games; AbsoDev
- Platforms: Linux; macOS; Windows; Nintendo Switch; Xbox One
- Release: Lin, Mac, Win; WW: April 17, 2020; Nintendo Switch, XOne; WW: July 30, 2020
- Genre: Simulation
- Mode: Single-player

Merchant of the Skies is a 2020 simulation video game developed by Coldwild Games, who published it along with AbsoDev. It blends elements of tycoon games and economic simulation.

== Gameplay ==
Players fly an airship through a fantastical steampunk world. On various floating islands, players harvest resources and refine them into more expensive ones. A journal helps players to keep track of recipes. As they make money, players can buy islands and invest in having the resources automatically harvested like tycoon games. Investing more money speeds up the process. When players have enough money, they can create a mansion on an island. Travel is done via an overworld. Travel is limited by electricity, which functions as fuel and can be recharged on various islands. If players run out of electricity, they can pay to have their airship towed. Running out of money twice ends the game. It uses pixel art graphics.

== Development ==
Coldwild Games is an independent game studio in Latvia. While Vladimir, a programmer, was busy finishing a console port, his wife, Helen, worked on art assets to stay busy and posted them on social media. The images attracted positive attention, and they decided to use them as concept art for a new game. Vladimir had previously considered a sky-faring game, but he had trouble coming up with the gameplay. He said having the concept art available helped him to do so. Merchant of the Skies entered early access on July 30, 2019. Coldwild Games and AbsoDev released it on April 17, 2020. AbsoDev released it for the Switch and Xbox One on July 30, 2020.

== Reception ==
Reception

Review scores
Publication	Score
Destructoid	7/10
Nintendo World Report	7.5/10

Rock Paper Shotgun reviewed Merchant of the Skies while it was in early access. They enjoyed the economic aspects and the art, though they suggested adding space pirates or another antagonist to make it a bit more involving. Nintendo World Report criticized the user interface on the Switch, but they enjoyed the sandbox gameplay and worldbuilding. Destructoid said that it is fun but lacks a memorable hook. GameStar praised the premise, balance between casual gameplay and hardcore economic simulator, and its ease of learning.
