= Puzzle Puppers =

2017 video game

- Developer: Cardboard Keep
- Publisher: Cardboard Keep
- Engine: Unity
- Platforms: Nintendo Switch; Windows; Android; iOS
- Release: Windows, iOS, Android: WW: January 20, 2017; Nintendo Switch: WW: February 20, 2018
- Genre: Puzzle
- Mode: Single-player

Puzzle Puppers is a puzzle game developed and published by Australian indie studio Cardboard Keep. Puzzle Puppers was released in January 2017 for mobile platforms and Microsoft Windows, and later released on the Nintendo Switch in February 2018. The game received mixed reviews from critics, who often appreciated the dog themes and core gameplay mechanics, but felt the game lacked in content and variety.

== Gameplay ==
Puzzle Puppers plays as a puzzle video game similar to the Snake style of video games. Gameplay involved stretching dogs around to find their food dishes without blocking each other. The hind section of each dog remains in a fixed location, while the player moves its head around and the body stretches to cover each tile the head passes over. Most levels involved multiple dogs, so a way must be found to get all of them to their food dishes in a way that does not block other dogs with their extended bodies. Holes that connect to one another and rivers to cross also exist in some levels. Levels also have hams for the player to collect to earn extra hearts and unlock extra optional levels. The game contains 80 levels in total.

== Development and release ==
The game was developed and published by Australian indie video game developer Cardboard Keep. The game was initially released in January 2017 on the Microsoft Windows, iOS, and Android platforms. It was later released on the Nintendo Switch in February 2018.

== Reception ==
Reception

Aggregate score
Aggregator	Score
Metacritic	(Switch) 65/100 (PC) tbd/100

Review scores
Publication	Score
Destructoid	6/10
Nintendo Life	7/10
Nintendo World Report	6.5/10

The game received mixed reception from critics. Destructoid and Nintendo Life both praised the overall cheerful dog-themed graphics and aesthetics, but criticized the lack of variety in the gameplay, feeling that the game needed more challenges and obstacles. Nintendo World Report similarly appreciated the dog theme, but felt that the game lacked in other presentation areas, namely that the entire game consisted of a single graphical environment and one single background song. The outlet was more positive about the challenge presented in the gameplay, but similarly felt that the game needed more variety and content. Multiple outlets conceded that the lack of content was more understandable considering the game's cheap five dollar price.
