= New Frontier Days: Founding Pioneers =

2017 video game

- Developer: Arc System Works
- Publisher: Arc System Works
- Platforms: Microsoft Windows; Nintendo Switch
- Release: March 3, 2017
- Genre: Simulation

New Frontier Days: Founding Pioneers (Note: Known in Japan as New Great Pioneering Era ～Building a Town～ (Japanese: 新大開拓時代 ～街をつくろう～, Hepburn: Shin'ō kaitaku jidai ~ machi'o tsukurou ~)) is a farming simulation video game developed and published by Arc System Works, and is a sequel to the 2015 Nintendo 3DS eShop title Frontier Days: Founding Pioneers. It was released in Japan on March 3, 2017 and in North America on March 27, 2017 for the Nintendo Switch and on June 7, 2017 for the Microsoft Windows. It received mixed or average reviews according to Metacritic.

== Reception ==
According to review aggregator Metacritic, the game received a score of 52 out of 100 from 10 reviewers indicating "mixed or average reviews". In his positive review, Nintendo Life's Morgan Sleeper praised the game's "cheery" atmosphere, "intuitive" controls, and "bright" music. Although he criticized the opening as "slow", he found that once the game gets going it could be "seriously addictive". Sleeper noted, however, that the game's "lack of variety and an unambitious presentation" were drawbacks and that might keep it from being a "long term investment" for many. Sleeper ultimately gave the game a 7/10.

Writing for Nintendo World Report, J.P. Corban stated gave the game a positive review stating that while he enjoyed the depth of the gameplay it could become hectic at times due to the restrictions put upon the player by the timer. He concluded that this game would be valuable for fans of the genre, saying that it was "rewarding" to watch your settlement "grow and thrive".
