= Lovecraft's Untold Stories =

2019 video game

- Developer: Blini Games
- Publishers: Fulqrum Publishing; BadLand Publishing; Blini Games
- Platforms: macOS; Windows; Nintendo Switch; PlayStation 4; Xbox One; iOS; Android
- Release: Mac, Win; WW: January 31, 2019; Xbox, Switch, PS4; WW: May 10, 2019; iOS; WW: June 3, 2019; Android; WW: October 4, 2019
- Genre: Action role-playing
- Mode: Single-player

Lovecraft's Untold Stories is a 2019 action role-playing video game developed by Blini Games and first published by Fulqrum Publishing.

== Gameplay ==
Players control one of five protagonists, each of whom has different strengths, and fight against Lovecraftian enemies, including cultists, Mi-Go, and the monstrous penguins featured from At the Mountains of Madness. Players must investigate the Cthulhu Mythos while fighting off these threats. Encountering elements of the Mythos cause characters to lose sanity, but sanity can be recovered by consumable items. Lovecraft's Untold Stories blends elements of role-playing, adventure, shooter, and roguelite games. The levels are procedurally generated.

== Development ==
Lovecraft's Untold Stories entered early access in mid-2018. Fulqrum Publishing published Lovecraft's Untold Stories for Windows and macOS on January 31, 2019. BadLand Publishing published it for Switch, PlayStation 4, and Xbox One on May 10, 2019. Blini Games themselves published it on iOS and Android on May 3 and October 4, respectively.

A sequel, Lovecraft's Untold Tales 2, entered early access in October 2021 and was released in September 2022.

== Reception ==
On Metacritic, Lovecraft's Untold Stories received positive reviews for Windows and mixed reviews for Xbox One. TouchArcade compared it to Wayward Souls, one of the reviewer's favorite games, and praised its gameplay and replayability. Pocket Gamer called it "absolutely stunning" and praised the gameplay for including more than simple action mechanics. They included it in their roundup of the best action games for Android devices.
