= Collavier Corporation =

Japanese video game development and publishing company

- Type: Private
- Industry: Video games Software
- Founded: 25 December 2008
- Headquarters: Ueno Tokyo, Japan
- Key people: Yoshinori Satake (Director)
- Products: Comic Workshop 2 Comic Workshop; Painting Workshop; Amida's Path; Magical Diary: Secrets Sharing
- Website: http://collavier.com/en/

Collavier Corporation (株式会社コラビエ, Kabushikigaisha korabie) is a Japanese video game developer and publisher, based in Kita-Ueno, Taito-ku, Tokyo, Japan.

== History ==
Founded in 2008 by Yoshinori Satake, the lead game designer of Steel Empire and Over Horizon developed by Hot B. Originally releasing games exclusively in Japan, in 2014 Collavier Corp. started to release games and software in the North American and European markets. The company acquired the intellectual properties of Ertain after its shutdown.

== Games & software released in North America ==
=== Nintendo 3DS (Nintendo eShop) ===
- Comic Workshop 2 (2015/06/18)
- Monster Combine TD (2015/03/12)
- Painting Workshop (2015/01/08)
- Comic Workshop (2014/07/17)

=== Nintendo DSi/Nintendo 3DS (DSiWare) ===
- Magical Diary: Secrets Sharing (2014/10/23)
- Amida's Path (2014/08/14)
- My Aquarium: Seven Oceans (2014/07/19)
- Deep Sea Creatures (2014/05/15)

'Mysterious Stars series'

- Mysterious Stars: The Samurai (2014/07/26)
- Mysterious Stars: The Singer (2014/07/19)
- Mysterious Stars: A Fairy Tale (2014/04/11)

== Games & software released in Europe ==
=== Nintendo 3DS (Nintendo eShop) ===
- Comic Workshop 2 (2015/06/18)
- Monster Combine TD (2015/01/15)
- Painting Workshop (2014/10/09)
- Comic Workshop (2014/09/11)

=== Nintendo DSi/Nintendo 3DS (DSiWare) ===
- My Aquarium: Seven Oceans (2014/12/18)

== Games & software released in Japan ==
=== Nintendo 3DS (Nintendo eShop) ===
- Comic Workshop 2 / コミック工房2 (2015/02/25)
- Monster Combine TD / カスタムモンスターズ (2014/09/03)
- Comic Workshop / コミック工房 (2014/01/15)
- Painting Workshop / もっと気軽に！お絵描き工房プラス (2013/08/21)

=== Nintendo DSi/Nintendo 3DS (DS iWare) ===
- Magical Diary: Secrets Sharing / ともだち作ろう！魔法のこうかん日記 (2013/07/03)
- Deep Sea Creatures / ディープアクアリウム (2013/12/04)
- My Aquarium: Seven Oceans / 極・美麗アクアリウム～世界の魚とイルカ・クジラ達～ (2013/06/12)
- タッチで漫才！メガミの笑壺DL (2013/05/01)
- Amida's Path / 阿・弥・陀 (2012/11/14)
- お絵描き工房 (2011)

'Mysterious Stars series / 不思議な点つなぎ'

- Mysterious Stars: The Singer / 不思議な点つなぎ 昭和・四畳半物語編 (2012/5/9)
- Mysterious Stars: The Samurai / 不思議な点つなぎ 江戸・立身出世編 (2012/4/25)
- Mysterious Stars: A Fairy Tale / 不思議な点つなぎ 中世・メルヘン編 (2012/4/11)

'Coloring Book series / みんなの塗り絵'

- Little Twin Stars' Coloring Book / Little Twin Starsとみんなの塗り絵 (2011/12/21)
- My Melody's Coloring Book / マイメロディとみんなの塗り絵 (2011/12/28)
- Hello kitty's Coloring Book / ハローキティのみんなの塗り絵 (2011/07/20)

== In development (Japan) ==
- エプト王と1001人の后 (iPad)
