= Party Golf =

2016 video game

- Nintendo Switch digital artwork
- Developer: Giant Margarita
- Publisher: Giant Margarita
- Engine: Unity
- Platforms: Microsoft Windows, Nintendo Switch, PlayStation 4, Ouya, Xbox One
- Release: PlayStation 4: EU: October 4, 2016; NA: October 26, 2016; Microsoft Windows: WW: October 26, 2016; Nintendo Switch: WW: October 19, 2017; Ouya: WW: October 2015; Xbox One: WW: 25 May 2019
- Genres: Party Game, Sports Game
- Modes: Single-player, multiplayer

Party Golf is a realtime, multiplayer golf game, developed by Australian game developer Giant Margarita. The game is a multiplayer twist on the popular golf video game genre. The aim is for players to race to the hole, and attempt to be first to sink their ball. The core rules of the game can be customized to allow a variety of different factors to influence winning. The game features a large amount of customization, including support for up to 8-person multiplayer. The game launched for the PlayStation 4 in the PSN EU region on October 4, 2016. A North American PlayStation 4 regional launch occurred on October 26, 2016, with a simultaneous release on Steam. The game launched for the Nintendo Switch worldwide on October 19, 2017, and this version can support up to eight players with individual Joy-Con controllers.
