= Nairi: Tower of Shirin =

2018 video game by HomeBearStudio

NAIRI: Tower of Shirin
- Developer: HomeBearStudio
- Publisher: Hound Picked Games
- Artist: You Miichi
- Writer: Josh van Kuilenburg
- Engine: Unity
- Platforms: Microsoft Windows, Nintendo Switch
- Release: November 29, 2018
- Genres: Point-and-click adventure, visual novel
- Mode: Single-player

NAIRI: Tower of Shirin is a point-and-click adventure game and visual novel, developed by the Dutch indie game developer HomeBearStudio and published by Hound Picked Games. The game was released on November 29, 2018 for the Windows and Nintendo Switch platforms.

A sequel, NAIRI: Rising Tide, will be released on November 14, 2024 for the Windows and Nintendo Switch platforms.

== Gameplay ==
The player takes the role of the protagonist, Nairi. While the story of the game is primarily told in visual novel format, the player is required to navigate through various locations and solve puzzles and combine objects to advance. At certain points, the player can communicate with other characters and receive more background information about the world and plot. The player can find hidden coins in almost every scene; these coins can be used to unlock concept art of the game.

== Plot ==
Nairi is a human girl living in the rich district of Shirin. When her tutor, a talking Raccoon, tells her that she has to leave the house and not return she flees and ends up in being smuggled out of the district. Later on, she investigates the lower districts of Shirin and the Tower that a friend, Rex, has been learning about. Soon, Nairi discovers a magical ancient world and that she has a bigger role than she anticipated.

== Development ==
The game was financed by 278 backers through a Kickstarter campaign in October 2016. The goal of the campaign was to raise a total of 7,500 €; this goal was surpassed with a total of 8,253 €. The game was written, designed, and programmed by Josh van Kuilenburg, while the art, animation, and Japanese localization was done by You Miichi. Antonio Garcia was responsible for the dialogue content editing as well as the Spanish localization. Furthermore, the game was localized into German, French, Italian and Chinese. The art style was inspired by Studio Ghibli as well as Disney and Pixar.

== Reception ==
The Switch version received mixed reviews on Metacritic. NintendoWorldReport praised the art, dialogue, and puzzles, but they criticized what they felt to be confusing navigation and would have preferred an in-game hint system. Nintendo Life called it a "hidden gem" and praised the quirky characters and challenging puzzles. Adventure Gamers wrote that it has adorable characters, beautiful art, and balanced puzzles, but they felt the game ended abruptly.

== Sequel ==
On November 14, 2024, a sequel titled NAIRI: Rising Tide was released for PC and Nintendo Switch.
