= Metropolis: Lux Obscura =

2017 video game

- Developer: Ktulhu Solutions
- Publisher: Ktulhu Solutions/Sometimes You
- Producer: Ivan Lytkin
- Artist: Oleg Okunev
- Composer: Vadim Krakhmal
- Platforms: Nintendo Switch, PC, PlayStation 4, PlayStation Vita, Xbox One
- Release: PC: WW: October 11, 2017; Console: WW: April 4, 2018
- Genres: Adventure, match-three

Metropolis: Lux Obscura is a 2017 noir-themed adventure-puzzle video game developed by Ktulhu Solutions. It follows a story-based narrative that is inspired by Sin City. The game was released first on Steam followed by Nintendo eShop, PlayStation Store and Xbox in 2018.

== Synopsis and gameplay ==
Gameplay screenshot showing a part where the player chooses from multiple options

Metropolis: Lux Obscura follows the story of player-character Jon Lockhart, who is released following imprisonment, framed for the murder of a friend. He sets out to prove that he is not a criminal by performing violent acts against bad people. The game has a comic art style driven storyline with voice acting and there are a total of four different endings. Battles in the game take place in the form of match-three puzzles. The game also contains graphical sex scenes and nudity.

== Development and release ==
Metropolis: Lux Obscura was developed by indie developer Ktulhu. The comic artwork was done by Oleg Okunev. A spin-off during development became the inspiration for Perky Little Things. After its PC release, it was ported by Sometimes You to other platforms released in April 2018. A limited edition physical copy for PlayStation 4 was also released as well as a soundtrack on cassette tape. A comic book was released as a free DLC in 2019.

== Controversy ==
Players of the game on Xbox One reported that they had been banned from Xbox Live after making screenshots or video clips of the game, with the stated reasoning being "pornographic content". On April 7, 2018, there were reports that affected users were being unbanned.

== Reception ==
The game received a "generally unfavorable" score of 49/100 on aggregate website Metacritic. Zachary Miller of Nintendo World Report, with a score of 7/10, gave praise to art, voice acting and music, but doubted that the fight sections were "fun" and wrote that the sex scenes were "a little much". Digitally Downloaded, giving 1.5/5, wrote: "Even if you don't care about the poor storytelling and juvenile understanding of the noir genre, Metropolis is still a supremely bland and uninteresting match-3 game".
