= Panty Party =

2017 video game

- Developer: Animu Game
- Publisher: Cosen
- Platforms: Nintendo Switch, Windows, PlayStation 5
- Release: PC: WW: January 24, 2017; Nintendo Switch: WW: April 25, 2019; PlayStation 5: WW: February 12, 2026
- Genre: Action
- Mode: Single-player

Panty Party (Japanese: パンティパーティー) is a 2017 action video game for Windows and later ported to Nintendo Switch and PlayStation 5.

== Gameplay ==
Panty Party is an action game with hack-and-slash features. The player plays as Yurika, a schoolgirl and the "Warrior of Love" who transforms into a pair of underpants and fights against other panties in arena-style battles.

== Development and release ==
Panty Party was developed by Taiwanese indie studio Animu Game and published by Tokyo-based Cosen Co, Ltd. It has voice acting in Japanese performed by Kissyo Haru, Hanegi Riru, Kokko, Katagiri Ryoichi, and Imai Fumiya; the game itself includes languages English, French, German, Spanish, Portuguese, Dutch, Russian, Norwegian, Finnish, Turkish, Ukrainian, Traditional Chinese, Simplified Chinese, Korean, and Japanese.

On April 25, 2019, Panty Party was released on the Nintendo eShop for Nintendo Switch. Both the game's Steam and eShop listing descriptions have a warning that the game does not contain any hentai content. Eastasiasoft also released a physical Nintendo Switch limited edition through Play-Asia with additional items including a soundtrack CD and Panty Party branded underpants. The game was later released on PlayStation 5 as Panty Party Perfect on February 12, 2026.

== Reception ==
Reception

Aggregate score
Aggregator	Score
Metacritic	48/100 (NS)

Review score
Publication	Score
Famitsu	26/40

Following its release, Panty Party received overwhelming positivity on Steam and was one of the highest user rated games on the platform. The game received "generally unfavorable" reviews according to the aggregator Metacritic (on Nintendo Switch) with a score of 48.
