= I and Me =

2017 video game

- Developer: Wish Fang
- Publisher: Ratalaika Games
- Platforms: Nintendo Switch; Windows
- Release: WW: July 6, 2017; NA: July 13, 2017
- Genre: Puzzle-platform
- Mode: Single-player

I and Me is a puzzle-platform game developed by Chinese studio Wish Fang and published by Ratalaika Games. It was released on the Nintendo Switch in the Japan and PAL regions on July 6, 2017 and in the North American region on July 13, 2017. The game has received mixed reviews.

== Reception ==
Review aggregator Metacritic assigned a score of 60/100 to I and Me, indicating "Mixed or average reviews". In his review for Nintendo Life, Morgan Sleeper called the level design "clever" and mentioning that each level feels like "one big puzzle" rather than a "series of tricky sequences" which made for a "nice snappy pace". Positive remarks were also given to the game's art style with Sleeper remarking that the game was "beautiful" and positively compared it to a film by Studio Ghibli. He ultimately gave the game 8/10 stars.

Reviewing the game for Pocket Gamer, Emily Sowden gave the game a 6/10, saying that she found the short length of the levels "wonderful" and mentioned that the soundtrack, while relaxing, didn't distract too much from the game which she found to be "ideal" for a platformer. Negative comments were directed towards the "sheer repetition" of the game, which Sowden lamented made for a game that provided "little challenge".
