= Juicy Realm =

2018 video game

- Developer: SpaceCan Games
- Publishers: X.D. Network; PM Studios
- Producer: Tyreal Han
- Designer: Tyreal Han
- Programmer: Tyreal Han
- Artist: biboX
- Composer: biboX
- Engine: Unity
- Platforms: Windows; macOS; PlayStation 4; PlayStation 5; Switch; iOS; Android
- Release: Windows, macOS: WW: May 3, 2018; Switch: WW: November 7, 2019; iOS, Android: WW: May 4, 2020; PS4, PS5: WW: March 5, 2024
- Genres: Roguelike, twin-stick shooter
- Modes: Single-player, multiplayer

Juicy Realm is a roguelike, twin-stick shooter game developed by SpaceCan Games and published by X.D. Network and PM Studio. It was released for Microsoft Windows and macOS on May 3, 2018. A Nintendo Switch version was released on November 7, 2019. Versions for iOS and Android were released on May 4, 2020. On March 5, 2024, the game was released for the PlayStation 4 and PlayStation 5.

== Gameplay ==
Juicy Realm is a roguelike, twin-stick shooter with four playable characters, each with their own weapons and gear. The characters explore the fruits' empire through several maps with procedurally-generated zones, monsters, and items, ending with a boss. Players will face off against all sorts of fruits and collect weapons and gear. The player can also expand their camp base as they progress. The game can be played alone or with another player.

== Development and release ==
Juicy Realm was in development for a year by a two-man team at Chinese studio SpaceCan Games. The studio consists of app developer Tyreal Han and comic artist biboX, both long-time gamers. BiboX is responsible for the artwork and music. Juicy Realm is SpaceCan Games's first game for PC and consoles.

The game was first released for Windows and macOS via Steam by X.D. Network on May 3, 2018. It later launched digitally for the Nintendo Switch on November 7, 2019, also published by X.D. Network. Versions for iOS and Android were released on May 4, 2020. On March 5, 2024, PM Studios released the game digitally for the PlayStation 4 and PlayStation 5. A physical edition for the PlayStation 5 and Nintendo Switch followed on May 21, 2024, also published by PM Studios.

== Reception ==
Prior to the game's release, it was nominated by indiePlay for the Best Game Grand Prize, but won for the Excellence in Visual Art from the same game trade show. Other awards are from the GDC's Indie Mega Booth and Bitsummit Vol. 6.
