= Story of Eroolia =

Video game series

- Genres: Otome game, visual novel
- Developer: Roseverte
- Publisher: Roseverte
- Creator: Chu-3
- Artists: Bakufu Narayama, Ferry Susanto, Chu-3
- Writer: Chu-3
- Platforms: Microsoft Windows; Mac OS; Android iOS; PlayStation 4 Xbox One; Nintendo Switch
- First release: How To Take Off Your Mask; June 19, 2015
- Latest release: How To Sing To Open Your Heart; January 17, 2019

Story of Eroolia (エルーリア物語, Erūria monogatari) is an otome visual novel video game series developed and released by Roseverte for Microsoft Windows, Mac OS, iOS and Android. The series currently consists of three games; How To Take Off Your Mask (貴方の仮面の外し方, Anata no Kamen no Hazushikata), How To Fool A Liar King (嘘つきな王様の騙し方, Usotsukina ōsama no damashi-kata), and How To Sing To Open Your Heart (心を開くたい方, Kokoro o hirakutai kata).

== Gameplay ==
As it is a visual novel series, the player reads through the story and makes choices at crucial points to change the outcome, leading to different endings. The games are divided into several chapters and depending on the choices, the player will follow a different route. In each game, the player takes control of a different female protagonist and can fall in love with one of the male love interests.

== Plot ==
Story of Eroolia is a compilation of stories about humans and cat people who inhabit the island of Eroolia, an isolated land from the outside world. Eroolia and Laarz are the two countries located within the island of Eroolia. The mysterious island with unstable weather is inhabited by the cat people named "luccretia". The two countries are on bad terms, as Eroolia, which is mostly occupied by humans, does not get along with Laarz, which is known as the country of the luccretias.

== Development ==
The games were created with Lemonovel AIR. The story was written by Chu-3 while the art was done by Bakufu Narayama and Chu-3. Every game features a theme song and is fully voiced in Japanese. The first game was originally released in Japanese and English. It was later translated into German, Polish, Russian, and Spanish. The first part of the series was released as a remastered version in February 2021 for PlayStation 4, Xbox One and Nintendo Switch. The game was ported by Ratalaika Games and is the first of Roseverte to be released for consoles.

=== Voice actors ===
Character	Game		
Character	How to Take Off Your Mask (2015)	How to Take Fool A Liar King (2017)	How to Sing To Open Your Heart (2019)
Lilia/ Leea	Eruru Takeda	Eruru Takeda	Eruru Takeda
Ronan	Mato Sarashina	Mato Sarashina	Mato Sarashina
Juli	Kon	Kon	Kon
Mars	Taichi Tanukida	Taichi Tanukida	Taichi Tanukida
Grandma	Hisano Numahata	Hisano Numahata	Hisano Numahata
Black Cat	Zakuroishi	Zakuroishi	Zakuroishi
Regina		Megurika Kawanishi	Megurika Kawanishi
Myana		Yuriko Yano	Yuriko Yano
Gao		Naoto Takeda	Naoto Takeda
Lio		Eruru Takeda	Eruru Takeda
Leona		Ryo Yuasa	Ryo Yuasa
Simon		Zex Flaga	Zex Flaga
Ludovic			Roku Aine
Anna			Mai Hazuki
Aria			Eruru Takeda

== Reception ==
The series received mixed to positive reviews.

Marcus Estrada of Hardcore Gamer gave a rating of 4 out of 5 to the first game and said, "Along with the cute aspects, it also brings (fictionalized) social issues into the spotlight in order to make Lilia’s eventual triumph all the greater. It might be short, but How to Take Off Your Mask is a good little tale." The first game also received the rating "Outstanding" with a score of 8.3 out of 10 on GAMERamble, with the reviewer saying, "Although not particularly deep, How To Take Off Your Mask is well written and explores some interesting themes. It is still rather linear, but the branching storyline and choices at least provides it with a bit more replay value than a kinetic visual novel. The likeable characters and strong humor definitely set the game apart, but since there is a free demo available we encourage everyone to try it out first."

Matt C. of Digitally Downloaded gave 3.5 stars out of 5 to the second game and said, "How to Fool a Liar King is a cute, charming romance that's easy to just relax with and enjoy."
