= Lichtspeer =

2016 action video game

- Developer(s): Lichthund
- Publisher(s): Lichthund
- Platform(s): Linux; macOS; Windows; PlayStation 4; PlayStation Vita; Nintendo Switch; Xbox One
- Release: September 27, 2016: Linux, macOS, Windows, PlayStation 4 September 27, 2016 PlayStation Vita April 11, 2017 Nintendo Switch September 7, 2017 Xbox One June 1, 2018
- Genre(s): Action
- Mode(s): Single-player

Lichtspeer is an action video game developed and published by Lichthund. The game was released in September 2016 for Microsoft Windows, macOS, Linux, and PlayStation 4. In 2017, it was released under the title Lichtspeer: Double Speer Edition for PlayStation Vita and Nintendo Switch. The game takes place in a futuristic version of the time of ancient Germanic mythology whereby the player controls a lone warrior that must fight off waves of enemies using a throwable "Lichtspeer" and several "Lichtpowers".

== Reception ==
Reception

Aggregate score
Aggregator	Score
Metacritic	PC: 72/100; PS4: 67/100; Vita: 66/100; Switch: 71/100

Lichtspeer was released to varied reviews from critics with all platforms garnering "mixed or average reviews" according to review aggregator website Metacritic.
