= League of Evil =

2011 video game

- Developer: Ravenous Games
- Platforms: iOS, PlayStation 4, PlayStation Vita, Nintendo Switch, Android, Microsoft Windows, macOS
- Release: iOS, Android: WW: February 3, 2011; Nintendo Switch: WW: August 31, 2017; Microsoft Windows, macOS: WW: October 25, 2016; PS4, PS Vita: WW: April 11, 2018
- Genre: Platform

League of Evil is a platform game developed by Canadian studio Ravenous Games and released by February 3, 2011. It was followed by League of Evil 2 and League of Evil 3.

== Critical reception ==
The game has a Metacritic score of 86% based on 17 critic reviews.

AppSafari said "One of the better platformers I've come across. It's no Super Mario Bros, but on its own, it's excellent. Very well done graphics with really nice animation, challenging and addictive gameplay, and really entertaining themes of Megaman-style wall jumps with super punches." AppSmile described it as "A thoroughly captivating, 5-Dimple winner." No DPad said "League of Evil is a rare find, a game that excels at short, quick bursts of gaming, but which also holds up in longer play sessions." AppSpy said "While other skill-based platformers eat up the charts on consoles and PCs, iOS owners can try their hand at League of Evil's challenging and easy to enjoy style." SlideToPlay wrote "League of Evil proves that challenging bite-sized levels are where platforming is at its best." IGN noted "Your twitch skills will be tested." GamePro wrote "This slick, retro-inspired platformer impresses with its responsive controls, addictive gameplay, and well-designed (if sometimes tough-as-nails) levels."

Vandal Online wrote "This is a good retro game which isn't very deep, but also doesn't try to. It is a simple, yet addictive game, which challenges the user." Gamezebo wrote "With 54 stages included in the app and the possibility of more to come, League of Evil offers a tremendous amount of value for its paltry 99 cent price of admission." Eurogamer said "The question is whether you can take the pain. The further you get, the more the game tightens the thumbscrews and does its upmost to drive you to the nearest loony bin. This game is not called League Of Evil for nothing." Modojo said "League of Evil isn't the most original game, but it's a lot of fun and worth your time. Now go out there and kill some scientists before they ruin everything." Destructoid said "There's a slight feeling that this has been done before, and with more personality, in recent game releases, but you won't find an experience like it on your iOS device, not with controls this tight and user-friendly. Fans of challenging platformers and nostalgic design would do very well to pick it up."

TouchGen said "Thankfully, League of Evil's controls are perfectly balanced and I found myself breezing through the opening levels almost on autopilot, thanks to the familiar and classically intuitive feel of the onscreen button setup." 148Apps said "League of Evil is a supernova – shining brightly for a brief moment before it fades away." Multiplayer.it wrote "League of Evil is not Super Meat Boy: the overall experience has been impoverished by the easiness of the game and the banality of the level design. Anyway, although it's certainly not a perfect platform, the game has a great 8-bit style and suitable controls. The really low price represents another fillip, while the developers will constantly publish new levels, traps and game modes." TouchArcade said "If you've enjoyed Super Meat Boy on any of the platforms it's available on, and have been looking for something similar for iOS, League of Evil is totally worth your dollar." Pocket Gamer UK said "As old skool as they come, League of Evil delivers an action-packed platformer perfect for quick thrills."
