= Ironcast =

2015 puzzle strategy video game

- Developer: Dreadbit
- Publisher: Ripstone
- Director: Daniel Leaver
- Producers: Daniel Leaver; Mark Pittam
- Designers: Daniel Leaver; Edmund Alcock; Ben Porter
- Programmer: Christopher Butler
- Artist: Amber Jones
- Writers: Daniel Leaver; Edmund Alcock; Ben Porter
- Composer: Edward Hargrave
- Engine: Unity
- Platforms: Linux; Microsoft Windows; OS X; Nintendo Switch; PlayStation 4; Xbox One
- Release: Microsoft Windows, Linux, OS X; March 26, 2015; PlayStation 4, Xbox One; March 1, 2016; Nintendo Switch; August 10, 2017
- Genres: Match-three, roguelike, turn-based strategy
- Mode: Single-player

Ironcast is a British turn-based strategy video game developed by Dreadbit and was released for PC platforms in March 2015, PS4 and Xbox One in March 2016, and Nintendo Switch version in August 2017. The game has individual missions played through a match-three system, and features procedurally generated missions, permadeath, and staples of the roguelike genre.

== Gameplay ==
Ironcast is set in a steampunk 19th century, the player commands mecha robots, Ironcasts. The player has to deploy them to repel a French invasion of Britain. Players can choose from an assortment of missions, and their successful completion will reward the player with repairs and upgrades to their Ironcast. The missions are conducted through a match-three system, with coloured tiles on the grid representing resources required for the Ironcast's operation.

== Production ==
Ironcast was developed by Dreadbit, a studio founded by Daniel Leaver, formerly a senior designer at Media Molecule. The game was part funded through a Kickstarter crowdfunding campaign, raising £10,183 in October 2014.

== Reception ==
The game received a positive critical reception on PC and Xbox One, with Metacritic scores of 75/100 and 78/100, respectively, and a mixed reception on PlayStation 4, with a Metacritic score of 70/100. Christian Donlan, reviewing the game at Eurogamer described it as "tense and personable and clever". John Walker at Rock, Paper, Shotgun found it "much more tactically thoughtful than a match-3 RPG has been before", though found the game's presentation dull.
