= Kotodama: The 7 Mysteries of Fujisawa =

2019 video game

- Developer: Art Co., Ltd / PQube Ltd
- Publisher: PQube
- Directors: Aya Sakurai, Takaya Miura
- Producer: Amaria Larchet
- Programmer: Toshio Inomata
- Platforms: Nintendo Switch, PlayStation 4, Windows
- Release: EU: May 31, 2019; NA: June 4, 2019
- Genres: Visual novel, puzzle
- Mode: Single-player

Kotodama: The 7 Mysteries of Fujisawa is a 2019 visual novel video game developed by Art and PQube for Nintendo Switch, PlayStation 4, Windows.

== Gameplay ==
In Kotodama: The 7 Mysteries of Fujisawa, the player chats with other characters to uncover clues. Each chapter's antagonist is defeated by stripping them naked, using the "happy meter" and a match three puzzle minigame.

== Plot and characters ==
The story sees a student, controlled by the player, making a pact with a demon fox named Mon-chan, wielding the power of Kotodama, to uncover facts and clues about sinister events at the school, Fujisawa Academy.

Characters are:

- Nanami Kagura, an energetic and optimistic girl, the first friend at the academy that the player meets
- Honoka Ichinose, a shy and quiet girl who loves animals
- Shuji Toyama, the most popular guy at the academy
- Yukino Tsubaki, the academy's spoilt and rich kid and who bears a grudge against Nanami
- Wakaba Asagiri, a girl who serves as President of the Occult Research Club
- Kujo Satsuki, the smartest student at the academy and who knows many secrets about the academy
- Chinatsu Hachisuka, a bossy girl
- Mikoto Sasaki, an incredible student and athlete at the academy before killing herself, haunting the academy since

== Development ==
Kotodama: The 7 Mysteries of Fujisawa was developed as the first original IP of PQube, who had only been a publisher up until that point.

== Reception ==
Reception

Aggregate scores
Aggregator	Score
Metacritic	62/100 (NS)
OpenCritic	43% recommend

Review score
Publication	Score
Pocket Gamer	3/5

The game has received "mixed or average" reviews according to Metacritic with a score of 62. Fellow review aggregator OpenCritic assessed that the game received weak approval, being recommended by 43% of critics.

Pocket Gamer scored it 3 out of 5, saying that it is "going to appeal to a very niche audience", although noted that the storylines are "messed-up" and criticised the lack of autosave. Matt S of Digitally Downloaded thought that the game is "so, so good", praising the fanservice, humor, character design and puzzles themselves.
