= Iris and the Giant =

- View of the main character "Iris"
- Developer(s): Louis Rigaud
- Publisher(s): Goblinz Studio; Maple Whispering Limited; Mugen Creations; Plug In Digital
- Engine: Unity
- Platform(s): Microsoft Windows macOS; Linux; Nintendo Switch
- Release: Windows, macOS, Linux; 27 February 2020; Nintendo Switch; 5 November 2020
- Genre(s): CCG role playing strategy
- Mode(s): Single-player

Iris and the Giant is a role-playing strategy video game developed by French designer Louis Rigaud and published by Goblinz Studio, Plug In Digital, Maple Whispering Limited and Mugen Creations. It was released for Microsoft Windows, macOS and Linux on 27 February 2020. The game blends RPG and Roguelike, but is mainly a collectible card game. A port for Nintendo Switch was released on 5 November 2020.

== Development ==
The game was inspired by the developer Louis Rigaud's experiences with creating "interactive papercraft books" for kids. According to the developer, post-launch updates will add new features after the release of the game. These include gamepad support and UI improvements based on feedback from the players.

== Plot ==
Iris and the Giant starts off with the main character getting dropped off at a swimming lesson. She finds herself struggling to jump into the pool and kids are laughing at her from below. This scene can be seen as a metaphor that describes the general plot-line of the game, a plot-line that explores the main character's struggles with depression and anxiety. Iris (the name of the main character) later finds herself on the river Styx, but the story does not follow the one explained in Greek mythology, that will say, that the river Styx is the connection between the living on earth and the underworld. Instead, Styx is shown as the land that distinguishes "the real from the imaginary". It's on this land that Iris fights her way to the top of the structure and every floor represents her inner demons.

== Gameplay ==
The game begins with a limited number of cards representing different attacks and defenses that will be used in combat against enemies on a grid. There are different types of weapons, for example, an axe that will attack all the enemies in the front row of the grid. Furthermore, there are swords that can be used sequentially if the player has more than one in their deck. If the player dies, the game restarts but the player will then earn rewards in the form of new cards and abilities that will make it easier to succeed in further efforts. There are a total of 51 cards to earn throughout the game that can enable specialized directions in combat and also various secrets and surprises to find while discovering the world. There are around 45 different types of enemies that the player will meet, these do often act in different ways. Some can, to mention a few actions, steal cards from the player and some can instead give the player benefits, more time with a shield and the ability to use more arrows from your hand in a single turn, for example. The player can also use magic in different ways as well as cards involving elemental effects, fire and lighting, for instance.

Iris and the Giant twists the roguelike cardgame genre by linking each type of attack card to a specific enemy demon; defeating that demon with a "steal" card allows the player to acquire more of that card, e.g. stealing from a skeleton with a shield will yield a "shield" card. Powerful cards not available from standard chests can be gained from defeating certain boss monsters, for example defeating a Giant Cat Archer with a steal card gives the player a Feline Bow that when held prevents attacks from cat-headed demons.

== Reception ==
Iris and the Giant did not get much attention from video game critics at its release. However, the reviewer for Buried Treasure compared the game to the deck-building game Meteorfall: Journeys, saying the following: "I really never thought I would ever be someone who played deckbuilding games. I never managed to get into Slay The Spire or Darkest Dungeon, and figured it wasn't a genre I'd ever get to grips with. And then I stumbled on Meteorfall. It was love at first sight. It clicked. I got it. I got really good at it! I played it until I was on game+++ modes for every character, in a way I never play games! I'm having very similar feelings about Iris And The Giant."
