= The Infectious Madness of Doctor Dekker =

2017 FMV murder mystery video game

- Developer: D'Avekki Studios
- Publisher: D'Avekki Studios (Note: Wales Interactive published the console versions.)
- Director: Tim Cowles
- Writers: Tim Cowles, Lynda Cowles
- Platforms: Microsoft Windows; macOS; Nintendo Switch; PlayStation 4; Xbox One
- Release: Windows, macOS; 19 May 2017; Switch, PS4, Xbox One; 5 June 2018
- Genres: Adventure, interactive film
- Mode: Single-player

The Infectious Madness of Doctor Dekker is an FMV murder mystery adventure video game developed by D'avekki Studios, written by Tim Cowles and Lynda Cowles, and released in 2017. Players play as a psychiatrist, trying to solve a murder whilst treating the patients of the recently deceased Doctor Dekker. The game was initially released for Microsoft Windows and macOS via Steam before being published on consoles by British game publishing studio, Wales Interactive.

Another game by the same studio titled The Shapeshifting Detective was released the following year.

== Gameplay ==
The player sees full-motion videos of characters who were patients of Doctor Dekker. The goal is to find out the details surrounding the death of Doctor Dekker, playing as a replacement psychiatrist and asking the patients questions. The player is free to switch between characters to find out more about them. In sessions with each patient, the player interacts by typing questions or comments into a text box. The game interprets the input and responds by playing out a full-motion video reply from the subject. A list of responses in the log that will sometimes have asterisks beside them. One asterisk means there's still a question to ask, two prompts to follow up with this character. Questions are generally free-form. Hints are available, but have a cooldown before they can be used again.

== Story ==
The full identity of the playable character is not known except for the fact they are a replacement psychiatrist. They have been brought in to find out why the previous Doctor Dekker was murdered and they're tasked with interviewing Doctor Dekker's many previous patients. One patient is a woman who blacks out and finds herself at the beach when she wakes up and another patient seems to relive the same day over and over again. One patient also believes that he gains an extra hour at the end of the day, during that hour time freezes and he is free to do whatever he likes without anyone knowing. The player's questions influence the events of the game and can lead to a variety of different responses ultimately resulting in different endings.

== Reception ==
On Metacritic, the PC and Nintendo Switch versions received positive reviews, and the PS4 version received mixed reviews.

Adventure Gamers and Rock Paper Shotgun both compared the game to Her Story. Adventure Gamers said it adds a few new twists and includes more dialogue, and Rock Paper Shotgun wrote that it does not always elegantly succeed at meeting its goals. For example, reviewer John Walker said that the game's parser misunderstands some obvious questions, though he felt that game remains "often very interesting" despite its limitations. Adventure Gamers concluded, "The Infectious Madness of Doctor Dekker is engrossing, disturbing and erudite, and though it's a little lacking in plot it's full of welcome ideas." Digitally Downloaded's reviewer said she was inspired to read H. P. Lovecraft's fiction because of the game's references to them; she considered these references to be its "shining point". Nintendo Life criticized the game's continuity errors.

The game was nominated for TIGA awards for diversity and heritage.
