= List of video games released in 2021 =

The following is a comprehensive index of all games released in 2021, sorted chronologically by release date, and divided by quarter. Information regarding developer, publisher, operating system, genre and type of release is provided where available

For a summary of 2021 in video games as a whole, see 2021 in video games.

== Legend ==
Video game platforms
ATRVCS	Atari VCS	DROID	Android	iOS	iOS, iPhone, iPod, iPadOS, iPad, visionOS, Apple Vision Pro
LIN	Linux, SteamOS	NS	Nintendo Switch	OSX	macOS
PS4	PlayStation 4	PS5	PlayStation 5	PSV	PlayStation Vita
Quest	Meta Quest / Oculus Quest family, including Oculus Rift	Stadia	Google Stadia	WIN	Windows, all versions Windows 95 and up
XBO	Xbox One	XBX/S	Xbox Series X/S		

Types of releases
Compilation	A compilation, anthology or collection of several titles, usually (but not always) belonging to the same series
Early access	A game launched in early access is unfinished and thus might contain bugs and glitches or have some of the content missing
Episodic	An episodic video game that is released in batches over a period of time
Expansion	A large-scale DLC to an already existing game that adds new story, areas and additions and/or changes to the game's mechanics
Full release	A full release of a game that launched in early access first
Limited	A special release (often called "Limited" or "Collector's Edition") with bonus collector's material. Often provided to people who pre-order a game
Port	The game first appeared on a different platform and a port was made. The game is like the original, with few or no differences
Remake	The game is an enhanced remake of an original, made using a new engine and/or assets and thus containing completely new sound, graphics and possibly changes to the story and/or gameplay
Remaster	The game is a remaster of an original, released on the same or different platform, with (usually minor) changes to graphics, sound and/or gameplay
Rerelease	The game was re-released on the same platform with no or only minor changes

Video game genres
Action	Action game	Action RPG	Action role-playing game	Action-adventure	Action-adventure game
Adventure	Adventure game	Battle royale	Battle royale game	Brawler	Beat 'em up
Business sim	Business simulation game	DCCG	Digital collectible card game	Deck building	Deck building game
Digital tabletop	Digital tabletop game	Fighting	Fighting game	FPS	First-person shooter
Hack and slash	Hack and slash	Horror	Horror game	Life sim	Life simulation game
Metroidvania	Metroidvania	MMO	Massively multiplayer online game	MOBA	Multiplayer online battle arena
Music	Music video game	Party	Party video game	PCA	Point-and-click adventure
Platformer	Platformer	Puzzle	Puzzle video game	Puzzle-platformer	Puzzle-platformer
Racing	Racing video game	Rhythm	Rhythm game	Roguelike	Roguelike, Roguelite
RPG	Role-playing video game	RTS	Real-time strategy	RTT	Real-time tactics
Run and gun	Run and gun game	Shoot 'em up	Shoot 'em up	Simulation	Simulation video game
Sports	Sports video game	Stealth	Stealth game	Strategy	Strategy video game
Survival	Survival game	Survival horror	Survival horror	Tactical RPG	Tactical role-playing game
TBS	Turn-based strategy	TPS	Third-person shooter	Vehicle sim	Vehicle simulation game
Vehicular combat	Vehicular combat game	Visual novel	Visual novel		

== List ==
=== January–March ===
Release date	Title	Platform	Type	Genre	Developer	Publisher	Ref.
January 7	Werewolf: The Apocalypse – Heart of the Forest	NS		Visual novel, RPG	Different Tales	Walkabout Games	
January 8	Iris.Fall	NS, PS4, XBO		Puzzle, Adventure	NExT Studios	PM Studios	
January 12	Five Nights at Freddy's: Core Collection	NS, PS4, XBO		Survival horror	Scott Cawthon	Maximum Games	
January 14	MXGP 2020	PS5		Racing	Milestone		
January 14	Scott Pilgrim vs. the World: The Game – Complete Edition	WIN, NS, PS4, XBO, Stadia		Brawler	Engine Software	Ubisoft	
January 20	Hitman 3	WIN, NS, PS4, PS5, XBO, XBX/S, Stadia		Stealth	IO Interactive		
January 21	Cookie Run: Kingdom	iOS, DROID, WIN		Action RPG	Devsisters		
January 21	Phoenotopia: Awakening	WIN		Action-adventure, Metroidvania, Platformer	Cape Cosmic		
January 21	Ride 4	PS5, XBX/S		Racing	Milestone		
January 22	Bladed Fury	NS, PS4, XBO		Action	NExT Studios	PM Studios	
January 26	Age of Empires II: Definitive Edition – Lords of the West	WIN		RTS	Forgotten Empires	Xbox Game Studios	
January 26	Atelier Ryza 2: Lost Legends & the Secret Fairy	WIN, NS, PS4, PS5		RPG	Gust Co. Ltd.	Koei Tecmo	
January 26	Cyber Shadow	WIN, NS, PS4, PS5, XBO		Platformer	Mechanical Head Studios	Yacht Club Games	
January 26	Fearless and United Guards	DROID		Action-adventure	nCore Games		
January 27	Dragon Quest Tact	iOS, DROID		Adventure	Aiming Inc., Square Enix	Square Enix	
January 28	Devour	WIN		Survival horror	Straight Back Games		
January 28	Disgaea 6: Defiance of Destiny (JP)	NS, PS4		Tactical RPG	Nippon Ichi Software		
January 28	Gal*Gun Returns (JP)	NS		Shoot 'em up (rail)	Inti Creates		
January 28	Märchen Forest: Mylne and the Forest Gift	WIN, NS, PS4		RPG	PrimaryOrbit	Clouded Leopard Entertainment	
January 28	The Medium	WIN, XBX/S		Horror (psych)	Bloober Team		
January 28	Mobile Suit Gundam: Battle Operation 2	PS5		TPS	Bandai Namco Entertainment		
January 28	Olija	WIN, NS, PS4, XBO		Action-adventure	Skeleton Crew Studio	Devolver Digital	
January 28	Sword of the Necromancer	WIN, NS, PS4, XBO		Roguelike, RPG	Grimorio of Games	Grimorio of Games, JanduSoft	
January 28	The Yakuza Remastered Collection	WIN, XBO		Action-adventure	Ryu Ga Gotoku Studio	Sega	
January 29	Bonkies	WIN, NS, PS4, XBO		Party	Studio Gauntlet	Crunching Koalas	
January 29	Buddy Mission: Bond (JP)	NS		Adventure	Koei Tecmo	Nintendo	
January 29	Gods Will Fall	WIN, NS, PS4, XBO, Stadia		Action-adventure	Clever Beans	Deep Silver	
January 29	The Pedestrian	PS4, PS5		Puzzle-platformer	Skookum Arts LLC		
January 29	Re:Zero − Starting Life in Another World: The Prophecy of the Throne	WIN, NS, PS4		Visual novel, Tactical RPG	Chime	Spike Chunsoft	
February 2	Control: Ultimate Edition	PS5, XBX/S		Action-adventure, TPS	Remedy Entertainment	505 Games	
February 2	Cultist Simulator	NS		Simulation	Weather Factory	Playdigious	
February 2	Destruction AllStars	PS5		Vehicular combat	Lucid Games	Sony Interactive Entertainment	
February 2	Ys IX: Monstrum Nox	PS4		Action RPG	Nihon Falcom	NIS America	
February 3	Habroxia 2	WIN, PS4, PSV, XBO, NS		Shoot 'em up (twin-stick)	Lillymo Games	Lillymo Games / EastAsiaSoft	
February 4	Blue Archive (JP)	iOS, DROID		Action RPG, Tactical RPG, RTS	Nexon Games	Yostar	
February 4	Haven	NS, PS4		Adventure, RPG	The Game Bakers		
February 4	Skyforge	NS		MMO, RPG	Allods Team / Obsidian Entertainment	My.com	
February 4	Blue Fire	NS, PS4, XBO, WIN		Action-adventure, Metroidvania, Platformer	Robi Studios	Graffiti Games	
February 4	Werewolf: The Apocalypse – Earthblood	WIN, PS4, PS5, XBO, XBX/S		Action RPG	Cyanide	Nacon	
February 5	Bokuhime Project (JP)	WIN		Adventure	Wizard Soft	Nippon Ichi Software	
February 5	Nioh 2 - The Complete Edition	WIN, PS4		Action RPG	Team Ninja	Sony Interactive Entertainment / Koei Tecmo	
February 5	Nioh 2 Remastered - The Complete Edition	PS5		Action RPG	Team Ninja	Sony Interactive Entertainment	
February 5	Nioh Remastered - The Complete Edition	PS5		Action RPG	Team Ninja	Sony Interactive Entertainment	
February 8	HuniePop 2: Double Date	WIN, OSX		Dating sim, Tile-matching	HuniePot		
February 11	Little Nightmares II	WIN, NS, PS4, XBO		Puzzle-platformer, Survival horror	Tarsier Studios	Bandai Namco Entertainment	
February 11	UnderMine	NS		Action-adventure, Roguelike	Thorium Entertainment		
February 12	Gal*Gun Returns	WIN, NS		Shoot 'em up (rail)	Inti Creates	PQube	
February 12	Super Mario 3D World + Bowser's Fury	NS		Platformer	Nintendo EPD, Nintendo Software Technology	Nintendo	
February 16	Azur Lane: Crosswave	NS		Shoot 'em up	Felistella	Idea Factory International	
February 16	Fallen Legion: Revenants	NS, PS4		Action RPG	YummyYummyTummy	NIS America	
February 16	Speed Limit	PS4		Action	Gamechuck	Chorus Worldwide	
February 17	Capcom Arcade Stadium	NS		Platformer	Capcom		
February 17	Doomsday Warrior	NS		Fighting			
February 17	Fire 'n Ice	NS		Puzzle			
February 17	Prehistorik Man	NS		Platformer			
February 17	Psycho Dream	NS		Platformer			
February 17	Shin Megami Tensei II (JP)	NS		RPG			
February 17	SNK vs. Capcom: The Match of the Millennium	NS		Fighting	SNK		
February 17	Speed Limit	WIN		Action	Gamechuck	Chorus Worldwide	
February 18	The 25th Ward: The Silver Case (JP)	NS		Adventure	Grasshopper Manufacture	Playism	
February 18	Anodyne 2: Return to Dust	NS, PS4, PS5, XBO, XBX/S		Action-adventure	Analgesic Productions	Ratalaika Games	
February 18	The Silver Case (JP)	NS		Adventure	Grasshopper Manufacture	Playism	
February 18	Speed Limit	NS		Action	Gamechuck	Chorus Worldwide	
February 18	Void Terrarium Plus (JP)	PS5		RPG, Roguelike	Nippon Ichi Software		
February 19	Speed Limit	XBO		Action	Gamechuck	Chorus Worldwide	
February 19	Thomas Was Alone	NS		Platformer	Mike Bithell Games	Ant Workshop	
February 23	Curse of the Dead Gods	WIN, NS, PS4, XBO		Action RPG, Roguelike	Passtech Games	Focus Home Interactive	
February 23	Horned Knight	PS4		Platformer	Josep Monzonis Hernandez	2Awesome Studio	
February 23	Persona 5 Strikers	WIN, NS, PS4		Hack and slash, RPG	Omega Force, P-Studio	Atlus	
February 23	Rogue Heroes: Ruins of Tasos	WIN, NS		Action RPG, Roguelike	Heliocentric Studios	Team17	
February 23	We Were Here	PS4		Puzzle, Adventure	Total Mayhem Games		
February 23	We Were Here Too	PS4		Puzzle, Adventure	Total Mayhem Games		
February 23	We Were Here Together	PS4		Puzzle, Adventure	Total Mayhem Games		
February 24	Horned Knight	XBO		Platformer	Josep Monzonis Hernandez	2Awesome Studio	
February 24	Umamusume: Pretty Derby (JP)	iOS, DROID		Raising sim	Cygames		
February 25	Cotton Reboot! (JP)	NS, PS4		Shoot 'em up	Success	Beep	
February 25	Darius Cozmic Revelation (JP)	NS, PS4		Shoot 'em up	M2	Taito	
February 25	Forward to the Sky	NS		Action-adventure	Animu Game	Cosen	
February 25	Ghosts 'n Goblins Resurrection	NS		Platformer	Capcom		
February 25	Hellpoint	NS		Action RPG	Cradle Games	tinyBuild	
February 25	Royal Match	iOS, DROID		Puzzle	Dream Games		
February 25	Yakuza: Like a Dragon (JP)	WIN, XBO, XBX/S		RPG	Ryu Ga Gotoku Studio	Sega	
February 26	Bravely Default 2	NS		RPG	Claytechworks	Nintendo	
February 26	Horned Knight	WIN, NS		Platformer	Josep Monzonis Hernandez	2Awesome Studio	
February 26	Rhythm Doctor	WIN, OSX		Rhythm	7th Beat Games		
March 2	Harvest Moon: One World	NS, PS4		Farming	Appci Corporation	Natsume Inc.	
March 2	Maquette	WIN, PS4, PS5		Puzzle	Graceful Decay	Annapurna Interactive	
March 2	Neptunia Virtual Stars	PS4		Hack and slash	Compile Heart	Idea Factory International	
March 2	Yakuza: Like a Dragon	PS5		RPG	Ryu Ga Gotoku Studio	Sega	
March 4	Ar Nosurge DX (JP)	WIN, NS, PS4		RPG	Gust	Koei Tecmo	
March 4	Ciel Nosurge DX (JP)	WIN, NS, PS4		Life sim	Gust	Koei Tecmo	
March 4	Everhood	WIN, NS		Adventure, RPG, Rhythm	Chris Nordgren, Jordi Roca	Foreign Gnomes, Surefire	
March 4	Gnosia	NS		Social deduction, RPG	Petit Depotto	Playism	
March 4	The Life and Suffering of Sir Brante	WIN		RPG	Sever	101XP	
March 4	Loop Hero	WIN, OSX, LIN		Deck building (roguelike)	Four Quarters	Devolver Digital	
March 4	Mortal Shell: Enhanced Edition	PS5, XBX/S		Action RPG	Cold Symmetry	Playstack	
March 4	Sea of Solitude: Director's Cut	NS		Adventure	Jo-Mei Games	Quantic Dream	
March 5	Postal Redux	PS4		Shoot 'em up	Running with Scissors	MD Games	
March 5	Two Point Hospital: Jumbo Edition	NS, PS4, XBO		Business sim	Two Point Studios	Sega	
March 9	Apex Legends	NS		Battle royale, FPS	Respawn Entertainment	Electronic Arts	
March 9	Gensou SkyDrift	PS4		Racing	illuCalab	Phoenixx	
March 9	Stronghold: Warlords	WIN		RTT	Firefly Studios		
March 10	If On A Winter's Night, Four Travelers	WIN		Adventure	Dead Idle Games		
March 11	Monster Energy Supercross: The Official Videogame 4	WIN, PS4, PS5, XBO, XBX/S, Stadia		Racing	Milestone		
March 12	A-Train: All Aboard! Tourism	NS		Simulation	Artdink		
March 12	Crash Bandicoot 4: It's About Time	NS, PS5, XBX/S		Platformer	Toys for Bob	Activision	
March 12	Phoenotopia: Awakening	OSX		Action-adventure, Metroidvania, Platformer	Cape Cosmic		
March 16	Kingdoms of Amalur: Re-Reckoning	NS		Action RPG, Hack and slash	Kaiko	THQ Nordic	
March 16	Mundaun	WIN, OSX, NS, PS4, XBO		Adventure, Horror	Hidden Fields	MVM Interactive	
March 16	R.B.I. Baseball 21	WIN, NS, PS4, XBO, XBX/S		Sports	MLB Advanced Media		
March 16	Samurai Shodown	XBX/S	Port	Fighting	SNK		
March 16	Saviors of Sapphire Wings & Stranger of Sword City Revisited	WIN, NS		RPG, Dungeon crawl	Experience	NIS America	
March 16	Stubbs the Zombie in Rebel Without a Pulse	NS, PS4, XBO		Action	Wideload Games	Aspyr	
March 16	Undertale	XBO, XBX/S		RPG	Toby Fox		
March 17	In Rays of the Light	NS, PS4, PS5, XBO		Action-adventure	Sergey Noskov	Sometimes You	
March 18	Caravan Stories (JP)	NS		MMO, RPG	Aiming Inc.		
March 18	DARQ: Complete Edition	NS		Horror (psych)	Unfold Games	Feardemic	
March 18	Gloria Union: Twin Fates in Blue Ocean FHD Edition (JP)	NS, iOS, DROID		Tactical RPG	Sting Entertainment	Atlus	
March 18	Jack Jeanne (JP)	NS		Visual novel	Broccoli		
March 18	The Legend of Heroes: Trails of Cold Steel IV (JP)	NS		RPG	Nihon Falcom	Nippon Ichi Software	
March 18	Maglam Lord (JP)	NS, PS4		Action RPG	Felistella	D3 Publisher	
March 18	Marvel's Avengers	PS5, XBX/S	Port	Action-adventure	Crystal Dynamics	Square Enix	
March 19	Can't Drive This	WIN, NS, PS4, PS5, XBO, XBX/S		Racing	Pixel Maniacs		
March 19	Plants vs. Zombies: Battle for Neighborville – Complete Edition	NS		TPS	PopCap Games	Electronic Arts	
March 19	Root Film	NS, PS4		Adventure, Visual novel	Kadokawa Games	PQube	
March 22	Vaporum: Lockdown	NS		Action RPG	Fatbot Games		
March 23	Arkham Horror: Mother's Embrace	WIN, NS, PS4, XBO		Adventure, Tactical RPG	Artefacts Studio	Asmodee Digital	
March 23	Overcooked! All You Can Eat	WIN, NS, PS4, XBO		Simulation	Ghost Town Games	Team17	
March 23	Puyo Puyo Tetris 2	WIN		Puzzle	Sega		
March 23	Story of Seasons: Pioneers of Olive Town	NS		RPG, Simulation	Marvelous	Xseed Games	
March 24	Love Live! School Idol Festival: After School Activity Wai-Wai! Home Meeting!!	PS4		Rhythm	KLabGames	Square Enix	
March 24	Paradise Lost	WIN, PS4, XBO		Adventure	PolyAmorous	All in! Games	
March 24	Tales from the Borderlands	NS		Adventure	Telltale Games	2K	
March 24	Where's Samantha?	WIN, NS, OSX		Puzzle	Respect Studios	ROKiT	
March 25	Black Legend	WIN, NS, PS4, PS5, XBO, XBX/S		TBS	Warcave		
March 25	Dandy Ace	WIN		Action RPG	Mad Mimic	Neowiz	
March 25	DARQ: Complete Edition	PS5, XBX/S		Horror (psych)	Unfold Games	Feardemic	
March 25	Evil Inside	WIN, NS, PS4, PS5, XBO, XBX/S		Horror (psych)	JanduSoft		
March 25	The Quintessential Quintuplets: Memories of a Quintessential Summer (JP)	NS, PS4		Visual novel	Mages		
March 25	Them's Fightin' Herds	LIN		Brawler	Mane6	Maximum Games	
March 25	Yakuza 6: The Song of Life	WIN, XBO		Action-adventure	Ryu Ga Gotoku Studio	Sega	
March 26	Balan Wonderworld	WIN, NS, PS4, PS5, XBO, XBX/S		Platformer	Balan Company / Arzest	Square Enix	
March 26	Crash Bandicoot 4: It's About Time	WIN		Platformer	Toys for Bob	Activision	
March 26	It Takes Two	WIN, PS4, PS5, XBO, XBX/S		Action-adventure	Hazelight Studios	Electronic Arts	
March 26	Kaze and the Wild Masks	WIN, NS, PS4, XBO, Stadia		Platformer	PixelHive	Soedesco	
March 26	Monster Hunter Rise	NS		Action RPG	Capcom		
March 26	Spacebase Startopia	WIN, NS, PS4, XBO		Simulation	Realmforge Studios	Kalypso Media	
March 26	Subverse	WIN		Shoot 'em up	FOW Interactive		
March 26	Tony Hawk's Pro Skater 1 + 2	PS5, XBX/S		Sports	Vicarious Visions	Activision	
March 27	Record of Lodoss War: Deedlit in Wonder Labyrinth	WIN		Metroidvania	Team Ladybug, Why So Serious?	Playism	
March 29	Neptunia Virtual Stars	WIN		Hack and slash	Compile Heart	Idea Factory International	
March 30	Disco Elysium: The Final Cut	WIN, OSX, PS4, PS5, Stadia		RPG	ZA/UM		
March 30	Evil Genius 2: World Domination	WIN		RTS, Simulation	Rebellion Developments		
March 30	Kingdom Hearts HD 1.5 Remix	WIN		Action RPG	Square Enix		
March 30	Kingdom Hearts HD 2.5 Remix	WIN		Action RPG	Square Enix		
March 30	Kingdom Hearts HD 2.8 Final Chapter Prologue	WIN		Action RPG	Square Enix		
March 30	Kingdom Hearts III + Re Mind	WIN		Action RPG	Square Enix		
March 30	Kingdom Hearts: Melody of Memory	WIN		Rhythm	Square Enix		
March 30	Narita Boy	WIN, NS, PS4, XBO		Action-adventure	Studio Koba	Team17	
March 30	Rogue Company	PS5		TPS	First Watch Games	Hi-Rez Studios	
March 30	UnderMine	PS4		Action-adventure, Roguelike	Thorium Entertainment		
March 31	The Binding of Isaac: Repentance	WIN		Roguelike	Nicalis		

=== April–June ===
Release date	Title	Platform	Type	Genre	Developer	Publisher	Ref.
April 1	Fighting EX Layer: Another Dash (JP)	NS		Fighting	Arika		
April 1	Outriders	WIN, PS4, PS5, XBO, XBX/S, Stadia		TPS, RPG	People Can Fly	Square Enix	
April 1	Resident Evil 7: Biohazard	Stadia	Port	Survival horror	Capcom		
April 2	Cut the Rope Remastered	iOS, DROID, OSX		Puzzle	Paladin Studios		
April 6	Lost Words: Beyond the Page	WIN, NS, PS4, XBO		Puzzle	Sketchbook Games	Modus Games	
April 6	Oddworld: Soulstorm	WIN, PS4, PS5		Cinematic platformer	Oddworld Inhabitants		
April 6	Star Wars: Republic Commando	NS, PS4		FPS	LucasArts	Aspyr	
April 7	Pac-Man 99	NS		Maze, Battle royale	Arika	Bandai Namco Entertainment	
April 8	Before Your Eyes	WIN		Adventure	GoodbyeWorld Games	Skybound Games	
April 8	Island	NS		Visual novel	Frontwing	Prototype	
April 8	What the Dub?	WIN, NS, PS4, XBO		Party	Wide Right Interactive		
April 9	The Legend of Heroes: Trails of Cold Steel IV	WIN, NS		RPG	Nihon Falcom		
April 13	Poison Control	NS, PS4		Action RPG	Nippon Ichi Software		
April 14	Tasomachi: Behind the Twilight	WIN		Action-adventure	Orbital Express	Playism	
April 15	SaGa Frontier Remastered	WIN, NS, PS4, iOS, DROID		RPG	Square Enix		
April 15	Shadow Man Remastered	WIN		Action-adventure	Nightdive Studios		
April 15	Stitchy in Tooki Trouble	NS		Platformer	Polygoat		
April 16	Super Meat Boy Forever	PS4, XBO		Platformer	Team Meat		
April 20	MLB The Show 21	PS4, PS5, XBO, XBX/S		Sports	San Diego Studio	Sony Interactive Entertainment	
April 22	Atelier Mysterious Trilogy Deluxe Pack	WIN, NS, PS4		RPG	Gust	Koei Tecmo	
April 22	MotoGP 21	WIN, NS, PS4, PS5, XBO, XBX/S, Stadia		Racing	Milestone		
April 22	ScourgeBringer	PS4, PSV		Deck building	Flying Oak Games	Dear Villagers	
April 22	Smelter	WIN, NS, PS4, XBO		Action, Strategy	X Plus	Dangen Entertainment	
April 22	Wonder Boy: Asha in Monster World (JP)	WIN, NS, PS4		Platformer, Metroidvania	Artdink	G Choice	
April 22	Wraith: The Oblivion – Afterlife	WIN, DROID		Horror	Fast Travel Games		
April 23	Judgment	PS5, XBX/S, Stadia		Action-adventure	Ryu Ga Gotoku Studio	Sega	
April 23	Nier Replicant ver.1.22474487139...	WIN, PS4, XBO	Remaster	Action RPG, Hack and slash	Toylogic	Square Enix	
April 27	Clan O'Conall and the Crown of the Stag	WIN		Platformer	HitGrab		
April 27	Death end re;Quest	NS		RPG	Compile Heart	Idea Factory International	
April 28	Genshin Impact	PS5		Action RPG	MiHoYo		
April 29	R-Type Final 2 (JP)	NS, PS4, XBO, XBX/S		Shoot 'em up	Granzella		
April 29	Total War: Rome Remastered	WIN, OSX, LIN		Strategy	Feral Interactive, Creative Assembly	Sega	
April 30	New Pokémon Snap	NS		Photography	Bandai Namco Studios	The Pokémon Company / Nintendo	
April 30	R-Type Final 2	WIN, NS, PS4, XBO, XBX/S		Shoot 'em up	Granzella	NIS America	
April 30	Returnal	PS5		TPS	Housemarque	Sony Interactive Entertainment	
April 30	Terminator: Resistance Enhanced	PS5		FPS	Teyon	Reef Entertainment	
May 4	Dragon Quest Builders 2	XBO		Action RPG	Square Enix		
May 4	Wreckfest	PS5		Vehicular combat, Racing	Bugbear Entertainment	THQ Nordic	
May 5	Save Me Mr Tako: Definitive Edition	WIN, NS		Platformer, Action RPG	Deneos Games	Deneos Games, Limited Run Games	
May 6	Metro Exodus: Enhanced Edition	WIN		FPS	4A Games	Deep Silver	
May 6	Raiden IV x MIKADO remix	NS		Shoot 'em up	Moss	UFO Interactive	
May 6	Skate City	WIN, NS, PS4, XBO		Sports	Agens	Snowman	
May 7	Baldur's Gate: Dark Alliance	PS4, XBO		Action RPG	Black Isle Studios	Interplay Entertainment	
May 7	Resident Evil Village	WIN, PS4, PS5, XBO, XBX/S, Stadia	Original	Survival horror	Capcom		
May 10	Hood: Outlaws & Legends	WIN, PS4, PS5, XBO, XBX/S		Action-adventure	Sumo Newcastle	Focus Home Interactive	
May 11	Call of the Sea	PS4, PS5		Adventure, Puzzle	Out of the Blue	Raw Fury	
May 11	Touhou LostWord	iOS, DROID		Action RPG, TBS			
May 13	Lost Ruins	WIN		Metroidvania, Action	Altari Games	Dangen Entertainment	
May 13	RWBY: Grimm Eclipse – Definitive Edition	NS		Hack and slash	Rooster Teeth Games	Aspyr	
May 14	Famicom Detective Club: The Girl Who Stands Behind	NS		Adventure	Mages	Nintendo	
May 14	Famicom Detective Club: The Missing Heir	NS		Adventure	Mages	Nintendo	
May 14	Mass Effect Legendary Edition	WIN, PS4, XBO	Remaster + Compilation	Action RPG	BioWare	Electronic Arts	
May 14	Subnautica	NS		Action-adventure	Unknown Worlds Entertainment		
May 14	Subnautica: Below Zero	WIN, NS, PS4, PS5, XBO, XBX/S		Action-adventure	Unknown Worlds Entertainment	Bandai Namco Entertainment	
May 18	Arcaea	NS		Rhythm	Lowiro		
May 18	Days Gone	WIN	Port	Action-adventure, Survival horror	Bend Studio	Sony Interactive Entertainment	
May 18	Geminose: Animal Popstars	NS		Music	Majesco		
May 18	Leisure Suit Larry: Wet Dreams Dry Twice	NS, PS4, XBO		Adventure	CrazyBunch	Assemble Entertainment	
May 18	SnowRunner	NS		Racing	Saber Interactive	Focus Home Interactive	
May 18	Void Terrarium Plus	PS5		RPG, Deck building	Nippon Ichi Software		
May 19	PowerWash Simulator	WIN		Simulation	FuturLab	Square Enix	
May 20	Akiba's Trip: Hellbound & Debriefed (JP)	NS, PS4		Action RPG	Acquire		
May 20	Angelique Luminarise (JP)	NS		Visual novel	Ruby Party	Koei Tecmo	
May 20	Baldur's Gate: Dark Alliance	NS		Action RPG	Black Isle Studios	Interplay Entertainment	
May 20	Just Die Already	WIN, NS, PS4, XBO		Action-adventure	DoubleMoose	Curve Digital	
May 20	Layers of Fear 2	NS		Horror (psych)	Bloober Team		
May 20	Manifold Garden	PS5		Puzzle	William Chyr Studio		
May 20	Rune Factory 5 (JP)	NS		RPG, Simulation	Marvelous		
May 20	The TakeOver	PS4		Brawler	Pelikan13	Dangen Entertainment	
May 20	Uncharted Waters 4 with Power-Up Kit HD Version (JP)	WIN, NS		TBS	Koei Tecmo		
May 21	An Airport for Aliens Currently Run by Dogs	WIN, XBX/S		Adventure	Strange Scaffold		
May 21	Knockout City	WIN, NS, PS4, PS5, XBO, XBX/S		Sports	Velan Studios	Electronic Arts	
May 21	Miitopia	NS		RPG	Grezzo	Nintendo	
May 21	Rust	PS4, XBO		Survival	Facepunch Studios, Double Eleven	Double Eleven	
May 25	Biomutant	WIN, PS4, XBO		Action RPG	Experiments 101	THQ Nordic	
May 25	Capcom Arcade Stadium	WIN, PS4, XBO		Platformer	Capcom		
May 25	Final Fantasy XIV	PS5		MMO, RPG	Square Enix		
May 25	King of Seas	WIN, NS, PS4, XBO		Action RPG	3DClouds	Team17	
May 25	Maneater	NS		Action RPG	Tripwire Interactive	Tripwire Interactive, Deep Silver	
May 25	Saints Row: The Third Remastered	PS5, XBX/S		Action-adventure	Volition	Deep Silver	
May 25	Shin Megami Tensei III: Nocturne HD Remaster	WIN, NS, PS4		RPG	Atlus		
May 26	Fire Emblem: Genealogy of the Holy War (JP)	NS		Tactical RPG			
May 26	Joe & Mac	NS		Platformer, Run and gun			
May 26	Magical Drop II	NS		Puzzle			
May 26	Ninja JaJaMaru-kun	NS		Platformer			
May 26	Spanky's Quest	NS		Platformer, Puzzle			
May 26	Super Baseball Simulator 1.000	NS		Sports (baseball)			
May 27	Earth Defense Force: World Brothers	WIN, NS, PS4		TPS	Yuke's	D3 Publisher	
May 27	Fighting EX Layer: Another Dash	NS		Fighting	Arika		
May 27	MechWarrior 5: Mercenaries	WIN, XBO, XBX/S		Vehicle sim	Piranha Games		
May 27	Super Bomberman R Online	WIN, NS, PS4, XBO		Action, Battle royale	Konami		
May 27	Tantei Bokumetsu (JP)	NS, PS4		Adventure	Nippon Ichi Software		
May 27	Trigger Witch	WIN, NS, PS4, XB1		Action-adventure	Rainbite	Rainbite, Eastasiasoft	
May 27	Warhammer Age of Sigmar: Storm Ground	WIN, NS, PS4, XBO		TBS	Gasket Games	Focus Home Interactive	
May 28	Loopers (JP)	WIN		Visual novel	Key	Visual Arts	
May 28	Song of Horror	PS4, XBO		Survival horror	Protocol Games	Raiser Games	
May 28	Wonder Boy: Asha in Monster World	NS, PS4		Platformer, Metroidvania	Artdink	ININ Games	
May 28	World's End Club	NS		Action-adventure	Too Kyo Games	IzanagiGames / NIS America	
June 1	Ghosts 'n Goblins Resurrection	WIN, PS4, XBO		Platformer	Capcom		
June 1	Griftlands	WIN		Deck building (roguelike)	Klei Entertainment		
June 1	Necromunda: Hired Gun	WIN, PS4, PS5, XBO, XBX/S		FPS	Streum On Studio	Focus Home Interactive	
June 1	Operation: Tango	WIN, PS4, PS5, XBO, XBX/S		Puzzle, Adventure	Clever Plays		
June 1	Spirit: Lucky's Big Adventure	WIN, NS, PS4, XBO		Adventure	aheartfulofgames	Outright Games	
June 1	Stonefly	WIN, NS, PS4, PS5, XBO, XBX/S		Action-adventure	Flight School Studios	MWM Interactive	
June 1	Virtua Fighter 5: Ultimate Showdown	PS4		Fighting	Ryu Ga Gotoku Studio, Sega AM2	Sega	
June 2	Overboard!	WIN, OSX, NS, iOS, DROID		Visual novel, Adventure	inkle		
June 3	Astalon: Tears of the Earth	WIN, NS, PS4, XBO		Action, Platformer	LABSworks	Dangen Entertainment	
June 3	Winds of Change	NS		Visual novel, RPG, Adventure	Klace	Crunching Koalas	
June 3	Wing of Darkness	WIN, NS, PS4		Shoot 'em up (rail)	Production Exabilities	Clouded Leopard Entertainment	
June 4	DC Super Hero Girls: Teen Power	NS		Action-adventure	Toybox	Nintendo	
June 4	Evergate	PS5		Puzzle-platformer	Stone Lantern Games	PQube	
June 4	Griftlands	NS, PS4, XBO		Deck building (roguelike)	Klei Entertainment		
June 4	The Persistence Enhanced	WIN, PS5, XBX/S		Action-adventure	Firesprite	Perp Games	
June 4	Sniper Ghost Warrior Contracts 2	WIN, PS4, XBO, XBX/S		Tactical shooter, Stealth	CI Games		
June 5	Mighty Goose	WIN, OSX, LIN, NS, PS4, PS5, XBO, XBX/S		Run and gun	Blastmode	Playism	
June 5	Umurangi Generation	NS		Photography	Origame Digital	Playism	
June 8	Chivalry 2	WIN, PS4, PS5, XBO, XBX/S		Hack and slash	Torn Banner Studios	Tripwire Interactive	
June 8	Edge of Eternity	WIN		RPG	Midgard Studio	Dear Villagers	
June 8	Neptunia ReVerse	PS5		RPG	Compile Heart	Idea Factory International	
June 8	Tails Noir	WIN		RPG, Adventure	EggNut	Raw Fury	
June 9	Alba: A Wildlife Adventure	NS, PS4, PS5, XBO, XBX/S		Adventure	Ustwo	PID Publishing	
June 9	No More Heroes	WIN		Action-adventure, Hack and slash	Grasshopper Manufacture	Xseed Games	
June 9	No More Heroes 2: Desperate Struggle	WIN		Action-adventure, Hack and slash	Grasshopper Manufacture	Xseed Games	
June 9	Phantasy Star Online 2: New Genesis	NA: WIN, XBO, XBX/S; JP: WIN, NS, PS4		Action RPG	Sega Online R&D	Sega	
June 10	Chicory: A Colorful Tale	WIN, OSX, PS4, PS5		Adventure	Greg Lobanov	Finji	
June 10	Final Fantasy VII Remake Intergrade	PS5		Action RPG	Square Enix	Square Enix	
June 10	Ninja Gaiden: Master Collection	WIN, NS, PS4, XBO		Action-adventure, Hack and slash	Team Ninja	Koei Tecmo	
June 11	Game Builder Garage	NS		Programming	Nintendo EPD	Nintendo	
June 11	Guilty Gear Strive	WIN, PS4, PS5		Fighting	Arc System Works	Arc System Works / Bandai Namco Entertainment	
June 11	Ratchet & Clank: Rift Apart	PS5	Original	Platformer, TPS	Insomniac Games	Sony Interactive Entertainment	
June 11	Star Wars Jedi: Fallen Order	PS5, XBX/S		Action-adventure	Respawn Entertainment	Electronic Arts	
June 13	Minute of Islands	WIN, NS, PS5, XBO		Puzzle, Platformer	Studio Fizbin	Mixtvision	
June 15	Dark Deity	WIN		Tactical RPG	Sword & Axe LLC	Freedom Games	
June 15	The Elder Scrolls Online	PS5, XBX/S		MMO, RPG	ZeniMax Online Studios	Bethesda Softworks	
June 15	Wildermyth	WIN		Tactical RPG	Worldwalker Games		
June 17	Roguebook	WIN, OSX, LIN		Deck building (roguelike)	Abrakam Entertainment	Nacon	
June 17	Wingspan	XBO, XBX/S		Digital tabletop, Strategy	Monster Couch	Monster Couch, Stonemaier Games	
June 18	Metro Exodus Complete Edition	PS5, XBX/S		FPS, Survival horror	4A Games	Deep Silver	
June 22	Alex Kidd in Miracle World DX	WIN, NS, PS4, PS5, XBO, XBX/S		Action, Platformer	Jankenteam	Merge Games	
June 22	Dungeons & Dragons: Dark Alliance	WIN, PS4, PS5, XBO, XBX/S		RPG	Tuque Games	Wizards of the Coast	
June 22	Ender Lilies: Quietus of the Knights	WIN, NS		Metroidvania	Live Wire, Adglobe	Binary Haze Interactive	
June 22	Olympic Games Tokyo 2020 - The Official Video Game	WIN, NS, PS4, XBO, Stadia		Sports	Sega		
June 23	Worms Rumble	NS, XBO, XBX/S		Action, Battle royale	Team17		
June 24	The Caligula Effect 2 (JP)	NS, PS4		RPG	Historia	FuRyu	
June 24	The Cruel King and the Great Hero (JP)	NS, PS4		RPG	Nippon Ichi Software		
June 24	Legend of Mana	WIN, NS, PS4		Action RPG	Square Enix		
June 24	Nayuta no Kiseki Kai (JP)	PS4		Action RPG	Nihon Falcom		
June 24	Samurai Warriors 5 (JP)	NS, PS4		Hack and slash	Omega Force	Koei Tecmo	
June 25	Mario Golf: Super Rush	NS		Sports	Camelot Software Planning	Nintendo	
June 25	Scarlet Nexus	WIN, PS4, PS5, XBO, XBX/S		Action RPG	Bandai Namco Studios	Bandai Namco Entertainment	
June 25	Tony Hawk's Pro Skater 1 + 2	NS		Sports	Vicarious Visions	Activision	
June 29	Chicken Police: Paint It Red!	iOS, DROID		Visual novel, Adventure	The Wild Gentlemen	HandyGames	
June 29	Destroy All Humans!	NS		Action-adventure	Black Forest Games	THQ Nordic	
June 29	Disgaea 6: Defiance of Destiny	NS		Tactical RPG	Nippon Ichi Software		
June 29	Ender Lilies: Quietus of the Knights	XBO, XBX/S		Metroidvania	Live Wire, Adglobe	Binary Haze Interactive	
June 29	Ghoul Patrol	WIN, NS, PS4, XBO		Run and gun	Dotemu	Lucasfilm Games	
June 29	Sky: Children of the Light	NS		Adventure	Thatgamecompany		
June 29	Wonder Boy: Asha in Monster World	WIN		Platformer, Metroidvania	Artdink	ININ Games	
June 29	Zombies Ate My Neighbors	WIN, NS, PS4, XBO		Run and gun	Dotemu	Lucasfilm Games	
June 30	Doki Doki Literature Club Plus!	WIN, NS, PS4, PS5, XBO, XBX/S		Visual novel	Team Salvato	Serenity Forge	

=== July–September ===
Release date	Title	Platform	Type	Genre	Developer	Publisher	Ref.
July 1	Blaster Master Zero	XBO, XBX/S		Platformer	Inti Creates		
July 2	Phoenotopia: Awakening	PS4		Action-adventure, Metroidvania, Platformer	Cape Cosmic	Flyhigh Works	
July 6	The 25th Ward: The Silver Case	NS		Adventure	Grasshopper Manufacture	NIS America / Playism	
July 6	A Plague Tale: Innocence	NS, PS5, XBX/S		Action-adventure, Survival horror	Asobo Studio	Focus Home Interactive	
July 6	The Silver Case	NS		Adventure	Grasshopper Manufacture	NIS America / Playism	
July 6	Ys IX: Monstrum Nox	WIN, NS		Action RPG	Nihon Falcom	NIS America	
July 8	Boomerang X	WIN, NS		Action	Dang!	Devolver Digital	
July 8	Crash Drive 3	WIN, PS4, PS5, XBO, XBX/S, NS, iOS, DROID		Action, Racing	M2H		
July 8	Fuuraiki 4 (JP)	NS, PS4		Adventure	FOG	Nippon Ichi Software	
July 8	Layton's Mystery Journey: Katrielle and The Millionaires' Conspiracy DX+ (JP)	NS		Puzzle, Adventure	h.a.n.d.	Level-5	
July 8	Sam & Max: This Time It's Virtual	Quest		Adventure	HappyGiant		
July 9	Monster Hunter Stories 2: Wings of Ruin	WIN, NS		RPG	Capcom		
July 15	Blaster Master Zero 2	XBO, XBX/S		Platformer	Inti Creates		
July 15	Trials of Mana	iOS, DROID		RPG	Square Enix		
July 16	F1 2021	WIN, PS4, PS5, XBO, XBX/S		Racing	Codemasters	EA Sports	
July 16	The Legend of Zelda: Skyward Sword HD	NS		Action-adventure	Tantalus Media	Nintendo	
July 16	Punishing: Gray Raven	iOS, DROID		Action RPG, Hack and slash	Kuro Games		
July 20	Akiba's Trip: Hellbound & Debriefed	WIN, NS, PS4		Action RPG	Acquire	Xseed Games	
July 20	Cotton Reboot!	NS, PS4		Shoot 'em up	Success	ININ Games	
July 20	Cris Tales	WIN, NS, PS4, PS5, XBO, XBX/S, Stadia		RPG	Dreams Uncorporated, Syck	Modus Games	
July 20	Death's Door	WIN, XBO, XBX/S		Action-adventure	Acid Nerve	Devolver Digital	
July 20	Ender Lilies: Quietus of the Knights	PS4		Metroidvania	Live Wire, Adglobe	Binary Haze Interactive	
July 20	Loopers (JP)	iOS, DROID		Visual novel	Key	Visual Arts	
July 20	Wingspan	iOS		Digital tabletop	Monster Couch	Monster Couch, Stonemaier Games	
July 21	Pokémon Unite	NS		MOBA	TiMi Studio Group	The Pokémon Company / Nintendo	
July 22	Last Stop	WIN, NS, PS4, PS5, XBO, XBX/S		Adventure	Variable State	Annapurna Interactive	
July 23	Orcs Must Die! 3	WIN, PS4, XBO, XBX/S		Tower defense	Robot Entertainment		
July 26	Idol Manager	WIN		Life sim	Glitch Pitch	Playism	
July 27	The Great Ace Attorney Chronicles	WIN, NS, PS4		Adventure	Capcom		
July 27	Hell Let Loose	WIN		FPS	Black Matter	Team17	
July 27	Microsoft Flight Simulator	XBX/S		Vehicle sim (plane)	Asobo Studio	Xbox Game Studios	
July 27	Neo: The World Ends with You	NS, PS4		Action RPG	Square Enix, h.a.n.d.	Square Enix	
July 27	Samurai Warriors 5	WIN, NS, PS4, XBO		Hack and slash	Omega Force	Koei Tecmo	
July 27	Tribes of Midgard	WIN, PS4, PS5		Sandbox, Survival	Norsfell	Gearbox Publishing	
July 28	Bombuzal	NS		Puzzle			
July 28	Chernobylite	WIN		Survival	The Farm 51	All in! Games	
July 28	Claymates	NS		Platformer			
July 28	The Forgotten City	WIN, PS4, PS5, XBO, XBX/S		Adventure	Modern Storyteller	Dear Villagers	
July 28	Jelly Boy	NS		Platformer			
July 28	Shin Megami Tensei If… (JP)	NS		RPG			
July 28	Unbound: Worlds Apart	WIN		Puzzle-platformer	Alien Pixel Studios		
July 29	Abomi Nation	WIN		RPG	Orange Pylon Games	DANGEN Entertainment	
July 29	The Ascent	WIN, XBO, XBX/S		Action RPG	Neon Giant	Curve Digital	
July 29	Blaster Master Zero 3	WIN, NS, PS4, XBO, XBX/S		Platformer	Inti Creates		
July 29	Blaster Master Zero Trilogy: MetaFight Chronicle (JP)	NS, PS4		Platformer	Inti Creates		
July 29	Eldest Souls	WIN, NS, PS4, PS5, XBO, XBX/S		Soulslike, Action RPG	Fallen Flag Studio	United Label	
July 29	Fuga: Melodies of Steel	WIN, NS, PS4, PS5, XBO, XBX/S		Tactical RPG	CyberConnect2		
July 29	Omno	WIN, NS, PS4, XBO		Adventure	Studio Inkyfox	Studio Inkyfox / Future Friends Games	
July 29	Paint the Town Red	WIN, NS, PS4, PS5, XBO, XBX/S		Action	South East Games		
July 30	10 Second Ninja X	NS		Platformer	Four Circle Interactive	Curve Games	
August 2	Age of Empires III: Definitive Edition – The African Royals	WIN		RTS	Forgotten Empires, Tantalus Media	Xbox Game Studios	
August 2	Grime	WIN, Stadia		Adventure, Platformer, Metroidvania	Clover Bite	Akupara Games	
August 3	In Sound Mind	WIN, NS, PS5, XBX/S		Horror	We Create Stuff	Modus Games	
August 5	The Falconeer: Warrior Edition	NS, PS4, PS5		Aerial combat	Tomas Sala	Wired Productions	
August 6	Zengeon	NS		Action RPG	IndieLeague Studio	PQube	
August 9	Hellblade: Senua's Sacrifice	XBX/S		Action-adventure, Hack and slash	Ninja Theory		
August 9	I Am Dead	PS4, PS5, XBO, XBX/S		Adventure	Hollow Ponds	Annapurna Interactive	
August 10	Age of Empires II: Definitive Edition - Dawn of the Dukes	WIN		RTS	Forgotten Empires	Xbox Game Studios	
August 10	Black Book	WIN, NS, PS4, XBO		Adventure, RPG	Morteshka	HypeTrain Digital	
August 10	Ever Forward	NS, PS4, PS5, XBO, XBX/S		Adventure, Puzzle	Pathea Games	PM Studios	
August 10	Godfall	PS4		Action RPG	Counterplay Games	Gearbox Publishing	
August 10	Shadowverse: Champion's Battle	NS		DCCG, RPG	Cygames	Xseed Games	
August 11	Axiom Verge 2	WIN, NS, PS4		Metroidvania	Thomas Happ Games		
August 11	Boyfriend Dungeon	WIN, NS, XBO		Dungeon crawl, Dating sim	Kitfox Games		
August 11	Garden Story	WIN, OSX, NS		Action RPG	Picogram	Rose City Games	
August 12	Art of Rally	NS, XBO, XBX/S		Racing	Funselektor Labs		
August 12	Foreclosed	WIN, NS, PS4, PS5, XBO, XBX/S, Stadia		Action-adventure	Antab	Merge Games	
August 12	Naraka: Bladepoint	WIN		Action-adventure	24 Entertainment	NetEase Games	
August 12	Old Friends Dog Game	iOS, DROID		Simulation	Runaway Play		
August 13	Hades	PS4, PS5, XBO, XBX/S		Action-adventure	Supergiant Games		
August 13	Paw Patrol The Movie: Adventure City Calls	WIN, NS, PS4, XBO, Stadia		Adventure	Drakhar Studio	Outright Games	
August 16	Road 96	WIN, NS		Adventure	DigixArt		
August 17	Humankind	WIN, OSX, Stadia		4X	Amplitude Studios	Sega	
August 19	Recompile	WIN, PS5, XBX/S		Metroidvania	Phigames	Dear Villagers	
August 19	RiMS Racing	WIN, NS, PS4, PS5, XBO, XBX/S		Racing	RaceWard Studio	Nacon	
August 19	Twelve Minutes	WIN, XBO, XBX/S		Adventure	Luis Antonio	Annapurna Interactive	
August 19	Yuoni	WIN, PS4, PS5, XBO, XBX/S		Survival horror	Tricore Inc.	Chorus Worldwide Games	
August 20	Arietta of Spirits	WIN, NS, PS4, XBO		Action-adventure	Third Spirit Games	Red Art Games	
August 20	Ghost of Tsushima Director's Cut	PS4, PS5		Action-adventure	Sucker Punch Productions	Sony Interactive Entertainment	
August 20	Madden NFL 22	WIN, PS4, PS5, XBO, XBX/S, Stadia		Sports	EA Tiburon	EA Sports	
August 24	Aliens: Fireteam Elite	WIN, PS4, PS5, XBO, XBX/S		Action-adventure, TPS	Cold Iron Studios	20th Century Games	
August 24	King's Bounty II	WIN, NS, PS4, XBO		Tactical RPG	1C Company	Deep Silver	
August 24	Sniper Ghost Warrior Contracts 2	PS5		Tactical shooter, Stealth	CI Games		
August 25	Murder Mystery Machine	WIN, NS, PS4, XBO		Adventure	Blazing Griffin	Microids	
August 25	Phoenotopia: Awakening	XBO, XBX/S		Action-adventure, Metroidvania, Platformer	Cape Cosmic	Flyhigh Works	
August 25	Psychonauts 2	WIN, OSX, LIN, PS4, XBO, XBX/S		Platformer	Double Fine	Xbox Game Studios	
August 26	Hotel Life: A Resort Simulator	WIN, NS, PS4, PS5, XBO, XBX/S		Business sim	RingZero Game Studio	Nacon	
August 26	The Legend of Heroes: Trails into Reverie (JP)	WIN, NS		RPG	Nihon Falcom	Clouded Leopard Entertainment	
August 26	Spelunky	NS		Platformer, Roguelike	Mossmouth		
August 26	Spelunky 2	NS		Platformer, Roguelike	Mossmouth, BlitWorks	Mossmouth	
August 26	Super Animal Royale	NS, PS4, PS5, XBO, XBX/S, Stadia		Battle royale	Pixile	Modus Games	
August 27	Baldo	WIN, NS, PS4, XBO		Action-adventure, RPG	NAPS team		
August 27	No More Heroes III	NS		Action-adventure, Hack and slash	Grasshopper Manufacture		
August 27	Tormented Souls	WIN, PS5, XBX/S		Survival horror	Dual Effect, Abstract Digital	PQube	
August 31	The Big Con	WIN, XBO, XBX/S		Adventure	Mighty Yell	Skybound Games	
August 31	Rustler	WIN, NS, PS4, PS5, XBO, XBX/S		Action-adventure	Jutsu Games	Modus Games	
September 1	Cloud Gardens	WIN, OSX, XBO, XBX/S, NS		Simulation, Puzzle	Noio	Coatsink	
September 1	Jumanji: The Curse Returns	WIN		Adventure, Simulation	Marmalade Game Studio		
September 1	Lake	WIN, XBO, XBX/S		Adventure	Gamious	Whitehorn Digital	
September 1	Smelter	PS5		Action, Strategy	X Plus	Dangen Entertainment	
September 2	Bravely Default 2	WIN		RPG	Claytechworks	Square Enix	
September 2	Demon Gaze Extra (JP)	NS, PS4		RPG	Cattle Call	Kadokawa Games	
September 2	Kitaria Fables	WIN, NS, PS4, PS5, XBO, XBX/S		Action-adventure, RPG	Twin Hearts	PQube	
September 2	WRC 10	WIN, PS4, PS5, XBO, XBX/S		Racing	Kylotonn	Nacon	
September 3	Big Rumble Boxing: Creed Champions	WIN, NS, PS4, XBO		Sports	Survios		
September 3	The Medium	PS5		Horror (psych)	Bloober Team		
September 7	Bus Simulator 21	WIN, PS4, XBO		Vehicle sim	Stillalive Studios	Astragon Entertainment	
September 7	Chernobylite	PS4, XBO		Survival	The Farm 51	All in! Games	
September 7	Crown Trick	PS4, XBO		Adventure, RPG, rougelike	NExT Studios	Team17	
September 7	F.I.S.T.: Forged In Shadow Torch	WIN, PS4, PS5		Metroidvania	TiGames	Bilibili	
September 7	Sonic Colors: Ultimate	WIN, NS, PS4, XBO		Platformer	Blind Squirrel Games	Sega	
September 9	The Artful Escape	WIN, XBO, XBX/S		Platformer	Beethoven & Dinosaur	Annapurna Interactive	
September 10	Life Is Strange: True Colors	WIN, PS4, PS5, XBO, XBX/S, Stadia	Original	Adventure	Deck Nine	Square Enix	
September 10	Lost in Random	WIN, NS, PS4, PS5, XBO, XBX/S		Action-adventure	Zoink Games	Electronic Arts	
September 10	NBA 2K22	WIN, NS, PS4, PS5, XBO, XBX/S		Sports	Visual Concepts	2K Games	
September 10	Tales of Arise	WIN, PS4, PS5, XBO, XBX/S		Action RPG	Bandai Namco Studios	Bandai Namco Entertainment	
September 10	WarioWare: Get It Together!	NS		Party	Intelligent Systems, Nintendo EPD	Nintendo	
September 14	Cruis'n Blast	NS		Racing	Raw Thrills	GameMill Entertainment	
September 14	Deathloop	WIN, PS5		FPS	Arkane Studios	Bethesda Softworks	
September 15	Tomb Rumble	WIN, OSX, LIN		Platformer	Atelier 801		
September 16	BanG Dream! Girls Band Party! (JP)	NS		Rhythm	Craft Egg	Bushiroad	
September 16	Eastward	WIN, OSX, NS		RPG	Pixpil	Chucklefish	
September 16	Metallic Child	WIN, NS		Action, Roguelike	Studio HG	Crest	
September 16	SINce Memories: Off the Starry Sky (JP)	NS, PS4		Visual novel	Mages		
September 16	Skatebird	WIN, NS, XBO		Sports	Glass Bottom Games		
September 17	Aragami 2	WIN, PS4, PS5, XBO, XBX/S		Stealth, Action-adventure	Lince Works		
September 17	Deltarune: Chapter 2	WIN, OSX		RPG, Adventure	Toby Fox		
September 17	Ni no Kuni II: Revenant Kingdom – Prince's Edition	NS		RPG	Level-5	Bandai Namco Entertainment	
September 17	Tails of Iron	WIN, NS, PS4, PS5, XBO, XBX/S		Action RPG	Odd Bug Studio	United Label	
September 17	Toem	WIN, NS, PS5		Photography, Adventure	Something We Made		
September 21	Beast Breaker	WIN, NS		RPG	Vodeo Games		
September 21	Kena: Bridge of Spirits	WIN, PS4, PS5		Action-adventure	Ember Lab		
September 21	World War Z: Aftermath	WIN, PS4, XBO		FPS	Saber Interactive		
September 22	Pokémon Unite	iOS, DROID		MOBA	TiMi Studio Group	The Pokémon Company	
September 23	Actraiser Renaissance	WIN, NS, PS4, iOS, DROID		Platformer, City builder	Sonic Powered, Square Enix	Square Enix	
September 23	Castlevania Advance Collection	WIN, NS, PS4, XBO		Platformer	M2	Konami	
September 23	Deltarune: Chapter 2	NS, PS4		RPG, Adventure	Toby Fox, 8-4	8-4	
September 23	Diablo II: Resurrected	WIN, NS, PS4, PS5, XBO, XBX/S		Action RPG	Blizzard Entertainment, Vicarious Visions	Blizzard Entertainment	
September 23	The Forgotten City	NS		Adventure	Modern Storyteller	Dear Villagers	
September 23	Sable	WIN, OSX, XBX/S		Adventure	Shedworks	Raw Fury	
September 23	Staxel	NS		RPG, Simulation	Plukit		
September 24	Death Stranding Director's Cut	PS5		Action	Kojima Productions	Sony Interactive Entertainment	
September 24	Dragon Ball Z: Kakarot	NS		Action RPG	CyberConnect2	Bandai Namco Entertainment	
September 24	Lost Judgment	PS4, PS5, XBO, XBX/S		Action-adventure	Ryu Ga Gotoku Studio	Sega	
September 28	Away: The Survival Series	WIN, PS4, PS5, XBO		Action-adventure, Survival	Breaking Walls		
September 28	Dandy Ace	NS, XBO		Action RPG	Mad Mimic	Neowiz	
September 28	Dragon Quest The Adventure of Dai: A Hero's Bonds	iOS, DROID		Adventure	Square Enix, DeNA	Square Enix	
September 28	Ghostrunner	PS5, XBX/S		Action	One More Level	505 Games, All in! Games	
September 28	Lemnis Gate	WIN, PS4, PS5, XBO, XBX/S		FPS	Ratloop Games Canada	Frontier Foundry	
September 28	Neo: The World Ends with You	WIN		Action RPG	Square Enix, h.a.n.d.	Square Enix	
September 28	New World	WIN		MMO, RPG	Amazon Games Orange County	Amazon Games	
September 28	Outer Wilds: Echoes of the Eye	WIN, PS4, XBO		Action-adventure	Mobius Digital	Annapurna Interactive	
September 29	Centipede: Recharged	WIN, NS, PS4, PS5, XBO, XBX/S, ATRVCS		Shoot 'em up	Adamvision Studios, Sneakybox	Atari	
September 29	Insurgency: Sandstorm	PS4, XBO		FPS	New World Interactive	Focus Home Interactive	
September 30	Astria Ascending	WIN, NS, PS4, PS5, XBO, XBX/S		RPG	Artisan Studios	Dear Villagers	
September 30	Darksiders III	NS		Action RPG	Gunfire Games	THQ Nordic	
September 30	eFootball 2022	WIN, PS4, PS5, XBO, XBX/S, iOS, DROID		Sports	Konami		
September 30	The Eternal Cylinder	WIN, PS4, XBO		Survival	ACE Team		
September 30	Hot Wheels Unleashed	WIN, NS, PS4, PS5, XBO, XBX/S		Racing	Milestone		
September 30	Industria	WIN, PS5, XBX/S		FPS	Bleakmill	Headup	
September 30	The Legend of Heroes: Trails Through Daybreak (JP)	PS4		RPG	Nihon Falcom		
September 30	Mary Skelter Finale	NS, PS4		Action RPG, Roguelike	Compile Heart	Idea Factory International	
September 30	Melty Blood: Type Lumina	WIN, NS, PS4, XBO		Fighting	French Bread	Delightworks	
September 30	Xuan-Yuan Sword VII	PS4, XBO		Action RPG	Softstar, DOMO Studio, Yooreka Studio	eastasiasoft	

=== October–December ===
Release date	Title	Platform	Type	Genre	Developer	Publisher	Ref.
October 1	FIFA 22	WIN, NS, PS4, PS5, XBO, XBX/S, Stadia		Sports	EA Vancouver	EA Sports	
October 5	Alan Wake Remastered	WIN, PS4, PS5, XBO, XBX/S	Remaster	Action-adventure	Remedy Entertainment	Epic Games Publishing	
October 5	BPM: Bullets Per Minute	PS4, XBO		FPS, Roguelike	Awe Interactive		
October 5	Hell Let Loose	PS5, XBX/S		FPS	Black Matter	Team17	
October 5	Jett: The Far Shore	WIN, PS4, PS5		Action-adventure	Superbrothers, Pine Scented Software	Superbrothers	
October 5	Lego Marvel Super Heroes	NS		Action-adventure	Traveller's Tales	Warner Bros. Interactive Entertainment	
October 5	Nickelodeon All-Star Brawl	WIN, NS, PS4, PS5, XBO, XBX/S		Fighting	Ludosity, Fair Play Labs	NA: GameMill Entertainment; EU: Maximum Games	
October 5	Super Monkey Ball Banana Mania	WIN, NS, PS4, PS5, XBO, XBX/S		Platformer	Ryu Ga Gotoku Studio	Sega	
October 6	Art of Rally	PS4, PS5		Racing	Funselektor Labs		
October 7	Cooking Companions	WIN		Horror (psych), Visual novel	Deer Dream Studios	Serenity Forge	
October 7	Far Cry 6	WIN, PS4, PS5, XBO, XBX/S, Stadia	Original	FPS	Ubisoft Toronto	Ubisoft	
October 8	Metroid Dread	NS		Action-adventure	MercurySteam, Nintendo EPD	Nintendo	
October 8	Tetris Effect: Connected	NS		Puzzle	Monstars	Enhance Games	
October 12	Back 4 Blood	WIN, PS4, PS5, XBO, XBX/S		FPS, Survival horror	Turtle Rock Studios	Warner Bros. Interactive Entertainment	
October 12	Disco Elysium: The Final Cut	NS, XBO, XBX/S		RPG	ZA/UM		
October 12	Lone Echo II	Quest		Adventure	Ready At Dawn	Oculus Studios	
October 12	Monster Crown	NS		RPG	Aurum	Soedesco	
October 12	Poppy Playtime	WIN		Survival horror	MOB Games		
October 14	Aeon Must Die!	WIN, NS, PS4, XBO		Brawler	Limestone Games	Focus Home Interactive	
October 14	Dungeon Encounters	WIN, NS, PS4		RPG	Cattle Call	Square Enix	
October 14	The Idolmaster Starlit Season (JP)	WIN, PS4		Raising sim, Rhythm	Bandai Namco Studios	Bandai Namco Entertainment	
October 14	The Jackbox Party Pack 8	WIN, OSX, LIN, NS, PS4, PS5, XBO, XBX/S		Party	Jackbox Games		
October 14	Monark (JP)	NS, PS4, PS5		RPG	Lancarse	FuRyu	
October 14	ElecHead	WIN		Puzzle-platformer	NamaTakahashi		
October 15	Crysis Remastered Trilogy	WIN, NS, PS4, XBO		FPS	Crytek		
October 15	Demon Slayer: Kimetsu no Yaiba – The Hinokami Chronicles	WIN, PS4, PS5, XBO, XBX/S		Fighting	CyberConnect2	JP: Aniplex; WW: Sega	
October 15	The Good Life	WIN, NS, PS4, XBO		RPG	White Owls Inc.	Playism	
October 15	NHL 22	PS4, PS5, XBO, XBX/S		Sports	EA Vancouver	EA Sports	
October 18	Nuclear Blaze	OSX, WIN		Action-adventure	Deepnight Games		
October 19	The Caligula Effect 2	NS, PS4		RPG	Historia	NIS America	
October 19	Dying Light: Platinum Edition	NS		Action-adventure, Survival horror	Techland		
October 19	Inscryption	WIN		Deck building (roguelike)	Daniel Mullins Games	Devolver Digital	
October 20	Corpse Party	WIN, NS, PS4, XBO		Survival horror	5pb.	GrindHouse	
October 20	Klang 2	WIN		Rhythm	Tinimations	Ratalaika Games	
October 21	Disciples: Liberation	WIN, PS4, PS5, XBO, XBX/S		TBS	Frima Studio	Kalypso Media	
October 21	Echo Generation	XBO, XBX/S		Action RPG	Cococucumber		
October 21	Evertried	NS		Strategy, Puzzle	Dangen Entertainment		
October 21	The Legend of Sword and Fairy 7	WIN		Action RPG	Softstar	CubeGame	
October 21	Skul: The Hero Slayer	NS, PS4, XBO		Roguelike, Action	SouthPAW Games	Neowiz	
October 21	Toy Soldiers HD	WIN, NS, PS4, XBO		Action, Strategy	Signal Studios	Accelerate Games	
October 22	Carrion	PS4		Horror	Phobia Game Studio	Devolver Digital	
October 22	The Dark Pictures Anthology: House of Ashes	WIN, PS4, PS5, XBO, XBX/S	Original	Interactive drama, Survival horror	Supermassive Games	Bandai Namco Entertainment	
October 22	My Friend Peppa Pig	WIN, NS, PS4, XBO, Stadia		Adventure	Petoons Studio	Outright Games	
October 25	Castlevania: Bloodlines	NS		Platformer			
October 25	Contra: Hard Corps	NS		Run and gun			
October 25	Dr. Mario 64	NS		Puzzle			
October 25	Dr. Robotnik's Mean Bean Machine	NS		Puzzle			
October 25	Ecco the Dolphin	NS		Action-adventure			
October 25	Golden Axe	NS		Brawler			
October 25	Gunstar Heroes	NS		Run and gun			
October 25	The Legend of Zelda: Ocarina of Time	NS		Action-adventure			
October 25	Mario Kart 64	NS		Racing (kart)			
October 25	Mario Tennis	NS		Sports			
October 25	MUSHA	NS		Scrolling shooter			
October 25	Phantasy Star IV	NS		RPG			
October 25	Puyo Puyo (JP)	NS		Puzzle			
October 25	Ristar	NS		Platformer			
October 25	Shining Force	NS		Tactical RPG			
October 25	Shinobi III: Return of the Ninja Master	NS		Hack and slash, Platformer			
October 25	Sin and Punishment	NS		Shoot 'em up (rail), Shooting gallery			
October 25	Sonic the Hedgehog 2	NS		Platformer			
October 25	Star Fox 64	NS		Shoot 'em up			
October 25	Streets of Rage 2	NS		Brawler			
October 25	Strider	NS		Hack and slash, Platformer			
October 25	Super Mario 64	NS		Platformer, Action-adventure			
October 25	WinBack	NS		TPS			
October 25	Yoshi's Story	NS		Platformer, Action-adventure			
October 26	Marvel's Guardians of the Galaxy	WIN, NS, PS4, PS5, XBO, XBX/S	Original	Action-adventure	Eidos-Montréal	Square Enix	
October 26	Iron Harvest Complete Edition	PS5, XBX/S		RTS	King Art Games	Deep Silver	
October 28	Age of Empires IV	WIN		RTS	Relic Entertainment	Xbox Game Studios	
October 28	Doctor Who: The Edge of Reality	WIN, NS, PS4, PS5, XBO, XBX/S		Adventure	Maze Theory	BBC Studios / Just Add Water	
October 28	Dusk	NS		FPS	New Blood Interactive		
October 28	Fatal Frame: Maiden of Black Water	WIN, NS, PS4, PS5, XBO, XBX/S		Survival horror	Koei Tecmo		
October 28	Happy Game	WIN, NS		Adventure, Horror	Amanita Design		
October 28	Riders Republic	WIN, PS4, PS5, XBO, XBX/S, Stadia		Sports	Ubisoft Annecy	Ubisoft	
October 28	Saint Kotar	WIN		Horror, Adventure	Red Martyr Entertainment	Soedesco	
October 28	Tails Noir	PS4, PS5, XBO, XBX/S		RPG, Adventure	EggNut	Raw Fury	
October 28	Undernauts: Labyrinth of Yomi	WIN, NS, PS4, XBO		RPG, Roguelike	Experience	Aksys Games	
October 28	Voice of Cards: The Isle Dragon Roars	WIN, NS, PS4		RPG	Alim	Square Enix	
October 29	Crab Game	WIN, OSX, LIN		Party	Dani		
October 29	Mario Party Superstars	NS		Party	NDcube	Nintendo	
November 2	Cupid Parasite	NS		Visual novel	Idea Factory		
November 2	Knockout City	PS5, XBX/S		Sports	Velan Studios	Electronic Arts	
November 2	Unpacking	WIN, OSX, LIN, NS, XBO		Puzzle	Witch Beam	Humble Bundle	
November 2	World War Z	NS		TPS	Saber Interactive	Mad Dog Games	
November 4	The Binding of Isaac: Repentance	NS, PS4, PS5		Roguelike	Nicalis		
November 4	A Boy and His Blob	NS		Puzzle-platformer	WayForward	Ziggurat Interactive	
November 4	Demon Turf	WIN, NS, PS4, PS5, XBO, XBX/S		Platformer	Fabraz	Playtonic Friends	
November 4	Just Dance 2022	NS, PS4, PS5, XBO, XBX/S, Stadia		Rhythm	Ubisoft Paris	Ubisoft	
November 4	Mr. Driller Drill Land	PS4, PS5, XBO, XBX/S		Puzzle	Bandai Namco Entertainment		
November 4	Tales of Luminaria	iOS, DROID		Action RPG	Bandai Namco Studios	Bandai Namco Entertainment	
November 4	Where Cards Fall	WIN, NS		Puzzle	The Game Band	Snowman	
November 5	Call of Duty: Vanguard	WIN, PS4, PS5, XBO, XBX/S	Original	FPS	Sledgehammer Games	Activision	
November 5	Fast & Furious: Spy Racers Rise of SH1FT3R	WIN, NS, PS4, XBO		Racing	3DClouds	Outright Games	
November 8	Blue Archive	iOS, DROID		Action RPG, Tactical RPG, RTS	Nexon Games		
November 9	Blue Reflection: Second Light	WIN, NS, PS4		RPG	Gust	Koei Tecmo	
November 9	Football Manager 2022	WIN, OSX, NS, XBO, XBX/S, iOS, DROID		Sports	Sports Interactive	Sega	
November 9	Forza Horizon 5	WIN, XBO, XBX/S		Racing	Playground Games	Xbox Game Studios	
November 9	Jurassic World Evolution 2	WIN, PS4, PS5, XBO, XBX/S		Business sim	Frontier Developments		
November 9	Tiny Tina's Assault on Dragon Keep: A Wonderlands One-Shot Adventure	WIN, PS4, PS5, XBO, XBX/S		Action RPG, FPS	Gearbox Software, Stray Kite Studios	2K Games	
November 9	Wingspan	DROID		Digital tabletop	Monster Couch	Monster Couch, Stonemaier Games	
November 10	Seven Knights 2 (WW)	iOS, DROID		MMORPG	Netmarble Nexus	Netmarble	
November 11	The Elder Scrolls V: Skyrim Anniversary Edition	WIN, PS4, PS5, XBO, XBX/S	Remaster	RPG	Bethesda Game Studios	Bethesda Softworks	
November 11	Grand Theft Auto: The Trilogy – The Definitive Edition	WIN, NS, PS4, PS5, XBO, XBX/S	Remaster + Compilation	Action-adventure	Grove Street Games	Rockstar Games	
November 11	PUBG: New State	iOS, DROID		Battle royale	PUBG Studio	Krafton	
November 11	Star Wars: Knights of the Old Republic	NS		RPG	Aspyr	Lucasfilm Games	
November 12	Shin Megami Tensei V	NS		RPG	Atlus		
November 16	Dysmantle	WIN, OSX	Original	Action RPG, Adventure, Survival	10tons	10tons	
November 16	Grow: Song of the Evertree	WIN, NS, PS4, XBO		Action-adventure	Prideful Sloth	505 Games	
November 16	Hextech Mayhem: A League of Legends Story	WIN, NS		Rhythm	Choice Provisions	Riot Forge	
November 16	The Last Stand: Aftermath	WIN, PS4, PS5, XBO, XBX/S		Survival, Roguelike	Con Artist Games	Armor Games	
November 16	Light Fairytale Episode II	PS4		RPG	neko works		
November 16	Ruined King: A League of Legends Story	WIN, NS, PS4, PS5, XBO, XBX/S		Tactical RPG	Airship Syndicate	Riot Forge	
November 16	Sherlock Holmes: Chapter One	WIN, PS5, XBX/S		Adventure	Frogwares		
November 16	Surviving the Aftermath	NS		Action-adventure	Iceflake Studios	Paradox Interactive	
November 16	The Waylanders	WIN		RPG	Gato Studio		
November 17	Final Fantasy VII: The First Soldier	iOS, DROID		TPS	Ateam Inc.	Square Enix	
November 17	Gunfire Reborn	WIN		Roguelike, FPS	Duoyi Games	Duoyi Games	
November 17	Klang 2	NS, PS4, PS5, XBO, XBX/S		Rhythm	Tinimations	Ratalaika Games	
November 18	Exo One	WIN, XBO, XBX/S		Adventure	Exbleative	Future Friends Games	
November 18	Kid A Mnesia Exhibition	WIN, OSX, PS5		Walking sim	Namethemachine, Arbitrarily Good Productions	Epic Games	
November 18	Microsoft Flight Simulator: Game of the Year Edition	WIN, XBX/S		Vehicle sim (plane)	Asobo Studio	Xbox Game Studios	
November 19	Battlefield 2042	WIN, PS4, PS5, XBO, XBX/S		FPS	DICE	Electronic Arts	
November 19	Pokémon Brilliant Diamond and Shining Pearl	NS		RPG	ILCA	The Pokémon Company / Nintendo	
November 21	Re:Legend	WIN, PS4, NS, XBO		RPG	Magnus Games Studio	505 Games	
November 23	Death's Door	NS, PS4, PS5		Action-adventure	Acid Nerve	Devolver Digital	
November 23	DEEEER Simulator	WIN		Sandbox, Action-adventure	Gibier Games	Playism	
November 30	Beyond a Steel Sky	NS, PS4, PS5, XBO, XBX/S		Adventure	Revolution Software	Microids	
November 30	Clockwork Aquario (JP)	NS, PS4		Action, Platformer	Westone	Strictly Limited Games	
November 30	Evil Genius 2: World Domination	PS4, PS5, XBO, XBX/S		RTS, Simulation	Rebellion Developments		
December 1	Propnight	WIN		Survival horror	Fntastic	Mytona	
December 2	Dairoku: Agents of Sakuratani	NS		Visual novel	Idea Factory	Aksys Games	
December 2	Fights in Tight Spaces	WIN, XBO, XBX/S		Deck building (roguelike)	Ground Shatter	Mode 7 Games	
December 2	Solar Ash	WIN, PS4, PS5		Action-adventure	Heart Machine	Annapurna Interactive	
December 3	Big Brain Academy: Brain vs. Brain	NS		Party, Puzzle	Nintendo EPD	Nintendo	
December 3	Chorus	WIN, PS4, PS5, XBO, XBX/S, Stadia		Vehicle sim (spaceship)	Fishlabs	Deep Silver	
December 3	Danganronpa Decadence	NS		Visual novel	Spike Chunsoft	Spike Chunsoft	
December 3	Disney Magical World 2: Enchanted Edition	NS		Life sim	Bandai Namco Studios, Hyde	Bandai Namco Entertainment	
December 3	Happy's Humble Burger Farm	WIN, PS4, PS5, XBO, XBX/S		Horror	Scythe Dev Team	tinyBuild	
December 3	Icarus	WIN		Survival	RocketWerkz		
December 5	Choro 2021	iOS, DROID		Action-adventure	Carl Zitelmann		
December 6	Shadow Tactics: Blades of the Shogun - Aiko's Choice	WIN, OSX, LIN		RTT	Mimimi Games	Daedalic Entertainment	
December 7	Final Fantasy XIV: Endwalker	WIN, OSX, PS4, PS5		MMO, RPG	Square Enix		
December 7	Life Is Strange: True Colors	NS	Port	Adventure	Deck Nine	Square Enix	
December 7	Rune Factory 4 Special	WIN, PS4, XBO		RPG	Hakama	Xseed Games	
December 7	Serious Sam 4	PS5, XBX/S		FPS	Croteam	Devolver Digital	
December 7	SpellForce 3 Reforced	WIN		RTS, RPG	Grimlore Games	THQ Nordic	
December 7	Twelve Minutes	NS, PS4, PS5		Adventure	Luis Antonio	Annapurna Interactive	
December 8	Halo Infinite	WIN, XBO, XBX/S	Original	FPS	343 Industries	Xbox Game Studios	
December 8	Sam & Max Beyond Time and Space Remastered	WIN, NS, XBO		Adventure	Skunkape Games		
December 9	GTFO	WIN		FPS, Survival horror	10 Chambers Collective		
December 9	Loop Hero	NS		Deck building (roguelike)	Four Quarters	Devolver Digital	
December 9	Monster Rancher 1 & 2 DX	WIN, NS, iOS		RPG	Koei Tecmo		
December 9	Suika Game (JP)	NS		Puzzle	Aladdin X		
December 10	Garage: Bad Dream Adventure	iOS, DROID		PCA	Sakuba Metal Works, SmokymonkeyS	Sakuba Metal Works	
December 10	Paper Mario	NS		RPG			
December 10	A Year Of Springs	NS, WIN, PS4, XBO, DROID		Visual novel	Npckc	Ratalaika Games	
December 11	The Legend of Nayuta: Boundless Trails (Note: Available worldwide; no English audio/dub, only Japanese.)	WIN		Action RPG, Hack and slash	Nihon Falcom, PH3 GmbH	NIS America	
December 13	Shovel Knight Pocket Dungeon	WIN, PS4, NS, OSX		Puzzle, Roguelike	Yacht Club Games		
December 14	Praey for the Gods	WIN, PS4, PS5, XBO		Action-adventure	No Matter Studios		
December 16	Alfred Hitchcock – Vertigo	WIN		Adventure	Pendulo Studios	Microids	
December 16	Alien: Isolation	iOS, DROID		Action-adventure, Stealth, Survival horror	Feral Interactive	Sega	
December 16	Altered Beast	NS		Brawler			
December 16	Dynamite Headdy	NS		Platformer			
December 16	Final Fantasy VII Remake Intergrade	WIN		Action RPG	Square Enix		
December 16	Five Nights at Freddy's: Security Breach	WIN, PS4, PS5		Survival horror	Steel Wool Studios	ScottGames	
December 16	The Gunk	WIN, XBO, XBX/S		Action-adventure	Image & Form	Thunderful	
December 16	Record of Lodoss War: Deedlit in Wonder Labyrinth	NS, PS4, PS5, XBO, XBX/S		Metroidvania	Team Ladybug, Why So Serious?	Playism	
December 16	SINce Memories: Off the Starry Sky (JP)	WIN		Visual novel	Mages		
December 16	Sword of Vermilion	NS		Action RPG			
December 16	Thunder Force II	NS		Scrolling shooter			
December 16	ToeJam & Earl	NS		Action, Roguelike			
December 17	Antimatter Dimensions	WIN, OSX		Incremental	Hevipelle		
December 17	Baldur's Gate: Dark Alliance	WIN, OSX, LIN		Action RPG	Black Isle Studios	Interplay Entertainment	
December 23	Dynasty Warriors 9: Empires (JP)	WIN, NS, PS4, PS5, XBO, XBX/S		Hack and slash	Omega Force	Koei Tecmo	
