= Paint the Town Red =

Paint the Town Red may refer to:

- Paint the Town Red, a 2003 compilation album by the Mahones
- "Paint the Town Red" (Delirious? song), 2005 from The Mission Bell
- "Paint the Town Red" (Doja Cat song), 2023 from Scarlet
- "Paint the Town Red", a song by the Mahones from The Black Irish, 2010
- "Vi maler byen rød" (We're Painting the Town Red), a song by Birthe Kjaer, 1989
- Paint the Town Red (video game), 2021 first-person combat video game

== See also ==
- Henry Beresford, 3rd Marquess of Waterford, whose actions some attribute as first use of the term "Paint the Town Red"
