= 10tons =

Finnish video game developer and publisher

- Native name: 10tons Oy
- Type: Private
- Industry: Video games
- Founded: 2003; 23 years ago
- Headquarters: Tampere, Finland
- Products: Video games
- Revenue: Approximately €2 million (2024)
- Number of employees: 14 (2024)
- Website: www.10tons.com

10tons Oy, doing business in English as 10tons Ltd., is a Finnish video game developer and publisher based in Tampere, Finland. The studio was founded in 2003 and is known for developing and publishing games for PC, mobile devices, and consoles. Its titles include Crimsonland, Neon Chrome, Jydge, Tesla vs Lovecraft, Undead Horde, and Dysmantle.

The studio describes itself as independent and self-funded, with revenue from earlier games used to finance later projects. In 2024, the Finnish Game Industry Report listed 10tons as having a core team of 14 people in Tampere, 2024 revenue of approximately €2 million, and profit of approximately €1 million.

== History ==
10tons was founded in 2003 by a group of university students in Tampere, Finland. The company's first commercial game was Crimsonland, a top-down shooter released under a distribution agreement with California-based Reflexive Entertainment.

According to the studio's presskit, 10tons was founded as digital distribution was beginning to gain traction, and the founders wanted to determine whether they could succeed by making digitally distributed games. The company later created the MythPeople brand for casual games and released several PC and Mac titles during the following years.

In a 2017 interview, 10tons described its business as multiplatform rather than mobile-focused, noting that the company had developed PC and Mac games for years before expanding to iPhone in 2008 and Android in 2011. By the late 2010s, the company was regularly releasing games across desktop, console, and mobile platforms.

== Development approach ==
10tons develops and publishes its own games and has described itself as fully self-funded. The company uses in-house multiplatform technology for its games, a detail also listed in Play Finland and the Finnish Game Industry Report studio profiles.

The studio's catalogue includes casual puzzle games, top-down shooters, roguelites, action role-playing games, and open-world survival-crafting games. 10tons has often reused and expanded design elements across related titles. Jydge, for example, was announced as a top-down shooter set in the same universe as Neon Chrome.

== Games ==
Year	Title	Notes
2003	Crimsonland	The studio's first commercial game; later remastered and re-released in 2014.
2012	King Oddball	Physics-based puzzle game developed and published by 10tons.
2016	Neon Chrome	Cyberpunk-themed roguelite twin-stick shooter.
2017	Time Recoil	Top-down shooter built around slow-motion combat mechanics.
2017	Jydge	Twin-stick shooter set in the same universe as Neon Chrome.
2018	Tesla vs Lovecraft	Twin-stick arena shooter featuring Nikola Tesla and H. P. Lovecraft-inspired enemies.
2019	Undead Horde	Necromancer-themed action game with role-playing, strategy, and hack-and-slash elements.
2020	Tesla Force	Roguelite top-down shooter and follow-up to Tesla vs Lovecraft.
2021	Skeletal Avenger	Roguelite dungeon-crawling hack-and-slash game.
2021	Dysmantle	Open-world post-apocalyptic action role-playing and survival-crafting game.
2022	Undead Horde 2: Necropolis	Sequel to Undead Horde.
2026	Dysplaced	Open-world survival-crafting game released in early access.

== Reception and impact ==
Several 10tons games have received coverage from video game publications. Crimsonland, originally released in 2003 and later updated for PlayStation 4 and other platforms, was reviewed by Game Informer in 2014. The review described the core twin-stick shooting as enjoyable while criticizing the game's presentation and visual design.

Jydge received generally favorable reviews according to Metacritic, with critics noting its customization systems and replay-focused mission structure. Dysmantle became one of the studio's most commercially successful games. In May 2025, PCGamesInsider.biz reported that the game had sold more than two million copies across all platforms.
