= Undermine =

Undermine or Undermining can refer to:

- The military practice of mining a fortification
- UnderMine, a roguelike indie video game
- Undermine (Transformers), a Transformers character
- Undermine (Warcraft), a fictional location in Warcraft
- Undermining (chess), a chess tactic in which a defensive piece is captured
- Social undermining, the opposite of social support
- A song from the American television series Nashville

== See also ==
- Undermind (album), by American rock band Phish
- Undermind (TV series)
- Underminded, an American hardcore punk band
- Underminer, a character and antagonist from the 2004 Disney/Pixar animated film The Incredibles
