= Jydge =

2017 twin-stick shooter video game

- Developer: 10tons
- Publisher: 10tons
- Platforms: Android; iOS; Linux; macOS; Microsoft Windows; Nintendo Switch; PlayStation 4; PlayStation 5; Xbox One
- Release: PlayStation 4; 3 October 2017; Linux, macOS, Windows; 4 October 2017; Xbox One; 6 October 2017; Switch; 19 October 2017; PlayStation 5; 19 November 2020
- Genre: Twin-stick shooter
- Modes: Single-player, multiplayer

Jydge (/dʒʌdʒ/ JUJ, "judge") is a twin-stick shooter video game developed and published by 10tons. It is a prequel to and spin-off from Neon Chrome. Players assume the role of the JYDGE—a law enforcer who must cleanse a dystopic, cyberpunk city of crime, inspired by RoboCop and the comic Judge Dredd. The game was released in October 2017.

== Gameplay ==
Jydge is a twin-stick shooter video game played from a tilted top-down perspective. Set in the dystopic, cyberpunk city of Edenbyrg, players take control of the "JYDGE"—a law enforcer who is tasked with eliminating enemies and rescuing hostages across twenty different levels. The game features destructible environments that enable players to breach a room by shooting down a wall. Between levels, players can upgrade and customise JYDGE using credits obtained whilst playing through a level. New upgrades are unlocked by earning medals from completing specific objectives and tasks during a level. The game can be played alone or in a two-player cooperative gameplay mode.

== Development and release ==
Jydge was developed by 10tons. The game is a prequel and spin-off to 10tons' previous game Neon Chrome and was developed using the same game engine as the aforementioned title. The game was announced in May 2017. The game reuses art assets from Neon Chrome, however the developers opted to create preset levels rather than use procedural generation as in Neon Chrome. 10tons also reduced the speed of projectiles fired by enemies to make fights more manageable.

Jydge was released for PlayStation 4 on 3 October 2017, for Linux, macOS and Windows on 4 October, for Xbox One on 6 October, and for Nintendo Switch on 19 October. It was later released for PlayStation 5 on 19 November 2020 with cross-buy support for the PlayStation platform.

== Reception ==
Reception

Aggregate score
| Aggregator | Score |
|---|---|
| Metacritic | PS4: 76/100; PC: 81/100; XONE: 76/100; NS: 67/100 iOS: 78/100 |

Review scores
| Publication | Score |
|---|---|
| Nintendo Life | NS: 5/10 |
| Nintendo World Report | NS: 6.5/10 |
| Pocket Gamer | NS: 7/10 |
| Push Square | PS4: 7/10 |
| TouchArcade | iOS: 4.5/5 |

Jydge received "generally favorable" reviews from professional critics according to review aggregator website Metacritic, although reaction towards the Nintendo Switch version was more mixed.

Nintendo Life reviewer Liam Doolan criticised the game's controls, which he thought were imprecise. He also felt that the futuristic theme was mundane. Writing for Nintendo World Report, Casey Gibson enjoyed the large amount of customisation but believed that the system was held back by challenging progression system that required too much grinding and replaying of missions. Simon Fitzgerald of Push Square and Jon Mundy of Pocket Gamer also took issue with being forced to replay levels to unlock further levels. Fitzgerald found the destructible environments to be an enjoyable aspect of the gameplay. John Walker of Rock, Paper, Shotgun found the gameplay to be fun and enjoyed being given tasks to complete during the levels.
