= Epic Games Store =

Digital video game storefront

- The storefront in November 2025
- Developer: Epic Games
- Release: December 6, 2018; 7 years ago
- Operating system: Microsoft Windows; macOS; Android; iOS
- Available in: 32 languages
- List of languages Arabic, Bulgarian, Chinese (Simplified), Chinese (Traditional), Czech, Danish, Dutch, Filipino, Finnish, French, English, German, Hindi, Hungarian, Indonesian, Italian, Japanese, Korean, Malay, Norwegian, Polish, Portuguese (Brazil), Portuguese (Portugal), Romanian, Russian, Spanish (Latin America), Spanish (Spain), Swedish, Thai, Turkish, Ukrainian, Vietnamese
- Type: Content delivery
- License: Proprietary software
- Website: store.epicgames.com

The Epic Games Store is a video game digital distribution service and storefront operated by Epic Games. It launched in December 2018 as a software client, for Microsoft Windows and macOS, and online storefront. Android and iOS versions of the store launched in August 2024, with the iOS version only available for European users. The service provides friends list management, game matchmaking, and other features. Epic Games has further plans to expand the feature set of the storefront but it does not plan to add as many features as other digital distribution platforms, such as discussion boards or user reviews, instead using existing social media platforms to support these.

Epic began offering digital distribution for game publishers after the success of Fortnite, released in 2017, which Epic distributed using their own software channels to players on Windows and macOS systems. Tim Sweeney, founder and CEO of Epic Games, stated in August 2017 that the revenue cut of Steam, the dominant game storefront from Valve, was unreasonably high at 30%, and suggested that they could run a profitable store with as little as an 8% cut. By launch, Epic Games had settled on a 12% revenue cut for titles published through the store, as well as dropping the licensing fees for games built on their Unreal Engine, normally 5% of the revenue.

Epic Games enticed developers and publishers to the service by offering them time-exclusivity agreements to publish on the storefront, in exchange for guaranteed minimum revenue. Epic also offers users one or two free games each week to help draw users. Criticism from users has been drawn to Epic Games and those developers and publishers opting for exclusivity deals, asserting that these are segmenting the market.

== Storefront and software ==
The Epic Games Store is a storefront for games available via the web and built into Epic Games' launcher application. Both web and application allow players to purchase games, while through the launcher the player can install and keep their games up to date.

Epic's newer games will be exclusively available through its store and the company plans to fund developers to release exclusively through their store, using revenue guarantees to developers that opt for this, with Epic paying the difference should a game underperform. For other developers, Epic takes a 12% share of revenue, the rest going to the developer, and for any games developed using Unreal Engine, Epic forgoes the 5% revenue-based fee for those games sold through their storefront. After paying for content delivery and other services, Epic's profit is about 5% of gross revenue, though, with economies of scale, this could increase to 6–7%. By Epic's calculations, the storefront's commission was sufficient to be profitable. Starting in June 2025, Epic will not take any revenue cut for a game with under $1 million in sales, after which it will take its normal 12% cut on further sales.

Epic planned to offer one free game every two weeks through 2019; this was increased to one free game every week in June 2019, and on weeks where the free game had a mature content rating and thus locked out if parental controls are enabled, Epic offered a second free game not so rated. Epic since affirmed that they planned to continue the free game program through 2021, and 2022. Later, it was announced the program would continue "through 2023 and beyond." Through the first eighteen months of this program, Epic had given out over two thousand dollars of games, as estimated by PCGamesN. Certain free game offerings had been highly popular; in its giveaway for Grand Theft Auto V in May 2020, more than seven millions new users claimed the giveaway in addition to existing ones, and temporarily crashed Epic's servers, and later, over 19 million users obtained a free copy of Star Wars Battlefront II offered in January 2021, with the new influx of players crashing the game's servers briefly. Documents unveiled during the Epic Games v. Apple trial in 2021 showed that in the store's giveaways prior to 2020, Epic paid buyouts to the developers of the free game ranging typically from $100,000 to $1 million, and measured this performance in new users drawn to the storefront on the order of 100,000 new users, with that buyout averaging from $0.50 to 5.00 per new user. Epic Games also has offered sales, in which Epic absorbs the discount from the sale. For example, its first store-wide sale in May 2019 offered a discount of US$10 off any game valued at US$15 or more.

The store at launch had a barebones set of features, but Epic plans to develop feature subsets comparable to other digital storefronts. Eventually, the storefront will offer user reviews, but this feature will be opt-in by developers to avoid misuse by activities like review bombing. Cloud saving was added in August 2019, while preliminary support for achievements and user modifications were added in July 2020. Full support for achievements were rolled out in October 2021. There are no plans to include internal user forums. The storefront will include a ticket-based support system for users to report bugs and technical problems for games to developers, while developers will be encouraged to link to external forums and social channels of their choosing, like Reddit and Discord, in lieu of storefront-tied forums. However, a party chat system, similar to features of Discord, will be implemented in 2021 to allow friends to chat while in games supported by the store. Information taken from OpenCritic was added to product Store pages in January 2020 to provide users with critical review information. The store added a review system in June 2022, and as to fight review bombing, the system is based on randomized polling of users, and with presentation of random subsets of these reviews to storefront pages.

The store does not have features such as virtual reality headset support, nor is expected to have any "game-shaped features" similar to Steam's trading cards designed to drive sales.

Cloud saving was introduced on a very limited, game-by-game basis in July 2019, though Epic plans to expand this out after validating the feature. In December 2019, Epic gave developers and publishers the option to implement their own in-game storefront for microtransactions and other purchases for a game, while still retaining the option to use the Epic storefront instead.

Where possible, Epic plans to extend its "Support a Creator" program that it had launched in Fortnite Battle Royale to other games offered on the store. With the Support a Creator program, players can opt to indicate a streamer or content creator, selected by Epic based on submitted applications, to support. Supported streamers then receive revenue from Epic Games on microtransactions made through the Epic Games Store from the players that supported them, incentivizing these content creators; within Fortnite, creators had received about 5% of the cash value of the microtransactions.

Following developers discovering that Valve would not allow games on Steam that used blockchain-based elements like cryptocurrency or non-fungible tokens as these items have value outside of Steam, Epic announced that they would allow such games, though this remains part of the review of each game that Epic performs before accepting a game onto its system.

== History ==
Digital distribution of games for personal computers prior to the introduction of the Epic Games Store was through digital storefronts like Steam and GOG.com, with Steam being the dominant channel with an estimated 75% of all digital distribution in 2013. Valve, which operated Steam, took a 30% revenue cut of all games sold through their services, a figure matched by the other services like GOG.com, and console and mobile storefronts. In August 2017, Epic's Tim Sweeney suggested that 30% was no longer a reasonable cut, and that Valve could still profit if they cut their revenue share to 8%.

In early December 2018, Epic Games announced that it would open a digital storefront to challenge Steam by using a 12% revenue split rather than Steam's 30%. Epic also said that it would not impose digital rights management (DRM) restrictions on games sold through its platform. The store opened days later, on December 6, 2018, as part of the Game Awards, with a handful of games and a short list of upcoming titles. The store was open for macOS and Windows platforms before expanding to Android and other platforms. Epic aims to release a storefront for Android devices, bypassing the Google Play Store, where it will similarly only take a 12% cut compared to Google's 30%. While Apple, Inc.'s monopoly on iOS currently makes it impossible for Epic to release an App Store there, analysts believe that if Google reacts to Epic's App Store by reducing their cut, Apple will be pressured to follow suit. Epic has tried to ask Google for an exemption to bypass Google's payment systems for in-app purchases for the Fortnite Battle Royale app, but Google has refused to allow this.

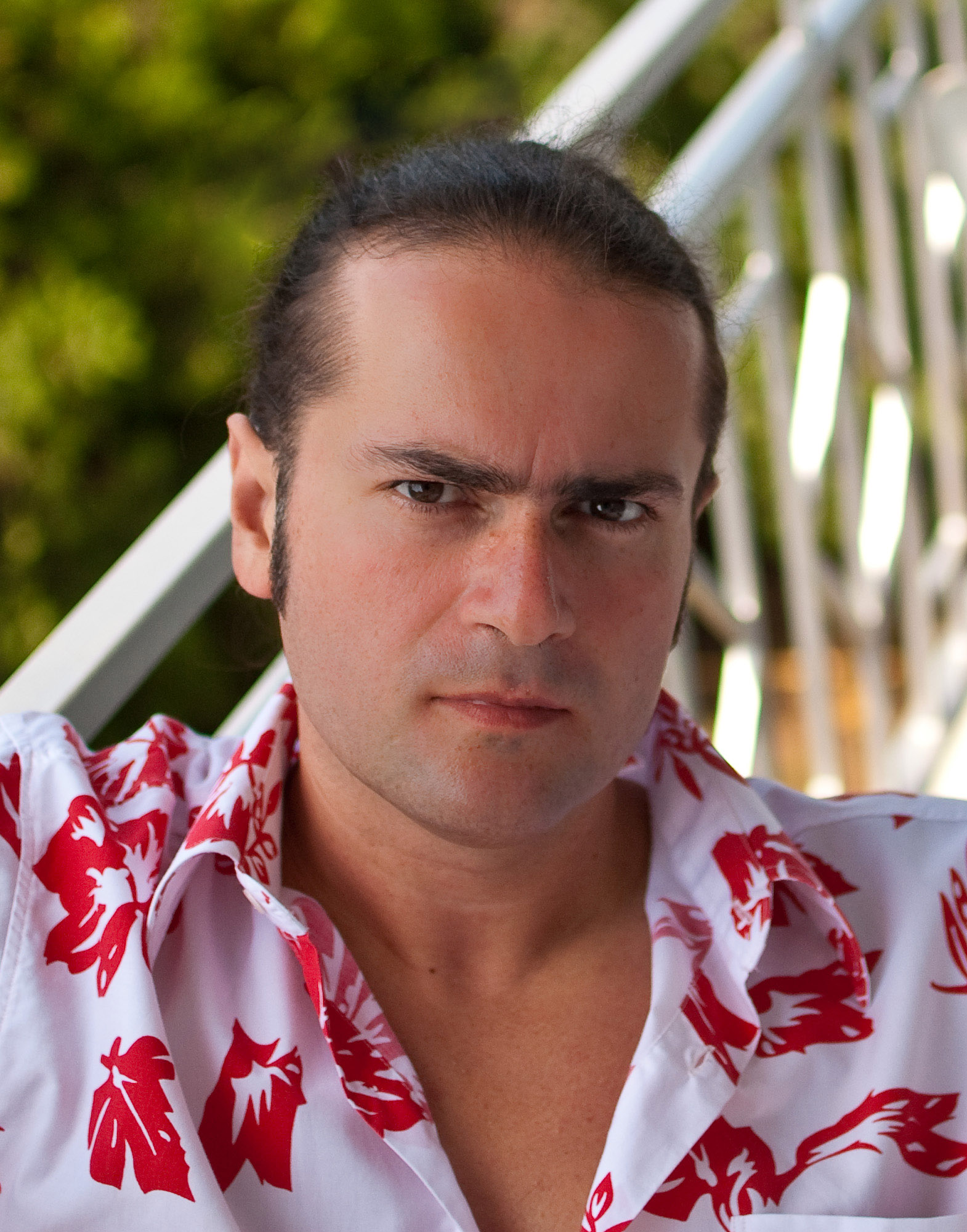
Sergiy Galyonkin, the store's former director of publishing strategy

Prior to the store's launch, its Director of Publishing Strategy at the time, Sergiy Galyonkin, had run Steam Spy, a website that collected Steam usage data from public profiles to create public sales statistics. He ran the site as a side-project but used it to learn what developers would want from Epic's store, namely fewer social elements and less visual clutter. The store's contents were hand-curated until Epic opened the store to self-publishing, starting with a beta of these features in August 2021. Epic's staff will still need to approve games for the store, a process that "mostly focus[es] on the technical side of things and general quality", according to Tim Sweeney. Sweeney does not expect this vetting process to be as stringent as the approvals needed to publish games on home video game consoles, but will use human evaluation to filter out bloatware and asset flips, among other poor-quality titles. Epic does not plan to allow adults-only mature content on the store.

In January 2019, Ubisoft announced its plans to distribute its games via the Epic Games Store, with its upcoming Tom Clancy's The Division 2 to be sold on the storefront (in addition to Ubisoft's own Uplay storefront) instead of Steam, making it the first major third-party publisher to utilize the Epic Games Store. Ubisoft said that selecting the Epic Games Store for future games was part of a larger business discussion related to Steam. Chris Early, Ubisoft's vice president for partnerships and revenue, described Steam as "unrealistic, the current business model that they have...It doesn't reflect where the world is today in terms of game distribution." Publisher Deep Silver followed suit later that month, announcing that Metro Exodus will be exclusive to Epic Games Store for one year, at a reduced US$50 (in North America) compared to US$60 when it was offered on other storefronts. Epic has subsequently made partnerships with Private Division and Quantic Dream for publishing on the store.

The storefront started offering non-game applications in December 2020 with the introduction of Spotify; Epic stated that it will not take a cut of any of Spotify's subscriptions for those using it via its storefront app. Other apps added included itch.io, iHeartRadio, Krita, and Brave.

Epic introduced cabined accounts intended for children in December 2022. These accounts have access to certain free games on the store, including Fortnite, Fall Guys, and Rocket League with limited gameplay features to provide a safe environment for children. These accounts also cannot purchase games without the authority of a parent's approval, as well as other parental controls.

Epic added self-publishing options to the store in March 2023. Similar to Steam Direct, a developer pays $100 to list their game. Epic does some minimum oversight of these games, disallowing pornographic titles and those with multiplayer but lacking cross-platform play support for the game on other storefronts. In May, Epic announced a reward program in which users can earn 5% in currency for eligible purchases. A First Run Program, offering developers to waive Epic's revenue share during 6 months store exclusivity, was announced on August 23, 2023. Additionally, a Now on Epic program, offering developers the same conditions for previously released games, was announced on October 16, 2023.

Epic launched the storefront for on Android devices worldwide and for iOS-based devices for European users on August 16, 2024. This had followed from the European Union's evaluation of Apple, Inc.'s practices against alternative storefronts and anti-steering policies under the Digital Markets Act; in response, Apple allowed for alternative storefronts to be used in their devices within Europe. With the store's availability on mobile devices, Epic began offering third-party games in January 2025, as well as making games available for free for limited times similar to the desktop store offering. Because of Apple's restrictions on sales of games for iOS through other storefronts, Epic has offered to pay the penalty for those developers and publishers whose games they offer for free or a discount via the mobile storefront.

In April 2025, the judge in the Epic Games v. Apple lawsuit had found Apple to be willfully violating the terms of the prior injunction, and ruled that the company could no longer restrict third-party storefronts, collect fees from these, or require interface elements that aimed to dissuade users from using third-party storefronts. Sweeney stated that within a week of the ruling, in early May, Epic plans to bring the Epic Games Store to iOS in the U.S. Further, Epic announced plans to give developers the ability to open their own web shops as third party marketplaces to avoid app store fees. On May 13, Epic temporarily increased the rewards program percentage on the store from 5% to 20% until August 31.

Prior to October 2026, the launcher had been criticized for its slow responsiveness. Epic Games Store vice president and general manager Steven Allison conceded in February 2026 that "the launcher sucks" and promised improvements to speed and responsiveness. During Epic's 2026 Unreal Fest in June, the company announced plans for improvements to the storefront, including restructuring the application's architecture to improve speed and improved downloading rates. Epic Games unveiled a beta version for a new launcher on October 14, claiming to be 46% faster than the Steam storefront launcher and "30 times faster [than the previous launcher]" and faster than Steam as well. This version was released a few days after a Bloomberg report on Epic turning to use automated AI tools for an upcoming Star Wars and Marvel game, with Epic stating the new launcher was completely rebuilt using vibe coding AI tools to match its previous functionality but improve its speed, though they anticipated the beta version would require significant bug fixing.

== Reception ==
The Epic Games Store was announced a few days after Valve had revealed a change in the Steam revenue sharing model that reduced Valve's take, reducing their revenue cut from 30% to 25% after a game made more than US$10 million, and to 20% after US$50 million. Several indie game developers expressed concern that this change was meant to help keep larger AAA developers and publishers and did little to support smaller developers. As such, when the Epic Games Store was announced, several journalists saw it as potentially disruptive to Steam's current model. Some developers and publishers have announced plans to release games that they were planning to release through Steam now exclusively through the Epic Games Store, or to have timed exclusivity on Epic's storefront before appearing on other services. Valve's Gabe Newell welcomed the competition, saying it "is awesome for everybody. It keeps us honest, it keeps everybody else honest", but did comment that, in the short-term, the competition was "ugly".

Over its first year in 2019, Epic reported that the Store drew 108 million customers and brought in over US$680 million in sales, with US$251 million being spent on third-party games. Of those third-party games, 90% of the sales came from the Epic Games Store's time-limited exclusives. Overall, Epic stated that overall sales were 60% higher than they had anticipated. For 2020, Epic stated the store had reached 160 million players, 31 million daily active players, and annual sales over US$700 million (US$265 million of that for third-party titles). According to data collected by Simon Carless in 2021, of the first wave of Epic storefront-exclusive games in 2019, only Satisfactory had surpassed what Epic paid for that exclusivity, and it along with Dauntless are the only two games expected to make a profit for Epic.

By 2023, total revenue from the store was $950 million, with 270 million users.

=== Reactions to storefront exclusivity ===
To compete against Steam, Epic Games has frequently arranged for time-exclusive releases of games on the Epic Games Store before other storefronts, typically for either six months or a year. Sweeney stated that this strategy was the only way to challenge Steam's dominant position, and would stop seeking exclusivity should Valve reduce its 30% revenue share. Otherwise, Epic will continue to accept offers for exclusivity on the Epic Games Store from any developers or publishers that are interested, regardless of what prior plans they had made with Steam or other storefronts.

Some consumers have reacted negatively towards these exclusivity deals, as it appears to create division in the gaming community similar to games that are released with timed exclusivity on home consoles. Metro Exodus, by developers 4A Games and published by Deep Silver, had been planned as a Steam release. However, Deep Silver announced a few weeks before release that the game would be a timed-exclusive on the Epic Games Store, eventually available on Steam a year after release. Some users were upset by this, review bombing the game on Steam and complaining at 4A Games. Deep Silver backed up 4A Games, and noted the decision for Epic Games Store exclusivity was made by Deep Silver's parent, Koch Media. In the days that followed after Metro Exodus' release, players used the Steam review system to praise the game as Epic Games Store lacked user reviews at that time. Phoenix Point, a spiritual successor to X-COM by X-COM's lead designer Julian Gollop, was successfully crowdfunded with players given the option of redemption keys on Steam or GOG.com. In March 2019, Gollop announced that they have opted to make Phoenix Point exclusive to the Epic Games Store for a year; backers would get a redemption key for the Epic Games Store as well as for Steam or GOG a year later when the exclusivity period was up, as well as being provided the first year's downloadable content for free. Gollop explained that with the exclusivity deal, his team received additional financial support to finish up Phoenix Point. Several backers were angered by this decision, believing that Gollop's team used their funds to get the game to a point where they could get external investment and then change the direction of the game. Gollop asserted that the deal with Epic Games did not alter Phoenix Point's ultimate direction, but did offer full refunds to backers if they wanted.

Glumberland, the developers of Ooblets, announced that the game would be exclusive to the Epic Games Store in late July 2019, citing that Epic's funding support would help to keep the studio afloat until release and provide them a better revenue split. In the announcement by Glumberland's Ben Wasser, he included what he felt had been joking language related to criticisms of Epic Games Store exclusivity, calling those who complained "immature, toxic gamers", but that the situation was "nothing to get worked up about". In the wake of this, Wasser and others at Glumberland began to receive thousands of hostile negative messages related to the announcement, including threats. Wasser had not expected the community to react to the message that way, and tried to clarify Glumberland's position of needing Epic's support rather than any attempt to spurn the gaming community. Sweeney spoke later that the campaign against Ooblets represents a growing trend in the community based on "the coordinated and deliberate creation and promotion of false information, including fake screenshots, videos, and technical analysis, accompanied by harassment of partners, promotion of hateful themes, and intimidation of those with opposing views." Sweeney said that Epic is working with its partners and developers to try to improve the situation and support those targeted in such manners.

Further issues on exclusivity arose after Unfold Games, who were in the final stages of preparing to release their game Darq, reported on their interactions with Epic Games. Darq had been established as a Steam release for several months and the developers announced that they were nearing release in 2019. According to Unfold Games, Epic Games approached them about having the game on the Epic Games Store in addition to providing funding support. However, when asked, Epic Games clarified that Unfold would have to sell the game on the Epic Games Store exclusively, having to withdraw the game from Steam for a period of one year. Unfold decided against going with Epic Games, noting that a large part of their marketing for fundraising was a major emphasis on releasing on Steam, as well as due to the game having been wishlisted by a large number of Steam users. As a result of media attention regarding Epic Games Store, Unfold released Darq as a digital rights management-free game on Steam and GOG.com. Some journalists have expressed concern that Epic's large focus on exclusivity may harm their intent.

Following a number of other time-exclusive planned releases on the Epic Games Store announced during the 2019 Game Developers Conference and further complaints from players about this, Steve Allison, head of the storefront division, admitted that they did not want to cause such disruption in the gaming community. According to Allison, they will try to avoid making such large-scale exclusivity deals so close to a game's release and want to try to respect what the community wants. Following similar complaints from backers of Shenmue III who were upset about the Steam release being delayed, Epic Games announced that with Shenmue III and any future crowd-funded game that ends up with Epic Games Store exclusivity, it will cover the costs of any refund requests from backers.

=== Other criticisms ===
In April 2021 in the Epic Games v. Apple lawsuit, Apple submitted a court filing that claimed that the Epic Games Store was running at a significant loss and likely would not be profitable until 2027, based on deposition from Epic's financial management, and thus requiring Epic to assure revenue from its other product streams. Apple asserted that Epic had lost around $400 million on the store from 2019 to 2020, primarily due to the minimum guarantees it provides to developers for bringing their game to the store and from its storefront exclusivity deals. In its response to Apple's claim, Epic stated it expected the Epic Games Store to become profitable by 2023 and that it was not yet profitable "because it has front-loaded its marketing and user-acquisition costs to gain market share". Sweeney, in response to this claim via Twitter, stated that the store "has proven to be a fantastic success in reaching gamers with great games and a fantastic investment into growing the business".

In March 2021, PC Gamer discovered that on select laptop configurations Epic Games Store could shorten battery lifespan by up to 20% even when it was not used (Epic Games Store window was closed and application was minimized to tray). On most devices, this impact was milder, at only 5%. Epic Games has addressed the issue with a patch.
