= Darq =

2019 video game

- Developer: Unfold Games
- Publisher: Feardemic
- Director: Wlad Marhulets
- Engine: Unity
- Platforms: Windows; PlayStation 4; Xbox One; Nintendo Switch; PlayStation 5; Xbox Series X/S
- Release: August 15, 2019: Windows; August 15, 2019; Complete Edition; PlayStation 4, Windows, Xbox One; December 4, 2020; Nintendo Switch; March 18, 2021; PlayStation 5, Xbox Series X/S; March 25, 2021
- Genres: Puzzle, stealth
- Mode: Single-player

Darq (stylized as DARQ) is a puzzle-platform adventure game developed by independent studio Unfold Games. Marketed as a psychological horror game, Darq follows a boy named Lloyd, who is trapped in a lucid dream state, as he manipulates the physics system which governs his dream world in order to solve puzzles and evade enemies. The game was initially released for Microsoft Windows on August 15, 2019. An updated version of the game titled Darq: Complete Edition, which collects the base game and all downloadable content, was released for PlayStation 4, Xbox One, and PC on December 4, 2020, and ported for multiple console platforms in March 2021.

Prior to the game's release, Darq gained significant media attention following public disclosure by Unfold Games founder Wlad Marhulets that he had rejected numerous offers from several publishers as well as an exclusivity deal with the Epic Games Store. Darq received mixed or average reviews on PC and PlayStation 5, whereas the Nintendo Switch version received a more favorable reception.

== Gameplay ==
Darq is presented as a 2D side-scroller with greyscale graphics, and is predominantly accompanied by minimalist ambient sounds. The player controls Lloyd throughout the game, which is set in a "zero-gravity lucid dream". He can walk left or right, and interact with environmental features like picking up objects or climbing through gaps. A key gameplay mechanic is the ability to change Lloyd's perspective or his surroundings as part of the solution for the game's many puzzles. To accomplish this, Lloyd may walk on an adjacent wall, or pull a relevant lever. Lloyd has no means of defending himself: he must sneak past or outrun enemies, often by taking advantage of the physics system that governs his dream world.

An upgraded and expanded version called Darq: Complete Edition includes two additional levels, “The Tower” and “The Crypt”. Both levels introduced new gameplay mechanics, achievements, and puzzles which are more challenging than gameplay content found in the base game.

== Development and release ==
Darq was developed by Unfold Games, an independent studio founded by professional composer Wlad Marhulets. Development for the project began in 2015, when Marhulets downloaded a copy of the Unity game engine and decided to learn more about computer programming and the creation of 3D models during his spare time. Marhulets eventually produced an experimental demo which contained about 2 to 3 minutes of gameplay time, and was persuaded by a friend to create a teaser trailer for his hobby project and upload it to the Steam Greenlight project. It ended up garnering almost 2,000 endorsements from Steam service users and became one of the top 10 most upvoted games within two weeks, along with positive assessments from critics. Encouraged by the positive reception, Marhulets decided to develop Darq into a commercial product and undertake video game development work on a full-time basis. Marhulets initially sought funding through the American crowdfunding website Indiegogo and set a goal for $20,000, which he claimed is "the minimum amount" he needed in order to complete the game's development.

Marhulets envisioned Darq as a "musically charged experience", with a "slow build and creepy atmosphere" akin to the pacing of Stanley Kubrick's The Shining. A number of gameplay features were announced throughout the game's development cycle which are not present in the final release of Darq. For example, parts of the dream world were supposed to be completely obscured in darkness, and Lloyd was supposed to have access to a flashlight. This meant that players would have relied on sound effects and Lloyd's flashlight while navigating him through obstacles, and in the same vein, the enemies Lloyd encounters would respond to his presence through sensations of light and sound. Another promised feature which is not included in the final release of Darq include procedurally generated elements like enemy locations. By June 2018, the game's art style had changed significantly and Lloyd's facial features have been redesigned, though the final version of the character wears the same horizontally-striped shirt. Lloyd's shirt, inspired by characters depicted in films by Tim Burton who often wear striped clothing, and slender frame is intended to evoke a skeletal aesthetic for the character.

In August 2019, Marhulets claimed on a Reddit post that he had rejected twelve offers from major publishers for Darq as they contained terms he deemed unfavorable, with some publishers wanting up to an 80% cut of the profits as well as rights to the intellectual property of Darq. Marhulets eventually accepted a publishing offer from Feardemic, a subsidiary of Bloober Team SA, as the game's publisher. Marhulets also disclosed that an Epic Games representative approached him about an exclusivity deal for the Epic Games Store, three days after a promotional trailer was released which revealed the Steam launch date for Darq, where Epic would provide funding support on the condition that Darq was to be withdrawn from being sold on Steam for a period of one year. Marhulets declined the offer as he felt that withdrawing the game from a Steam launch soon after announcing its impending arrival on the service would damage the credibility of his studio, because an important aspect of the fundraising efforts for Darq was a pledge for its release on Steam, and that the game was apparently wishlisted by a large number of Steam users. Marhulet's post on the gaming subreddit went on to hit the front page, and subsequently settled among Reddit's most upvoted posts of all time.

Darq was released as a digital rights management-free game on Steam and GOG.com on August 15, 2019. On August 25, 2019, Marhulets announced that additional levels would be released later in 2019 as free downloadable content (DLC). Darq: Complete Edition, which includes the base game and all DLC, was released on December 4, 2020, for Xbox One, PlayStation 4 and PC storefronts. Owners of the original PC version of Darq received a free upgrade to the Complete Edition following its launch. Darq: Complete Edition was released on March 18, 2021, for the Nintendo Switch, and on March 25, 2021, for PlayStation 5 and Xbox Series X with free upgrades for owners of the prior console generation versions of the game. Although Darq was initially denied a store spot following the breakdown of negotiations between Epic Games and Unfold Games in 2019, Darq: The Complete Edition was eventually released on the Epic Games Store on October 28, 2021, where it was offered as a complimentary download for one week upon its debut. The payout from Epic Games to Unfold Games for the giveaway would help fund the studio's next project, which is said to be much larger in scope than Darq. Marhulets announced that he intended to donate all sales revenue for Darq generated through the Epic Games Store to charitable organizations such as the Gamers Outreach Foundation.

Marhulets authored a book titled GAMEDEV: 10 Steps to Making Your First Game Successful, published in June 2020, which details his experiences developing Darq. Marhulets also worked on a comic book adaptation of Darq, which was intended for release in late 2021.

== Reception ==
Reception

Aggregate score
Aggregator	Score
Metacritic	(PC) 70/100 (PS5) 74/100 (Switch) 76/100

Review scores
Publication	Score
Adventure Gamers	7/10
GameSpot	7/10
IGN	7.5/10
Cubed3	7/10
Multiplayer.it	7.8
Softpedia	7/10

Darq attracted media coverage from video game journalists prior to its release. Rock, Paper, Shotgun staff were intrigued by the game's premise, though Adam Smith said the game's flexible funding Indiegogo campaign made him somewhat uneasy in ways which are not related to its setting, while Matt Cox expressed concerns that the game's revamped art style as of 2017 seemingly leaned on mechanical allegory for Nazi war crimes and references to The Holocaust "as a cheap way of unsettling people". Austin Wood from PC Gamer praised the "remarkable depth" Darq achieved through "creative lighting and a thickly detailed foreground", as well as the sense of weight to its physics system. He lauded preview footage for Darq as "pure, helpless horror, and a great showing for a promising game".

Dustin Bailey from PCGamesN noted that Darq attracted "broadly positive reviews from both critics and Steam users" following its launch, and that Marhulet's disclosure of his dealings with publishers generated a level of fame for Darq. According to review aggregator Metacritic, Darq was generally well received on the Nintendo Switch, whereas the PlayStation 5 and PC versions were met with mixed or average reviews.
