= Where's Samantha? =

- Developer(s): Respect Studios
- Publisher(s): ROKiT Games Limited, ROKiT
- Engine: Unity
- Platform(s): Nintendo Switch, Microsoft Windows, macOS
- Release: 24 March 2021
- Genre(s): Puzzle, platform
- Mode(s): single-player

Where's Samantha? is 2021 a physics-based 2D puzzle game. It was developed by Respect Studios and published by ROKiT Games. The game was released on 24 March 2021, and is available on PC and Mac (Steam), Nintendo Switch, Android, and iOS.

== Plot ==
The story revolves around two swatches of fabric (George and Samantha) that were separated by a gust of wind and are trying to reunite.

== Gameplay ==
There are three major characters in the game; with their own special trait.

- George - The determined one
- Frank - The tall one
- Samantha - The caring one

In Where's Samantha, the player mostly plays as the character "George". However, there are levels in which the player has to play using other characters. There are obstacles that can be cleared only when traits of two or more characters are combined.
