= Cloud Gardens (video game) =

- Developer: Noio
- Publisher: Coatsink
- Platforms: Windows; macOS; Xbox One; Nintendo Switch; Xbox Series X/S
- Release: Windows, macOS, Xbox X/S, Xbox One; September 1, 2021; Switch; June 16, 2022
- Genres: Simulation, puzzle
- Mode: Single-player,

Cloud Gardens is a simulation and puzzle game developed by Dutch developer Noio and published by Coatsink. It released in early access in 2020 and was fully released September 1, 2021 for Windows, macOS, Xbox One, and Xbox Series X/S, and later for Nintendo Switch on June 16, 2022. In the game, players must complete a number of dioramas by planting and growing seeds using objects. The game received generally positive reviews on release.

== Gameplay ==
The levels of Cloud Gardens are dioramas depicted as wastelands, such as decrepit playgrounds, parking lots, and rooftops. These dioramas must be completed by growing plants: Each plant begins as a seed, which the player can grow by placing debris such as old toys, broken cars, or empty cans. As the player grows their garden, they obtain new seeds to plant and cover the landscape with. The goal of the game is to have the garden cover enough of the level so that the player can move on to the next, repeating the process. The precise placement of objects is necessary for growing the plants, as the amount of placeable debris is limited, and can also harm the garden if placed incorrectly. These caveats force the player to reset the level if they cannot grow their plants to cover the required amount of landscape.

== Reception ==
According to the review aggregator website Metacritic, Cloud Gardens received "generally favorable reviews" for its Switch version. Rock Paper Shotgun called it as a "competent, unique puzzle game." but said that the large amount of levels could make the game feel monotonous. Nintendo Life praised the sounds, atmosphere, and themes, but said that the controls could be frustrating to use. Nintendo World Report said that it was a "zen-like" experience and praised the message, art, and UI, but was disappointed that the camera angle could not be fully adjusted.
