= Speed Limit (video game) =

2021 video game

- Developer: Gamechuck
- Publisher: Chorus Worldwide
- Director: Igor Kolar
- Designer: Jan Juracic
- Programmers: Vanja Karanovic, Karlo Koscal, Sara Pranjic
- Artist: Jurica Cvetko
- Composer: Matija Malatestinic
- Engine: GameMaker Studio 2
- Platforms: PlayStation 4; Microsoft Windows; Nintendo Switch; Xbox One; Xbox Series X/S
- Release: PS4; February 16, 2021; Windows; February 17, 2021; Nintendo Switch; February 18, 2021; Xbox One, Xbox Series X/S; February 19, 2021
- Genre: Action
- Mode: Single-player

Speed Limit is an action video game developed by Gamechuck and published by Chorus Worldwide. It was released for PlayStation 4, Microsoft Windows, Nintendo Switch, Xbox One and Xbox Series X/S in February 2021.

Speed Limit retraces the history of arcade video games through six different game genres — platform games, racing games, faux 3D games, isometric shooters, vehicular combat games, and vertical shoot 'em ups. The game draws inspirations from, and references classic arcade and action video games such as Metal Slug, Earthworm Jim and Spy Hunter.

== Gameplay ==
Speed Limit is an action video game that features six different genres, which seamlessly change every two levels as the player progresses throughout the game. The first two levels represent a side-scrolling platform-shooter game, the third and the fourth levels depict a racing-shooter game, the fifth and sixth levels emulate a racing-shooter game from a faux 3D perspective, and the seventh and eight levels are defined as an isometric shooter game. The ninth and tenth levels are imagined as vehicular flight combat game.

Speed Limit features easy and normal difficulty modes, as well as a stopwatch feature for tracking time while playing the game. There are two gameplay modes in the game: the normal mode and an infinite mode. The normal mode follows the story, while the infinite mode lets the player go through the game indefinitely.

== Development ==
The Speed Limit demo was released for the Windows platform on Steam on 12 March 2020. Chorus Worldwide later announced that Speed Limit was also being released on consoles on 3 December 2020.

== Reception ==
Lucas Blaine of Comic Book Resources praised the games visuals, also noting that "Speed Limit keeps players constantly guessing -- and (more than often) surprises each time".

Reception

Aggregate score
Aggregator	Score
Metacritic	Nintendo Switch: 68/100; PS4: 73/100
