= Antimatter Dimensions =

2016 incremental game by Hevipelle

- Developer: Hevipelle
- Platforms: Android; Microsoft Windows; macOS; Web browser
- Release: WW: 2016; Steam: WW: 17 December 2021
- Genre: Incremental
- Mode: Single-player

Antimatter Dimensions is a video game created by Finnish developer Hevipelle. It is an incremental idle game with the goal of producing antimatter, which is the central currency used to purchase dimensions and obtain upgrades which increase antimatter production.

During the game's development, the author was inspired by Derivative Clicker's polynomial and prestige layer-based progression. In December 2022, Antimatter Dimensions was ported to Steam along with an update named the "Reality Update", adding late-game progression elements. The game is also available on Android.

== Gameplay ==
The base game starts with 10 antimatter, which is used to purchase the first antimatter dimension. The first antimatter dimension (henceforth referred to as dimension) directly produces antimatter; dimensions operate in a top-down hierarchy of production wherein a dimension produces copies of the previous dimension at a constant rate. Tickspeed upgrades can be bought past 1,000 antimatter, which multiply all antimatter dimensions' production rates by a compounding amount.

Initially, up to four dimensions are accessible, but a total of eight dimensions can be unlocked sequentially through a mechanic known as dimension shifts, which reset antimatter and dimensions for a small production multiplier along with access to a new dimension. Thereafter, the mechanics of dimension boosts and antimatter galaxies are introduced to the player, which amass a larger production multiplier to dimensions and an increase in tickspeed upgrade effectiveness respectively. When the player reaches 1.79e308 antimatter ("Infinite", referring to the IEEE 754 double floating point limit observed in JavaScript floats), the player can collapse the universe, resetting all previous progress in a Big Crunch to gain infinity points, which can be spent on upgrades to accelerate progression toward the next "infinities".

Antimatter Dimensions' core gameplay loop is summarised with a hierarchy of prestige mechanics and prestige layers. Prestige mechanics offer a benefit of some kind by resetting all progress up to that point, whereas prestige layers reset progress for a special currency that defines a new area of content in the game. The three prestige layers are Infinity, Eternity and Reality.

An achievement system with secret achievements is present, along with a custom scripting language to automate most aspects of the gameplay. There is also a news ticker, which displays various inside jokes, internet memes, puns and references.
