= UnderMine =

2019 video game

- Developer: Thorium
- Publisher: Thorium
- Engine: Unity Engine
- Platforms: Microsoft Windows; Nintendo Switch; PlayStation 4; Xbox One
- Release: Windows, Xbox One; August 6, 2020; Nintendo Switch; February 11, 2021; PlayStation 4; March 30, 2021
- Genres: Roguelike, action role-playing
- Mode: Single-player

UnderMine is a roguelike action dungeon crawler video game developed and published by Thorium. It was released for Microsoft Windows and Xbox One on August 6, 2020, which followed an early access release one year earlier. Nintendo Switch and PlayStation 4 versions were released in February and March 2021, respectively.

In UnderMine, players control a series of procedurally generated player characters who are compelled to find their fortune in a dark and dangerous mine. During each run, players progress by descending through the mine's levels, exploring a procedurally generated series of rooms on each level, and gathering rewards. The player character must attempt to survive by defeating monsters in real-time combat and avoiding environmental hazards while collecting items and power-ups in order to defeat bosses. While the player's characters may often die as a result of being overcome by the game's challenges, half of the player's accumulated stash of gold as well as many unlocked equipment or upgrades are retained for use by a new character for the next run. Players may encounter and rescue non-player characters (NPC), who will then stay at the game's hub area to provide permanent upgrades or useful items for trade.

UnderMine has been well-received. Critics praised its roguelike gameplay mechanics and dungeon crawling elements, and drew favorable comparisons to other games such as The Binding of Isaac and The Legend of Zelda series.

A sequel, UnderMine 2, is currently under development.

== Gameplay ==
UnderMine is presented in an isometric view with the player in control of a randomly generated player character, referred to as the "peasant". Armed with a pickaxe, the peasant is tasked by Arkanos the Archmage to investigate the source of tremors within the mines and search for a missing blacksmith. Players could refer to a min-map which is present on the bottom corner of the user interface screen for navigation, and collect keys for the opportunity to reach previously inaccessible areas. Bombs may also be employed to find secret rooms. A range of potential enemies may be encounter during exploration, from mundane rats to fantastical creatures like Spate Flies who spit green orbs, green slime-like beings called Pilfers who attempt to steal the player's gold, and strange monsters which masquerade as treasure chests. Some rooms will feature environmental hazards such as spikes, oiled surfaces, or spinning blades snaking around on tracks. Bosses are designed in such a way that players need to utilize a combination of upgrades and skill in order to defeat them. Should the player character's health points drop to zero after taking damage from enemies or environmental hazards, they become permanently dead and is replaced by a new player character, which starts a new run-through for the player.

The focus on items and character builds is a core element of the gameplay of UnderMine. Players retain half of their gold reserves upon their current character's death, which is stashed away to safety by a loyal canary familiar. Players can use the money to buy equipment and upgrades which also carry over to the next run. The discovery of powerful items called "relics" will greatly impact the probability of success for each run-through: example include floating boots that allow the player character to walk over the otherwise dangerous pits, a sewing kit that retains all ore reserves upon the character's death, or a "Keyblade" which increases swing damage for each key the player possesses. Player characters may encounter non-player characters such as a blacksmith, an alchemist, or a priestess during their journey. Once rescued, they will travel to the hub area and provide permanent upgrades to heroes in the form of statistical boosts, like increased health or damage output.

== Development and release ==
UnderMine is developed and published by Thorium, a two-person Canadian indie game studio founded by Derek Johnson and Clint Tasker in 2015. Both Johnson and Tasker met each other during their time at Canadian developer Relic Entertainment, and later made the decision to leave Relic to start their own studio and pursue their passion projects. UnderMine, Thorium's first video game project, is described as "darkly lighthearted". Johnson and Tasker consider UnderMine to be the sum total of the "highest quality ingredients" collected from the action adventure game, roguelike, and role-playing game (RPG) genres. Earlier video games which have influenced UnderMine include The Legend of Zelda series, Dead Cells, The Binding of Isaac, Rogue Legacy, and Hyper Light Drifter. The gameplay mechanic of rescuing NPC's which would then provide the player with permanent benefits is inspired by the 1990s Super NES title Soul Blazer.

UnderMine was released as an early access PC title for Windows, MacOS, and Linux on August 20, 2019. After five years of development, UnderMine officially transitioned from early access to a full release on August 6, 2020 for Xbox One and all PC platforms, as well as inclusion into Microsoft's Xbox Game Pass subscription service. A port for the Nintendo Switch was released on February 11, 2021, followed by the PlayStation 4 version on March 30.

== Reception ==
Reception

Aggregate scores
Aggregator	Score
Metacritic	NS: 83/100; PS4: 78/100
OpenCritic	84% recommend

Review scores
Publication	Score
Nintendo Life	9/10
Nintendo World Report	8.5/10
Play	8/10
Push Square	8/10
TouchArcade	8/10

UnderMine received generally positive reviews on the PlayStation 4 and Nintendo Switch according to review aggregator Metacritic. Fellow review aggregator OpenCritic assessed that the game received strong approval, being recommended by 84% of critics. By January 2021, the game had already been downloaded 600,000 times in total on Steam and Xbox Game Pass. UnderMine was included in Kotaku staff's list of the 17 Best Games On Xbox Game Pass published in July 2021.

Mitch Vogel from Nintendo Life gave an enthusiastic review for UnderMine and called it one of the best examples of the roguelike genre in terms of its overall design, controls, upgrade systems and presentation, which is put together as a coherent and engrossing experience. Vogel highly recommended UnderMine as an exemplary title for readers who are interested in the roguelike genre. TouchArcade lauded UnderMine as well-constructed and polished to an impressive degree, though its gameplay loop somewhat predictable for certain players who may expect more. Nintendo World Report said Thorium has "struck" gold with UnderMine and called it a "worthy addition" to the Nintendo Switch platform's selection of roguelike titles.

In his positive review of UnderMine for PlayStation 4, Stephen Tailby from Push Square praised its compelling game loop, presentation, variety of modifiers, and the Pilfer enemies as some of the game's highlights. However, he criticized the imprecise aiming, occasional visual glitches, the jump button as being too "floaty" which can sometimes put the player in worse situations if used as a dodge maneuver, and unbalanced difficulty of certain rooms. Play noted that while UnderMine is not a particularly complicated roguelike title that borrows much from The Binding Of Isaac in terms of its actual gameplay, it is nevertheless a fun and wholesome title.
