= Neon Chrome =

2016 video game

- Developer: 10tons
- Publisher: 10tons
- Composer: Jonathan Geer
- Platforms: Microsoft Windows; PlayStation 4; Xbox One; Linux; macOS; iOS; Android; PlayStation Vita; Nintendo Switch
- Release: Windows; 28 April 2016; PlayStation 4; 31 May 2016; Xbox One; 8 June 2016; Linux, macOS; 3 November 2016; PlayStation Vita; 29 November 2016; Android; 27 April 2017; Switch; 12 October 2017
- Genre: Multidirectional shooter
- Modes: Single-player, multiplayer

Neon Chrome is a twin-stick shooter video game developed by 10tons.

== Gameplay ==
Neon Chrome is a cyberpunk-themed twin-stick shooter video game played from a top-down perspective. The player takes control of remote controlled human clones and is tasked with eliminating the Overseer to stop their oppressive regime on the dystopic society. The player must ascend to the top floor of the company building where the Overseer is based. The game features procedurally generated levels and destructible environments. The game supports local cooperative play.

== Development and release ==
Neon Chrome was developed and published by 10tons. The game was released in 2016 for Windows on 28 April, PlayStation 4 on 31 May, Xbox One on 8 June, and Linux and macOS on 3 November. A Nintendo Switch version was released on 12 October 2017. In 2017, they released a survival mode called "Arena" as downloadable content.

== Reception ==
Reception

Aggregate score
| Aggregator | Score |
|---|---|
| Metacritic | PC: 74/100; PS4: 63/100; XONE: 72/100 iOS: 92/100; NS: 67/100 |

Review scores
| Publication | Score |
|---|---|
| Nintendo Life | 5/10 |
| Nintendo World Report | 8.5/10 |
| Hardcore Gamer | 2.5/5 |
| Pocket Gamer | iOS: 8/10; 7/10 (NS) |
| Push Square | 5/10 |
| TouchArcade | iOS: 5/5 |

Neon Chrome received "mixed or average" reviews on PC and consoles from professional critics according to review aggregator website Metacritic, but the mobile version was more positively received.
