= List of video games released in 2020 =

The following is a comprehensive index of all games released in 2020, sorted chronologically by release date, and divided by quarter. Information regarding developer, publisher, operating system, genre, and type of release is provided where available

For a summary of 2020 in video games as a whole, see 2020 in video games.

== Legend ==
Video game platforms
Arcade	Arcade video game	DROID	Android	iOS	iOS, iPhone, iPod, iPadOS, iPad, visionOS, Apple Vision Pro
LIN	Linux, SteamOS	NS	Nintendo Switch	OSX	macOS
PS4	PlayStation 4	PS5	PlayStation 5	PSV	PlayStation Vita
Quest	Meta Quest / Oculus Quest family, including Oculus Rift	Stadia	Google Stadia	Steam	Steam
WEB	Browser game	WIN	Windows, all versions Windows 95 and up	XBO	Xbox One
XBX/S	Xbox Series X/S	Vive	HTC Vive		

Types of releases
Compilation	A compilation, anthology or collection of several titles, usually (but not always) belonging to the same series
Early access	A game launched in early access is unfinished and thus might contain bugs and glitches or have some of the content missing
Episodic	An episodic video game that is released in batches over a period of time
Expansion	A large-scale DLC to an already existing game that adds new story, areas and additions and/or changes to the game's mechanics
Full release	A full release of a game that launched in early access first
Limited	A special release (often called "Limited" or "Collector's Edition") with bonus collector's material. Often provided to people who pre-order a game
Port	The game first appeared on a different platform and a port was made. The game is like the original, with few or no differences
Remake	The game is an enhanced remake of an original, made using a new engine and/or assets and thus containing completely new sound, graphics and possibly changes to the story and/or gameplay
Remaster	The game is a remaster of an original, released on the same or different platform, with (usually minor) changes to graphics, sound and/or gameplay
Rerelease	The game was re-released on the same platform with no or only minor changes

Video game genres
Action	Action game	Action RPG	Action role-playing game	Action-adventure	Action-adventure game
Adventure	Adventure game	Battle royale	Battle royale game	Brawler	Beat 'em up
CMS	Construction and management simulation	DCCG	Digital collectible card game	Deck building	Deck building game
Digital tabletop	Digital tabletop game	Dungeon crawl	Dungeon crawl	Farming	Farm life sim
Fighting	Fighting game	FPS	First-person shooter	Graphic adventure	Graphic adventure
Hack and slash	Hack and slash	Horror	Horror game	Metroidvania	Metroidvania
MMO	Massively multiplayer online game	MOBA	Multiplayer online battle arena	Party	Party video game
PCA	Point-and-click adventure	Platformer	Platformer	Puzzle	Puzzle video game
Puzzle-platformer	Puzzle-platformer	Racing	Racing video game	Rhythm	Rhythm game
Roguelike	Roguelike, Roguelite	RPG	Role-playing video game	RTS	Real-time strategy
RTT	Real-time tactics	Run and gun	Run and gun game	Shoot 'em up	Shoot 'em up
Simulation	Simulation video game	Social sim	Social simulation game	Sports	Sports video game
Stealth	Stealth game	Strategy	Strategy video game	Survival	Survival game
Survival horror	Survival horror	Tactical RPG	Tactical role-playing game	TBS	Turn-based strategy
TBT	Turn-based tactics	Tower defense	Tower defense	TPS	Third-person shooter
Vehicle sim	Vehicle simulation game	Visual novel	Visual novel		

== List ==
=== January–March ===
Release date	Title	Platform	Type	Genre	Developer	Publisher	Ref.
January 6	William's Love Prelude	WIN		RPG		Pika's Game	
January 9	AO Tennis 2	WIN, NS, PS4, XBO		Sports	Big Ant Studios	Bigben Interactive	
January 9	Monster Hunter World: Iceborne	WIN		Action RPG	Capcom		
January 9	Mythic Ocean	WIN		Adventure	Paralune	nakana.io	
January 11	Deep the Game	WIN, DROID		Adventure, Platformer		Goricina Productions	
January 14	Atelier Dusk Trilogy Deluxe Pack	WIN, NS, PS4		RPG		Koei Tecmo	
January 15	Puzzle & Dragons Gold	NS		Puzzle	GungHo Online Entertainment		
January 16	Arknights	iOS, DROID		Action RPG, Tactical RPG, Tower defense	Hypergryph, Studio Montagne	Hypergryph, Yostar	
January 16	Cookie Run: Puzzle World	iOS, DROID		Puzzle, Tile-matching	Devsisters		
January 16	Kandagawa Jet Girls (JP)	PS4		Racing	Honey∞Parade Games		
January 16	Pascal's Wager	iOS		Soulslike	TipsWorks	Giant Network	
January 16	Yakuza: Like a Dragon (JP)	PS4		RPG	Ryu Ga Gotoku Studio	Sega	
January 17	Dragon Ball Z: Kakarot	WIN, PS4, XBO		Action RPG	CyberConnect2	Bandai Namco Entertainment	
January 17	Tokyo Mirage Sessions ♯FE Encore	NS		RPG	Atlus	Nintendo	
January 21	Psikyo Shooting Stars Alpha	NS		Shoot 'em up		NIS America	
January 21	The Walking Dead: A New Frontier	NS	Port	Graphic adventure	Telltale Games	Skybound Entertainment	
January 21	The Walking Dead: Season Two	NS	Port	Graphic adventure	Telltale Games	Skybound Entertainment	
January 23	Oddworld: Stranger's Wrath HD	NS		FPS, TPS, Action-adventure	Just Add Water	Oddworld Inhabitants	
January 23	The Walking Dead: Saints and Sinners	WIN		Survival horror	Skydance Interactive, Skybound Entertainment	Skybound Entertainment	
January 28	Journey to the Savage Planet	WIN, PS4, XBO		Adventure	Typhoon Studios	505 Games	
January 28	Kentucky Route Zero	WIN, LIN, OSX, NS, PS4, XBO		PCA	Cardboard Computer	Annapurna Interactive	
January 28	Pillars of Eternity II: Deadfire	PS4, XBO		RPG	Obsidian Entertainment	Versus Evil	
January 28	Thronebreaker: The Witcher Tales	NS		DCCG	CD Projekt Red	CD Projekt	
January 28	Warcraft III: Reforged	WIN, OSX		RTS	Blizzard Entertainment, Lemon Sky Studios	Blizzard Entertainment	
January 29	beatmania IIDX 27: Heroic Verse	Arcade		Rhythm	Konami Digital Entertainment	Konami	
January 29	Code Shifter	WIN, NS, PS4, XBO		Action	Arc System Works		
January 29	Coffee Talk	WIN, OSX, NS, PS4, XBO		Visual novel	Toge Productions		
January 30	Patapon 2 Remastered	PS4		Rhythm	Pyramid, Japan Studio	Sony Interactive Entertainment	
January 31	Hypercharge: Unboxed	NS		FPS, TPS, Tower defense	Digital Cybercherries		
February 3	Monster Energy Supercross 3	WIN, NS, PS4, XBO, Stadia		Racing	Milestone srl		
February 4	The Dark Crystal: Age of Resistance Tactics	WIN, OSX, NS, PS4, XBO		TBS	BonusXP, En Masse Entertainment	Netflix	
February 4	Zombie Army 4: Dead War	WIN, PS4, XBO		TPS, Survival horror	Rebellion Developments		
February 6	Granblue Fantasy Versus (JP)	PS4		Fighting, RPG	Arc System Works	Cygames	
February 7	Crash Drive 2	NS		Racing, Action		M2H	
February 7	Marooners	NS		Action		M2H	
February 8	Knights and Bikes	NS		Action-adventure	Foam Sword	Double Fine	
February 9	Kunai	WIN, NS		Action, Platformer	TurtleBlaze	The Arcade Crew	
February 10	Boris and the Dark Survival	WIN, DROID		Dungeon crawl		Joey Drew Studios	
February 11	Yakuza 5	PS4		Action-adventure	Ryu Ga Gotoku Studio	Sega	
February 13	Azur Lane: Crosswave	WIN, PS4		TPS	Felistella	Idea Factory International	
February 13	Daemon X Machina	WIN		TPS	Marvelous First Studio	Xseed Games	
February 13	Death end re;Quest 2 (JP)	PS4		RPG	Compile Heart		
February 13	Florence	WIN, NS		Minigame	Mountains	Annapurna Interactive	
February 13	Hatsune Miku: Project DIVA Mega Mix (JP)	NS		Rhythm	Sega, Crypton Future Media	Sega	
February 14	Darksiders Genesis	NS, PS4, XBO		Hack and slash, RPG	Airship Syndicate	THQ Nordic	
February 14	Dreams	PS4		GCS	Media Molecule	Sony Interactive Entertainment	
February 14	Snack World: The Dungeon Crawl - Gold	NS		RPG	Level-5, h.a.n.d.	Level-5	
February 14	Street Fighter V: Champion Edition	WIN, PS4		Fighting	Capcom, Dimps	Capcom	
February 14	Warriors Orochi 4 Ultimate	NS, PS4, XBO, WIN		Hack and slash	Omega Force	Koei Tecmo	
February 17	Warface	NS		FPS	Crytek Kiev	My.com	
February 18	Bayonetta & Vanquish 10th Anniversary Bundle	PS4, XBO		Action, Hack and slash, TPS	PlatinumGames	Sega	
February 18	Hunt: Showdown	PS4		FPS, Survival horror		Koch Media	
February 18	Kingdom Hearts HD 1.5 + 2.5 Remix	XBO		Action RPG		Square Enix	
February 18	Kingdom Hearts HD 2.8 Final Chapter Prologue	XBO		Action RPG		Square Enix	
February 18	Psikyo Shooting Stars Bravo	NS		Shoot 'em up		NIS America	
February 19	Atlantis no Nazo (JP)	NS		Platformer			
February 19	Eliminator Boat Duel	NS		Racing			
February 19	Pop'n TwinBee	NS		Scrolling shooter			
February 19	Shadow of the Ninja	NS		Hack and slash, Platformer			
February 19	Smash Tennis	NS		Sports			
February 20	Devil May Cry 3: Special Edition	NS		Action-adventure, Hack and slash		Capcom	
February 20	Double Dragon & Kunio-kun Retro Brawler Bundle	NS, PS4		Brawler		Arc System Works	
February 20	Dreadout 2	WIN		Survival horror		Digital Happiness	
February 20	Katana Kami: A Way of the Samurai Story	WIN, NS, PS4		Action RPG		Spike Chunsoft	
February 20	Persona 5 Strikers (JP)	NS, PS4		Hack and slash, RPG		Atlus	
February 20	Under Night In-Birth Exe:Late[cl-r]	NS, PS4		Fighting		Aksys Games	
February 20	Vitamin Connection	NS		Action-adventure		WayForward	
February 25	Dota Underlords	WIN, OSX, LIN, iOS, DROID		Auto battler		Valve	
February 25	Dragon Quest of the Stars	iOS, DROID		RPG		Square Enix	
February 25	Mega Man Zero/ZX Legacy Collection	WIN, NS, PS4, XBO		Action, Platformer		Capcom	
February 25	Rune Factory 4 Special	NS		RPG		Xseed Games	
February 25	Samurai Shodown	NS	Port	Fighting		SNK	
February 25	Sayonara Wild Hearts	XBO		Rhythm		Annapurna Interactive	
February 25	Space Channel 5 VR: Kinda Funky News Flash	PS4		Music		Sega	
February 25	Two Point Hospital	NS, PS4, XBO		Simulation		Sega	
February 26	Hero Must Die. Again	WIN, PS4		RPG		Degica Games	
February 26	Yakuza 0	XBO		Action-adventure		Sega	
February 27	Hero Must Die. Again	NS		RPG		Degica Games	
February 27	MouseCraft	NS		Puzzle		Crunching Koalas	
February 28	Kingdom Under Fire: The Crusaders	WIN		RTT		Blueside	
February 28	Metro Redux	NS		FPS		Deep Silver	
February 28	One-Punch Man: A Hero Nobody Knows	WIN, PS4, XBO		Fighting		Bandai Namco Entertainment	
February 28	Romance of the Three Kingdoms XIV	WIN, PS4		Strategy		Koei Tecmo	
March 3	Granblue Fantasy Versus	PS4		Fighting, RPG		Xseed Games	
March 3	The Political Machine 2020	WIN		Government sim		Stardock Entertainment	
March 4	Castlevania: Symphony of the Night	iOS, DROID		Metroidvania		Konami	
March 5	Black Mesa	WIN, LIN		FPS		Crowbar Collective	
March 5	ibb & obb	NS		Puzzle, Platformer		Sparpweed Games	
March 5	Murder by Numbers	NS		Visual novel, Puzzle		The Irregular Corporation	
March 6	Murder by Numbers	WIN		Visual novel, Puzzle		The Irregular Corporation	
March 6	Pathologic 2	PS4		Survival horror		tinyBuild	
March 6	Pokémon Mystery Dungeon: Rescue Team DX	NS		Roguelike		Nintendo, The Pokémon Company	
March 10	Call of Duty: Warzone	WIN, PS4, XBO		FPS		Activision	
March 10	Langrisser I & II	WIN, NS, PS4		Tactical RPG		NIS America	
March 11	Ori and the Will of the Wisps	WIN, XBO		Platformer, Adventure, Metroidvania		Xbox Game Studios	
March 12	Bless Unleashed	XBO		MMO, RPG		Bandai Namco Entertainment, Neowiz	
March 12	Collar × Malice (JP)	NS		Visual novel		Idea Factory	
March 12	Shieldmaiden: Remix Edition	WIN		Action, Platformer		Dumativa	
March 13	Dead or School	PS4		Action-adventure		Marvelous	
March 13	Granblue Fantasy Versus	WIN		Fighting, RPG		Cygames	
March 13	My Hero: One's Justice 2	WIN, NS, PS4, XBO		Fighting		Bandai Namco Entertainment	
March 13	Nioh 2	PS4		Action RPG		Koei Tecmo	
March 16	R.B.I. Baseball 20	NS, PS4, XBO		Sports		MLB Advanced Media	
March 17	Exit the Gungeon	WIN, NS		Dungeon crawl		Devolver Digital	
March 17	MLB The Show 20	PS4		Sports		Sony Interactive Entertainment	
March 19	Panzer Corps 2	WIN		Wargame		Slitherine Software	
March 19	Teamfight Tactics	iOS, DROID		Auto battler		Riot Games	
March 20	Animal Crossing: New Horizons	NS		Social sim		Nintendo	
March 20	Doom 64	WIN, NS, PS4, XBO		FPS		Bethesda Softworks	
March 20	Doom Eternal	WIN, PS4, XBO, Stadia	Original	FPS		Bethesda Softworks	
March 23	Half-Life: Alyx	WIN, LIN		FPS		Valve	
March 23	The Legend of Heroes: Trails of Cold Steel III	WIN		RPG		NIS America	
March 24	Bleeding Edge	WIN, XBO		Brawler		Xbox Game Studios	
March 24	Paper Beast	PS4		Adventure, Puzzle		Pixel Reef	
March 24	Twin Breaker: A Sacred Symbols Adventure	PS4, PSV		Breakout clone		Lillymo Games	
March 24	Vampire: The Masquerade – Coteries of New York	NS		Adventure		Draw Distance	
March 24	Yu-Gi-Oh! Legacy of the Duelist: Link Evolution	WIN, PS4, XBO		DCCG		Konami	
March 25	Vampire: The Masquerade – Coteries of New York	PS4		Adventure		Draw Distance	
March 26	Good Job!	NS		Puzzle		Nintendo	
March 26	Panzer Dragoon: Remake	NS		Shoot 'em up (rail)		Forever Entertainment	
March 26	Shinsekai: Into the Depths	NS		Adventure		Capcom	
March 26	Star Wars Jedi Knight: Jedi Academy	NS, PS4		FPS, TPS		Aspyr	
March 27	Biped	WIN		Puzzle-platformer		META Publishing	
March 27	One Piece: Pirate Warriors 4	WIN, NS, PS4, XBO		Action-adventure, Brawler		Bandai Namco Entertainment	
March 27	Saints Row IV: Re-Elected	NS		Action-adventure		Deep Silver	
March 27	Under Night In-Birth Exe:Late[cl-r]	WIN		Fighting		Arc System Works	
March 31	Bubble Bobble 4 Friends	NS		Platformer		Taito	
March 31	Call of Duty: Modern Warfare 2 Campaign Remastered	PS4	Remaster	FPS		Activision	
March 31	Cooking Mama: Cookstar	NS		Simulation, Minigame		Planet Entertainment	
March 31	Persona 5 Royal	PS4		RPG, Social sim		Atlus	
March 31	Ty the Tasmanian Tiger HD	NS, PS4, XBO		Platformer		Krome Studios	

=== April–June ===
Release date	Title	Platform	Type	Genre	Developer	Publisher	Ref.
April 2	My Friend Pedro	PS4		Shoot 'em up		Devolver Digital	
April 3	Resident Evil 3	WIN, PS4, XBO	Remake	Survival horror		Capcom	
April 6	Cell to Singularity	DROID		Incremental, Educational			
April 7	Below	PS4		Roguelike		Capybara Games	
April 7	Disaster Report 4: Summer Memories	WIN, NS, PS4		Action-adventure		NIS America	
April 8	Biped	PS4		Puzzle-platformer		META Publishing	
April 10	Final Fantasy VII Remake	PS4		Action RPG		Square Enix	
April 14	Space Engineers	XBO		Sandbox, Simulation		Keen Software House	
April 15	Phantasy Star Online 2	XBO		MMO, RPG		Sega	
April 15	Vampire: The Masquerade – Coteries of New York	XBO		Adventure		Draw Distance	
April 17	Merchant of the Skies	WIN, OSX, LIN		Simulation		Coldwind Games, AbsoDev	
April 21	No One Lives Under the Lighthouse	WIN		Adventure, Horror		Marevo Collective	
April 22	Yakuza Kiwami	XBO		Action-adventure		Sega	
April 23	Azure Striker Gunvolt: Striker Pack	PS4		Action, Platformer		Inti Creates	
April 23	Bokuhime Project (JP)	NS, PS4		Adventure		Nippon Ichi Software	
April 23	Cloudpunk	WIN		Adventure		Merge Games	
April 23	Little Town Hero (JP)	PS4		RPG		Rainy Frog	
April 23	MotoGP 20	WIN, NS, PS4, XBO, Stadia		Racing		Milestone srl	
April 23	Picross S4	NS		Puzzle		Jupiter Corporation	
April 23	Umihara Kawase Fresh! (JP)	PS4		Platformer		Success Corporation	
April 24	Naruto Shippuden: Ultimate Ninja Storm 4 – Road to Boruto	NS		Fighting, Action		Bandai Namco Entertainment	
April 24	Predator: Hunting Grounds	WIN, PS4		Action		Sony Interactive Entertainment	
April 24	Silverio Ragnarok (JP)	WIN		Visual novel		Ares Co.	
April 24	Trials of Mana	WIN, NS, PS4		Action RPG		Square Enix	
April 24	XCOM: Chimera Squad	WIN		TBS		2K Games	
April 27	Hypercharge: Unboxed	WIN		FPS, TPS, Tower defense		Digital Cybercherries	
April 28	Gears Tactics	WIN		TBS		Xbox Game Studios	
April 28	Moving Out	WIN, NS, PS4, XBO		Simulation, Strategy		Team17	
April 28	Octopath Traveler	Stadia		RPG		Square Enix	
April 28	Sakura Wars	PS4		Action RPG		Sega	
April 28	SnowRunner	WIN, PS4, XBO		Simulation		Focus Home Interactive	
April 28	Telling Lies	NS, PS4, XBO		Interactive film		Annapurna Interactive	
April 30	Call of Duty: Modern Warfare 2 Campaign Remastered	WIN, XBO		FPS		Activision	
April 30	Legends of Runeterra	WIN, iOS, DROID		DCCG		Riot Games	
April 30	Streets of Rage 4	WIN, NS, PS4, XBO		Brawler		Dotemu	
April 30	Them's Fightin' Herds	WIN		Brawler		Maximum Games	
April 30	Touhou LostWord (JP)	iOS, DROID		Action RPG, TBS			
May 5	John Wick Hex	PS4		Action, Strategy		Good Shepherd Entertainment	
May 7	Void Bastards	NS, PS4		FPS, Roguelike		Humble Bundle	
May 11	Helltaker	WIN, OSX, LIN		Adventure, Puzzle, Dating sim		Łukasz Piskorz	
May 13	Deep Rock Galactic	WIN, XBO		FPS		Coffee Stain	
May 13	Super Mega Baseball 3	WIN, NS, PS4, XBO		Sports		Metalhead Software	
May 14	The Elder Scrolls: Blades	NS		Action RPG		Bethesda Softworks	
May 14	Ion Fury	NS, PS4, XBO		FPS		3D Realms	
May 14	Signs of the Sojourner	WIN, NS, PS4, XBO		Deck building		Echodog Games	
May 15	Hatsune Miku: Project DIVA Mega Mix	NS		Rhythm		Sega	
May 19	Golf with Your Friends	WIN, NS, PS4, XBO		Sports		Team17	
May 19	Mafia II: Definitive Edition	WIN, PS4, XBO		Action-adventure		2K Games	
May 19	Mafia III: Definitive Edition	WIN, PS4, XBO		Action-adventure		2K Games	
May 19	Umurangi Generation	WIN		Photography		Playism	
May 19	The Wonderful 101: Remastered	WIN, NS, PS4		Action-adventure, Hack and slash		PlatinumGames	
May 20	Cannibal Cuisine	WIN, NS		Action, Party		Rocket Vulture	
May 20	Crucible	WIN		Hero shooter		Amazon Game Studios	
May 20	Operation Logic Bomb	NS		Action			
May 20	Panel de Pon (Note: Original Japanese version of Tetris Attack)	NS		Puzzle			
May 20	Rygar	NS		Platformer			
May 20	Wild Guns	NS		Shooting gallery			
May 21	Biped	NS		Puzzle-platformer		META Publishing	
May 21	Danganronpa: Trigger Happy Havoc Anniversary Edition	iOS, DROID		Adventure, Visual novel		Spike Chunsoft	
May 21	Monster Train	WIN, XBO		Roguelike, TBS		Good Shepherd Entertainment	
May 21	The Persistence	WIN, NS, PS4, XBO		FPS		Perp Games	
May 21	Spirit Hunter: NG (JP)	NS		Adventure, Visual novel		Experience	
May 22	Maneater	WIN, PS4, XBO		Action RPG		Deep Silver	
May 22	Monstrum	NS, PS4, XBO		Survival horror		Soedesco	
May 22	Saints Row: The Third Remastered	WIN, PS4, XBO	Remaster	Action-adventure		Deep Silver	
May 26	Minecraft Dungeons	WIN, NS, PS4, XBO		Dungeon crawl		Xbox Game Studios	
May 26	Utawarerumono: Prelude to the Fallen	PS4, PSV		RPG		NIS America	
May 26	Wildfire	WIN		Stealth		Humble Bundle	
May 27	Phantasy Star Online 2	WIN		MMO, RPG		Sega	
May 28	Shantae and the Seven Sirens	WIN, NS, PS4, XBO		Platformer, Metroidvania		WayForward	
May 28	Synaptic Drive	WIN, NS		Action, Shooter		Yunuo Games	
May 28	Those Who Remain	WIN, PS4, XBO		Horror		Wired Productions, WhisperGames	
May 28	Umihara Kawase BaZooKa!! (JP)	WIN, NS, PS4		Action		Success Corporation	
May 28	Umihara Kawase Fresh!	WIN		Platformer		Success Corporation	
May 29	BioShock: The Collection	NS		FPS		2K Games	
May 29	Borderlands Legendary Collection	NS		Action RPG, FPS		2K Games	
May 29	XCOM 2 Collection	NS		TBT, Tactical RPG		2K Games	
May 29	Xenoblade Chronicles: Definitive Edition	NS		Action RPG		Nintendo	
June 2	Liberated	NS		Puzzle-platformer		Atomic Wolf	
June 2	Valorant	WIN		FPS		Riot Games	
June 4	The TakeOver	NS		Brawler		Dangen Entertainment	
June 5	Clubhouse Games: 51 Worldwide Classics	NS		Party		Nintendo	
June 5	Command & Conquer Remastered Collection	WIN		RTS		Electronic Arts	
June 5	The Outer Worlds	NS		Action RPG		Private Division	
June 5	We Were Here Together	XBO		Puzzle, Adventure		Total Mayhem Games	
June 9	Project Warlock	PS4		FPS		Crunching Koalas	
June 9	Ys: Memories of Celceta	PS4		Action RPG		Xseed Games	
June 11	Project Warlock	NS		FPS		Crunching Koalas	
June 11	Samurai Shodown	WIN	Port	Fighting		SNK	
June 11	Samurai Shodown NeoGeo Collection	WIN	Compilation	Fighting		SNK	
June 12	Project Warlock	XBO		FPS		Crunching Koalas	
June 13	Persona 4 Golden	WIN		RPG, Social sim		Atlus	
June 16	Desperados III	WIN, PS4, XBO		RTT		THQ Nordic	
June 16	Disintegration	WIN, PS4, XBO		FPS		Private Division	
June 16	Jump Rope Challenge	NS		Fitness		Nintendo	
June 19	Burnout Paradise Remastered	NS		Racing		Electronic Arts	
June 19	The Last of Us Part II	PS4	Original	Action-adventure, Survival horror		Sony Interactive Entertainment	
June 22	Azure Striker Gunvolt 2	WIN		Action, Platformer		Inti Creates	
June 22	Kingdom Hearts Dark Road	iOS, DROID		Action RPG		Square Enix	
June 23	Duke Nukem 3D: 20th Anniversary World Tour	NS		FPS		Gearbox Publishing	
June 23	Little Town Hero	PS4		RPG		NIS America	
June 23	Pokémon Café Mix	NS, iOS, DROID		Puzzle		Nintendo, The Pokémon Company	
June 23	SpongeBob SquarePants: Battle for Bikini Bottom – Rehydrated	WIN, NS, PS4, XBO		Platformer		THQ Nordic	
June 23	Star Wars Episode I: Racer	NS, PS4		Racing		Aspyr	
June 24	Ninjala	NS		Action		GungHo Online Entertainment	
June 25	Brigandine: The Legend of Runersia	NS		Tactical RPG		Happinet	
June 25	Collar × Malice	NS		Visual novel		Aksys Games	
June 25	Death Come True	NS, iOS, DROID		Adventure		IzanagiGames	
June 25	Mr. Driller Drill Land	WIN, NS		Puzzle		Bandai Namco Entertainment	
June 25	Pascal's Wager	DROID		Soulslike		Giant Network	
June 29	Blaster Master Zero	PS4		Action-adventure		Inti Creates	
June 29	Blaster Master Zero 2	PS4		Action-adventure		Inti Creates	
June 30	Automobilista 2	WIN		Racing		Reiza Studios	
June 30	The Legend of Heroes: Trails of Cold Steel III	NS		RPG		NIS America	

=== July–September ===
Release date	Title	Platform	Type	Genre	Developer	Publisher	Ref.
July 1	Trackmania	WIN		Racing		Ubisoft	
July 2	Little Town Hero	XBO		RPG		Game Freak	
July 3	Marvel's Iron Man VR	PS4		Shooter		Sony Interactive Entertainment	
July 7	Catherine: Full Body	NS		Puzzle		Atlus	
July 7	Superliminal	NS, PS4, XBO		Puzzle		Pillow Castle	
July 8	Vigor	NS		Looter shooter		Bohemia Interactive	
July 9	CrossCode	NS, PS4, XBO		Action RPG		Deck13	
July 9	Little Town Hero	WIN		RPG		Game Freak	
July 10	Bloodstained: Curse of the Moon 2	WIN, NS, PS4, XBO		Platformer		Inti Creates	
July 10	Creaks	iOS		Graphic adventure		Amanita Design	
July 10	Deadly Premonition 2: A Blessing in Disguise	NS		Survival horror		Rising Star Games	
July 10	F1 2020	WIN, PS4, XBO, Stadia		Racing		Codemasters	
July 10	NASCAR Heat 5	WIN, PS4, XBO		Racing		Motorsport Games	
July 10	Sword Art Online: Alicization Lycoris	WIN, PS4, XBO		Action RPG		Bandai Namco Entertainment	
July 11	Dweller's Empty Path	WIN, OSX		RPG		Temmie Chang	
July 11	Family	WIN, OSX		Puzzle		Sheinman Games	
July 14	Death Stranding	WIN		Action		505 Games	
July 14	Orcs Must Die! 3	WIN, PS4, XBO		Tower defense, Action		Robot Entertainment	
July 14	Rocket Arena	WIN, PS4, XBO		TPS, Action		Electronic Arts	
July 14	Story of Seasons: Friends of Mineral Town	WIN, NS		Farming		Xseed Games	
July 15	Donkey Kong Country	NS		Platformer			
July 15	The Immortal	NS		Action-adventure			
July 15	Natsume Championship Wrestling	NS		Fighting, Sports (wrestling)			
July 15	Shin Megami Tensei (JP)	NS		RPG			
July 16	Before I Forget	WIN, OSX, LIN		Adventure		3-Fold Games	
July 16	Dragon Quest Tact	iOS, DROID		RPG		Square Enix	
July 16	Superhot: Mind Control Delete	WIN, PS4, XBO		FPS		Superhot Team	
July 17	Death Come True	WIN		Adventure		IzanagiGames	
July 17	Ghost of Tsushima	PS4	Original	Action-adventure		Sony Interactive Entertainment	
July 17	Necrobarista	WIN, OSX, iOS		Visual novel		Route 59	
July 17	Paper Mario: The Origami King	NS		Action-adventure, RPG		Nintendo	
July 17	Warhammer 40,000: Mechanicus	NS, PS4, XBO		TBT		Kasedo Games	
July 21	Rock of Ages 3: Make & Break	WIN, NS, PS4, XBO, Stadia		Action		Modus Games	
July 22	Creaks	WIN, OSX, NS, PS4, XBO		Graphic adventure		Amanita Design	
July 23	Carrion	WIN, OSX, LIN, NS, XBO		Horror		Devolver Digital	
July 23	Crysis Remastered	NS		FPS		Crytek	
July 24	Tannenberg	PS4, XBO		FPS		M2H, Blackmill Games	
July 28	Aggretsuko: The Short Timer Strikes Back	iOS, DROID		Puzzle		Hive Co. Ltd.	
July 28	Cuphead	PS4		Run and gun		StudioMDHR	
July 28	Destroy All Humans!	WIN, PS4, XBO		Action-adventure		THQ Nordic	
July 28	Lost Wing	PS4		Racing		2Awesome Studio	
July 28	Maid of Sker	WIN, PS4, XBO		Survival horror		Wales Interactive	
July 28	Othercide	WIN, PS4, XBO		TBS, Roguelike		Focus Home Interactive	
July 28	Samurai Shodown NeoGeo Collection	NS, PS4, XBO		Fighting		SNK	
July 29	Lost Wing	XBO		Racing		2Awesome Studio	
July 30	Doraemon Story of Seasons (JP)	PS4		Farming, RPG		Bandai Namco Entertainment	
July 30	Hakuoki Shinkai: Ginsei no Shō (JP)	NS		Visual novel		Idea Factory	
July 30	Hellpoint	WIN, PS4, XBO		Action RPG		tinyBuild	
July 30	Mobile Suit Gundam Extreme VS. Maxiboost ON	PS4		Action		Bandai Namco Entertainment	
July 30	Root Film (JP)	NS, PS4		Adventure, Visual novel		Kadokawa Games	
July 30	Yakuza Kiwami 2	XBO		Action-adventure		Sega	
July 30	Yoru, Tomosu (JP)	NS, PS4		Visual novel		Nippon Ichi Software	
July 31	Cat Quest + Cat Quest II Pawsome Pack	NS, PS4		Action RPG		PQube	
July 31	Fairy Tail	WIN, NS, PS4		RPG		Koei Tecmo	
July 31	Lost Wing	WIN, NS		Racing		2Awesome Studio	
July 31	Monster Crown	WIN		RPG		Soedesco	
August 4	Fall Guys: Ultimate Knockout	WIN, PS4		Battle royale, Platformer		Devolver Digital	
August 6	UnderMine	WIN, OSX, LIN, XBO		Action-adventure, Roguelike		Thorium Entertainment	
August 7	Fast & Furious Crossroads	WIN, PS4, XBO		Racing, Action RPG		Bandai Namco Entertainment	
August 7	The Henry Stickmin Collection	WIN		PCA		Innersloth	
August 7	Horizon Zero Dawn	WIN	Port	Action RPG		Sony Interactive Entertainment	
August 11	Hyper Scape	WIN, PS4, XBO		Battle royale, FPS		Ubisoft	
August 11	Risk of Rain 2	WIN, NS, PS4, XBO		Roguelike		Gearbox Publishing	
August 13	Boomerang Fu	WIN, NS, XBO		Fighting, Party		Cranky Watermelon	
August 13	Collar × Malice: Unlimited	NS		Visual novel		Aksys Games	
August 13	Dragon Quest Rivals Ace	iOS, DROID		DCCG		Square Enix	
August 13	A Total War Saga: Troy	WIN		TBS, RTT		Sega	
August 14	EA Sports UFC 4	PS4, XBO		Sports		EA Sports	
August 14	Factorio	WIN		CMS		Wube Software	
August 18	Bleach: Brave Souls	WIN		Brawler		KLabGames	
August 18	Microsoft Flight Simulator	WIN		Vehicle sim (plane)		Xbox Game Studios	
August 18	Mortal Shell	WIN, PS4, XBO		Action RPG		Playstack	
August 18	Raji: An Ancient Epic	WIN, NS, PS4, XBO		Action-adventure		Nodding Heads Games	
August 18	Spiritfarer	WIN, NS, PS4, XBO		Adventure, Simulation		Thunder Lotus Games	
August 20	Battletoads	WIN, XBO		Brawler		Xbox Game Studios	
August 20	Cupid Parasite (JP)	NS		Visual novel		Idea Factory	
August 20	Danganronpa 2: Goodbye Despair Anniversary Edition	iOS, DROID		Adventure, Visual novel		Spike Chunsoft	
August 20	Ogre Tale	WIN		Brawler		Degica Games	
August 20	Phoenotopia: Awakening (NA)	NS		Action-adventure, Metroidvania, Platformer		Cape Cosmic	
August 21	Aokana: Four Rhythm Across the Blue	NS		Visual novel		PQube	
August 21	New Super Lucky's Tale	PS4, XBO		Platformer		Playful Corp.	
August 21	PGA Tour 2K21	WIN, NS, PS4, XBO, Stadia		Sports		2K Sports	
August 21	Samurai Jack: Battle Through Time	WIN, NS, PS4, XBO		Action, Hack and slash		Adult Swim Games	
August 25	Cinders	PS4		Visual novel		Crunching Koalas	
August 25	Kandagawa Jet Girls	WIN, PS4		Racing		Xseed Games	
August 25	No Straight Roads	WIN, NS, PS4, XBO		Action-adventure		Sold Out Ltd.	
August 26	Cinders	XBO		Visual novel		Crunching Koalas	
August 27	Final Fantasy Crystal Chronicles: Remastered Edition	NS, PS4, iOS, DROID		Action RPG		Square Enix	
August 27	The Last Campfire	WIN, NS, PS4, XBO		Adventure		Hello Games	
August 27	The Legend of Heroes: Trails into Reverie (JP)	PS4		RPG		Nihon Falcom	
August 27	Moon: Remix RPG Adventure	NS		RPG		Onion Games	
August 27	Surgeon Simulator 2	WIN		Simulation		Bossa Studios	
August 27	Tell Me Why: Chapter One	WIN, XBO		Adventure		Xbox Game Studios	
August 28	Captain Tsubasa: Rise of New Champions	WIN, NS, PS4		Sports		Bandai Namco Entertainment	
August 28	Drake Hollow	XBO		Action-adventure		The Molasses Flood	
August 28	Immortal Realms: Vampire Wars	WIN, NS, PS4, XBO		Strategy		Kalypso Media	
August 28	Jump Force: Deluxe Edition	NS		Fighting		Bandai Namco Entertainment	
August 28	Madden NFL 21	WIN, PS4, XBO		Sports		EA Sports	
August 28	Project CARS 3	WIN, PS4, XBO		Racing (sim)		Bandai Namco Entertainment	
August 28	Wasteland 3	WIN, PS4, XBO		RPG		Deep Silver	
August 28	Windbound	WIN, NS, PS4, XBO, Stadia		Adventure		Deep Silver	
September 1	Ary and the Secret of Seasons	WIN, NS, PS4, XBO		Action-adventure		Modus Games	
September 1	Crusader Kings III	WIN, OSX, LIN		Grand strategy		Paradox Interactive	
September 1	Iron Harvest	WIN, PS4, XBO		RTS		Deep Silver	
September 1	MX vs. ATV All Out	NS		Racing		THQ Nordic	
September 1	Super Bomberman R Online	Stadia		Action, Battle royale		Konami	
September 3	Phoenotopia: Awakening (EU)	NS		Action-adventure, Metroidvania, Platformer		Cape Cosmic	
September 3	Spellbreak	WIN, NS, PS4, XBO		Battle royale		Proletariat	
September 3	Super Mario All-Stars	NS		Platformer			
September 3	Tell Me Why: Chapter Two	WIN, XBO		Adventure		Xbox Game Studios	
September 3	WRC 9	WIN, PS4, XBO		Racing		Nacon	
September 4	Doraemon Story of Seasons	PS4		Farming, RPG		Bandai Namco Entertainment	
September 4	Marvel's Avengers	WIN, PS4, XBO, Stadia	Original	Action-adventure		Square Enix	
September 4	NBA 2K21	WIN, NS, PS4, XBO, Stadia		Sports		2K Sports	
September 4	Tony Hawk's Pro Skater 1 + 2	WIN, PS4, XBO		Sports		Activision	
September 4	World's End Club	iOS		Action-adventure		IzanagiGames	
September 8	AVICII Invector	NS		Music		Wired Productions	
September 8	Kingdoms of Amalur: Re-Reckoning	WIN, PS4, XBO		Action RPG, Hack and slash		THQ Nordic	
September 8	Star Renegades	WIN		RPG		Raw Fury	
September 10	Metal Max Xeno: Reborn (JP)	PS4		RPG		Kadokawa Games	
September 10	Tell Me Why: Chapter Three	WIN, XBO		Adventure		Xbox Game Studios	
September 10	Vampire: The Masquerade – Shadows of New York	WIN, OSX, LIN, NS, PS4, XBO		Visual novel		Draw Distance	
September 15	BPM: Bullets Per Minute	WIN		FPS, Roguelike, Rhythm		Awe Interactive	
September 15	Fight Crab	NS		Fighting		Nussoft	
September 15	Leisure Suit Larry: Wet Dreams Don't Dry	XBO		Adventure		Assemble Entertainment	
September 15	Spelunky 2	PS4		Platformer, Roguelike		Mossmouth	
September 17	Azur Lane: Crosswave (JP)	NS		Shoot 'em up		Compile Heart	
September 17	Hades	WIN, NS		Roguelike		Supergiant Games	
September 17	Ori and the Will of the Wisps	NS		Platformer, Adventure, Metroidvania		Xbox Game Studios	
September 17	Welcome to Elk	WIN, XBO		Adventure		Triple Topping	
September 17	Wingspan	WIN, OSX		Digital tabletop		Monster Couch, Stonemaier Games	
September 18	Biped	XBO		Puzzle-platformer		META Publishing	
September 18	Commandos 2 - HD Remaster	PS4, XBO		RTT		Kalypso Media	
September 18	Crysis Remastered	WIN, PS4, XBO		FPS		Crytek	
September 18	Praetorians - HD Remaster	PS4, XBO		RTT		Kalypso Media	
September 18	Super Mario 3D All-Stars	NS		Platformer		Nintendo	
September 18	WWE 2K Battlegrounds	WIN, NS, PS4, XBO, Stadia		Sports		2K Sports	
September 22	13 Sentinels: Aegis Rim	PS4		Adventure, RTS		Atlus	
September 23	Art of Rally	WIN, OSX, LIN		Racing		Funselektor Labs	
September 23	Donkey Kong Country 2: Diddy's Kong Quest	NS		Platformer			
September 23	Fire Emblem: Monshō no Nazo (JP)	NS		Tactical RPG			
September 23	Kirby Fighters 2	NS		Fighting		Nintendo	
September 23	Mario's Super Picross	NS		Puzzle			
September 23	The Peace Keepers	NS		Brawler			
September 23	S.C.A.T.: Special Cybernetic Attack Team	NS		Shoot 'em up			
September 24	Date A Live: Ren Dystopia (JP)	PS4		Visual novel		Compile Heart	
September 24	Dungreed	NS, PS4		Action		Pikii	
September 24	Ginga Force	WIN, PS4		Shoot 'em up		Rising Star Games	
September 24	RollerCoaster Tycoon 3: Complete Edition	WIN, NS		CMS		Frontier Developments	
September 24	Serious Sam 4	WIN, Stadia		FPS		Devolver Digital	
September 24	Tennis World Tour 2	WIN, PS4, XBO		Sports		Nacon	
September 24	Vampire: The Masquerade – Night Road	WIN, OSX, LIN, iOS, DROID, WEB		Interactive fiction		Choice of Games	
September 25	Mafia: Definitive Edition	WIN, PS4, XBO	Remake	Action-adventure		2K Games	
September 25	Panzer Dragoon: Remake	WIN		Shoot 'em up (rail)		Forever Entertainment	
September 28	Genshin Impact	WIN, PS4, iOS, DROID		Action RPG		miHoYo	
September 28	Panzer Dragoon: Remake	PS4		Shoot 'em up (rail)		Forever Entertainment	
September 29	Re:Turn – One Way Trip	WIN, NS, PS4, XBO		Adventure		Green Man Gaming	
September 29	Spelunky 2	WIN		Platformer, Roguelike		Mossmouth	
September 29	Umihara Kawase BaZooKa!!	NS, PS4		Action		ININ Games	
September 29	The Walking Dead Onslaught	WIN, PS4		Survival horror		Survios	
September 29	WARSAW	PS4		TBS		Crunching Koalas	

=== October–December ===
Release date	Title	Platform	Type	Genre	Developer	Publisher	Ref.
October 1	Super Mario Bros. 35	NS		Platformer, Battle royale		Nintendo	
October 1	WARSAW	NS		TBS		Crunching Koalas	
October 2	Crash Bandicoot 4: It's About Time	PS4, XBO		Platformer		Activision	
October 2	Star Wars: Squadrons	WIN, PS4, XBO		Vehicle sim (spaceship)		Electronic Arts	
October 2	WARSAW	XBO		TBS		Crunching Koalas	
October 6	Nickelodeon Kart Racers 2: Grand Prix	PS4, XBO, NS		Racing		GameMill Entertainment	
October 6	Overcrowd: A Commute 'Em Up	WIN		CMS		SquarePlay Games	
October 8	I Am Dead	WIN, OSX, NS		Adventure, Puzzle		Annapurna Interactive	
October 8	Ikenfell	WIN, NS, PS4, XBO		Tactical RPG		Humble Bundle	
October 8	Ride 4	WIN, PS4, XBO		Racing		Milestone	
October 9	Ben 10: Power Trip	WIN, NS, PS4, XBO		Action		Outright Games	
October 9	FIFA 21	WIN, NS, PS4, XBO		Sports		EA Sports	
October 9	The Survivalists	WIN, macOS, tvOS, iOS, NS, PS4, XBO		Sandbox, Survival		Team17	
October 13	G.I. Joe: Operation Blackout	WIN, NS, PS4, XBO		TPS		GameMill Entertainment	
October 13	Remothered: Broken Porcelain	WIN, NS, PS4, XBO		Adventure, Survival horror		Darril Arts	
October 13	Robotics;Notes DaSH	WIN, NS, PS4		Visual novel		Spike Chunsoft	
October 13	Robotics;Notes Elite	WIN, NS, PS4		Visual novel		Spike Chunsoft	
October 13	Torchlight III	WIN, PS4, XBO		Action RPG		Perfect World Entertainment	
October 13	Werewolf: The Apocalypse – Heart of the Forest	WIN, OSX, LIN		Visual novel, RPG		Walkabout Games	
October 14	Cook, Serve, Delicious! 3	WIN, NS, PS4, XBO		Simulation		Vertigo Gaming	
October 15	Age of Empires III: Definitive Edition	WIN		RTS		Xbox Game Studios	
October 15	Batbarian: Testament of the Primordials	WIN, NS		Platformer, Adventure, Metroidvania		Dangen Entertainment	
October 15	Big Brother: The Game	iOS, DROID		Simulation, RPG		9th Impact	
October 15	Cake Bash	WIN, PS4, XBO, Stadia		Fighting, Party		Coatsink	
October 15	Cloudpunk	NS, PS4, XBO		Adventure		Merge Games	
October 15	The Jackbox Party Pack 7	WIN, NS, PS4, XBO		Party		Jackbox Games	
October 15	Noita	WIN		Platformer, Roguelike		Nolla Games	
October 15	Shantae: Risky's Revenge – Director's Cut	NS, XBO		Platformer, Metroidvania		WayForward Technologies	
October 15	Tennis World Tour 2	NS		Sports		Nacon	
October 16	The Collage Atlas	iOS		Adventure		Robot House	
October 16	Crown Trick	WIN, NS		Roguelike, RPG		Team17	
October 16	Mario Kart Live: Home Circuit	NS		Racing		Nintendo	
October 16	NHL 21	PS4, XBO		Sports		EA Sports	
October 16	Postal Redux	NS		Shoot 'em up		MD Games	
October 16	Zoids Wild: Blast Unleashed	NS		Action		Outright Games	
October 20	Amnesia: Rebirth	WIN, PS4		Survival horror		Frictional Games	
October 21	Rogue	WIN		Roguelike		Pixel Games UK	
October 21	Tenderfoot Tactics	WIN, OSX, LIN		Tactical RPG		Ice Water Games	
October 22	Bless Unleashed	PS4		MMO, RPG		Bandai Namco Entertainment, Neowiz	
October 22	Disc Room	WIN, NS		Puzzle-platformer		Devolver Digital	
October 22	If Found...	NS		Adventure		Annapurna Interactive	
October 22	The Red Lantern	WIN, NS		Adventure, Survival		Timberline Studio	
October 22	Torchlight III	NS		Action RPG		Perfect World Entertainment	
October 23	Leisure Suit Larry: Wet Dreams Dry Twice	WIN, OSX		Adventure		Assemble Entertainment	
October 23	Monster Prom 2: Monster Camp	WIN, OSX, LIN		Dating sim		Beautiful Glitch	
October 23	Transformers: Battlegrounds	WIN, NS, PS4, XBO		Tactical RPG		Outright Games	
October 27	Cobra Kai: The Karate Kid Saga Continues	NS, PS4, XBO		Brawler		GameMill Entertainment	
October 27	Ghostrunner	WIN, PS4, XBO		Action		505 Games, All In! Games	
October 27	The Legend of Heroes: Trails of Cold Steel IV	PS4		RPG		NIS America	
October 27	Oddworld: New 'n' Tasty!	NS		Cinematic platformer		Oddworld Inhabitants	
October 27	Stories Untold	PS4, XBO		Adventure, Puzzle		Devolver Digital	
October 28	beatmania IIDX 28 BISTROVER	Arcade		Rhythm		Konami	
October 28	Control: Ultimate Edition – Cloud Version	NS		Action-adventure, TPS		505 Games	
October 28	The Last Blade: Beyond the Destiny	NS		Fighting		SNK	
October 28	No More Heroes	NS		Action-adventure, Hack and slash		Xseed Games	
October 28	No More Heroes 2: Desperate Struggle	NS		Action-adventure, Hack and slash		Xseed Games	
October 28	Part Time UFO	NS		Puzzle		Nintendo	
October 28	Transient	WIN, PS4, XBO		Adventure		Stormlight Studios	
October 29	Pacer	WIN, PS4, XBO		Racing		R8 Games	
October 29	Shin Megami Tensei III: Nocturne HD Remaster (JP)	NS, PS4		RPG		Atlus	
October 29	Watch Dogs: Legion	WIN, PS4, XBO, Stadia	Original	Action-adventure		Ubisoft	
October 29	Xuan-Yuan Sword VII	WW: WIN; AS: PS4		Action RPG		Softstar	
October 30	Angry Video Game Nerd I & II Deluxe	WIN, NS		Action-adventure		Screenwave Media Inc.	
October 30	The Dark Pictures Anthology: Little Hope	WIN, PS4, XBO	Original	Interactive drama, Survival horror		Bandai Namco Entertainment	
October 30	Mad Rat Dead	NS, PS4		Rhythm, Platformer		NIS America	
October 30	Pikmin 3 Deluxe	NS		RTS		Nintendo	
October 30	Umihara Kawase Fresh!	PS4		Platformer		Nicalis	
October 30	Visage	WIN, PS4, XBO		Survival horror		SadSquare Studio	
November 3	Bakugan: Champions of Vestroia	NS		Action RPG		Warner Bros. Interactive Entertainment	
November 3	Jurassic World Evolution: Complete Edition	NS		Business sim		Frontier Developments	
November 4	Söldner-X 2: Final Prototype Definitive Edition	PS4		Shoot 'em up		Eastasiasoft	
November 5	Chicken Police: Paint It Red!	WIN, NS, PS4, XBO		Visual novel, Adventure		HandyGames	
November 5	Shadowverse: Champion's Battle (JP)	NS		DCCG, RPG		Cygames	
November 6	Descenders	NS		Sports		No More Robots	
November 6	Dirt 5	WIN, PS4, XBO		Racing		Codemasters	
November 6	Need for Speed: Hot Pursuit Remastered	WIN, PS4, XBO		Racing		Electronic Arts	
November 6	Tropico 6	NS		Simulation		Kalypso Media	
November 10	Ark: Survival Evolved	XBX/S		Action-adventure, Survival		Studio Wildcard	
November 10	Assassin's Creed Valhalla	WIN, PS4, XBO, XBX/S, Stadia	Original	Action RPG		Ubisoft	
November 10	Borderlands 3	XBX/S		Action RPG, FPS		2K Games	
November 10	Bright Memory	XBX/S		FPS		Playism	
November 10	Dead by Daylight	XBX/S		Survival horror		Behaviour Interactive	
November 10	Destiny 2: Beyond Light	WIN, PS4, XBO		FPS		Bungie	
November 10	Devil May Cry 5: Special Edition	XBX/S		Action-adventure, Hack and slash		Capcom	
November 10	Dirt 5	XBX/S		Racing		Codemasters	
November 10	Enlisted	XBX/S		FPS		Gaijin Entertainment	
November 10	Evergate	XBO, XBX/S		Puzzle-platformer		Stone Lantern Games LLC, PQube Limited	
November 10	The Falconeer	WIN, XBO, XBX/S		Simulation		Wired Productions	
November 10	Fortnite	XBX/S		Battle royale		Epic Games	
November 10	Forza Horizon 4	XBX/S		Racing		Xbox Game Studios	
November 10	Fuser	WIN, OSX, NS, PS4, XBO		Rhythm		NCSoft	
November 10	Gears 5	XBX/S		TPS		Xbox Game Studios	
November 10	Gears Tactics	XBO, XBX/S		TBT		Xbox Game Studios	
November 10	Maneater	XBX/S		Action RPG		Deep Silver	
November 10	Manifold Garden	XBX/S		Action-adventure		William Chyr Studio	
November 10	NBA 2K21	XBX/S		Sports		2K Sports	
November 10	No Man's Sky	XBX/S		Action-adventure, Survival		Hello Games	
November 10	Observer: System Redux	WIN, XBX/S		Survival horror		Aspyr	
November 10	Ori and the Will of the Wisps	XBX/S		Platformer, Adventure, Metroidvania		Xbox Game Studios	
November 10	Overcooked: All You Can Eat	XBX/S		Simulation		Team17	
November 10	Planet Coaster: Console Edition	PS4, XBO, XBX/S		CMS		Frontier Developments	
November 10	Rogue Company	XBX/S		TPS		Hi-Rez Studios	
November 10	Sakuna: Of Rice and Ruin	WIN, NS, PS4		Action, Simulation		Xseed Games	
November 10	Sea of Thieves	XBX/S		Action-adventure		Xbox Game Studios	
November 10	Spacelords	XBX/S		Action-adventure		MercurySteam	
November 10	Tetris Effect: Connected	XBO, XBX/S		Puzzle		Enhance Games	
November 10	Warhammer: Chaosbane	XBX/S		Action RPG, Hack and slash		Nacon	
November 10	Watch Dogs: Legion	XBX/S		Action-adventure		Ubisoft	
November 10	XIII	WIN, PS4, XBO		FPS, Stealth		Microids	
November 10	Yakuza: Like a Dragon	WIN, PS4, XBO, XBX/S		RPG		Sega	
November 12	Assassin's Creed Valhalla	PS5		Action RPG		Ubisoft	
November 12	Astro's Playroom	PS5		Platformer		Sony Interactive Entertainment	
November 12	Borderlands 3	PS5		Action RPG, FPS		2K Games	
November 12	Bugsnax	OSX, PS4, PS5		Adventure		Young Horses	
November 12	Dead by Daylight	PS5		Survival horror		Behaviour Interactive	
November 12	Death Come True	PS4		Adventure		IzanagiGames	
November 12	Demon's Souls	PS5		Action RPG		Sony Interactive Entertainment	
November 12	Devil May Cry 5: Special Edition	PS5		Action-adventure, Hack and slash		Capcom	
November 12	Dirt 5	PS5		Racing		Codemasters	
November 12	Fortnite	PS5		Battle royale		Epic Games	
November 12	Godfall	WIN, PS5		Action RPG		Gearbox Publishing	
November 12	Just Dance 2021	NS, PS4, XBO, Stadia		Rhythm		Ubisoft	
November 12	Maneater	PS5		Action RPG		Deep Silver	
November 12	NBA 2K21	PS5		Sports		2K Sports	
November 12	No Man's Sky	PS5		Action-adventure, Survival		Hello Games	
November 12	Observer: System Redux	PS5		Survival horror		Aspyr	
November 12	Overcooked: All You Can Eat	PS5		Simulation		Team17	
November 12	The Pathless	WIN, PS4, PS5, iOS		Action-adventure		Annapurna Interactive	
November 12	Planet Coaster: Console Edition	PS5		CMS		Frontier Developments	
November 12	Sackboy: A Big Adventure	PS4, PS5		Platformer		Sony Interactive Entertainment	
November 12	Spacelords	PS5		Action-adventure		MercurySteam	
November 12	Spider-Man: Miles Morales	PS4, PS5	Original	Action-adventure		Sony Interactive Entertainment	
November 12	Spider-Man: Remastered	PS5	Remaster	Action-adventure		Sony Interactive Entertainment	
November 12	Warhammer: Chaosbane	PS5		Action RPG, Hack and slash		Nacon	
November 12	Watch Dogs: Legion	PS5		Action-adventure		Ubisoft	
November 12	WRC 9	PS5		Racing		Nacon	
November 13	Call of Duty: Black Ops Cold War	WIN, PS4, PS5, XBO, XBX/S	Original	FPS		Activision	
November 13	Kingdom Hearts: Melody of Memory	NS, PS4, XBO		Rhythm		Square Enix	
November 13	Need for Speed: Hot Pursuit Remastered	NS		Racing		Electronic Arts	
November 17	Bubble Bobble 4 Friends: The Baron is Back	PS4, NS		Platformer		ININ Games	
November 17	Halo: The Master Chief Collection	XBX/S		FPS		Xbox Game Studios	
November 17	Mars Horizon	WIN, NS, PS4, XBO		Vehicle sim (spaceship)		Auroch Digital	
November 17	Mortal Kombat 11 Ultimate	WIN, NS, PS4, PS5, XBO, XBX/S		Fighting		Warner Bros. Interactive Entertainment	
November 17	Serious Sam Collection	NS, PS4, XBO		FPS		Devolver Digital	
November 17	Sniper Elite 4	NS		Tactical shooter		Rebellion Developments	
November 18	Seven Knights 2 (KR)	iOS, DROID		MMORPG	Netmarble Nexus	Netmarble	
November 19	Bridge Constructor: The Walking Dead	DROID, iOS, WIN, OSX, LIN, NS, PS4, XBO, XBX/S		Simulation, Puzzle		Headup Games	
November 19	Bubble Bobble 4 Friends: The Baron is Back (JP)	PS4		Platformer		Taito	
November 19	Cake Bash	NS		Fighting, Party		Coatsink	
November 19	Momotaro Dentetsu: Showa, Heisei, Reiwa Mo Teiban! (JP)	NS		Digital tabletop		Konami Digital Entertainment	
November 19	Mortal Kombat 11 Ultimate	Stadia		Fighting		Warner Bros. Interactive Entertainment	
November 19	Star Renegades	NS, XBO		RPG		Raw Fury	
November 20	Hyrule Warriors: Age of Calamity	NS		Hack and slash		Nintendo	
November 20	Katamari Damacy Reroll	PS4, XBO		Puzzle, Action		Bandai Namco Entertainment	
November 23	World of Warcraft: Shadowlands	WIN, OSX		MMO, RPG		Blizzard Entertainment	
November 24	Just Dance 2021	PS5, XBX/S		Rhythm		Ubisoft	
November 25	Star Renegades	PS4		RPG		Raw Fury	
November 26	Phoenotopia: Awakening (JP)	NS		Action-adventure, Metroidvania, Platformer		Flyhigh Works	
November 26	Spirit of the North: Enhanced Edition	PS5		Adventure		Merge Games	
November 26	Warframe	PS5		Action RPG, TPS		Digital Extremes	
December 1	Chronos: Before the Ashes	WIN, NS, PS4, XBO, Stadia		Action RPG		THQ Nordic	
December 1	Empire of Sin	WIN, OSX, NS, PS4, XBO		Strategy		Paradox Interactive	
December 1	Football Manager 2021	WIN, XBO, XBX/S		Sports		Sega	
December 1	Frostpoint VR: Proving Grounds	Quest, Steam, Vive		FPS		Thirdverse	
December 1	Tom Clancy's Rainbow Six Siege	PS5, XBX/S		Tactical shooter		Ubisoft	
December 1	Twin Mirror	WIN, PS4, XBO		Adventure		Dontnod Entertainment	
December 1	Worms Rumble	WIN, PS4, PS5		Artillery, Battle royale		Team17	
December 2	Sam & Max Save the World Remastered	WIN, NS		Adventure		Skunkape Games	
December 2	Shiren the Wanderer: The Tower of Fortune and the Dice of Fate	WIN, NS		Roguelike, RPG		Spike Chunsoft	
December 2	State of Decay 2	XBX/S		Survival		Xbox Game Studios	
December 3	Absolute Drift	NS		Racing		Funselektor Labs	
December 3	Atelier Ryza 2: Lost Legends & the Secret Fairy (JP)	NS, PS4, PS5		RPG		Koei Tecmo	
December 3	Haven	WIN, PS5, XBO, XBX/S		Adventure, RPG		The Game Bakers	
December 3	Immortals Fenyx Rising	WIN, NS, PS4, PS5, XBO, XBX/S, Stadia		Action-adventure		Ubisoft	
December 3	Morbid: The Seven Acolytes	WIN, NS, PS4, XBO		Horror		Merge Games	
December 3	Phogs!	WIN, NS, PS4, XBO, Stadia		Adventure, Puzzle-platformer		Coatsink	
December 3	Startup Panic	DROID, iOS, WIN		Simulation		tinyBuild	
December 3	Taiko no Tatsujin: Rhythmic Adventure Pack!	NS		Rhythm		Bandai Namco Entertainment	
December 3	Wildfire	NS, PS4, XBO		Stealth		Humble Games	
December 4	Commandos 2 - HD Remaster	NS		RTT		Kalypso Media	
December 4	DARQ: Complete Edition	WIN, PS4, XBO		Horror (psych)		Feardemic	
December 4	Dragon Quest XI S: Definitive Edition	WIN, PS4, XBO		RPG		Square Enix	
December 4	FIFA 21	PS5, XBX/S		Sports		EA Sports	
December 4	Fire Emblem: Shadow Dragon and the Blade of Light	NS		Tactical RPG		Nintendo	
December 4	Fitness Boxing 2: Rhythm & Exercise	NS		Fitness, Rhythm		Nintendo	
December 4	John Wick Hex	NS, XBO		Action, Strategy		Good Shepherd Entertainment	
December 4	Madden NFL 21	PS5, XBX/S		Sports		EA Sports	
December 4	Punishing: Gray Raven (JP)	iOS, DROID		Action RPG, Hack and slash		Kuro Games	
December 4	Suzerain	WIN, OSX		Government sim		Fellow Traveller	
December 4	Tanuki Sunset	WIN		Racing		Rewind Games	
December 7	Drawn to Life: Two Realms	WIN, NS, iOS, DROID		Action-adventure, Platformer		505 Games	
December 8	Call of the Sea	WIN, XBO, XBX/S		Adventure, Puzzle		Raw Fury	
December 8	Destiny 2	PS5, XBX/S		FPS		Bungie	
December 8	Doom Eternal	NS		FPS		Bethesda Softworks	
December 8	Puyo Puyo Tetris 2	NS, PS4, PS5, XBO, XBX/S		Puzzle		Sega	
December 9	Ghostrunner	NS		Action		505 Games, All In! Games	
December 10	Brigandine: The Legend of Runersia	PS4		Tactical RPG		Happinet	
December 10	Cyberpunk 2077	WIN, PS4, XBO, Stadia		Action RPG		CD Projekt	
December 10	Orwell's Animal Farm	WIN, DROID		Adventure, Simulation, Strategy		The Dairymen	
December 10	Xuan-Yuan Sword VII (JP)	PS4		Action RPG		Softstar, Justdan International	
December 11	Medal of Honor: Above and Beyond	WIN		FPS		Electronic Arts	
December 11	Panzer Dragoon: Remake	XBO		Shoot 'em up (rail)		Forever Entertainment	
December 15	Among Us	NS		Party, Social deduction		Innersloth	
December 15	Collection of SaGa: Final Fantasy Legend	NS		RPG		Square Enix	
December 16	MXGP 2020	WIN, PS4, XBO		Racing		Milestone	
December 17	Abyss of the Sacrifice	WIN, NS		Adventure, Visual novel		D3 Publisher	
December 17	Deemo: Reborn	NS, iOS, DROID		Rhythm		Rayark	
December 17	Neptunia ReVerse (JP)	PS5		RPG		Compile Heart	
December 18	Donkey Kong Country 3: Dixie Kong's Double Trouble!	NS		Platformer			
December 18	The Ignition Factor	NS		Action			
December 18	Kunio-kun no Dodgeball da yo Zen'in Shūgō! (JP)	NS		Sports			
December 18	Nightshade	NS		Action-adventure			
December 18	Smash Ping Pong (JP)	NS		Sports			
December 18	Sugoi Hebereke (JP)	NS		Fighting			
December 18	Super Valis IV	NS		Action, Platformer			
December 18	Tuff E Nuff	NS		Fighting			
December 21	Double Dragon Neon	NS		Brawler		Majesco	
December 22	Override 2: Super Mech League	WIN, NS, PS4, PS5, XBO, XBX/S		Brawler		Modus Games	
December 23	Fatal Fury: First Contact	NS		Fighting		SNK	
December 23	Super Meat Boy Forever	WIN, NS		Platformer		Team Meat	
December 23	Who's Your Daddy?	WIN, OSX, XBO		Simulation		Joe Williams	
December 24	Earth Defense Force: World Brothers (JP)	NS, PS4		TPS		D3 Publisher	
December 25	Omori	WIN, OSX		RPG, Horror (psych)		Playism	
December 26	The Hong Kong Massacre	NS		Shoot 'em up		Untold Tales	
December 29	Wingspan	NS		Digital tabletop		Monster Couch, Stonemaier Games	
