= Small Soldiers =

1998 film by Joe Dante

- North American theatrical release poster
- Directed by: Joe Dante
- Written by: Gavin Scott; Adam Rifkin; Ted Elliott; Terry Rossio
- Produced by: Michael Finnell; Colin Wilson
- Starring: Kirsten Dunst; Gregory Smith; Jay Mohr; Phil Hartman; Kevin Dunn; Denis Leary; Frank Langella; Tommy Lee Jones
- Cinematography: Jamie Anderson
- Edited by: Marshall Havey; Michael Thau
- Music by: Jerry Goldsmith
- Production company: Amblin Entertainment
- Distributed by: DreamWorks Pictures (North America); Universal Pictures (International)
- Release dates: June 4, 1998 (United Kingdom); July 10, 1998 (United States)
- Running time: 110 minutes
- Country: United States
- Language: English
- Budget: $40 million
- Box office: $87.5 million

Small Soldiers is a 1998 American science fiction action comedy film directed by Joe Dante from a screenplay by Ted Elliott. It stars Kirsten Dunst and Gregory Smith, along with the voices of Frank Langella and Tommy Lee Jones. The film depicts two factions of action figures that gain sentience after being implanted with military microprocessors. One faction grows increasingly violent in its attempts to destroy the other, putting lives in danger.

Released on July 10, 1998, in the United States by DreamWorks Pictures, with Universal Pictures releasing in other territories, the film received mixed reviews from critics and was a moderate commercial success, grossing $87.5 million on a $40 million budget. Small Soldiers marks the last on-screen film role of Phil Hartman, who died two months before the film's American premiere, and is dedicated to his memory. Additionally, it marked the final film role of Clint Walker before his retirement.

== Plot ==
Seeking to diversify, defense contractor GloboTech Industries acquires the Heartland Toy Company. GloboTech CEO Gil Mars tasks his new employees, toy designers Larry Benson and Irwin Wayfair, with upgrading their existing products – a range of soldiers called the "Commando Elite" and a range of friendly monsters called "Gorgonites" – into advanced robots capable of "playing back". Faced with a tight deadline, Larry forgoes safety testing and uses GloboTech's X1000 microprocessor as the basis for the toys' programming.

Teenager Alan Abernathy takes a shipment of the toys at his family's toy store and unboxes the leaders, Chip Hazard (of the Commando Elite) and Archer (of the Gorgonites). Archer hides in Alan's backpack and goes home with him, leading Alan to discover that he is sentient. Meanwhile, Chip and his men make war on the Gorgonites, trashing the store in the process. Alan sees the aftermath of the struggle the following day and files a complaint with GloboTech. After receiving the complaint, Larry and Irwin discover that the X1000 was designed for smart munitions guidance and is programmed to learn over time. Mass production was scrapped due to issues with electromagnetic pulse shielding.

The Commandos pursue Alan to his house and attempt to kill him and Archer, but Alan fends them off. He tries to explain the situation to his parents, but is met with disbelief. The next day, Alan finds the remaining Gorgonites hiding in a dumpster at the store. He takes them home and learns that their goal is to reach their homeland of Gorgon, which they believe is in Yosemite National Park. Meanwhile, the Commandos learn of Alan's interest in his neighbor, Christy Fimple, by tapping his phone line. They invade Christy's home and take her hostage to force Alan into surrendering the Gorgonites.

Alan and Archer sneak into Christy's house to rescue her, but run into her Gwendy dolls, which the Commandos have engineered into auxiliary troops. The Gwendys quickly subdue Alan. Archer cuts Christy loose from her bonds, and together they save Alan and destroy the Gwendys before escaping. The Commandos pursue them in makeshift vehicles, but all except Chip are destroyed in a crash. The two teens return to Alan's house to find both their families waiting for them. As Alan tries to explain, Larry and Irwin arrive to warn them of the dangers of the X1000. At that moment, Chip launches a massive attack on the house with a new force of Commandos obtained from a hijacked toy shipment.

Following Larry and Irwin's advice, Alan climbs a nearby power pole in an attempt to engineer an electromagnetic pulse and disable the toys. Chip goes after him in a toy helicopter. Archer comes to Alan's aid, but Chip throws him to the ground. Alan then thrusts Chip into a transformer, triggering the pulse and destroying him and the remaining Commandos.

Mars arrives in his helicopter during the cleanup the next day. He pays Alan and Christy's families handsomely for their trouble and orders Larry and Irwin to repurpose the Commando Elite for military use. Alan and Christy part on amicable terms, having started dating. Alan later discovers that the Gorgonites survived the pulse by hiding beneath the Fimples' fallen satellite dish. He brings them to Yosemite National Park and sends them out in a toy boat to find their home of Gorgon.

== Cast ==
- Gregory Smith as Alan Abernathy, a boy who befriends the Gorgonites
- Kirsten Dunst as Christy Fimple, Alan's love interest
- David Cross as Irwin Wayfair, a toy developer at Heartland Toy Company and creator of the Gorgonites
- Jay Mohr as Larry Benson, a toy developer at Heartland Toy Company and creator of the Commando Elite
- Denis Leary as Gil Mars, the CEO of GloboTech Industries
- Alexandra Wilson as Ms. Kegel, Mars's personal assistant
- Kevin Dunn as Stuart Abernathy, Alan's father, who runs a toy store
- Ann Magnuson as Irene Abernathy, Alan's mother
- Phil Hartman as Phil Fimple, Christy's father
- Wendy Schaal as Marion Fimple, Christy's mother
- Jacob Smith as Timmy Fimple, Christy's younger brother
- Jonathan Bouck as Brad, Christy's boyfriend
- Dick Miller as Joe, a delivery driver for Heartland Toy Company
- Robert Picardo as Ralph Quist, a technician at GloboTech
- Belinda Balaski as Neighbor
- Rance Howard as Husband
- Jackie Joseph as Wife

=== Voice cast ===
==== Gorgonites ====
- Frank Langella as Archer, the lion-like emissary and leader of the Gorgonites
- Christopher Guest as:
  - Slamfist, a hunchbacked, troll/ogre-like Gorgonite
  - Scratch-It, a small, frog-like Gorgonite
- Michael McKean as:
  - Insaniac, a spinning, hyperactive Gorgonite
  - Troglokhan, a Frankenstein-like Gorgonite
- Harry Shearer as Punch-It, a rhino-like Gorgonite

Also featured is Ocula, a mute Gorgonite taking the form of a three-legged eyeball.

==== Commando Elite ====
- Tommy Lee Jones as Major Chip Hazard, leader of the Commando Elite
- Jim Brown as Butch Meathook, a sniper
- Ernest Borgnine as Kip Killigan, a covert operations specialist
- George Kennedy as Brick Bazooka, an artilleryman
- Clint Walker as Nick Nitro, a demolitions specialist
- Bruce Dern as Link Static, a communications specialist

==== Others ====
- Sarah Michelle Gellar and Christina Ricci as the Gwendy dolls owned by Christy
- Marcia Mitzman Gaven as Globotech Announcer

Excluding Jones and Dern, the Commando Elite are voiced by cast members from the 1967 film The Dirty Dozen. Dern replaced The Dirty Dozen actor Richard Jaeckel, who died before shooting began. Excluding Langella, the Gorgonites are voiced by cast members from the 1984 film This Is Spinal Tap.

Miller and Balaski previously appeared in Joe Dante's films Piranha and The Howling. Also in The Howling was Picardo, whose character in Small Soldiers shares a surname with Eddie Quist, his character in that film.

Small Soldiers was Hartman's last on-screen role before his death, and the film is dedicated to his memory.

== Production ==
On making the film, director Joe Dante recalled, "Originally I was told to make an edgy picture for teenagers, but when the sponsor tie-ins came in the new mandate was to soften it up as a kiddie movie. Too late, as it turned out, and there are elements of both approaches in there. Just before release it was purged of a lot of action and explosions." For the film's effects shots, Dante stated that the original idea was to use mostly puppets provided by Stan Winston. However, Dante said that while shooting, it was "much simpler and cheaper" to use computer-generated imagery (CGI) after the scenes had been shot, so the film is "one-third puppetry and the rest CGI."

== Release ==
=== Promotion ===
In November 1997 (the month Small Soldiers began shooting) DreamWorks partnered with FreeZone, a youth-focused online platform, to create interactive websites for three of its upcoming films: Small Soldiers, Paulie, and Mouse Hunt. Mouse Hunt had completed shooting in July 1997 and would be released in December 1997, while Paulie had finished shooting the previous month and was in post-production, eventually being released in April 1998. The collaboration was intended to serve as an online promotional campaign, with each film receiving its own dedicated site featuring games, film clips, and contests. The website for Mouse Hunt was the first of the three to launch.

=== Box office ===
Small Soldiers opened in 2,539 theaters and earned $14 million on its opening weekend, ranking third behind Lethal Weapon 4 and Armageddon. At the end of its theatrical run, the film grossed $55.1 million in the United States and Canada and $16.6 million internationally, totaling in $71.8 million worldwide.

=== Lawsuit ===
In 2000, filmmaker Gregory P. Grant filed a suit against Steven Spielberg, DreamWorks Pictures and Universal Pictures, alleging that they had infringed on the copyright of his 1990 short film Ode to GI Joe. Grant claimed that he had met with Amblin Entertainment in 1991 to discuss the potential to expand his short film into a full feature. The project went as far as commissioning a treatment from Grant and a 16mm copy of the short film at Spielberg's request but, according to Grant, Amblin dropped the project. However, Grant added that Amblin pushed another film, at the time titled Toy Soldiers, into development nearly a month after Grant's project was passed on. Grant's attorneys stressed that several scenes and ideas from Small Soldiers were too similar and taken outright from Grant's short film and treatment.

== Reception ==
Rotten Tomatoes, a review aggregator, reports that 48% of 44 surveyed critics gave the film a positive review; the average score is of 6.2/10. The critical consensus states, "Small Soldiers has plenty of visual razzle-dazzle, but the rote story proves disappointingly deficient in director Joe Dante's trademark anarchic spirit." Audiences polled by CinemaScore gave the film an average grade of B+ on an A+ to F scale.

Roger Ebert gave the film 2.5 out of 4 stars, saying it was well-made with excellent effects but he disliked how it was "a family picture on the outside, and a mean, violent action picture on the inside." Adults could probably appreciate the film's inside jokes with the voice casting and the storytelling ambiguities. Yet for younger children, "this could be a terrifying experience." Caroline Westbrook of Empire Magazine gave the film 3 out of 5 stars and said: "It's Gremlins with toy soldiers, except not quite as dark or funny."

== Merchandise ==
A soundtrack consisting of classic rock songs remixed by contemporary hip-hop artists was released on July 7, 1998, by DreamWorks Records. It peaked at 103 on the Billboard 200. The film score was composed and conducted by veteran composer Jerry Goldsmith. In addition, a video game based on the film was developed by DreamWorks Interactive and released by Electronic Arts on September 30, 1998. Kenner Products (a subsidiary of Hasbro) produced a line of toys, which featured the Gorgonites and the Commando Elite.

The 2020 shooter game Hypercharge: Unboxed, developed by Digital Cybercherries, drew inspiration from Small Soldiers. The development team conceived the game's idea while watching the movie on television.

=== Video games ===
Four video games were released in 1998:

- Small Soldiers – PlayStation (Electronic Arts/DreamWorks Interactive)
- Small Soldiers: Squad Commander – PC (Hasbro Interactive/DreamWorks Interactive)
- Small Soldiers – Game Boy (THQ/Tiertex Design Studios/DreamWorks Interactive)
- Small Soldiers: Globotech Design Lab – PC (Hasbro Interactive)

== Film rating controversy ==
Burger King created a line of kids' meal toys to promote Small Soldiers. They were met with some controversy after the film received a PG-13 rating from the Motion Picture Association of America. Burger King executives claimed this caught the company by surprise as they were led to believe the film would receive no higher than a PG rating. According to Joe Dante, the film received a PG-13 rating due to the scene in which the Commandos put drugs in Phil and Marion's drink. The pamphlet accompanying the toys included the disclaimer "While toys are suitable for children of all ages, the movie Small Soldiers may contain material that is inappropriate for younger children". Some restaurants accepted an exchange for Mr. Potato Head toys.

== Home media ==
In North America, the film was released on VHS and DVD in December 1998 by DreamWorks Home Entertainment. During 1999, it also received LaserDisc releases in the US, the UK, France and Japan. All of these non-US LaserDisc releases were handled by Universal Home Entertainment, with the US LaserDisc handled by DreamWorks Home Entertainment.

Paramount Home Entertainment released the film on Blu-ray in the US on February 2, 2021. Paramount Home Entertainment then released a 4K Ultra HD steelbook edition on July 25, 2025. In North America, Paramount made the film available on its subscription streaming service Paramount+, as well as on its free streaming service Pluto TV.

Universal Pictures Home Entertainment (via NBCUniversal Entertainment Japan) released the film on Blu-ray in Japan on October 7, 2022.

== In other media ==
A soundtrack containing classic rock blended with hip hop was released on July 7, 1998 by DreamWorks Records. It peaked at 103 on the Billboard 200. The film score was composed and conducted by veteran composer Jerry Goldsmith. In addition, a video game based on the film was developed by DreamWorks Interactive and released by Electronic Arts on September 30, 1998. Kenner Products (a subsidiary of Hasbro) produced a line of toys, which featured the Gorgonites and the Commando Elite.

An unofficial, fanmade proof-of-concept trailer for a hypothetical reboot of the franchise made using Unreal Engine 5, subtitled War for the Nekron, was released on YouTube in 2023.

== Cancelled remake ==
A remake of Small Soldiers was in development by 20th Century Fox called Toymageddon. The script was purchased in January 2014, and director Justin Lin was set to produce the film. The story was described to be set in a "toy factory that begins to run amok." At that time it was not explicitly stated to be a remake of Small Soldiers.

Due to the acquisition of 21st Century Fox by Disney on March 20, 2019, Disney later in August cancelled the film along with over 200 other projects, which revealed the film was intended as a remake of Small Soldiers.
