= Joe Henson (video game designer) =

British video game developer

- Born: United Kingdom
- Other name: Indie Game Joe
- Occupation: Video game designer
- Notable work: Paranormal Tales; Don't Scream

Joe Henson is a British video game designer and marketing consultant. His projects include Don't Scream and Paranormal Tales.

== Career ==
Joe Henson is a game designer and marketing consultant currently serving as the Creative Gameplay and Marketing Director at British independent developer Digital Cybercherries. Henson's entry into the gaming industry was driven by his passion for video games.

After leaving school at 15, Henson began working full-time as a painter and decorator in his family’s business. In his early teens, he started creating fan websites for his favorite games, which led to building connections with game developers. By his early twenties, these connections evolved into friendships, and in 2015, he helped start the indie studio Digital Cybercherries with his close friends.

While working in the family business, Henson continued to contribute to Digital Cybercherries. His work contributed to projects like New Retro Arcade: Neon and Hypercharge: Unboxed.

In 2020, he transitioned fully into the gaming industry by founding his own company, Indie Game Joe, where he assists indie developers with marketing their games while maintaining his role at Digital Cybercherries.

Henson's first commercial game, Don't Scream, was released in Steam Early Access for Microsoft Windows in October 2023. In 2022, Henson announced that his game, Paranormal Tales would be published and co-developed by Digital Cybercherries. Paranormal Tales is slated for a 2024 release.

== Accolades ==
In 2019, Henson was nominated for Community Manager of the Year at the Social Media Marketing Awards UK. In 2024, he won a Shorty Award for Best Launch Campaign for his work on Don't Scream.

== Games ==
Title	Released	Role(s)
New Retro Arcade: Neon	2016	Marketing director
Hypercharge: Unboxed	2020	Creative gameplay and marketing director
Don't Scream	2023	Founder and game designer
Paranormal Tales	Upcoming	Founder and creative gameplay designer
