= Paranormal Tales =

Upcoming horror game

- Developer: Digital Cybercherries
- Publisher: Digital Cybercherries
- Designers: Joe Henson; Dec Doyle; Ulrich Gollick; Nick Watkinson; Josh Lennen; Andrew Hielscher
- Engine: Unreal Engine 5
- Platform: Windows
- Genre: Survival horror
- Mode: Single-player

Paranormal Tales is an upcoming indie horror video game developed in Unreal Engine 5, known for its use of found footage as a core gameplay mechanic. It was officially announced on October 25, 2022 and has attracted attention for its hyper-realistic visuals and use of bodycam footage. The game is a collaborative effort between its original creator, British video game designer and marketing consultant Joe Henson (video game designer) and Digital Cybercherries, which announced its partnership for the game's publication and development on November 10, 2022.

== Gameplay ==
The game introduces players to the harrowing stories of individuals who have mysteriously disappeared. Through the lens of found footage—sourced from bodycams, smartphones, and VHS cameras—players will navigate through each narrative. Paranormal Tales is distinguished by its gameplay mechanics, including facial recognition, dynamic breathing, interactive household objects, realistic movement impairments such as stumbling during sprints, and the inclusion of jump scares to heighten the horror experience.

== Reception ==
Since its announcement, Paranormal Tales has garnered significant attention for its utilization of bodycam footage to deliver a realistic horror experience. Its hyper-realistic visuals, powered by Unreal Engine 5, have also contributed to the anticipation surrounding its release.

== Release date ==
The game is set to be released on PC and has been listed on Steam, although an official release date has not yet been announced.
