= Small Soldiers (video game) =

1998 video game

- PAL cover art
- Developer: DreamWorks Interactive
- Publisher: Electronic Arts
- Composer: Michael Giacchino
- Platform: PlayStation
- Release: NA: November 2, 1998; PAL: November 13, 1998
- Genre: Action
- Modes: Single-player, multiplayer

Small Soldiers is an action video game loosely based on the film of the same name. Unrelated games were released for Windows and Game Boy.

== Plot ==
The video game does not follow the plot of the film of the same name, instead is based on the fictional world of Gorgon, where the characters are living beings, rather than animatronic toys. This is of note, as the driving force of the Gorgonites is to find Gorgon, a mythical world of peace and freedom. The Gorgonites originally come from a variety of planets, one per race, with the "Land of Gorgon" being something of a creation myth.

The game begins with the Commando Elite having already invaded Gorgon and ready to strike. Archer, as leader, takes it upon himself to fight the enemy head on. This is again notable, as the core programming of the Gorgonite toys in the movie is to "hide and be defeated by the Commando Elite", and they are a canonically passive tribe (pro-Commando marketing aside).

While the game begins with a pre-rendered cutscene, there is very little plot beyond the mission objectives, and the game ends on a static image.

== Gameplay ==
The game is a 3D, third-person shooter with tank controls. Players take the role of Archer, Emissary of the Gorgonites, as he battles against the forces of the game's antagonist, Major Chip Hazard, leader of the Commando Elite. You progress through small, open levels, collecting keys to progress to the next level, while defending yourself against enemies. The player is equipped with a rapid-fire crossbow, which can receive new ammunition types to modify gameplay. Players can also use turrets and vehicles, as well as summon allies in two-player mode.

=== Multiplayer ===
In multiplayer mode, players can play as either Archer or Chip Hazard. The gameplay is the same as single-player. For Chip Hazard his default weapon is a rapid-fire pistol, which can receive new ammunition types.

There are two game modes in multiplayer mode; frag mode where a player must score five kills before the other player does so and flag mode; where a player must return all three flags to their base.

== Reception ==
Reception

Review scores
Publication	Score
Game Informer	7.25/10
Pittsburgh Post-Gazette	3.5/5

Game Informer gave the game an overall score of 7.25 out of 10, praising the challenging action and easy puzzles but criticizing the gameplay controls, especially when the player gets stuck on invisible barriers concluding it is "fun, but it's nothing to get excited about."
