= Vampire: The Masquerade – Coteries of New York =

2019 video game

- Key art, featuring the vampire Sophie Langley
- Developer: Draw Distance
- Publisher: Draw Distance
- Designer: Krzysztof Zięba
- Writer: Krzysztof Zięba
- Composers: Arkadiusz Reikowski; Brunon Lubas
- Series: Vampire: The Masquerade
- Platforms: Windows; Linux; macOS; Nintendo Switch; PlayStation 4; Xbox One
- Release: Windows; December 11, 2019; Linux, macOS; January 23, 2020; Nintendo Switch; March 24, 2020; PlayStation 4; March 25, 2020; Xbox One; April 15, 2020
- Genre: Visual novel
- Mode: Single-player

Vampire: The Masquerade – Coteries of New York is a visual novel developed and published by Draw Distance. It is based on the tabletop role-playing game Vampire: The Masquerade, and part of the larger World of Darkness series. It was released in 2019 for Windows, and in 2020 for Linux, macOS, Nintendo Switch, PlayStation 4, and Xbox One. The stand-alone expansion Shadows of New York followed in 2020.

The player takes the role of one of three fledgling vampires of different vampire clans with different vampiric abilities, and interacts with the members of their coteries. The story depicts the struggle between two vampiric factions, and diverges based on player choices.

The game was designed by Krzysztof Zięba, who also was one of the writers, and used the tabletop game's sourcebook New York by Night as its main inspiration and reference for the characters and setting, while also taking influence from the use of moral dilemmas in the video games developed by Telltale Games. In adapting the tabletop game, the developers chose not to incorporate many of its game mechanics, and focused on what they considered essential for storytelling.

== Gameplay ==
The player interacts with characters and makes dialogue choices through text-based gameplay, causing the story to branch.

Vampire: The Masquerade – Coteries of New York is a single-player visual novel with mainly text-based gameplay, and involves the player making dialogue and story choices. As a vampire, the player character needs to balance their blood thirst with their humanity, while also ensuring that they do not reveal themselves as vampiric, breaking the Masquerade. Based on the choices the player makes, the narrative branches. In addition to the game's main quest, the player has access to side quests and loyalty quests; the latter involves creating bonds to the characters in their party ("coterie").

The player character can belong to one of three vampire clans, which affects their character's ethics and dialogue, and how the members of the player's coterie react to them. The choice of clan also determines what vampiric abilities ("disciplines") the player can use: a Brujah character can use Celerity (increased speed) and Potence (increased strength); a Toreador can also use Celerity, and Auspex (supernatural senses); and a Ventrue can use Fortitude (increased resilience) and Dominate (mind control); and all three can use Presence (attracting or scaring humans). These abilities can be used for problem solving, as well as in combat situations and when interacting with characters.

== Synopsis ==
=== Setting ===
Coteries of New York is set in New York City, in the World of Darkness. The story focuses on the struggles between two vampire factions – the traditionalist Camarilla and the rebellious Anarchs – and lets the player take the role of one of three fledgling vampires belonging to Camarilla clans: a passionate man of clan Brujah, an artistic man of clan Toreador, and a controlling businesswoman of clan Ventrue.

=== Plot ===
The unsuspecting player character is Embraced and transformed into a fledgling vampire by a mysterious stranger. They are picked up by Sheriff Qadir al-Asmai and taken before the court of Prince Hellene Panhard. Panhard sentences the fledgling to death in accordance with the vampire Traditions, but Sophie Langley, a patron at the court, intervenes and offers to take them under her protection. Langley provides lodging for the fledgling, teaches them how to hunt as well as other vampire-related knowledge, and introduces them to prominent members of the court, including Thomas Arturo and Robert Larson.

On Langley's advice, the fledgling begins to build their own coterie, reaching out to four recommended candidates: Agathon, D'Angelo, Hope and Tamika. The fledgling is also frequently sent to do Langley's biddings, which include obtaining information from the powerful broker Kaiser and setting up a secret meeting with Torque, an influential Anarch Baron. Langley reveals that the Anarch leader Boss Callihan is in fact the lover of Prince Panhard and blood bound to her, and the two are allied to maintain the status quo for their personal gain. She proposes that they head to Ellis Island to catch Panhard and Callihan in the act, using the knowledge to overthrow them, with Langley and Torque taking their places as leaders of the Camarilla and the Anarchs.

The fledgling, Langley and Torque confront Panhard and Callihan on Ellis Island. Torque is forced to escape during the ensuing brawl, which is then interrupted by the arrival of Arturo. Arturo reveals that he orchestrated all the events up to this point, including the fledgling's Embrace, and used them as a pawn to manipulate Langley into making a power play. He explains that he intended to destabilize the city, before returning it to a stable status quo, simply for his amusement. Arturo then has Langley executed and, declaring himself impressed with the fledgling's resourcefulness, offers to bind them to his blood and by extension his will.

== Development ==
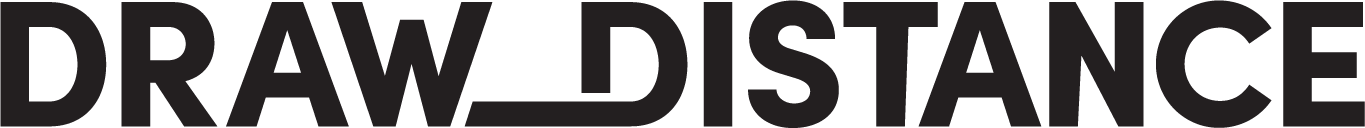
The game was developed and published by Draw Distance.

Coteries of New York was developed and published by the Polish studio Draw Distance, and was designed by Krzysztof Zięba, who also was one of the game's writers. The game was based on the fifth edition of the tabletop role-playing game Vampire: The Masquerade, and was produced in cooperation with Modiphius Entertainment, the developer at the time of the tabletop game, to ensure that it adhered to the Vampire: The Masquerade canon and lore; the story from Coteries of New York was in turn incorporated into the series' lore. It was however also designed with players who are new to the series in mind, and was written to work as an introduction to the series and setting, with a focus on introducing basic concepts and different vampire clans. Negotiating the licensing agreement for Vampire: The Masquerade, and the structure and content of the game, was a long process, starting at the Nordic Game conference in 2018.

The developers used the sourcebook New York by Night as their main source of inspiration and reference for the cast and setting. As New York by Night was published in 2001 for the tabletop game's Revised Edition, it was considered a jump-off point, with characters originating from it being developed to account for the passage of time in the setting since the book's publication, certain conflicts and events being resolved or progressing, and new characters being added. In rare cases where the sourcebook indicates how a certain character speaks, this was taken into consideration in the scriptwriting. In addition to New York by Night, the developers made use of information from Camarilla and Anarch, the sourcebooks that were available for the fifth edition of the tabletop game at the time. Another big influence on the game was the works of the game studio Telltale Games, and their use of moral dilemmas. Early on in the development, Choose Your Own Adventure gamebooks were also an influence.

In adapting the tabletop game to a narrative-driven video game format, the developers focused on what they considered what the tabletop game values – personal stories, and characters and their conflicting motivations – rather than gameplay mechanics. In doing so, they removed tabletop game mechanics such as leveling up and weapon stats, that were not crucial to telling the story, resulting in what they described as essentially a role-playing game without the things commonly associated with role-playing in video games. Although Coteries of New York was not initially designed as a visual novel-like game, it ended up moving towards that as the best format for a dialogue-driven game given the available development time.

== Release ==
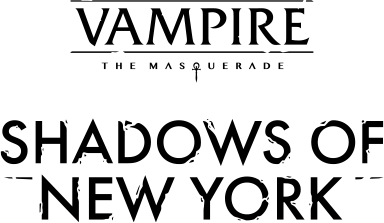
The stand-alone expansion Shadows of New York was released in 2020.

The game was announced in June 2019 with a teaser trailer, and was released on December 11, 2019 for Windows, following a one-week delay to allow for bug-fixing. Ports followed for Linux and macOS on January 23, 2020, Nintendo Switch on March 24, 2020, PlayStation 4 on March 25, and Xbox One on April 15, 2020. The console versions launched with additional character and environment art and improved audio design, which was added to the Windows version through an update. An artbook and a soundtrack album were released digitally on March 24, 2020. A Japanese localization of the game was released on November 12, 2020 for Nintendo Switch, PlayStation 4, and Windows by DMM Games.

A stand-alone expansion with an independent story, Vampire: The Masquerade – Shadows of New York, was released on September 10, 2020, and has the player take the role of a vampire from clan Lasombra while investigating the death of the local Anarch Movement leader. A physical "collector's edition" that includes Coteries of New York, Shadows of New York, an artbook, and a vinyl soundtrack, is planned for release in Q1/Q2 2021 for Nintendo Switch, PC, and PlayStation 4. It has not been released as of May 2023.

== Reception ==
Reception

Aggregate score
Aggregator	Score
Metacritic	70/100 (PC)

Review scores
Publication	Score
Eurogamer	7/10
IGN	6.9/10
PC Gamer (US)	77/100
Shacknews	5/10
Gamereactor	7/10
Multiplayer.it	6.3/10
RPGFan	63%

The game saw a "mixed or average" critical response according to the review aggregator Metacritic, but won the 2020 Central & Eastern European Game Awards for best narrative and was featured by Dengeki Online in their serial about recommended downloadable games.

The PC version was among the best-selling new releases of the month on Steam, (Note: Based on total revenue for the first two weeks on sale.) and recouped development and marketing costs within a week; on the other hand, the Japanese PlayStation 4 release did not appear on Famitsu's weekly top 30 chart of physical video game sales during its debut week, indicating that it sold less than 2,900 retail copies during the period.
