= Project Warlock =

2018 video game

- Developer: Buckshot Software
- Publishers: Gaming Company, Crunching Koalas
- Designers: Dawid Konrad Korzekwa; Iain Lockhart
- Programmer: Jakub Cislo
- Artist: Damian Bajowski
- Composers: Jerry Lehr; Luke Wilson
- Engine: Unity
- Platforms: Microsoft Windows; PlayStation 4 Nintendo Switch; Xbox One
- Release: Microsoft Windows; October 18, 2018; PlayStation 4 June 9, 2020; Nintendo Switch; June 11, 2020; Xbox One; June 12, 2020
- Genre: First-person shooter
- Mode: Single-player

Project Warlock is a 2018 first-person shooter video game developed by Polish studio Buckshot Software and published by Gaming Company. Project Warlock is notable for being created by 18-year-old Jakub Cislo, who developed the game while still attending high school. A sequel, titled Project Warlock II, was released into early access on June 10, 2022, and fully released on May 28, 2025.

== Gameplay ==
Project Warlock takes inspiration from classic 1990s shooters such as Blood, Doom and Heretic. The player explores a progression of non-linear levels while battling varied enemies and bosses. In order to survive to the exit, the player must seek out keys, power-ups, loot, weapons, and ammo; some of which are hidden in secret areas. Each level consists of one to four short stages. Levels are grouped into episodes, with the levels in each episode sharing a common theme.

Project Warlock adds light role-playing elements to the classic first-person shooter formula. The protagonist, an unnamed warlock, can wield both conventional weapons and magical spells. After completing each level, the player returns to the warlock's workshop where upgrade points and experience points collected in each level may be used to purchase new spells, weapon upgrades, and player perks such as increased health points.

The workshop is also used to save the player's progress between sessions. The game does not allow quick saves. Each level must be completed in its entirety for progress to be saved upon return to the workshop. Project Warlock also features an arcade-style lives system. The player has a limited number of lives, and running out will send the player back to the beginning of the current episode or, on the hardest difficulty, back to the beginning of the game.

== Development ==
Though he was born after they came out, Project Warlock developer Jakub Cislo was introduced to classic first-person shooter games like Blood, Heretic and Doom by his father. He enjoyed aspects of the older games compared to the more modern games of his time, and eventually decided to try and replicate the fast-paced action and complex levels in a new game of his own. The new game would be a rogue-like 2.5D shooter with items and enemies rendered as billboarding sprites.

Cislo's first iteration debuted with a small round of crowdfunding on Kickstarter under the name Exitium 3D. The campaign was successful but also earned Cislo a lot of negative feedback. He persisted, improving the game and changing the name to Cataclysm 3D. In April 2017, the game was approved on Steam Greenlight, however the Greenlight service was discontinued shortly afterward.

The modest success allowed Cislo to put together a small team including an artist, level designer, and sound designer. The team further developed the game, now called Project Warlock, eventually attracting the attention of a publisher, Gaming Company. A version for Linux and MacOS has been stated as "planned" as of October 2018, only requiring "additional testing". A sequel published by Retrovibe, Project Warlock II, was made available in early access via Steam on June 10, 2022.

== Reception ==
Reception

Aggregate score
Aggregator	Score
Metacritic	78/100

Review scores
Publication	Score
Destructoid	8/10
GameRevolution	8/10

Project Warlock was released on GOG.com as a timed exclusive on October 18, 2018, followed by a wider release on December 6, 2018.

The game received "generally favorable" reviews from critics, according to review aggregator Metacritic. YouTube reviewer Gggmanlives (now GmanLives) called Project Warlock "a damn good game" and praised the pixel art visuals, sound design, and fast-paced gun play; while criticizing the unbalanced spells and overly dark atmosphere. Destructoid also praised the sprite work while calling the soundtrack "superb". Dark Side of Gaming took a more critical view, describing the boss fights as "poorly constructed".
