= Pascal's Wager (video game) =

- Developer: TipsWorks
- Publishers: Giant Network; Yooreka Studio
- Engine: Unity
- Platforms: iOS; Android; Windows; Nintendo Switch
- Release: iOS; WW: January 16, 2020; Android; WW: June 25, 2020; Windows; WW: March 12, 2021; Switch; WW: July 14, 2022
- Genre: Action role-playing
- Mode: Single-player

Pascal's Wager is a Soulslike action role-playing video game developed by TipsWorks and published by Giant Network and Yooreka Studio.

== Gameplay ==
Players control Terrence, a courier who is searching for his wife in a land overcome with darkness. Pascal's Wager is a Soulslike, a subgenre of action role-playing games that focus on difficult boss battles and precise timing during combat. Several other characters join Terrence during his quest, and players can use them to fight battles. During battles, players must manage their sanity. Each hit they make causes them to lose some sanity, and becoming insane grants enemies additional powerful attacks. Another meter that is filled after making attacks allows players to make their own special attacks. Upon death, players lose some of their currency, which are used for upgrades, and they return to a checkpoint.

== Development ==
Pascal's Wager was developed in China. TipsWorks was founded in 2016 by developers who had previously worked on console games. Disliking the free-to-play model common in mobile games, they decided to produce a large, console-style game for mobile devices. Their primary influence were From Software's Souls games, but they also cited God of War, For Honor and Horizon: Zero Dawn. Pascal's Wager was initially planned to be a multiplayer game, but player feedback convinced them to take a more story-based approach.

Giant Network published Pascal's Wager for iOS on January 16, 2020; for Android on June 25, 2020; and for Windows on March 12, 2021. Yooreka Studio published it for Switch on July 14, 2022. The Tides of Oblivion DLC, which adds a new land to explore, was released in August 2020, and Dance of the Throne, which adds a new playable character, was first released in August 2022.

== Reception ==
On Metacritic, Pascal's Wager received positive reviews for iOS and mixed reviews for Windows. Digital Trends said it has "horrendous writing and voice acting" but felt the gameplay is impressive for a mobile game. Polygon called it a shameless clone of Dark Souls with a terrible plot, but they recommended it to players who want to play a Soulslike game on mobile devices. Both sites said playing with a controller on mobile devices was mandatory due to poor touch-based controls. Although not impressed with the graphics or voice acting, TouchArcade said it "feels great to play despite its quirks". Reviewing Pascal's Wager on Switch, Digitally Downloaded said it is "brutally clunky", lacking creativity, and a poor mobile port.
