= Cinders (video game) =

2012 video game

- Developer: MoaCube
- Publisher: MoaCube (Note: Console ports developed and published by Crunching Koalas)
- Designer: Tom Grochowiak
- Artist: Gracjana Zielinska
- Writers: Agnieszka Mulak; Hubert Sobecki; Ayu Sakata
- Composer: Rob Westwood
- Engine: Game Maker
- Platforms: Windows, Mac OS X, Nintendo Switch, PlayStation 4, Xbox One
- Release: Windows, Mac OS X; June 20, 2012; Nintendo Switch; February 14, 2019; PlayStation 4; August 25, 2020; Xbox One; August 26, 2020
- Genre: Visual novel
- Mode: Single-player

Cinders is a visual novel video game based on the Cinderella story that was developed and published by Polish indie studio MoaCube for Windows and Mac OS X in 2012, Nintendo Switch in 2019, and PlayStation 4 and Xbox One in 2020. The game was developed and published by MoaCube.

== Gameplay ==
As it is a visual novel, the player reads through the story and makes choices at crucial points to change the outcome, leading to one of four different endings. The player has the ability to watch the endings including the variations again. There are eight trophies the player can collect during the game.

== Characters ==
- Cinders: The protagonist of the story, called so fondly by her late father because of her red hair. Based on the player's choices her personality differs from kind and compliant or even passive, to bright, strong-willed and resourceful, to outright manipulative, selfish and evil or a combination of these traits.
- Sophia: Cinders' younger stepsister. She is smart but very cynical and bitter and years of degradation by her sister and mother have led to her tendency to push everyone away. She and Gloria clash frequently, but, unlike Gloria, she is often at odds with her mother as well. Whether Cinders tries to befriend and/or reconcile her with her sister or their relationship changes for the worse is up to the player.
- Gloria: Cinders' older stepsister. She is stubborn, and desperately tries to imitate and please Carmosa to the extent of losing herself in the process. She has a tense relationship with Sophia due to the latter's apathy, sharp tongue, and general attitude, but in her own way is as much a slave to Carmosa's will and temper as her sister and Cinders, despite being the favoured daughter. She is more reasonable and fair than her mother if given a chance to show her true colors though. As with Sophia, whether or not she can be befriended, and/or reconciled with her sister depends on the player's actions.
- Lady Carmosa: Cinders' stepmother. Lady Carmosa is very capable, clever, resourceful, and utterly ruthless. Ruling over her household and family with an iron fist, not even her own daughters are spared her harsh and often cruel judgements and words. She is not completely evil, however, and it is revealed that beneath her domineering and cold demeanor she struggles hard to keep the house in its splendor and her family under control. Depending on the player's choices, Cinders can sympathize with her and even earn her respect and support and get a stuttering apology. However, Cinders can also choose to undermine Carmosa's plans and efforts, have her imprisoned or humiliated (if she finds out Carmosa forged their invitations to the royal ball), and even attempt to poison her in order to remove her from power.
- Madame Ghede: The local medicine woman and a friend of Cinders' late mother. The townsfolk think of her as a witch and generally mistrust her, but are all too willing to run to her when they need help, a fact she resents greatly and which hurts her more than she cares to let on. She offers to help Cinders in honour of a promise she made to Cinders mother, but whether or not she does is up to the player. Also depending on Cinders' decisions and relationship with her, Ghede can become her royal advisor, mentor and travelling companion - or her mourner if Cinders dies.
- The Fairy: An ethereal being of questionable motives who inhabits the Lake, she also has a history with Cinders' mother and offers to help Cinders for a price, but as with Madame Ghede, it's up to the player whether or not to accept her help...
- Prince Basile: The prince and future king of the country, he throws a masquerade ball to honor his late father's wish to marry before his coronation. He wants to find an intelligent and strong woman capable of ruling as Queen and helping him realize his reforms. Basile may be Cinders' potential love interest and/or husband depending on the player's choices.
- Tobias: A childhood friend of Cinders' and a successful merchant. Depending on your choices he is also a potential love interest for Cinders.
- Perrault: The captain of the royal guard and defender of the village known for his profound loyalty and sense of duty, Perrault can become Cinders' friend or love interest depending on her choices and actions. If Cinders tries and fails to poison her stepmother and is romantically involved with Perrault, he will forfeit duty and honor to run away with and become a fugitive alongside her.
- Shady Character: A local shifty-looking lowlife with a loose lip and a penchant for drinking. Should Cinders plot to kill Lady Carmosa, Shady will supply her with poison.

== Development and release ==
The game was created with the GameMaker engine. The development time took about one year. Cinders was originally released on June 20, 2012 for Windows and Mac OS X. On May 1, 2014, the game was released on Steam. Developed and published by Crunching Koalas, ports for Nintendo Switch, PlayStation 4, and Xbox One were released on February 14, 2019, August 25, 2020, and August 26, 2020, respectively.

=== Soundtrack ===
The official soundtrack by Rob Westwood was released on December 24, 2012. It includes 18 tracks at a total length of 59:17. Cinders OST includes extended versions of all the game's tracks. It won the yearly award for the "Best Original Score" in 2012 by VNs Now!

1. Fairy Tales [02:15]
2. The Curious One (Theme of Cinders) [03:02]
3. What Lies Behind the Page [02:20]
4. Buttered Water [03:04]
5. Born from Decision [04:47]
6. Pompous Wisdom [03:38]
7. Living Upward [02:18]
8. Tragic Double Standards [02:31]
9. Swept Away [02:24]
10. Voodoo Matriarch [02:34]
11. A Friendly Face [04:08]
12. Seedy, Greedy and Downright Sleazy [04:02]
13. Weary of War [03:00]
14. Certainly No Knight [04:11]
15. A Fork in the Road [01:09]
16. Dance With Me Noble Stranger [04:42]
17. Romantic Interlude (Unused Title Theme) [02:12]
18. Melodies and Blurbs (Medley of Themes) [06:51]

== Reception ==
Reception

Aggregate score
Aggregator	Score
Metacritic	NS: 73/100; XONE: 69/100

Review score
Publication	Score
Pocket Gamer	4/5

Cinders received 5/5 stars on GameZebo with reviewer Neilie Johnson writing: "If you've never experienced an interactive novel, Cinders is an exceptional example of the genre, and the perfect title with which to start." IndieGame" wrote about the game: "Asides from being delightfully well-written, highly replayable and filled with complex, convoluted characters, Cinders is also beautiful."

The game was also featured on Rock, Paper, Shotgun and Kotaku. Cinders won the 2012 VNs Now! award for the Best Artist (Gracjana Zielinska).
