= Family (video game) =

- itch.io header art
- Developer: Sheinman Games
- Platform: Windows
- Release: 11 July 2020
- Genre: Puzzle
- Mode: Single-player

Family is a 2020 puzzle video game by Sheinman Games, the studio of independent British developer Tim Sheinman. Described by the creator as a "unique detective game of musical genealogy", players piece together information from radio interviews, music and written notes to identify a series of band members in a fictitious music scene, the 'London Pop Scene', displayed on an incomplete family tree from 1985 to 1995. The game contains short recordings from each fictional artist evocative of real-world counterparts in 80s and 90s indie and alternative music. Following release, Family received positive reviews from critics, with praise directed towards the quality and verisimilitude of the game's music and the construction of its narrative through its puzzle gameplay mechanics. Sheinman published a follow-up title with a similar premise, Rivals, in late 2020.

== Gameplay ==
Players listen to radio interviews and read information to connect the names of band members to a family tree of recording artists.

Family is a puzzle video game in which players are tasked to correctly identify a series of 30 members of fictitious musical acts and their roles in the 'London Pop Scene', active from 1985 to 1995. Players are provided writings, music recordings and radio tracks to fill in a family tree, using the information and logic to correctly connect a list of names to roles in various bands. Certain members may appear multiple times or change their role across bands, requiring players to deduce the changes from the evidence provided. Sussex FM, a fictitious radio station, plays the songs from each band with interviews of guest Ella Neil in between, providing further clues on the membership. Players can alternate between playing nine individual tracks on demand or listening to the radio station in the background. Once players have guessed five names correctly, these names will be confirmed as correct and additional written clues will be provided.

== Development ==
Sheinman developed Family between June and July 2020 as a "taxonomic detective game", based on Rock Family Trees, a series of books and television show depicting the connections between popular music artists in family trees and the games of independent developer Lucas Pope. The fictional bands and music in the game were based on several real-world artists from the game's reference period, including The Jesus and Mary Chain, The Smiths, Soft Cell, Kate Bush, Elvis Costello, Mock Turtles, The Stone Roses, Talk Talk, Tears for Fears, Slowdive and Cocteau Twins. Sheinman revisited and refined the music-based concept and puzzle game mechanics of Family in several later titles, including the 2020 game Rivals and the 2022 game Riley and Rochelle.

== Reception ==
Tom Sykes of PC Gamer praised the game as a "great" title, commending the game's tracks as "cracking tunes" that were "well-produced" and "convincing", and assessing the game's theme to be "clearly borne from a love and deep understanding of indie music and of a bygone age of music journalism". Robert Purchese of Eurogamer described the game's "impressive" original music as the "real star", considering it to be "recorded to such a high quality it could be the real thing" and contributed to building a "picture of an unmistakable time and place". Alice Bell of Describing Family as a "piece of detective micro-fiction" Rock Paper Shotgun considered the narrative to do a "great job of replicating insular music scenes" and their interpersonal dynamics, and containing a "personal touch" and "heart" that motivated her to engage with the gameplay. At first considering the game's mechanics to be "awkward" and a "clash of story and action", Declan Taggart of Unwinnable Monthly expressed admiration for the game's depiction of a specific and nostalgic era through its narrative fragments. Taggart considered the game succeeded in "creating an authentic-feeling past where other games with similar aims might not", citing the narrative's "bittersweet quality", avoidance of sentimentality by depicting "addiction, personal and interpersonal chaos", and leaving open loose ends of the narrative. Gaming journalist John Walker considered the game to be a "satisfying" and "clever" title, highlighting the extraordinary aspect of the "entirely imagined" concept, music, radio interviews being co-ordinated by a one-man development team. Several critics compared the game's concept to the 2018 title Return of the Obra Dinn, an investigative puzzle game with similar game mechanics.
