= Don't Scream =

2024 survival horror game

- Designer: Joe Henson
- Engine: Unreal Engine 5
- Platform: Microsoft Windows
- Genre: Survival horror
- Mode: Single-player

Don't Scream is an indie survival horror game, designed by Joe Henson. The game became popular when it released for early access on 27 October 2023. Version 1.0 was released on 28 October 2024.

A sequel, titled Don't Scream Together, was released on 3 December 2025.

== Gameplay ==
Don't Scream is 18 minutes long; time only moves in the game when the player moves. The game is set in a forest in 1993, near the site of what appears to be a plane crash. The game is played from the perspective of a camcorder, which the protagonist is assumed to be carrying. The player can choose different paths which will lead to either a homestead, a farm, a mini-mart, or a cemetery. There are random encounters of ghostly spirits that haunt the forest who will attempt to scare the player. The player character dies if they scream or make a loud noise; the game allows this mechanic to function by accessing players' microphones, with their consent. Players can restart when they die.

== Development ==
Joe Henson, who designed and developed the game, said that "The rise of PlayStation-esque visuals in a lot of indie horror titles is a testament to how undefined visuals can increase the fear factor." Henson added that the "loss of details plays into our imagination".
