= DreadOut =

2014 video game

- Developer: Digital Happiness
- Publisher: Digital Happiness
- Director: Vadi Vanadi
- Producers: Rachmad Imron; Sukmadi Rafiuddin; Dai Daks
- Designer: Rendy Basuki
- Composers: Adhit Android; KOIL
- Engine: Unity
- Platforms: Windows, Linux, OS X
- Release: Windows; 15 May 2014; Linux, OS X 20 August 2014
- Genre: Survival horror
- Mode: Single-player

DreadOut is a 2014 survival horror video game from independent developer Digital Happiness for Microsoft Windows, Linux, and OS X. A port for PlayStation 4 was announced but never released. The story is about a group of high school students in Indonesia who come across an old abandoned town. There they are confronted with ghosts and paranormal activities, and one of the students, the protagonist Linda, begins to uncover the secrets of the town and its surrounding area. A sequel, titled DreadOut 2, released for Microsoft Windows in February 2020, was subsequently ported to PlayStation 4, PlayStation 5, Xbox One, and Xbox Series X/S in July 2022. A Nintendo Switch port of the sequel was released in January 2024.

== Gameplay ==
DreadOut is a third-person horror game that uses mechanics similar to those found in the Fatal Frame series. The player uses modern gadgets, such as her smartphone and a digital camera, to interact with (or fend off) various kinds of Indonesian mythical ghosts and to help her solve various puzzles. When Linda dies in the game, she awakens in Limbo, depicted as darkness surrounded by candles with a bright light in the distance. By running towards the light, Linda will come back to life. However, subsequent deaths will push the light further and further away from Linda, unless she manages to find three mystical items to keep the light closer to her.

The game features both third and first-person control schemes, with the player navigating environments with a standard over-the-shoulder perspective. If the player decides to use their digital camera to photograph something, they enter a first-person perspective to see through Linda's equipped camera. Any ghosts that are photographed or interacted with in any way will be recorded in a "Ghostpedia" in Linda's notebook. Linda can also find articles and journal entries that describe much of the game's backstory. A preview video showed a tablet version of the game, where the player controls Linda via the touch screen.

== Plot ==
Linda Meilinda, her senior high school friends Shakira "Ira" Irawati, Doni Maulana, Shelly Angelia, Yayan and their teacher Ms. Siska go astray during a vacation trip in Indonesia. They discover an abandoned town, entering an old school. Linda and her classmates are trapped inside with ghosts. They kill Doni and possess Ira, Shelly commits suicide, Yayan disappears and Siska is missing. Linda is relentlessly being pursued by the ghosts, including a woman dressed in red.

The player can choose whether to defeat the woman or leave the school. If the player defeats her, the woman reveals to Linda that she is the guardian of the spirit realm, giving Linda her newfound power and title as the keeper of darkness. Linda sees Siska leaving the school with a baby serpent in her arms. If the player leaves the school, Linda is rescued by the police and escorted to their car, until the woman appears, causing them to crash.

== Development ==
Indonesian developer Digital Happiness worked on the game using a team of around 20 people. After releasing a demo, they sought a crowd sourcing campaign via Indiegogo. The campaign asked for US$25,000 and ended with US$29,067. They needed crowd sourcing since the game industry in Indonesia is small and focuses mostly on social or mobile games and were unable to find funding. Digital Happiness founder Rachmad Imron stated: "We have a lot of good human resources but most of them went abroad because there's no game industry in Indonesia, but we hope this will change soon."

== Reception ==
Reception

Aggregate score
Aggregator	Score
Metacritic	55/100

Review scores
Publication	Score
Hardcore Gamer	2/5
Polygon	5/10

DreadOut received "mixed or average" reviews, according to review aggregator website Metacritic.

== Film adaptation ==
In 2018, Indonesian production company GoodHouse announced a film adaption of Dreadout. The film was released in Indonesia on 3 January 2019. The film was directed by Kimo Stamboel. The film cast included Caitlin Halderman, Jefri Nichol, Marsha Aruan, Ciccio Manassero, Susan Sameh, and Irsyadillah.
