= Overcrowd: A Commute 'Em Up =

2020 video game

- Developer(s): SquarePlay Games
- Publisher(s): SquarePlay Games
- Designer(s): Alastair McQueen
- Programmer(s): Alastair McQueen
- Artist(s): Sarah Testori
- Engine: GameMaker
- Platform(s): Windows
- Release: October 6, 2020
- Genre(s): Construction and management simulation
- Mode(s): Single-player

Overcrowd: A Commute 'Em Up is a 2020 construction and management simulation game developed and published by SquarePlay Games. The player manages a metro station, including through construction, hiring, and scheduling. Commuters need to be kept satisfied. SquarePlay Games, a two-person indie studio, found its inspiration in the London Underground. After five years of development and an early access period from June 2019, the game was released in October 2020 to a positive reception.

== Gameplay ==
A small station with three trains and several commuters

Overcrowd is a construction and management simulation game. The objective of the game is to design and manage a 1990s metro station in the fictional Lubdon Town, styled like the London Underground, with maximum efficiency. There are three game modes: The sandbox is a free-play station with no limits, "commute of the day" is a scenario mode that rotates daily, and the campaign is a network of procedurally generated stations with increasing difficulty, similar to Two Point Hospital.

The three modes share their core gameplay. At the beginning of each station, the player is given an empty map, in which they must excavate and construct the station's foundations. Up to four layers, connected by stairs and escalators, can be dug, and buildings cannot overlap. The station is divided into a grid where each item takes up one space. The player then needs to place and arrange required facilities, such as train platforms, turnstiles, generator and janitor rooms, and lighting.

Each commuter has needs, including happiness, thirst, hunger, cleanliness, and patience. Needs can be fulfilled by building relevant amenities. To maintain high commuter satisfaction, the station layout needs to be efficient, while amenities need to be in good condition and operational. For instance, the heat generated by trains and machines can be countered with air conditioning and fans to avoid the station losing in reputation. When near too much litter, commuters may experience diarrhoea or vomit. Commuters may be affected by random events, such as the flu, heat strokes, and rat infestations. A decrease in the overall satisfaction results in the station losing reputation; in the campaign mode, the player loses when the reputation is depleted.

Staff are needed to operate the facilities, for which the player creates schedules and assigns priorities. The staff operate machines, clean the station, and assist commuters, among other tasks. To work, staff need break rooms, adequate pay, and tools for each task. They need to be manually placed in different parts of the station to maximise efficiency. Properties such as litter collection, shop prices, and power consumption can be micromanaged. The player also needs to manually empty trash cans and install light bulbs. Shops and ticket machines generate cash, which the player can spend on construction and other maintenance fees. As the game progresses, the player unlocks permanent technology upgrades, which, unlike money and reputation, do not reset when starting a new station.

== Development and release ==
Overcrowd was developed using GameMaker by SquarePlay Games, an indie developer based in London. The studio consists of two people: the designer and programmer Alastair "Al" McQueen and the artist Sarah Testori. McQueen was inspired by a ride on the Piccadilly Line of the London Underground and set out to create a "faithful reimagining" of public transit. The development lasted for five years. Overcrowd was released into Steam Early Access on June 8, 2019. After 15 months of development and several major updates, including the addition of heat maps, staff uniforms, and further types of commuters and trains, the full game was released on October 6, 2020.

== Reception ==
Eurogamer's Matt Wales said that Overcrowd was "delivered with a wonderful degree of polish", and Steve Hogarty from Rock Paper Shotgun described the early access version as a "wonderful mix of strategy and puzzling" while the campaign was "unreasonably challenging" because "passenger grievances seem to mount faster than they can be addressed". Hogarty criticised the user interface, which has small fonts and menus with many nested layers, as unintuitive and difficult to use. The London Transport Museum preserved Overcrowd "in perpetuity" for being "a charming creative interpretation of London's public transport network".
