= New Retro Arcade: Neon =

2016 video game

- Developer(s): Digital Cybercherries
- Publisher(s): Digital Cybercherries
- Designer(s): Dec Doyle; Ulrich Gollick; Josh Lennen; Andrew Hielscher; Joe Henson
- Engine: Unreal Engine 4
- Platform(s): HTC Vive, Oculus Rift
- Release: August 1, 2016
- Genre(s): Simulation
- Mode(s): Multiplayer

New Retro Arcade: Neon is a virtual reality first-person video game developed and published for the PC by independent developer Digital Cybercherries. It was released on Steam on August 1, 2016. The game is compatible with the HTC Vive and Oculus Rift.

== Gameplay ==
Players are taken back to the '80s/early '90s and are put inside a retro arcade room. In the game, players are able to interact with mini-games including Bowling, Air Hockey Skeeball, and more. Inside the room itself are usable objects such as Guitars, Drum Machines and Light Guns. The main feature of the game focuses on customisation and being able to emulate your favourite arcade games, by using any of the 30 arcade cabinets. The game also supports Non-VR.

== Reception ==
UploadVR favoured the game for its authenticity and how Digital Cybercherries do an excellent job of capturing the vibe and atmosphere.
