= Digital Cybercherries =

British video game developer

Digital Cybercherries Limited
- Industry: Video games
- Founded: 29 October 2015; 10 years ago
- Headquarters: United Kingdom
- Products: New Retro Arcade: Neon; Hypercharge: Unboxed
- Website: digitalcybercherries.com

Digital Cybercherries Limited is a video game developer based in the United Kingdom. The studio was founded in 2015 by a group of close friends who shared the belief that the players are integral to the creation of their games. They have developed and released two video games: New Retro Arcade: Neon and Hypercharge: Unboxed.

The studio's first game, New Retro Arcade: Neon, was released independently on 1 August 2016. It was met with favourable reception and won VRDB's Players Choice VR of the Year 2016 award.

Their second game, Hypercharge: Unboxed, was released for Microsoft Windows via Steam Early Access on 22 June 2017. After being released on the Nintendo Switch in February 2020, it became available for Windows via Steam in June 2020.

On November 10, 2022, Digital Cybercherries expanded its portfolio by announcing a partnership with Joe Henson (video game designer), a British video game designer and marketing consultant, for the development and publishing of "Paranormal Tales."

The team includes Dec Doyle (Lead Programmer and Game Designer), Ulrich Gollick (Lead Audio Engineer and Game Designer), Joe Henson (video game designer) (Creative Gameplay Designer and Marketing Director), Nick Watkinson (Build Manager and Engine Programming), Josh Lennen (Art Director and Character Artist), Andrew Hielscher (Environment and Level Designer).

== Games developed ==
Year	Title	Platform(s)	Publisher(s)
2016	New Retro Arcade: Neon	Microsoft Windows	Digital Cybercherries
2020	Hypercharge: Unboxed	Microsoft Windows; Nintendo Switch	Digital Cybercherries
2024	Don't Scream	Microsoft Windows	Digital Cybercherries
TBA	Paranormal Tales	Microsoft Windows	Digital Cybercherries
