= Digital Happiness =

Indonesian video game developer

- Industry: Video games
- Founded: 2013; 13 years ago
- Founder: Rachman Imron
- Headquarters: Bandung, West Java, Indonesia
- Key people: Rachman Imron; Vadi Vanadi; Sukmadi; Dwi Arif Irawan
- Products: DreadOut
- Parent: PT Digital Semantika Indonesia
- Website: www.digitalhappiness.net

Digital Happiness is an Indonesian software design company and video game developer under PT Digital Semantika Indonesia. It is mostly known as the developer and producer of popular survival horror game, DreadOut. It is founded by Rachmad Imron in 2013.

== Games ==
- The Hallway Raid (2012)
- DreadOut (2014)
- DreadOut: Keepers of the Dark (2016)
- DreadEye (2017)
- DreadOut 2 (2020)
- DreadHaunt (2024)
- DreadOut 3 (2026)
