= Cannibal Cuisine =

2020 video game

- Developer: Rocket Vulture
- Publisher: Rocket Vulture
- Engine: Unity
- Platforms: Windows, Nintendo Switch, PlayStation 4, PlayStation 5, Xbox One, Xbox Series X/S
- Release: Windows, Switch; 20 May 2020; PS4, PS5, XBO, XSXS; 25 January 2022
- Genre: Simulation
- Modes: Single-player, multiplayer

Cannibal Cuisine is a cooking simulation game developed and published by Belgium studio Rocket Vulture. In a cooperative or competitive experience, players control a number of cannibals on a tropical island feeding tourists to their god "Hoochooboo". The game was released for Microsoft Windows and Nintendo Switch on 20 May 2020. It was ported to PlayStation 4, PlayStation 5, Xbox One, and Xbox Series X/S on 25 January 2022, alongside an expansion titled The Curse of the Scarab King.

== Gameplay ==
Players in Cannibal Cuisine each control one cannibal chef, and must collect vegetables, fruits and meat (from killing tourists) to combine into meals on cooking spits. There is one or more Hoochooboos in the level who will request different meals. Delivering correct meals score points for the players, while delivering the wrong meals will cause the Hoochooboo to throw fireballs at the players.

Cannibal Cuisine was designed primarily as a cooperative experience for up to four players, but it also has a competitive multiplayer mode. In competitive multiplayer, two teams compete to score the most points by feeding their Hoochooboo food. It is possible to fight the other team to disrupt their efforts, with ingredients and tourists to be found in a shared area which both teams can access. The game can be played in singleplayer, local multiplayer, online multiplayer, or combined local and online multiplayer (with multiple players on one computer or Switch connecting to other players online).

== Reception ==
Reception

Aggregate scores
Aggregator	Score
Metacritic	(NS) 60/100 (PC) 56/100 (PS5) 69/100 (XSXS) 69/100
OpenCritic	19% recommend

Review score
Publication	Score
Nintendo World Report	6/10

Cannibal Cuisine received "mixed or average" reviews, according to review aggregator Metacritic. Fellow review aggregator OpenCritic assessed that the game received fair approval, being recommended by 19% of critics.

Reviews generally considered the gameplay to be solid, but criticized the controls. Some reviewers found the cannibalism theme distasteful, with GameWatcher describing it as 'insensitive' and 'sensationalist'. In response to criticism of the controls, the developers released an update shortly after release on 24 May 2020.
