= Who's Your Daddy? (video game) =

2016 video game

- Developer: Evil Tortilla Games
- Publisher: Evil Tortilla Games
- Designer: Joe Williams
- Composer: Mathias Bjørnskov
- Engine: Unity
- Platforms: Windows; macOS; Linux; Xbox One; Xbox Series X/S; PlayStation 4; PlayStation 5; Android; iOS (TBA)
- Release: WW: December 23, 2015 (Early access); WW: May 13, 2016 (Full release); WW: December 23, 2020 (Remake)
- Genres: Simulation, parody
- Mode: Multiplayer

Who's Your Daddy? is an online multiplayer parody simulation video game created by Joseph Williams under the name Evil Tortilla Games. The game raised US$1,500 through the crowdfunding platform Kickstarter and was approved for release on Steam via Steam Greenlight. An early access version launched on December 23, 2015, followed by a full release on May 13, 2016.

== Gameplay ==
Who's Your Daddy? features a competitive multiplayer mode played either online or locally. One player controls the father, who must prevent household accidents, while the other controls the baby, who attempts to endanger itself in various ways. The father can secure cabinets, hide dangerous items, and block access to hazards, while the baby may ingest bleach, crawl into ovens, or insert objects into electrical outlets.

The original game is set in a two-story home with several common rooms. The remake introduced a remastered version of the house and added a new map, "The Baby Daddy Academy". Players typically swap roles between rounds.

== Release ==
Who's Your Daddy? raised US$1,500 through the crowdfunding platform Kickstarter and was approved for release on Steam via Steam Greenlight. An early access version launched on December 23, 2015, followed by a full release on May 13, 2016.

=== Remake ===
A full remake of the game, branded Who's Your Daddy?!, was announced on the game's Steam community page on October 16, 2018. The release was delayed several times before launching on December 23, 2020, exactly five years after the original early access release. The remake expanded to additional platforms, including Xbox One, Xbox Series X|S, PlayStation 4, PlayStation 5, and Android, with an iOS version planned.

Both the original and the remake remain accessible through Steam as separate launch options. The remake includes updated visuals, new mechanics, and expanded maps, while continuing to receive patches and content updates into the mid-2020s.

== Reception ==
Rock Paper Shotgun said "It's a simple idea which began as a gag, but it looks a bit of a lark."
