= Hypercharge: Unboxed =

2020 video game

- Developer: Digital Cybercherries
- Publisher: Digital Cybercherries
- Designers: Dec Doyle; Ulrich Gollick; Joe Henson; Josh Lennen; Nick Watkinson; Andrew Hielscher
- Engine: Unreal Engine 4
- Platforms: Nintendo Switch; PlayStation 4; PlayStation 5; Windows; Xbox One; Xbox Series X/S
- Release: Nintendo Switch; 31 January 2020; Windows; 27 April 2020; Xbox One, Xbox Series X/S; 31 May 2024; PS4, PS5; 30 May 2025
- Genres: First-person shooter; Third-person shooter
- Modes: Single-player, multiplayer

Hypercharge: Unboxed is a 2020 shooter game developed and published by Digital Cybercherries. The game is set in various domestic and retail environments, including bedrooms, garages, bathrooms, gardens, and toy stores, where players assume the role of an action figure.

The primary objective is to defend a central object, referred to as the Hypercore, from successive waves of hostile, animated toys. The main adversary in the game is a character named Major Evil, who leads the attacks against the Hypercore. The narrative suggests that failure to defend the Hypercore would result in humans forgetting about their childhood action figures. The game introduces a character, Sgt. Max Ammo, who plays a significant role in the storyline as the leader of the defense efforts.

Hypercharge: Unboxed was originally released for Windows on Steam Early Access in 2017, with a full release on Nintendo Switch in January 2020, Windows in April 2020, Xbox One and Xbox Series X/S in May 2024, and PlayStation 4 and PlayStation 5 in May 2025. The game has been met with generally favorable reviews.

== Gameplay ==
Hypercharge: Unboxed is designed to support cooperative gameplay, allowing for 1-4 players in online and local co-op modes, with difficulty scaling to accommodate the number of players. It also supports offline play with player bots, full split-screen for online/local co-op, and features both a wave-based shooter mode with a story campaign and classic player versus player modes accommodating up to eight players.

In Hypercharge: Unboxed, the primary objective is to complete a story-driven campaign, focusing on defending the Hypercore against successive enemy waves and accomplishing various tasks. Throughout the game, players engage in exploration to discover weapons, resources, and hidden items essential for surviving the attacks led by the antagonist, Major Evil. This gameplay combines strategic defense elements with exploration and resource management, encouraging players to strategically prepare for each challenge the game presents.

Distinctly, Hypercharge: Unboxed aims to provide a gaming experience that combines nostalgia with modern gameplay mechanics, explicitly avoiding pay-to-progress models. Instead, it focuses on player skill and teamwork. The game also features character customization, allowing players to unlock new action figures by achieving specific gameplay milestones, thereby promoting a philosophy against pay-to-win practices. philosophy.

== Development and release ==
Digital Cybercherries were awarded an Unreal Dev Grant which helped to further fund Hypercharge: Unboxed. It is built in the Unreal Engine 4.

The game was released on the Nintendo eShop on 31 January 2020 and on Steam on 27 April.

The development of Hypercharge: Unboxed for Xbox was officially announced on 16 July 2022, with the developers also confirming future support for PlayStation.

On 1 May 2024, Digital CyberCherries announced that Hypercharge: Unboxed will be released for Xbox One and Xbox Series S/X on 31 May.

== Reception ==
Reception

Aggregate scores
| Aggregator | Score |
|---|---|
| Metacritic | (XSX) 80/100 (PS5) 65/100 |
| OpenCritic | 73% recommend |

Review score
| Publication | Score |
|---|---|
| Nintendo Life | 7/10 |

Hypercharge: Unboxed received "generally favorable" reviews from critics for the Xbox Series X version, while the Nintendo Switch version received "mixed or average" reviews, according to review aggregator website Metacritic. Fellow review aggregator OpenCritic assessed that the game received fair approval, being recommended by 73% of critics.

Kotaku commended the game for its mechanics, noting, "what is here is solid. Guns feel good, enemies react when you shoot them, and movement is fast and snappy." Similarly, Nintendo Life highlighted its multiplayer appeal, stating, "Great fun if you can muster together enough friends."

It was awarded first place in IndieDB's Players Choice Indie of the Year 2020, and also received IndieDB's Editor's Choice Award. The game garnered further recognition by winning the Best Multiplayer award at both the Brazil's Independent Games Festival and the GWB Game Awards organized by Tencent. Additionally, Hypercharge: Unboxed was a finalist in the Best Casual Game category at the TIGA Games Industry Awards in 2022 and was highlighted by Steam in its "Best of 2020" under the Top New Releases of 2020.

Two years post-launch, in 2022, Hypercharge: Unboxed experienced a surge in popularity. The game received another surge in popularity in May 2025 when the developers responded to a player's complaint about its low online playerbase.
