= I am Setsuna =

2016 video game

- Developer: Tokyo RPG Factory
- Publisher: Square Enix
- Director: Atsushi Hashimoto
- Producer: Kengo Uchibori
- Artists: Toi8; Jun Suzuki
- Writers: Hirotaka Inaba; Makoto Goya
- Composer: Tomoki Miyoshi
- Engine: Unity
- Platforms: PlayStation 4; PlayStation Vita; Microsoft Windows; Nintendo Switch
- Release: Vita: JP: February 18, 2016; Windows, PS4: JP: February 18, 2016; WW: July 19, 2016; Nintendo Switch: WW: March 3, 2017
- Genre: Role-playing
- Mode: Single-player

I am Setsuna (Note: Known as Ikenie to Yuki no Setsuna (いけにえと雪のセツナ; lit. "Setsuna of Sacrifice and Snow") in Japan) is a 2016 role-playing video game developed by Tokyo RPG Factory and published by Square Enix for PlayStation 4, PlayStation Vita and Microsoft Windows. A version for the Nintendo Switch was released in 2017 as a console launch title. The storyline, set in a snow-bound world plagued by monsters, follows silent protagonist Endir as he becomes the guardian of Setsuna, a young woman destined to be a sacrifice for pacifying the world's monsters. The gameplay, designed to emulate titles from the genre's "golden age", uses an Active Time Battle system.

The debut project of Tokyo RPG Factory, I am Setsuna began development in 2014 with a short production schedule. In keeping with the studio's goal, the team took mechanical inspiration from Chrono Trigger (1995). Using the visual theme of snow, the narrative was written to explore the theme of sadness. The music, composed by Tomoki Miyoshi, was performed on piano by Randy Kerber. Due to its weak market presence, the Vita version was not localized. The game released to strong sales and was positively received by critics. Praise went to its atmosphere, soundtrack, and combat, though several faulted the lack of aesthetic variety and low difficulty. Tokyo RPG Factory went on to produce two more titles before closing in 2024: Lost Sphear (2017) and Oninaki (2019).

== Gameplay ==
A battle within I am Setsuna showing the player party, their individual displays, the command menu, and their opponent

I am Setsuna is a role-playing video game in which players take control of a party of characters, navigating environments from a fixed top-down perspective. Locations, such as towns and areas outdoors and in dungeons where enemy encounters take place, are reached by navigating the game's overworld. In towns, the party can talk with villagers to reveal plot elements. Items such as potions or stones used to escape battles are sold in shops in towns. There are a small number of side quests tied to each of the playable characters, unlocked when all characters are recruited and triggered by having that character in the current party.

Enemies are represented on the field by icons: contact with the icons initiates a battle. Battles take place in the environments where the enemy is encountered, rather than shifting to a specific battle arena. Characters' health and magic meter are respectively represented by HP and MP. Characters fight using a version of the turn based Active Time Battle (ATB) system: after each action is taken by a character in battle, an ATB gauge must fill again before another action is taken. Available actions include attacking with weapons; using special combat abilities or magic, which are lumped together as "Techs"; or using an item. If more than one character's ATB gauges are full, they will perform actions in the order in which instructions are issued to them.

Each character may equip talismans which house interchangeable Spritnite crystals, which unlock Techs. Some Techs can synergize together into a new ability. If one of these "Double Techs" is available, the "Techs" menu will change to "Combo". Each time an action is taken or a character's ATB gauge is allowed to remain full, a separate "Setsuna" gauge begins to fill. When full, it grants a "Momentum" charge which may be expended at the player's discretion to grant power boosts to the character's actions. These boosts can include dealing multiple versions of the attack, recovering health, or dealing critical damage to an enemy. After combat, defeated enemies grant experience points which raise a character's health and magic points, with other statistical elements only changing using weapons. They also drop items and materials, which are influenced by the way enemies are killed and can be sold for in-game currency.

== Synopsis ==
I am Setsuna is set in a snow-bound land regularly attacked by monsters. According to an ancient custom, a maiden is sacrificed in the distant Last Lands to appease monsters. The story begins with the mercenary Endir accepting a mission to assassinate Setsuna, the next chosen sacrifice. Upon arriving, Setsuna persuades him to accompany her as a guardian alongside her childhood friend Aeterna. On their journey, they meet and are joined by Nidr, the guard of the earlier sacrifice and Setsuna's illegitimate father; Kir, a member of a magically gifted tribe with truncated lifespans; and Julienne, a descendant of the ancient kingdom once occupying the Last Lands. They are attacked several times by a figure called the Reaper, who is driven by a power that seeks Setsuna's death; he is eventually killed when they arrive in the Last Lands. The growing party also comes across signs of the monsters' continued attacks, undermining the morale of surviving human settlements.

At the heart of the Last Lands, the group is met by a woman called the Time Judge, who reveals that the sacrifices are offered to sustain a barrier that imprisons the Dark Samsara, with Aeterna being a clone that can be active beyond the Last Lands. Once a magically-gifted boy a millennium before, the Dark Samsara was experimented on by Julienne's ancestors when magic started dying out, the aim being to create an eternal source of magic. The boy lost his consciousness and became a being driven by rage, destroying the kingdom that occupied the Last Lands and birthing the monsters. The previous sacrifice, Setsuna's mother, told the Time Judge of Setsuna's potential as one who might defeat the Dark Samsara. Whenever Setsuna instead followed through with the sacrifice, the Time Judge rewound time to repeat the cycle, though in this cycle Endir has been influencing events. The Time Judge resurrects the Reaper, who takes the name Fides, to aid them before fading away, leaving no means of rewinding time if the Dark Samsara wins.

The group fights and seemingly defeats the Dark Samsara, but it flees back through time to escape. To follow it, Endir and Setsuna use the traces left by their memories—the save points scattered through the world that only they can see—and follow the Dark Samsara after the others give up their magical energy to empower them. Travelling back to Setsuna's home on the day her mother left as a sacrifice, Endir defeats the Dark Samsara in its humanoid form. Setsuna then absorbs him into herself, granting the Dark Samsara access to her feelings and companionship, before asking Endir to destroy her body. The ending shows Aeterna vanishing with her mission completed, and the other party members go their separate ways. A post-credits scene shows Endir walking past a broadleaf tree in leaf, with Setsuna's spirit watching over him.

== Development ==
I am Setsuna was developed by Tokyo RPG Factory, a studio created by Square Enix and staffed by external staff to produce role-playing video games (RPGs). At the event, it was described by Square Enix as a "pure fantasy, true role-playing video game". The game was designed as a new intellectual property, with its future developments to be decided after Square Enix reviewed its post-launch reception and success. The concept for I am Setsuna was written in September 2014, with development beginning the following month. The alpha build was completed by August 2015. Atsushi Hashimoto acted as director, and Kengo Uchibori as producer. The production schedule was noted as being fairly short. The concept originated from plans to re-create a game similar to classic RPGs from the genre's "golden age". The staff was made up of developers who agreed with this vision. I am Setsuna was developed using the Unity game engine.

In keeping with the team goals, the battle system was adopted from role-playing games like early Final Fantasy titles and other games like Chrono Trigger. According to Hashimoto, Chrono Trigger was used as inspiration due to its popularity, it being a favorite of the assembled development team, and the fact that there were few spiritual successors to it on the market. They also drew influence from Dragon Quest, The Legend of Zelda, the SaGa and Mother series, and Xenogears. The playtime was designed to be similar to RPGs of the 90s, going against the prevalent trend of added content with the scale and power of gaming technology. The traditional battle system gave the development team a "sense of security" when faced with the challenges of developing the game. One of the difficult elements was balancing the game's difficulty so it could be enjoyed by both casual and hardcore gamers. The battle system was specifically based on the Active Time Battle system used in Chrono Trigger. The lack of established RPG elements, such as inns for resting and a world map, were influenced by the harsh setting and a wish to have players think about where to go.

A key theme running through the game is "sadness". The story's setting, a land covered by snow, and its general tone carried this theme, evoking the emotional stories of classic role-playing games. The theme also extends to its title, which stems from the word "setsunasa": while it holds a variety of meanings in Japanese, the meaning used by the production team was sadness or sorrow. "Setsuna" also translated as "a moment in time", which is tied into the game's SP battle mechanic. Much of the effort in writing went into the game's language, with the team obsessing over how players would respond to different words. For this reason, they used katakana as little as possible, instead using native kanji expressions for terms like "monster". Despite lacking katakana, the setting used writing schemes akin to those from European literature, giving the world a unique feel.

The scenario was co-written by Hirotaka Inaba and Makoto Goya. The game's central themes, which focused on life and death as represented by Setsuna's sacrifice, were included as part of the callback to earlier role-playing games. One of the main features of the hero's design was his mask, which made it harder for players to fully empathize with him. During early production, Hashimoto was putting relatively little effort in the scenario, expecting it not to change. The development team disliked how the scenario was developing and insisted on a rewrite that changed half the script despite the production's time constraints. The scenario's ending was not determined from the outset, with the writing team instead writing the script as if they were on the journey themselves based on the established theme. While the team wanted to continue producing games based on gameplay and thematic concepts, they considered I am Setsuna to be a standalone project without any need for a sequel. No CGI scenes were included, and some elements of the story were left up to interpretation as had been done in earlier titles.

From its foundation, Tokyo RPG Factory had drawn inspiration from the Japanese phrase setsugekka (Snow, Moon and Flowers) when choosing the visual themes for each planned game; I am Setsuna used the theme of snow. The snowy environment was chosen to emphasize the melancholy tone of the narrative. The character designs were done by Toi8; he was brought in at an early stage, and his designs were likewise meant to reinforce the atmosphere. When translating the design into the game's 3D models, the team shortened them and gave them a distinctive appearance by removing their feet. This was possible due to the snowy environment in most areas, which would theoretically hide the feet. The art director was Jun Suzuki.

=== Music ===
The game's music was composed by Tomoki Miyoshi, a young composer whose first notable score was for Soul Calibur V. Almost all tracks were performed on a solo piano played by Randy Kerber, who had worked on major films including Forrest Gump and Titanic. The score was recorded at the Eastwood Scoring Stage. Vocals were provided by Japanese singer Kotringo, and the sound director was Hiroaki Yura. Hashimoto wanted the score to be deeply melancholic and able to have sharp endings to tracks and sections, something a piano was good at. The instrument was chosen within the first few minutes of Miyoshi's first meeting with the team. Hashimoto also wanted an instrument that was recognized worldwide to convey the game's themes without language barriers. Miyoshi's approach to his compositions was driven by the game's narrative themes, drawing inspiration from the compositions of Joe Hisaishi.

The main theme was originally not written for the game, but Hashimoto insisted on its use after hearing it. Yura reflected that creating a soundtrack using only one instrument proved challenging at points due to the inability to use different instruments to indicate mood changes and character themes. Hashimoto said that other instruments could be used if necessary, but Miyoshi and Yura were able to create the score without them. The score had over seventy tracks created for it, all short pieces between one to one and a half minutes that would regularly loop in-game.

A two-disc soundtrack album was released on March 23, 2016. An arranged version of the soundtrack, Winter's End, was released by Creative Intelligence Arts on October 5. Miyoshi described the album as a new version inspired by fan performances of the soundtrack, with him creating a musical representation of Setsuna's journey. Miyoshi also needed to condense the most recognizable elements of the overall score into a smaller number of tracks than the game's music album, along with creating new parts to close off tracks originally intended to loop. While Miyoshi was generally allowed creative freedom, Yura wanted the score to include each main character's theme and the main theme. To keep a relaxing tone across the album, the combat themes were not included. Miyoshi performed on the piano, while Kotringo and Yura returned to provide vocals and additional violin.

== Release ==
The game was first announced at the 2015 Electronic Entertainment Expo as a game for the PlayStation 4 under the title Project Setsuna. During its promotion, the team were wary of openly referencing Chrono Trigger, as that might cause an excess of expectations among potential players. Its next showing was at that year's Tokyo Game Show, where its official Japanese title was revealed, along with its release on the PlayStation Vita. Its title in Japan is Ikenie to Yuki no Setsuna, roughly translated as "Setsuna of Sacrifice and Snow". There are no differences in content between the two versions of the game, with the only exception being that the PlayStation 4 version looks better on a large screen due to resolution issues. They also wanted to enable players to have a portable version, accommodating different playstyles. As of September 2015, development was reported as 60% complete. In November of the same year, the game's Japanese release date was revealed to be February 18, 2016.

In March 2016, Square Enix announced details regarding the game's English release, including its English title, I am Setsuna, and the fact that it would only be released on the PS4 and Microsoft Windows platforms, not on the Vita. According to Hashimoto, dropping the Vita in the West was due to a trend in Western gaming for full immersion. Another factor was the smaller Vita market in the West when compared to home consoles and PC gaming. Despite this decision, he said that there was still a chance for a Western Vita release if there was enough demand. The title was changed for the Western version as a direct translation of the original title would have lost language nuances relating to Setsuna's name. The game was translated and localized for the West by the independent company Dico. The PS4 and PC versions of I am Setsuna were released internationally on July 19, 2016.

The game was later announced as a worldwide launch title for the Nintendo Switch on March 3, 2017. A coliseum battle mode dubbed "Temporal Battle Arena" was released as downloadable content for the Switch version on April 13. The Switch port was co-developed by Tokyo RPG Factory and Gemdrops. Porting began in late 2016 and was made easier by their existing knowledge of the Unity engine and the fact that the Switch would support it. The team ran into some issues porting the game over, with one cited bug being the menu screens glitching between docked and handheld modes.

== Reception ==
Reception

Aggregate score
Aggregator	Score
Metacritic	PC: 70/100; PS4: 74/100; NS: 75/100

Review scores
Publication	Score
Eurogamer	Recommended
Famitsu	32/40
Game Informer	7.5/10
GameSpot	7/10
IGN	7.5/10
Nintendo Life	7/10
Nintendo World Report	6.5/10
PC Gamer (US)	70/100
Polygon	8.5/10
Dengeki PlayStation	75/90/75/85

According to Media Create, the PlayStation 4 and PlayStation Vita versions of I am Setsuna debuted at #6 and #7 respectively. The PlayStation 4 version sold 33,629, while the PlayStation Vita version sold 27,994, bringing total sales to roughly 66,000 units. By the following week, the Vita version had dropped out of the top 20, while the PlayStation 4 version had sold a further 6,619 units. During its first year, Tokyo RPG Factory recorded a heavy loss for its parent company, though this was not seen as unusual given its status as a new studio. By the following year, the studio had earned a substantial profit from continued sales of I am Setsuna.

Japanese gaming magazine Famitsu praised the game as an enjoyable throwback to the 90s era of JRPGs, praising its simplified design and atmosphere. The reviewers for Dengeki PlayStation similarly noted these features, thinking it was an enjoyable title for its price and audience. Simon Parkin, writing for Eurogamer, lauded the tight focus of its plot and game design, praising it as a good homage to the games that had inspired it. PC Gamer's Leif Johnson similarly praised the game's simplicity of design, with his main complaints being a lack of side content and innovative features. Peter Brown of GameSpot felt the game was held back by adhering too closely to its inspirations, summarizing it as "an unapologetic homage to beloved Japanese RPGs that plays well but takes few risks."

Liam Croft of Nintendo Life felt the game would appeal more to genre veterans than newcomers due to a lack of engaging elements outside its combat system. Philip Kollar of Polygon, while noting a lack of original elements, was positive and stated that the game "demonstrates a great understanding and mastery of what made Square Enix's past successes work so well." Game Informer's Joe Juba enjoyed the game but felt its story and systems were too strongly rooted in the games it was emulating to stand out, Vince Ingenito of IGN noted that the deeper he got into the game, the more original elements he found in the story and combat, ultimately feeling the game defied its inspirations rather than mimicking them. Donald Theriault of Nintendo World Report felt the game was let down by some of its aesthetic and gameplay design but otherwise found the core experience strong.

From review aggregate website Metacritic, out of 100 points, the game earned scores of 70 for PC, 74 for PS4 and 75 for Switch. These scores were summarized as a "mixed or average" reception for PC and "generally favorable" for PS4 and Switch. The narrative met with general praise from reviewers for its somber tone, and emotional weight. Some felt the plot was either derivative or rushed to conclusion. The battle system and related mechanics met with general praise, though several negatively noted some limitations in its functions and slow speed. Ingenito, Juba and Brown faulted issues with the game's low difficulty. There was also frequent criticism of menu management, and a lack of content outside combat. The lack of visual variety and depressing effect of the game's snowy landscapes was disliked by several reviewers. Talking about the Switch port specifically, Croft was positive about the conversion, but Ingenito and Theriault noted technical and localization issues respectively. The piano score met with both praise for its impact, and criticism for the lack of variety or derivative melodies.

== Future projects ==
Tokyo RPG Staff confirmed in later interviews that they had concepts for three game titles from their foundation, inspired by the setsugekka phrase. Following the completion of I am Setsuna, Tokyo RPG Factory began concept development on their next project. Titled Lost Sphear, it used a refined version of the combat of I am Setsuna with a new setting and story. Their third title, Oninaki (2019), changed to an action-based combat system and went for a darker narrative tone. Hashimoto and Inaba were involved in all three titles. Tokyo RPG Factory was eventually absorbed into Square Enix in 2024.
