= Shinagawa no Tsuki, Yoshiwara no Hana, and Fukagawa no Yuki =

Paintings by Kitagawa Utamaro

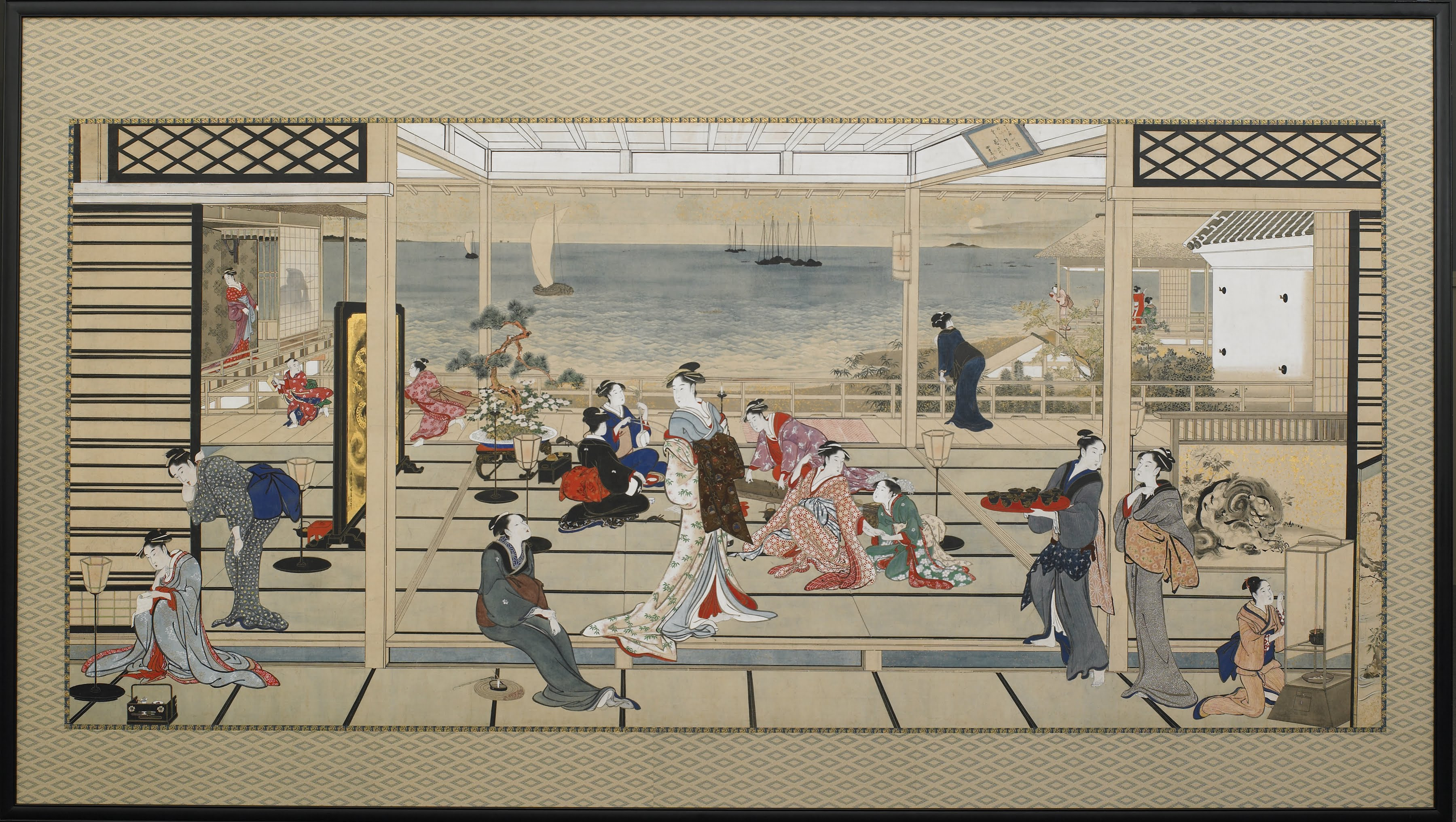
Shinagawa no Tsuki, Utamaro, hanging-scroll painting made with coloured inks on paper, c. 1788–1791

Shinagawa no Tsuki (品川の月, "Moon in Shinagawa"), Yoshiwara no Hana (吉原の花, "Flowers in Yoshiwara"), and Fukagawa no Yuki (深川の雪, "Snow in Fukagawa") are three hanging-scroll paintings corresponding to the themes of "moon", "flowers", and "snow", respectively. These were produced in the late 18th century by the Japanese ukiyo-e artist Kitagawa Utamaro (c. 1753 – 1806) for the prominent merchant Zenno Ihē.

The paintings have a reputation as Utamaro's most ambitious works. They are unusually large, and were executed in high-quality coloured pigments on imported Chinese Xuan paper. Utamaro made the paintings from about 1788 to about 1801–1804; it is not known why they took so long to complete. In the 1880s, they came into European collections and were soon split up; two are now in American collections, and the other is back in Japan. After their first known public display together in 1879, they were not exhibited together again until 2016.

== Background ==
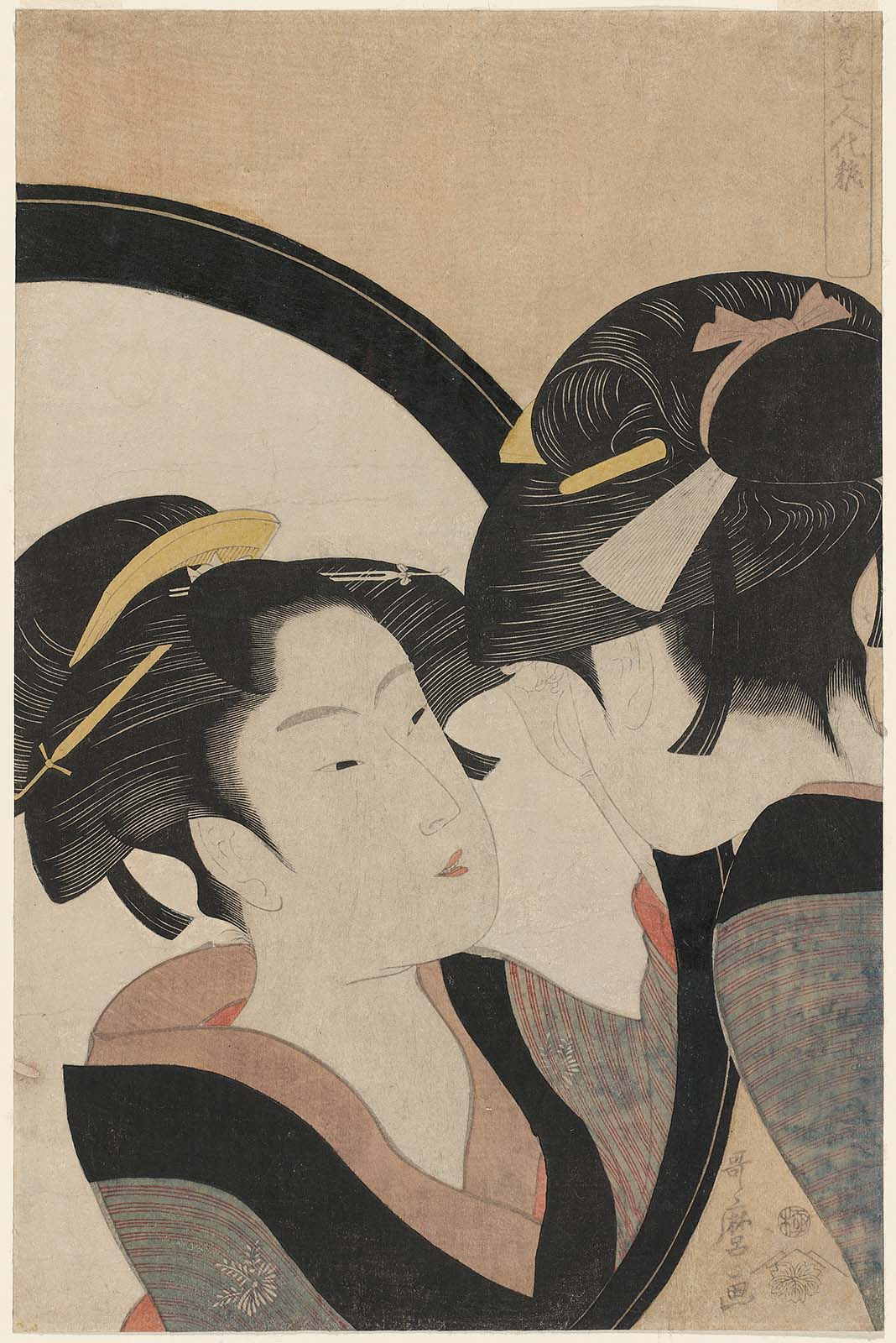

Ukiyo-e art flourished in Japan during the Edo period from the 17th to 19th centuries, and took as its primary subjects courtesans, kabuki actors, geisha and others associated with the "floating world" lifestyle of the pleasure districts. Alongside paintings, mass-produced woodblock prints were a major form of the genre. In the mid-18th century, full-colour nishiki-e prints became common, printed using a large number of woodblocks, one for each colour. A prominent genre was bijin-ga ("pictures of beauties"), which depicted most often courtesans and geisha at leisure, and promoted the entertainments of the pleasure districts.

Kitagawa Utamaro (c. 1753–1806) made his name in the 1790s with his bijin ōkubi-e ("large-headed pictures of beautiful women") portraits, focusing on the head and upper torso, a style others had previously employed in portraits of kabuki actors. Utamaro experimented with line, colour, and printing techniques to bring out subtle differences in the features, expressions, and backdrops of subjects from a wide variety of class and background. Utamaro's individuated beauties were in sharp contrast to the stereotyped, idealized images that had been the norm.

Utamaro is less known for his paintings (nikuhitsu-ga) than for the large number of woodblock prints he produced, of which about 2,000 are known. 53 of his paintings are known, many of which have been discovered only in the 21st century. Utamaro's paintings have received relatively little critical attention.

== Execution and history ==
The earliest of the paintings was made c. 1788 and the last c. 1801–1804. They are dated based on comparison to the styles Utamaro used in his other works. It is unknown why the paintings took so long to execute, or whether Utamaro executed them alone or with the help of those in his workshop. The paintings are unsigned, and are the only known paintings Utamaro did not sign.

The paintings were commissioned by the prominent merchant Zenno Ihē (善野 伊兵衛) of Shimotsuke Province (roughly modern Tochigi Prefecture). The city of Tochigi prospered as a trading centre connected by waterways to Edo (modern Tokyo); the arts also thrived there, and Utamaro had connections with those in Tochigi's kyōka poetry circles. Ihē was the uncle of Zenno Kihē IV (４代目善野喜兵衛, Yon-daime Zenno Kihē), who published poetry under the name Tsūyōtei Tokunari (通用亭 徳成), a poet who had his work published in kyōka anthologies that included poems by Utamaro. (Note: Utamaro published poetry under the name Fude no Ayamaru (筆綾丸).) A find of seven Utamaro paintings in Tochigi in 1936 indicates a relationship with the city and has brought speculation that he travelled there. He is said to have visited Tochigi at least three times, though evidence of this has not been found, and the shop the Zenno family owned had an Edo branch where Utamaro could have had contact with Ihē.

The first record (Note: The catalogue for the event lists the paintings as: Setsugekka-zu shihon mono, sanpukuzui, Zenno-shi Zō (「雪月花図紙本大物 三幅対 善野氏蔵」, "Pictures of snow, moon, flowers; set of three; owned by Zenno")) of the paintings' public display together was in 1879, when a member of the Zenno merchant family had them at the temple Jōgan-ji (定願寺) in the city of Tochigi on 23 November 1879. It is not known what happened to the paintings after this, but at the height of the popularity of Japonism in the Western world, Yoshiwara no Hana and Fukagawa no Yuki somehow came into the possession of the Parisian art dealer Siegfried Bing, who photographed them in 1887. He bought Shinagawa no Tsuki some years later, and a Japanese collector later purchased it and brought it back to Japan in 1939. Its whereabouts became unknown after an exhibition in 1948, until its rediscovery in 2012. The other two were purchased by American art galleries. The three were not displayed together again until 2016, when they were brought together for display at the Wadsworth Atheneum.

The paintings have a reputation as Utamaro's most ambitious works. According to the art historian Shūgō Asano, "The snow—moon—flowers paintings are extraordinary even amongst Utamaro's nikuhitsu-ga paintings." To the art historian Tadashi Kobayashi, the paintings' "compositional power and dynamic postures are magnificent".

== Description and analysis ==
The Zenno family crest appears in two of the paintings.

The paintings are on the themes of "moon" (Shinagawa no Tsuki), "flowers" (Yoshiwara no Hana), and "snow" (Fukagawa no Yuki); "Moon", "flowers", and "snow" was a popular traditional artistic theme in Japan. Utamaro depicts one of the three most representative officially-approved yūkaku pleasure districts in each of the paintings: Yoshiwara, Shinagawa, and Fukagawa. There are no male figures in any of the three paintings, though as the yūkaku existed for male pleasure, the exclusion was almost certainly deliberate.

The three paintings are Utamaro's largest known works. They depict extravagantly-dressed women such as courtesans and geisha of the pleasure districts; these women would have been surrounded by men demanding their services in real life, but no men appear in the paintings. On the kimono of the women in each of Shinagawa no Tsuki and Fukagawa no Yuki appears the kumaizasa (九枚笹, "nine sasa leaves")—the nine-leafed sasa crest of the Zenno family.

It was rare for paintings to be of such a large size. They are on Xuan paper, a type of paper made in China. Edo-period Japan had not developed the skill to make it, and as the Japanese government maintained a policy of isolation with severely restricted foreign trade, Zenno may have obtained the paper for Utamaro in secret. The inks are believed to be of a particularly high quality, from evidence such that when cleaned with water they do not smudge. Executing the paintings would have required a large working space with carefully controlled humidity. These conditions suggests a great expense went into the paintings, and point to an extremely high regard for Utamaro as an artist.

=== Shinagawa no Tsuki ===
Shinagawa no Tsuki (品川の月, "Moon in Shinagawa") (late 18th century)) is also known as Tsukimi no Zashiki Zu (月見の座敷図, "Picture of parlour moon-viewing") or Moonlight Revelry at Dozō Sagami. The horizontal painting is a hanging scroll in ink on two joined sheets of Xuan paper together measuring 147.4 by 321 centimetres (58 in × 126 in). It was made c. 1788 and is believed to be the first of the series. It resides in the collection of the Freer Gallery of Art in Washington, D.C.

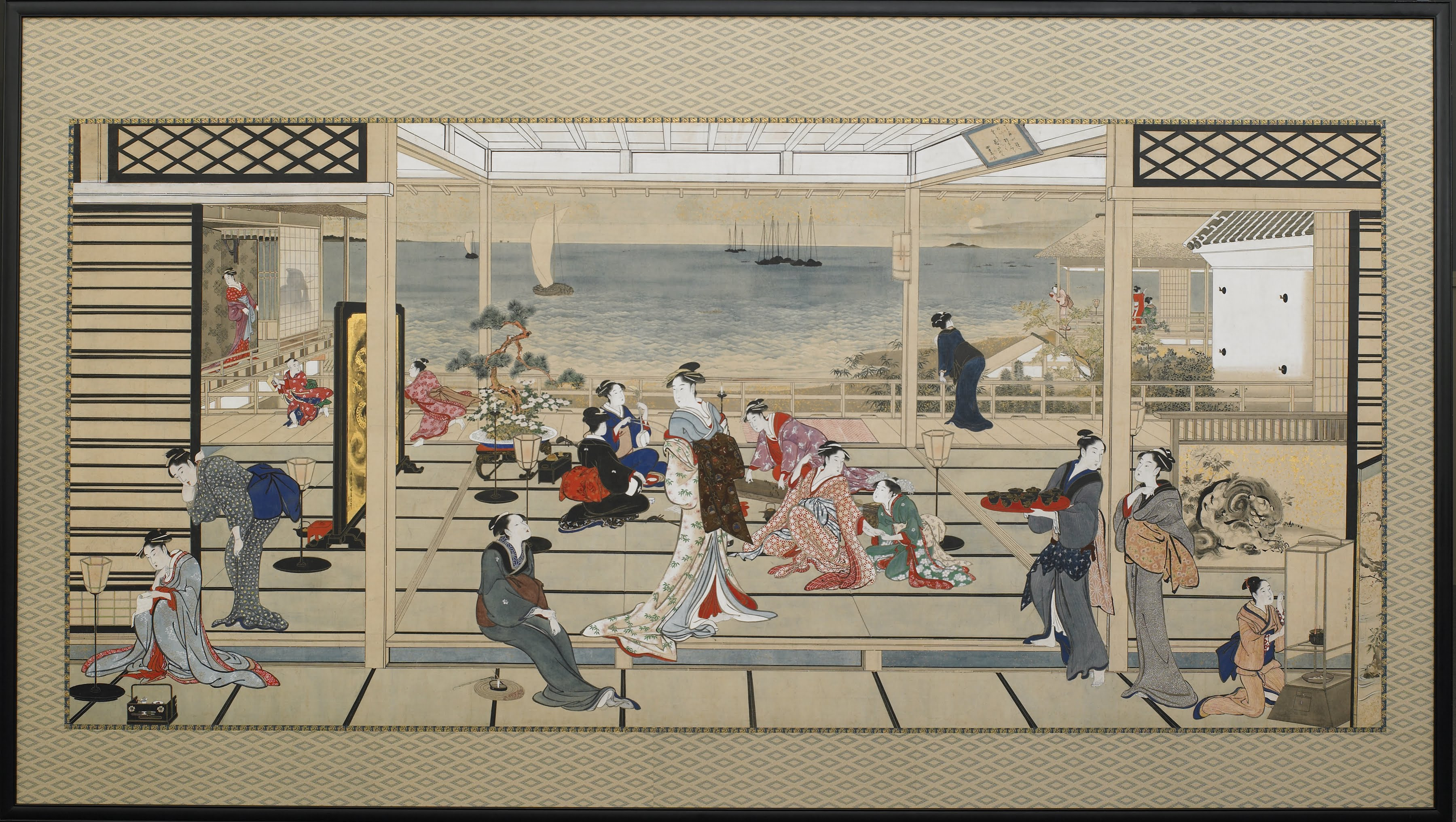

The scene takes place at an evening party under a full moon in a two-story yūkaku pleasure house called the Sagamiya (相模屋), also called the Dozō Sagami (土蔵相模) in Shinagawa, near the administrative capital of Edo. It was owned by Sagamiya Chūbei (相良屋 忠兵衛) and was the most prosperous pleasure house in Shinagawa.

Utamaro places 16 figures throughout the painting, all of whom are women with the exception of a young boy playing at the mid-left, and the shadow of a man smoking behind a shōji door further behind the boy. The point of view looks out on the sea, and the moon appears over it in the distance to the right. Utamaro uses an elevated point of view traditional to Japanese art while employing European-style geometric perspective principles to give the architecture a sense of depth. Such techniques began to have an influence on Japanese art in the 18th century. Utamaro was yet to develop a distinct style of his own at this point, and the influence of Torii Kiyonaga on his depiction of the figures is strong.

A framed kyōka poem by Yomo no Akara (poetic pen name of Ōta Nanpo) hanging from the ceiling in the upper right reads:

Japanese text	Romanized Japanese	English translation
照る月の か々みをぬいて 樽まくら 雪もこん〱 花もさけ〱	Teru tsuki no kagami o nuite taru-makura yuki mo konkon hana mo sakesake	Snow may snow, Blooms may bloom; Under the moonshine, Be happy with a barrel pillow.

Kamaya Ihē commissioned the paintings in the late 18th century. Shinagawa no Tsuki was in the collection of the Paris-based Japanese art dealer Tadamasa Hayashi (1853–1906). In 1903 Charles Lang Freer obtained it from Hayashi and later donated it to the Freer Gallery of Art, where it now resides.

=== Yoshiwara no Hana ===
Yoshiwara no Hana (吉原の花, "Flowers in Yoshiwara") (c. 1791–92) is believed to have been the second painting executed in the series. The horizontal painting is a hanging scroll of eight joined sheets of Xuan paper, together measuring 186.7 by 256.9 centimetres (73.5 in × 101.1 in), and executed in ink in c. 1791–92. Since 1957 it has resided in the collection of the Wadsworth Atheneum in Hartford, Connecticut.

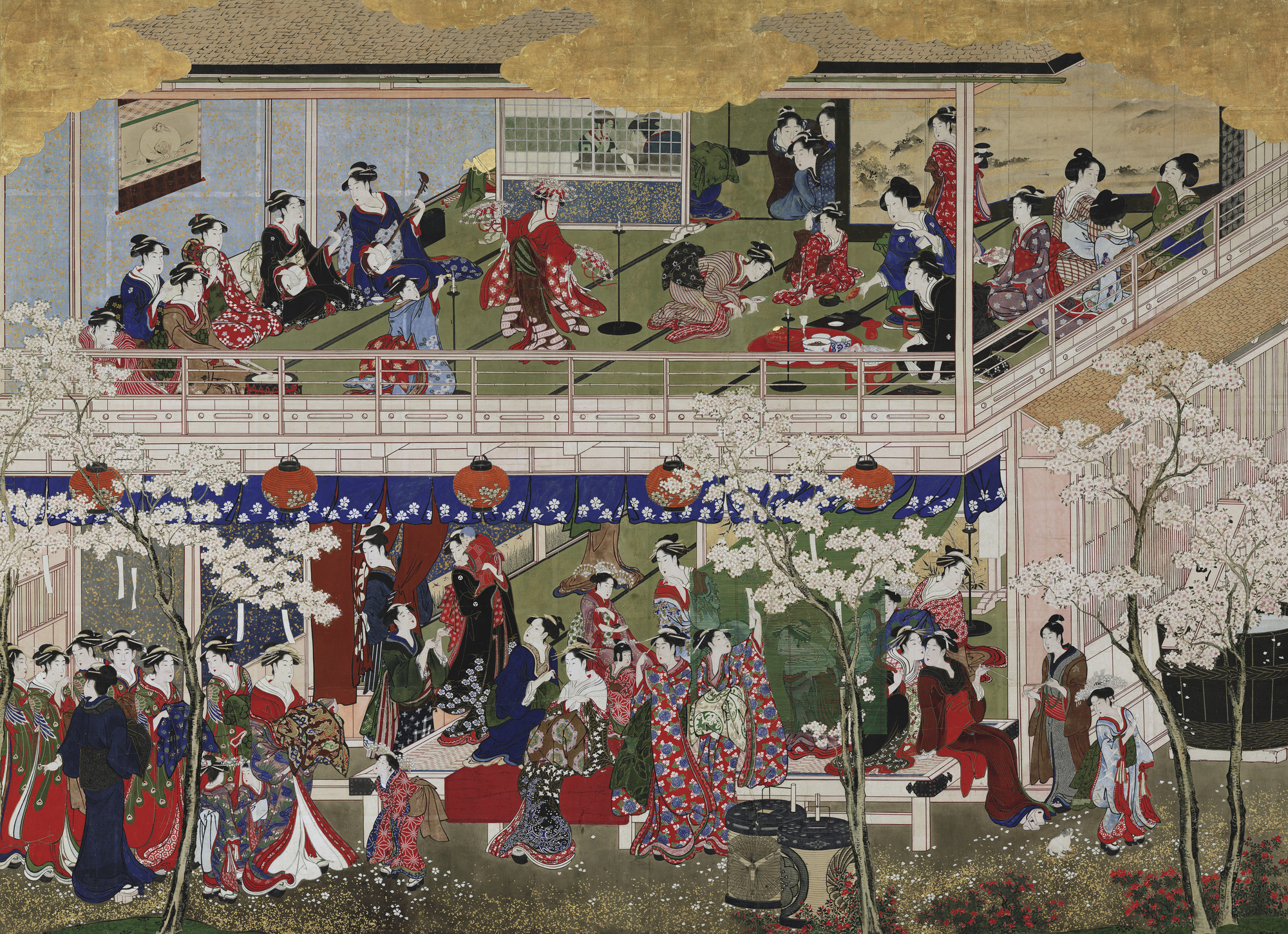

The painting shows a hanami cherry blossom–viewing party in the Yoshiwara pleasure district in Edo. 45 figures appear in it. The scene is a teahouse, though one of a more exaggerated grandeur than a real one. A sign of spring, sakura cherry-blossom petals fall all around, and azaleas bloom in the bottom right.

The women are of different ranks and status, signified by their manner of dress and hairstyles—the more complex, the higher the rank. In the bottom left is a group of women led by high-ranking oiran courtesans in bright reds and blues. They are identifiable as oiran from having their obi sashes tied at the front of them. In the centre sits another oiran on a deep red carpet wearing an uchikake

On the second floor sit a number of women wearing katahazushi hairstyles and dressed in the manner the women-in-waiting of the households of high-ranking samurai or daimyō (feudal lords). They are spectators to a dance performance—what appears to be a zashiki kyōgen, a style of kabuki theatre adapted to performance in private samurai homes. The women to the left play music on the shamisen and tsuzumi hand-drums for the dancers.

=== Fukagawa no Yuki ===
Fukagawa no Yuki (深川の雪, "Snow in Fukagawa") depicts a temporary brothel in Fukagawa with the theme of 'snow'. The horizontal painting is a hanging scroll in coloured pigments on eight joined sheets of Xuan paper, together measuring 198.8 by 341.1 centimetres (78.3 in × 134.3 in). The painting resides in the collection of the Okada Museum of Art in the town of Hakone in Japan.

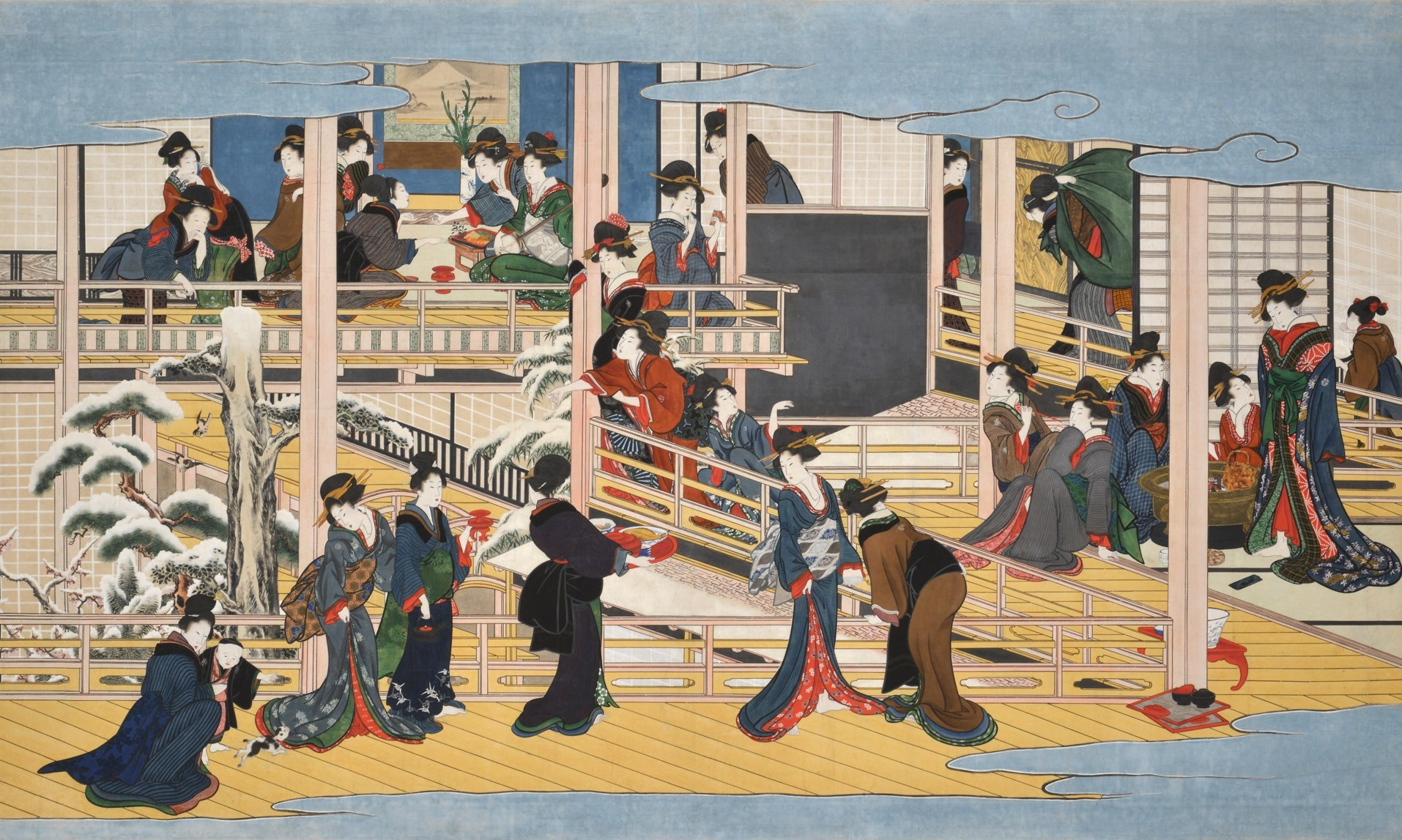

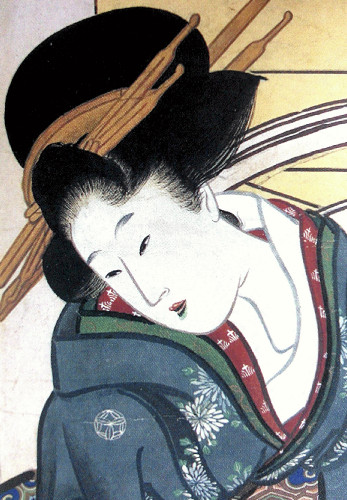
The Zenno family crest appears on the shoulder of this woman's kimono in Fukagawa no Yuki.

Utamaro achieves a strong compositional balance despite the painting's complexity. He distributes 27 figures throughout it amongst several buildings, such as a teahouse duplexes and a second-storey restaurant-teahouse at the left. The main building appears to be a two-story restaurant-teahouse; the picture focuses on an atrium with a garden court in the middle surrounded by railings, revealing the snowy outdoors. With the exception of the young boy who reaches out at a cat in the lower left, all the figures are women, though in real life the guests of a pleasure house would be men. Several of the figures pose in a manner similar to those in the book Seirō Ehon Nenjū Gyōji (青楼絵本年中行事) (1804) that Utamaro illustrated around the time he completed this painting, such as the woman looking behind her in the hallway in the centre, the woman with her arm wrapped around a pillar in the centre, and the woman crouched down near her with her hand on the railing, looking to the right behind her.

Several women lean over the rails to check the snow. A woman in the bottom left stops and looks down behind her at a cat tugging at her kimono; the kimono bears the Zenno family's kumaizasa crest on the shoulder. In the middle a woman carries a tray of food along the hallway. A group of guests sits around a hibachi heating device in a room at the right. In the upper right a woman carries a large furoshiki bundle full of the courtesans' and geishas' bedclothes. (Note: This was a custom of the Fukagawa pleasure district.) Several women in a back room sit playing hand games. The women's kimono tend to be of subdued colours such as indigo or brown, in contrast with the bright, flashy colours of the other two paintings.

It is believed Utamaro made the painting in c. 1801–1804. The ukiyo-e collector Takeo Nagase purchased Fukagawa no Yuki in Paris from an ukiyo-e art dealer from Japan and brought it back to Japan in 1939. It was displayed in an exhibition ("Second Famous Works of Ukiyo-e Exhibition" (第２回浮世絵名作展覧会, Dai-nikai Ukiyo-e Meisaku Tenrankai)) at the Matsuzakaya department store in the Ginza district of Tokyo in 1948. Thereafter the painting's whereabouts became unknown, and researchers made do with only black-and-white photography. The art dealer Seiichirō Teramoto rediscovered it in January 2012, and had its authenticity confirmed by Shūgō Asano. It was purchased by the Okada Museum of Art, which has declined to name who had it or where it was found. It has since had touch-up work done by a Chinese restorer.
