= Tokyo RPG Factory =

Japanese video game developer

Tokyo RPG Factory Co., Ltd.
- Type: Subsidiary
- Industry: Video games
- Founded: 2014; 12 years ago
- Founders: Yosuke Matsuda
- Defunct: 2024; 2 years ago
- Fate: Merged with Square Enix
- Headquarters: 6-27-30 Shinjuku, Shinjuku-ku, Tokyo
- Key people: Yosuke Matsuda; Atsushi Hashimoto; Takashi Tokita
- Products: I am Setsuna; Lost Sphear; Oninaki
- Net income: ▲¥56 million (2022)
- Number of employees: 10 (2017)
- Parent: Square Enix
- Website: www.tokyorpgfactory.com

Tokyo RPG Factory Co., Ltd. (Japanese: 株式会社Tokyo RPG Factory) was a Japanese video game developer and subsidiary of Square Enix, a company known for its work in the role-playing genre. The company was founded in August 2014 under the name "Tokyo Dream Factory" by Yosuke Matsuda, who became president of Square Enix in 2013. During its lifetime, three titles were developed to varying degrees of critical and commercial success: I am Setsuna (2016), Lost Sphear (2017) and Oninaki (2019), each themed after a component of the Japanese concept of setsugekka ("snow, moon and flowers").

Tokyo RPG Factory was founded to develop games inspired by titles from the "golden age" of RPGs. Its structure, which brings in freelancers and staff volunteering from other departments within Square Enix, is modelled on Western film and game studios. Recurring staff members for their projects are director Atsushi Hashimoto and scenario writer Hirotaka Inaba. Noted Square Enix staff member Takashi Tokita provided input on the first two titles before taking on a creative role in Oninaki. The studio was merged into Square Enix in January 2024.

== History ==
=== Origin and staff ===
Beginning in March 2013, Square Enix—known for its work in the role-playing video game (RPG) genre—underwent structural and policy changes when Yoichi Wada stepped down as president and was replaced by Yosuke Matsuda. Matsuda wanted to steer the company towards a more "individual" identity for products amid rising production costs and changing consumer demands. During this time, discussions were held internally about setting up a group within the company focused on creating new games inspired by the themes, art and game design of RPGs produced during the genre's golden age in the 1990s, such as Chrono Trigger and entries in the Final Fantasy series. This move was partially made in response to the success of foreign homages to golden age titles. Matsuda spearheaded this initiative. Taking inspiration from the corporate structure of outsourcing and freelancing staff common with Western movies and video game development, Matsuda "bypassed" Square Enix's corporate structure to create a small-scale subsidiary studio which would feature freelance guest developers working alongside company staff.

Matsuda invited a number of people from across Square Enix and from the freelance community to participate, and the studio was created around them. The developer was founded in August 2014 under the name "Tokyo Dream Factory". Their aim was to create original titles within small budgets, and they were given high creative freedom within their design goals. The following year, the studio changed to its current title, representing its chosen genre and development goals, with the name being created collaboratively by the staff. As part of his goals for the studio, Matsuda put in a policy of allowing staff members from other departments to volunteer rather than being assigned there.

Acting as a wholly owned subsidiary of Square Enix, the developer was based in Tokyo, Japan. In 2017, the developer had ten regular employees, with others joining in if they wished. A recurring staff member was Atsushi Hashimoto, who acted as the three games' director. Scenario writer Hirotaka Inaba also worked on all their games, collaborating on their first two with Makoto Goya. Takashi Tokita, known for his work on Chrono Trigger, provided input for the battle systems of the first two games, then took a deeper creative role in the third.

=== Game development ===
For their three games, Tokyo RPG Factory drew thematic and visual inspiration from the Japanese concept of setsugekka ("snow, moon and flowers"), an artistic theme in which each component serves as a metonym for its associated season. Work began on their first title, originally announced under the codename Project Setsuna, in 2014. Matsuno had a plan for multiple related titles related to Tokyo RPG Factory's IP, though this first game was created as a standalone project without plans for direct sequels. The game, eventually titled I am Setsuna, drew mechanical inspiration for its Active Time Battle system from Chrono Trigger. The story was created around themes of sadness and sacrifice. It used the visual theme of "snow". Released worldwide in 2016, I am Setsuna saw positive responses from fans, and despite initial losses turned a major profit for the company by the end of 2017.

Following I am Setsuna, the team began work on another similar project, carrying over some terminology and elements from their first game but otherwise creating a standalone experience. This second project was Lost Sphear, which used the story and gameplay theme of "memory" in its design. This game used the visual theme of "moon". Released in 2017 in Japan and 2018 in the West, Lost Sphear was again profitable though earnings fell compared to 2017.

During the later development of Lost Sphear, the studio's third game was being planned out, with Tokita taking on the role of creative producer and having input on the narrative. This game used the visual theme of "flower". At Tokita's urging, Inaba wrote a more mature narrative than previous titles from the developer, focusing on death-related themes and examining the concept of reincarnation. While it saw strong positive responses from players, Tokyo RPG Factory suffered a financial loss during that period due to low sales. Following the release of Oninaki, the studio staff began discussion concepts for a fourth game. During its final three years, Tokyo RPG Factory showed consistent sales profits. The studio was merged back into Square Enix in January 2024.

== Titles ==
Year	Title	Platform(s)	Reference
2016	I am Setsuna (Note: Known as Ikenie to Yuki no Setsuna (いけにえと雪のセツナ; lit. "Setsuna of Sacrifice and Snow") in Japan)	PlayStation 4, PlayStation Vita, Nintendo Switch, Microsoft Windows	
2017	Lost Sphear	PlayStation 4, Nintendo Switch, Microsoft Windows	
2019	Oninaki (Note: Known as Oni no Naku Kuni (鬼ノ哭ク邦; lit. "Country Where the Ogre Cries", translated in-game as "The Wailing Land") in Japan)	PlayStation 4, Nintendo Switch, Microsoft Windows	
