= Oninaki =

2019 video game

- Developer: Tokyo RPG Factory
- Publisher: Square Enix
- Director: Atsushi Hashimoto
- Producers: Ryutaro Sasaki; Takashi Tokita
- Programmer: Ryouhei Sasaki
- Artist: Taiki
- Writers: Hirotaka Inaba; Takashi Tokita
- Composers: Shunsuke Tsuchiya; Mariam Abounnasr
- Engine: Unity
- Platforms: Nintendo Switch; PlayStation 4; Windows
- Release: WW: August 22, 2019
- Genre: Action role-playing
- Mode: Single-player

Oninaki (Note: Japanese: 鬼ノ哭ク邦, Hepburn: Oni no Naku Kuni; lit. "Country Where the Ogre Cries", translated in-game as "The Wailing Land") is a 2019 action role-playing game developed by Tokyo RPG Factory and published by Square Enix for the Nintendo Switch, PlayStation 4 and Windows. Gameplay has players exploring dungeon areas selected from a world map, fighting enemies in real-time combat with spirit weapons called Daemons while shifting between the worlds of the living and the dead. Oninaki is set in a world where the doctrine of reincarnation is enforced by figures called Watchers, who assist in the passing of souls and fight monsters born of regret. The player controls the Watcher Kagachi as he confronts a shrouded figure called the Night Devil, uncovering hidden truths surrounding the cycle of reincarnation and his own past life.

Concept work began in 2017 during the last stages of Lost Sphear's development. Takashi Tokita, noted for his work on Chrono Trigger, came on board as a creative producer and pushed writer Hirotaka Inaba's story in a darker direction than his earlier work. The gameplay and graphics were also changed, becoming more action-focused and cinematic. The music was composed by Shunsuke Tsuchiya and Mariam Abounnasr of Procyon Studio. The game has received mixed reviews from critics upon release, with praise going to its mature setting and art design, though several criticised its story delivery and gameplay. It was the last game produced by Tokyo RPG Factory before its closure in 2024.

== Gameplay ==
Oninaki protagonist Kagachi uses an axe-type Daemon to fight a group of Fallen.

Oninaki is an action role-playing game where players take on the role of the Watcher Kagachi, who battles monsters called the Fallen while exploring the game world through two planes; the Living World and the afterlife world known as the "Beyond". Players view environments from an isometric angle, with Kagachi exploring dungeon environments completing both story-based and optional quests. Standard enemies roam the dungeon environments, attacking Kagachi on sight, while many areas end with a boss encounter.

During exploration and combat, Kagachi can find Healing Salves which restore health, upgrade artifacts, and grant new weapons. During combat in the Beyond, Kagachi gives and takes more damage. In the Beyond, the environment shifts, allowing for new routes to open or allowing access to teleport points for travelling between different areas. Players must explore both worlds in order to progress through the game, with areas that must be first explored in the world of the living, otherwise Kagachi must navigate a black void in the Beyond and can be killed in one hit by enemies. By defeating Fallen, Kagachi earns experience points which raise his basic statistics.

Kagachi battles the Fallen using Daemons, spirits manifesting as weapons. Starting off with a basic sword Daemon, Kagachi gains more Daemons as the story progresses. Each Daemon comes with a different weapon type, such as scythes, axes and spears. Daemons have different weapon-based skills, mapped to four different control buttons, each with a cooldown timer after use. Using a Daemon increases an affinity meter; reaching 100% raises Kagachi's attack power, while going above 150% begins decreasing his defence. When at 100% and above, Kagachi can trigger an empowered state. Using a Daemon in combat earns Soul Stones which unlock that Daemon's skill tree; unlocks include new combat abilities which are equipped to three of the four buttons, stat increases, and small cutscenes related to the Daemon's narrative. Using skills repeatedly unlocks bonuses for that attack. New weapons found during exploration and combat can be equipped to Daemons, with these weapons having slots for upgrade gems, which increase weapons stats.

== Synopsis ==
Kagachi is a Watcher, a person charged with defending the Cycle of Reincarnation, killing monsters formed from regret with spirit weapons called Daemons and helping spirits pass into their next life by any means necessary. Kagachi works closely with both Kushi, his adopted father, and Mayura, Kushi's daughter, operating from the world's only city Szaka. In the aftermath of a mission against a cult rebelling against the Cycle of Reincarnation, Kagachi meets a girl who does not remember who she is, and so he names her Linne. She is being hunted by the Night Devil, a powerful spirit who hounds Kagachi and gives aid to the cult in undermining the current monarch Lobelia. Lobelia and her son Leo instruct the Watchers to focus on destroying the cult over their other duties, causing friction within the Watchers. During one mission against the cult, Mayura is killed and Kagachi helps free her spirit. The Night Devil confronts Kagachi several times, possessing Watchers with his hatred and eventually using Kushi as his host.

Kushi incites a rebellion, with the people demanding spiritual equality with the elite surrounding Lobelia. Kagachi tries to reason with the mob, but they attack and force him to kill them. As Kagachi confronts Lobelia, Kushi appears and reveals that Lobelia usurped the throne after having the last true sovereign Sara executed. Kushi attacks, but Leo protects Lobelia at the cost of his life. Kagachi then defeats Kushi, learning as he dies that the Night Devil is a Daemon filled with hatred that wants to end the world. Lobelia further reveals that the true sovereign was key to preserving the world, and a terrible force has been preparing itself since she ended the bloodline. Kagachi finds the Night Devil: Kagachi then learns that the Night Devil is a fragment of Kagachi from a previous life when Kagachi was named Soju, the banished brother of the true sovereign. After defeating the Night Devil and absorbing him, Kagachi kills himself to quell his hatred. Linne, transforming into an adult form, prays for Kagachi to make a new future as a monster emerges from underground to destroy the world.

Awakening as Soju in the past, Kagachi pieces together his history; raised by an assassin's guild, Soju acted as a precursor to the Watchers as he carried out the last wishes of lingering spirits. After one such mission, he was killed. Meeting Sara, he realises that "Linne" was her spirit. Sara explains that the sovereign must keep the Oni, a manifestation of the despair humans discard during reincarnation, from awakening; the monster seen awakening in Kagachi's last life was the Oni. They go to the First Pillar, an ancient magical landmark, and view murals of humans defeating the Oni and Sara's ancestress establishing Szaka, with the Oni sleeping under it. Journeying into the palace and entering the pool of despair at its heart, Kagachi experiences the hopes of those who fought the Oni in ancient times as he escapes; during this time he sees Szaka, called here the Wailing Land where the Oni sleeps.

The Oni is revealed to have created the Cycle of Reincarnation to nourish itself with despair, heralded and nurtured by a human avatar called the Oni Priestess; with each awakening and defeat, the Oni destroyed a little more of the world, until only a portion of it remains. Its next awakening will destroy the world, also leading to the Oni's demise without humans to feed it. Kagachi confronts Sara, the current Oni Priestess, and she asks him to decide the world's fate as a piece of the Oni himself. Kagachi can choose to accept the Oni's awakening and the world's end, or fight Sara. Defeating Sara, he then destroys the awakened Oni. Kagachi then chooses to either kill himself or watch over the world from the Beyond.

== Development ==
Discussions and concept work for Oninaki began in 2017, during the last stages of development for Lost Sphear. Oninaki was the last of three titles conceptually planned by Tokyo RPG Factory when it was founded to work on I am Setsuna (2016). The basic plan was for a game built on the resources of the previous two games. A notable addition to the staff was Takashi Tokita, who had gained fame for his work on Chrono Trigger, Live A Live and Parasite Eve. Having previously provided creative input for the battle systems of its earlier titles, Tokita decided that this time he wanted a deeper creative role. Tokita was a general overseer for the project as creative producer, as well as helping create the basic world view and scenario. Main producer Ryutaro Sasaki, who had a supporting role in the company's earlier titles, supervised the gameplay and technical side of production. Atsushi Hashimoto returned as director from Lost Sphear and I am Setsuna, as did scenario writer Hirotaka Inaba. Oninaki used the Unity game engine.

The game's earliest concepts included the continued use of the turn-based combat system from I am Setsuna and Lost Sphear, with Kagachi fighting alone to protect the young Linne. Tokita wanted the studio's games pushing for reinvention, something he compared to the drastic gameplay changes between Final Fantasy and Final Fantasy II, which later led to the SaGa series. There was internal opposition to the change at first, but Hashimoto brought the staff round to the idea. Hashimoto was also exhausted with the turn-based system. Hashimoto wanted the ability for Kagachi to switch jobs, a term referring to schools of skills characters can learn such as magician or warrior. Hashimoto also wanted the character to be able to switch between jobs in real-time, which contributed to the shift from turn-based to action-based gameplay.

The shift between the real world and the Beyond started as a joke about moving between the worlds of I am Setsuna and Lost Sphear, but eventually became one of the founding elements of Oninaki. The game's dualistic story themes were derived from this style of shifting gameplay. Sasaki was initially aiming for a 20-hour experience, but Tokita pushed for a longer campaign, so it was eventually extended to past 30 hours. The Daemon system, compared by Hashimoto to the job system of Final Fantasy V, was designed so players would not end up hitting roadblocks because some boss enemies were weak to job types the player had not focused on. A notable Daemon cut during development was a human-monster hybrid who used tarot cards in combat. The weapon drop system was inspired by item drops in Kid Icarus: Uprising, a game which Hashimoto had worked on at Project Sora. An important element was keeping the gameplay accessible to casual players.

=== Scenario and art design ===
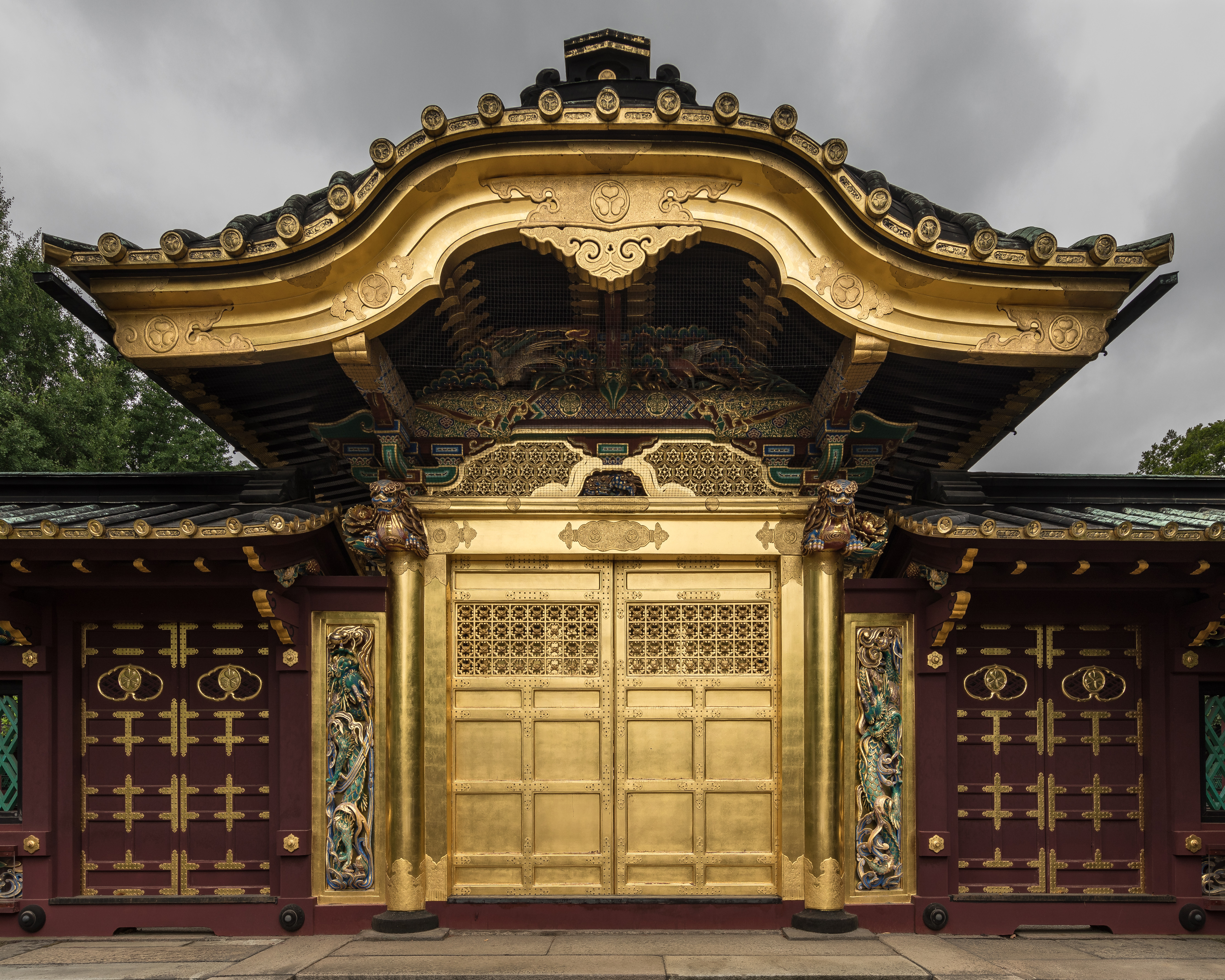
The city of Szaka and Ehir Palace were influenced by various Asian cities, and several monuments drew specifically from Buddhist and Shinto shrine designs such as this one.

Tokita's aim for the narrative was to return to his long-held principles of using games to tell a narrative only games could tell, as well as pushing narrative boundaries in terms of theme and tone. One of the things Tokita pushed for was breaking away from the convention that Square Enix role-playing games had to fit within a certain age range. While Inaba was worried, Tokita encouraged him to include far more mature or disturbing content than either Lost Sphear or I am Setsuna. The game's main motif was life and death, drawing inspiration from many Eastern philosophies that incorporated the concept of reincarnation. The team wanted players to see the story and revisit their own views on the subject. The team crafted the narrative so it would disturb people who experienced it. While the story was dark, the team wanted players to feel rather than see it, so there was no gore or graphic violence and many of the "shocking" moments are implied rather than shown. Despite the story's dark tones, the team actively worked to avoid a high age recommendation that would bar younger players. The Daemons' backstories helped communicate the narrative's somber tone. The world's faith and its related imagery drew from real-world rituals for the dead such as the Bon Festival. Following the globe-spanning adventure of Lost Sphear, Inaba wanted to write a story on a small scale similar to Vagrant Story.

During production, the two halves of the plot underwent extensive changes, including different character roles, and several planned character subplots needing to be dropped. Sara's role as the main antagonist and one of the final bosses was a later addition during the last rewrite, and the inability to explain her role until late in the game proved complicated to work around. Kagachi was designed to appear mature without being old, with his cold attitude and actions giving players incentive to find out about his personality. This played into the two halves of the game, and the central theme of the relationships between Sara and her brother. Linne was designed as a cute character players would want to protect, and while her change to an adult was quick in the final game, Hashimoto had wanted her to grow as the story progressed. Mayura was initially a throwaway character who would die at an early stage, but her design and further elaboration from Inaba led her to taking on a greater role in the narrative. To increase the feeling of connection to events, some story sections were made interactive rather than playing out as a cutscene, including Kagachi's suicide and his killing of the mob. The former scene was incorporated based on a piece of concept art with Kagachi posed with a demon, appearing as if he were stabbing himself. Each of the Daemons was inspired by and created around a specific emotion or feeling they would have had in life that caused them to linger after death. Due to the connection of the lance Daemon Zarf with the main storyline, Inaba had wanted to connect all the Daemon weapons with the narrative, but due to the complexities of this their stories were made into unlockable standalone vignettes.

In the game's Japanese release, multiple linguistic writing systems were employed, including kanji, hiragana, and katakana. This mixed use of writing styles was well received in early game concepts as certain scripts are considered more evocative and descriptive than others in Japan. This innovative approach to game writing was retained in the Japanese release. The game's Japanese title, Oni no Naku Kuni, emerged during early discussions about potential titles. A key influence was the concept of "demon", which was present from an early stage. Once the concept and title were decided, the scenario writing proceeded quickly. Its title translates directly from Japanese as "Country Where the Ogre Cries". Kagachi's name had several meanings; the word is an alternative word for the Hozuki flower used during the Bon Festival, a homonym for "snake" which is a common symbol of reincarnation, and when written a certain way included the character for "Oni". All of these tied into the game's themes.

While earlier Tokyo RPG Studio titles had used their graphics to evoke nostalgia, the team opted to use those same graphics to create an original worldview. The artistic style of the game blended Western photorealism with a stylised appearance drawn from traditional Japanese paintings. The character designs and key visuals were drawn by Japanese artist Taiki. The Daemons were designed by Yuichi Kitaoka and Yasushi Suzuki. Hashimoto credited Taiki's designs with reinforcing the unique art style of the world. A number of other artists contributed to the project. Background designer Oga Takeshi drew from several Eastern cities when creating Ehir Palace and the world's capital Szaka. Several monuments drew specifically from Buddhist and Shinto shrine designs. The game's monsters, designed by Morinaga Koji, were based on the concept of them once being normal humans. One design was based on a recurring monster type used in previous Tokyo RPG Factory games. The Japanese calligraphic logo was designed by Tomonori Kogawa, noted for his work on Space Runaway Ideon and Aura Battler Dunbine. Tokita asked for Kogawa based on his skill at brushwork. Kogawa was surprised by the request, but agreed to design the logo. While he was asked to write out words, the final product was compared by Tokita to a full illustration. Since its foundation, Tokyo RPG Factory had drawn inspiration from the Japanese phrase Setsugekka (Snow Moon Flowers) when choosing the visual themes for each planned game; I am Setsuna used snow, Lost Sphear used the moon, and for Oninaki the team used flowers as the main visual motif.

=== Music ===
The music was composed and arranged by Shunsuke Tsuchiya and Mariam Abounnasr of Procyon Studio. Both Tsuchiya and Abounnasr were notable for their work on Another Eden. Tsuchiya wrote the main theme "Oninaki" based around the game's theme of reincarnation. Abounnasr adapted the main theme several times as a leitmotif, incorporating it into the themes "Sadness" and "Kagachi", and also into battle themes. A later musical motive, used in the track "Blood Flow", had to be used with caution as it potentially spoiled a key plot detail. "Oninaki" portrayed the surface reality, while "Blood Flow" was written as an alternate main theme and symbolised its hidden truths. This contrast was compared to that between the main theme of Star Wars as the motif of the villain Darth Vader.

The area themes were difficult to write for Tsuchiya, as they only played when first entering a region and never repeated, a rare approach in RPGs. They also adopted an atmospheric musical style more common in Western games and media, watching Discovery Channel documentaries to see how the music was used to reinforce what happened on-screen. Tsuchiya wrote Linne's titular theme first around sadness, then as he got to know her better later in development incorporated hopeful elements into the piece. Sara's theme was originally going to use Linne's musical motif, but the team decided it was not working so she instead incorporated elements of "Blood Flow". A soundtrack album was released on September 11, 2019 in Japan, published by Square Enix's music label. The album won in the "Best Album — Soundtrack CD" category during Video Game Music Online's 2019 music awards.

== Release ==
The game was first announced in February 2019 for a Q2/Q3 release the same year in North America, Europe, and Japan for the Nintendo Switch, the PlayStation 4, and Microsoft Windows. The date was eventually announced as August 22; the date was first confirmed for Japan, then as its worldwide release. It was principally released as a digital exclusive, with the Japanese edition coming with several store-exclusive pre-order bonuses. A limited physical release for Switch and PS4 was also produced as a Square Enix store exclusive. While it received a CERO B rating (appropriate for ages twelve and up) in Japan due to a lack of bloody violence, other regions gave it higher ratings due to its dark themes and storyline. A complete guide was released alongside the game in Japan, including full walkthrough instructions and a short story written by Inaba which retold the game's events from the perspective of side characters. This was planned for the main scenario, but clashed with the narrative flow and so was reworked in a written story.

The simultaneous release was challenging for the team, creating a pressure that Tokita compared to the hardware limitations he had to face when Chrono Trigger and Parasite Eve were being developed. The script was localized by Alexander O. Smith and a team from his translation company Kajiya Productions. Many of the localized terms were chosen as they were the closest English parallel to the concepts, although staff felt the Japanese names may have given different impressions when directly translated. The marketing staff thought the Japanese title Oni no Naku Kuni would be too long and complex for many Western players to remember. Giving themselves a four-syllable limit, the team created the title Oninaki. A demo of the game, featuring the opening hour of its story and a mid-game dungeon area, was released in July 2019. Players could carry over their saved story progress into the main game. While the demo was released too close to the full game's launch for any substantial changes, the team did make minor adjustments based on feedback from players. These included control fixes and toning down Kagachi's vocalizations during attacks. Oninaki was the last game produced by Tokyo RPG Factory prior to its closure and absorption into Square Enix in 2024.

== Reception ==
Reception

Aggregate score
Aggregator	Score
Metacritic	NS: 68/100; PC: 72/100; PS4: 69/100

Review scores
Publication	Score
Famitsu	31/40
Game Informer	7.5/10
GameSpot	5/10
IGN	7.4/10
Nintendo Life	7/10
Nintendo World Report	8/10
The Guardian	2/5 stars
RPGFan	65%

During its first week on release in Japan, the two console versions of Oninaki reached second and third place in sales charts compiled by Japanese gaming magazine Famitsu. Its PS4 and Switch versions combined to sell nearly 27,000 copies, being the highest-selling new release that week. In its 2019-2020 fiscal report, Tokyo RPG Factory posted a significant loss compared to the previous period with the release of Lost Sphear. This loss, combined with other factors, contributed to Square Enix suffering a significant financial shortfall during that period.

Reviewers for Famitsu were generally positive, with their main complaints being complex terminology, stiff character movement, and inventory limitations. Eurogamer's Malindy Hetfeld found several concepts worth exploring, but said the game "comes across as loveless" due to other areas appearing lackluster in execution. Joe Juba, writing for Game Informer, enjoyed playing through Oninaki while citing several elements that undermined the experience for him. T.J. Hafer of IGN called Oninaki a "a gorgeous, distinctive, entertaining RPG", with his only negative views being on combat pace and the story delivery.

Heidi Kemps of GameSpot was particularly negative, focusing on the slow pace and clunky mechanics in the gameplay and a lack of energy in the narrative. By contrast, Nintendo World Report's Jordan Rudek gave it a positive review, praising the developers for their efforts and lauding its themes and mechanics despite disliking the ending and noting pacing issues. Mitch Vogel, writing for Nintendo Life, shared several opinions with Hafer and citing Oninaki as a sign of Tokyo RPG Factory's maturation in game design and quality. RPGFan's Alana Hagues was disappointed with the game overall due to its gameplay shortfalls and narrative, a feeling magnified by her wish to enjoy her time.

Journalists generally agreed that the game's dark setting and theme of how people coped with death was intriguing, but faulted the writing as either long-winded or poor. The gameplay met with a mixed response; some praised it, others found it boring, but a common complaint was a lack of variety over the course of the game. The Daemon system and its customization were praised, but many felt it lacked depth and several Daemons were underwhelming. The graphics and music, despite a few critics citing a lack of variety in the former and sparse use for the latter, were generally praised as strong points. A general consensus was that the game features strong ideas, but suffered from poor execution and a lack of polish.

From review aggregate website Metacritic, the game earned scores of 68 (23 reviews) and 69 (45 reviews) out of 100 points for its respective Switch and PS4 versions. The score for the PC version was higher, earning 72 out of 100 based on four reviews. All scores indicated a mixed or average reception. Speaking in a post-release interview, Inaba stated that player reception of the game was strong, with praise mainly focusing on its narrative and tone; reactions from Western players were mixed due to the combination of art style with its darker themes and depictions of violence. Despite mixed reviews, the game was nominated for "Game, Original Role Playing" at the NAVGTR Awards.
