= Setsugetsuka (song) =

Single
- Released: November 21, 2018
- Recorded: 2018
- Genre: Video game music
- Label: B-Green
- Songwriter: Noriyasu Agematsu
- Producer: Elements Garden

Music video
- "Setsugetsuka" on YouTube

"Setsugetsuka" (雪月花; lit. "Snow Moon Flower"; also stylized as "Setsu Getsu Ka"), released as a single titled Uta no Prince-sama Eternal Song CD "Setsugetsuka", is a song released for the mobile game Uta no Prince-sama: Shining Live. The song is performed by the characters of the game, Otoya Ittoki (voiced by Takuma Terashima), Tokiya Ichinose (voiced by Mamoru Miyano), Ren Jinguji (voiced by Junichi Suwabe), Masato Hijirikawa (voiced by Kenichi Suzumura), Natsuki Shinomiya (voiced by Kisho Taniyama), Syo Kurusu (voiced by Hiro Shimono), Cecil Aijima (voiced by Kohsuke Toriumi), Reiji Kotobuki (voiced by Showtaro Morikubo), Ai Mikaze (voiced by Shouta Aoi), Ranmaru Kurosaki (voiced by Tatsuhisa Suzuki), and Camus (voiced by Tomoaki Maeno). The song was released on November 21, 2018.

== Background ==
"Setsugetsuka" is a song released for the mobile game Uta no Prince-sama: Shining Live. The song is performed by the characters of the game, Otoya Ittoki (voiced by Takuma Terashima), Tokiya Ichinose (voiced by Mamoru Miyano), Ren Jinguji (voiced by Junichi Suwabe), Masato Hijirikawa (voiced by Kenichi Suzumura), Natsuki Shinomiya (voiced by Kisho Taniyama, Syo Kurusu (voiced by Hiro Shimono), Cecil Aijima (voiced by Kohsuke Toriumi), Reiji Kotobuki (voiced by Showtaro Morikubo), Ai Mikaze (voiced by Shouta Aoi), Ranmaru Kurosaki (voiced by Tatsuhisa Suzuki), and Camus (voiced by Tomoaki Maeno). The song was produced by Elements Garden and was described as a Japanese-style love-ballad.

The song was released on November 21, 2018 under the label B-Green through a single titled Uta no Prince-sama Eternal Song CD "Setsugetsuka". The single was physically released in three different versions corresponding to the theme of the song: Snow, Moon, and Flower. Each of the three versions had alternate packaging and included a DVD containing the original size version of the music video. The first press edition came with a random message card from one of the characters featured on the cover depending on the version.

== Music video ==
The music video was animated by Otome Gakuen Illust. Panda Graphics. The choreography was by Kazuya Tachibanaki. The music video shows the characters wearing the collaboration outfits designed by Keita Maruyama that were featured in an anniversary event titled Uta no Prince-sama: Setsu Getsu Ka Eternal Moment, which was held in September 2018.

== Reception ==
The single ranked #3 on the Oricon Weekly Singles Chart. "Setsugetsuka" was ranked #4 on Billboard Japan Hot 100 and #1 on Billboard Japan Hot Animation. The "Flower" version of the single was also ranked #20 on Tower Records' Weekly Chart. By the end of 2018, the single sold over 72,345 physical copies and was one of the top best-selling anime singles of the year.

CD Journal described "Setsugetsuka" as "impressive" with a Japanese-style scale, noting that each character's individuality is expressed during his solo part.

== Track listing ==
All tracks are written by Elements Garden.

No.	Title	Lyrics	Music	Arrangement	Length
1.	"Setsugetsuka" (雪月花 lit. Snow Moon Flower)	Noriyasu Agematsu	Noriyasu Agematsu	Hitoshi Fujima	4:33
2.	"Setsugetsuka" (off vocal)	—	Noriyasu Agematsu	Hitoshi Fujima	4:30
Total length:					9:03

== Charts ==
Chart (2018)	Peak position
Billboard Japan Hot 100	4
Billboard Japan Hot Animation	1
Oricon Weekly Singles Chart	3
