= Lost Sphear =

2017 video game

- Developer: Tokyo RPG Factory
- Publisher: Square Enix
- Director: Atsushi Hashimoto
- Programmer: Tomoyuki Kurino
- Artists: Jun Suzuki; Mari Yorumachi
- Writers: Hirotaka Inaba; Makoto Goya
- Composer: Tomoki Miyoshi
- Engine: Unity
- Platforms: Nintendo Switch; PlayStation 4; Windows
- Release: JP: October 12, 2017; WW: January 23, 2018
- Genre: Role-playing
- Mode: Single-player

Lost Sphear (Note: Japanese: ロストスフィア, Hepburn: Rosuto Sufia) is a role-playing video game developed by Tokyo RPG Factory and published by Square Enix for Nintendo Switch, PlayStation 4 and Windows. It was released in Japan in 2017, and worldwide in 2018. Set in a world where the Moon is treated as a deity, the player takes on the role of Kanata, who is granted the power to prevent the world from vanishing. The gameplay has Kanata and his party exploring different regions of the world to restore vanished zones, with combat making use of a version of the Active Time Battle system.

The game began development after the release of I am Setsuna (2016), with multiple returning staff including director Atsushi Hashimoto, writers Hirotaka Inaba and Makoto Goya, and composer Tomoki Miyoshi. The team's aim was to refine the earlier title's mechanics, while creating a new setting and story themed around memories. The game met with low sales, and critical reception was mixed. Praise went to its battle system and music, but faulted its storyline and a lack of originality.

== Gameplay ==
An early combat encounter in Lost Sphear

Lost Sphear is a role-playing video game in which players take on the role of protagonist Kanata and a growing party of companions. Players explore between non-hostile towns, a semi-open world map, and dungeon environments featuring enemy encounters; they complete both main story quests and side quests given by characters in town areas. The main goal of the game is for Kanata to restore parts of the world that are fading away. Restoring areas and landmarks is done with items representing the memories of a place. Some areas called Monuments can have their properties changed using different memories, which impacts factors such as movement speed and gains of experience points, ingredients for cooking, and in-game currency. Items and equipment can be found while exploring, or bought from shops in towns.

While exploring dungeons, enemy encounters are represented as visible monsters the player can avoid, and items and treasure chests are scattered around an area. Some areas include a puzzle. Combat, triggered by running into enemies, uses a version of the Active Time Battle system; characters will attack when a meter fills in real-time, though an option pauses the timer while players are selecting skills. Characters can attack normally, or use special moves from items called Spritnite. A timed button press strengthens the attack through a "Momentum" system, while a secondary "Sublimation" system builds up passive effects on the party during battle.

Characters can also reposition themselves, with attacks and skills having an area of effect. Multiple active characters can also activate a united attack move. After a certain point in the game, the party can use mechs called Vulcosuits, which have access to their own sets of skills and require their own fuel to operate which can only be recharged at specific points. Items gained at the end of combat can be influenced by how enemies were killed. Character statistics can be shifted using their equipment, and new moves can be unlocked for characters by equipping Spritnite stones and paired with other moves to unlock new effects.

== Synopsis ==
Lost Sphear takes place on an unnamed world where its Moon is treated as its creator. The opening scene shows Oboro, a king of the ancient Plated People, watching his soldiers and world vanishing into nothing. An unspecified time later, the young Kanata, together with his friends Lumina and Locke, explore the land outside their village Elgarthe, encountering a rise in monsters. Returning to Elgarthe, they find it transformed into a white void called "Lost". Using the memories of prayers from the villagers to a local alter, Kanata unlocks a power to restore the town, and upon learning that other parts of the world are also becoming Lost, he resolves to save the Lost using his powers. He is initially employed by the powerful Gigante Empire, but upon learning their lack of ethical methods and the fact that their actions are worsening the problem, he defects and sets out on his own.

During his journey, Kanata's group is joined by Van, crown prince of a kingdom that became Lost; Oboro, whom Kanata rescues from being Lost; Shera, lead warrior of a tribe who oppose the Empire's exploitation of their land; Dianto, a sentient monster born from a village's prayers; and Galdra, female Commander of the Imperial forces who defects with Kanata's encouragement. During an early mission for the Empire, Locke is severely injured, and is secretly turned into a mechanical soldier who initially fights the party before regaining his memories and rejoining them. Van briefly betrays the group after Kanata fails to restore his kingdom, but is in turn betrayed by his former ally Krom, a man with strange powers who has been influencing the Empire's actions. It is revealed that the Moon is a techno-magical system which is striving to create a world free of conflict, repeatedly destroying and recreating it. During an earlier cycle, Krom helped steal the Moon's power and merged with it in an attempt to recreate a world free of its influence. The current crisis is Krom beginning his attempt.

After initially defeating Krom, the group are forced into a version of Elgarthe in the realm of Lost. There they learn that Kanata and Lumina were born directly from the Moon, able to harness its powers. Returning to the world, the group rally their allies and discover a way to reach the Moon and defeat Krom, who has permanently merged with the Moon. With Krom's defeat, the Moon begins to disintegrate, and after the others flee, Kanata and Lumina unsuccessfully attempt to restore it. Lumina decides to sacrifice herself by returning to the Moon. Kanata can choose to either allow this, or use his powers to rescue her. If Lumina sacrifices herself, the Moon is restored and Kanata finishes restoring the world to create a future ruled by humans. If Kanata saves Lumina, the Moon's destruction is halted, but the Lost remain a threat and Kanata resolves to continue restoring the world despite hopeless odds. The game ends with a shot of the cast, including Lumina depending on the final choice, gazing up at the completed Moon shining on an intact landscape.

== Development ==
Lost Sphear was developed by Tokyo RPG Factory as one of three concept titles created following its founding as a subsidiary of Square Enix; the studio's goal was creating homages to titles from the "golden age" of RPGs in the 1990s. The first talks about Lost Sphear began following the release of I am Setsuna (2016), with production running parallel to the earlier game's Nintendo Switch port. Among the returning staff were director Atsushi Hashimoto, art director Jun Suzuki, and scenario writers Hirotaka Inaba and Makoto Goya. The characters were designed by Mari Yorumachi. While their production process was unchanged, the team's experience developing I am Setsuna allowed them to work more smoothly, increasing the game's content. The game was built using the Unity game engine.

As with I am Setsuna, the team used a version of the Active Time Battle system−dubbed "ATB 2.0"−inspired by the combat system of Chrono Trigger. The team used player feedback from I am Setsuna to improve and expand their design, including in-battle movement and incorporating the Vulcosuit mechanics. They also incorporated new elements such as directional attack bonuses and memory artifacts, with Hashimoto wanting the game to stand out within the genre rather than simply be about nostalgia. Party talk, interactions between the cast members, was added to provide more depth and interaction compared to I Am Setsuna.

From its foundation, Tokyo RPG Factory had drawn inspiration from the Japanese phrase setsugekka (Snow, Moon and Flowers) when choosing the visual themes for each planned game; Lost Sphear used the theme of moon. The game world's moon featured heavily in promotional artwork, and several in-game environments were inspired by it. While carrying over some in-game terminology, Hashimoto stated the game was not related to I am Setsuna, but instead a standalone story exploring similar themes. A similar sombre tone was wanted to I am Setsuna, so the game drew direct inspiration from the Japanese phrase "hakanai", meaning "fleeting". During the early drafting stage, the team selected "memory" as a key word for the story and game design, building both around that and its implications. Hashimoto later described creating the scenario as like "all-out war", with one person writing the draft, a team of event planners translating it into the game, and himself checking it for consistency. The game's art style was described as emulating hand-drawn art, something seen as a growing rarity in games at the time.

=== Music ===
Tomoki Miyoshi, who had composed the music of I am Setsuna, returned to create the soundtrack. As with I am Setsuna, the team wanted a piano-heavy soundtrack, but with more musical variety due to the greater diversity of locations and environments. The piano was performed by Kumiko Ito, and the violin by Hiroaki Yura. John Kurlander handled mixing, while Daniel Brown led mastering and sound balance. The soundtrack's core theme was memory. Miyoshi described himself as feeling honored at the positive responses to his work and committed to putting further effort into his new work. He was approached about Lost Sphear a few months after the international release of I am Setsuna, deciding to use chamber orchestral music as inspiration. In preparation he studied the work of Ludwig van Beethoven, Johann Sebastian Bach, Sergei Prokofiev, and Béla Bartók. The music was inspired by many elements, including a recent interest in scientific concepts of time and space, and quantum mechanics. The central theme "Echoes of the Heart" was written in a short period after reading and being impressed by the Heart Sutra. A two-disc official soundtrack album was released on November 22, 2017.

== Release ==
Lost Sphear was announced in May 2017 for Switch, PlayStation 4 and Windows. The game's title, which used an archaic spelling of the word "sphere", was decided upon early and eventually tied into the game's narrative. A demo was released in Japan, covering the opening section of the game. It released in Japan physically and digitally on October 12, 2017. It was supplemented with downloadable content focusing on an arena and boss rush mode. A guidebook, covering both walkthrough tips and developer illustrations and interviews, released on October 26.

An English demo, covering a different section of the game, was released in December 2017. The game released in North America and Europe on January 23, 2018, with the physical PS4 and Switch versions being exclusive to Square Enix's online store. An arrange album, Forgotten Memories, was released alongside the game's Windows release. A day one patch allowed players access to the additional content.

== Reception ==
Reception

Aggregate score
| Aggregator | Score |
|---|---|
| Metacritic | NS: 69/100; PC: 69/100; PS4: 68/100 |

Review scores
| Publication | Score |
|---|---|
| Famitsu | 32/40 |
| Game Informer | 6.5/10 |
| GameSpot | 6/10 |
| IGN | 6.7/10 |
| Nintendo Life | 8/10 |
| PC Gamer (US) | 62/100 |
| Polygon | 6/10 |
| RPGFan | 72% |

Initial Japanese sales for Lost Sphear were notably lower than its predecessor I am Setsuna; the game sold over 7,000 copies on PS4, and over 5,500 on Switch. Dengeki stated that the game sold through about 20% of its initial shipment, indicating that Square Enix expected higher sales. During its fiscal year ending March 2018, Square Enix stated Tokyo RPG Factory had achieved a profit of ¥83 million, down over 60% from their profits the previous year following the release of I am Setsuna.

The four reviewers for Japanese gaming magazine Famitsu were generally positive about its homages to earlier titles and its improvements over I am Setsuna. Mitch Vogel of Nintendo Life, while noting a large number of derivative elements in its design, called Lost Sphear "an engaging world, deep battle system, and plenty of replayability which will likely delight many an RPG fan." RPGFan's Rob Rogan summed Lost Sphear up as "an unremarkable yet pleasant JRPG experience", feeling that the studio had potential to further refine the systems they had built on and introduced in the game. Eurogamer's Simon Parkin noted some interesting and innovative mechanics, but otherwise felt a larger team and budget had caused harmful bloat in the game's design.

Game Informer's Kimberley Wallace praised the improvements to the combat from I am Setsuna, but stated that "everything else falls short and feels dull." James O'Connor of GameSpot praised the depth of the combat system and the later parts of the story, but faulted much of the rest of the game for pacing issues and filler tasks. Jeremy Parish, writing for IGN, enjoyed the story's premise and pace despite his other complaints and found the most enjoyment in its gameplay customization. Polygon's Janine Hawkins found the gameplay systems engaging despite some pacing issues, but was very negative about the amount of in-universe language she had to memorize. Leif Johnson of PC Gamer found the combat to be the one enjoyable part of his experience, with the rest of the game's systems and design feeling either shallow or needlessly complex.

From review aggregate website Metacritic, the game earned scores of 69 (Switch, PC) and 68 (PS4) out of 100 points, indicating a "mixed or average" reception. A recurring point raised by reviewers was a large number of elements borrowed from earlier RPG titles or other pieces of media, which several critics faulted as a lack of originality. Opinions on the narrative were mixed; while both Parish and Vogel praised its pacing, others found it slow, and several reviewers noted a lack of originality. The battle system met with general praise as an improvement over the game's predecessor, though several reviewers criticized unfair difficulty spikes with the game's bosses. The visual design was often faulted due to its muted palette and lack of original designs despite the greater environmental variety compared to I am Setsuna. By contrast the music met with praise when mentioned, though Wallace found it became repetitive with time.
