= Snow, moon and flowers =

Common theme in Japanese art

Snow, Moon and Flowers (雪月花, setsu-getsu-ka or setsu gekka) is a Japanese expression and theme in art and design originating from a poem by Tang dynasty poet Bai Juyi. It became popular in the late Edo period. It is a Japanese metonym for beautiful sceneries in nature.

== Introduction ==
This threefold theme usually refers to the seasons of the year: snow refers to winter, moon refers to autumn and flowers refers to spring. But one could also think of it as representations of three whites: blue-white refers to winter, yellow-white refers to autumn and pink-white refers to spring.

Ukiyo-e artists liked to sell prints in series, sometimes even scrolls were painted to be hanged together. Artists liked to combine it with three women, three well known landscapes (moon always with reflecting water) etc.

"Snow, Moon and flowers" appear also as decoration on boxes, backside of traditional mirrors etc.

Katsukawa Shunshō (1726–1793)	Sakai Hōitsu (1761–1828)
from left to right: --- Sei Shōnagon (winter) ------- Murasaki Shikibu (autumn) ------------ Ono no Komachi (spring)	Snow Moon Flowers

- Prints by Shiba Kōkan, signed as Suzuki Harushige (1747–1818)
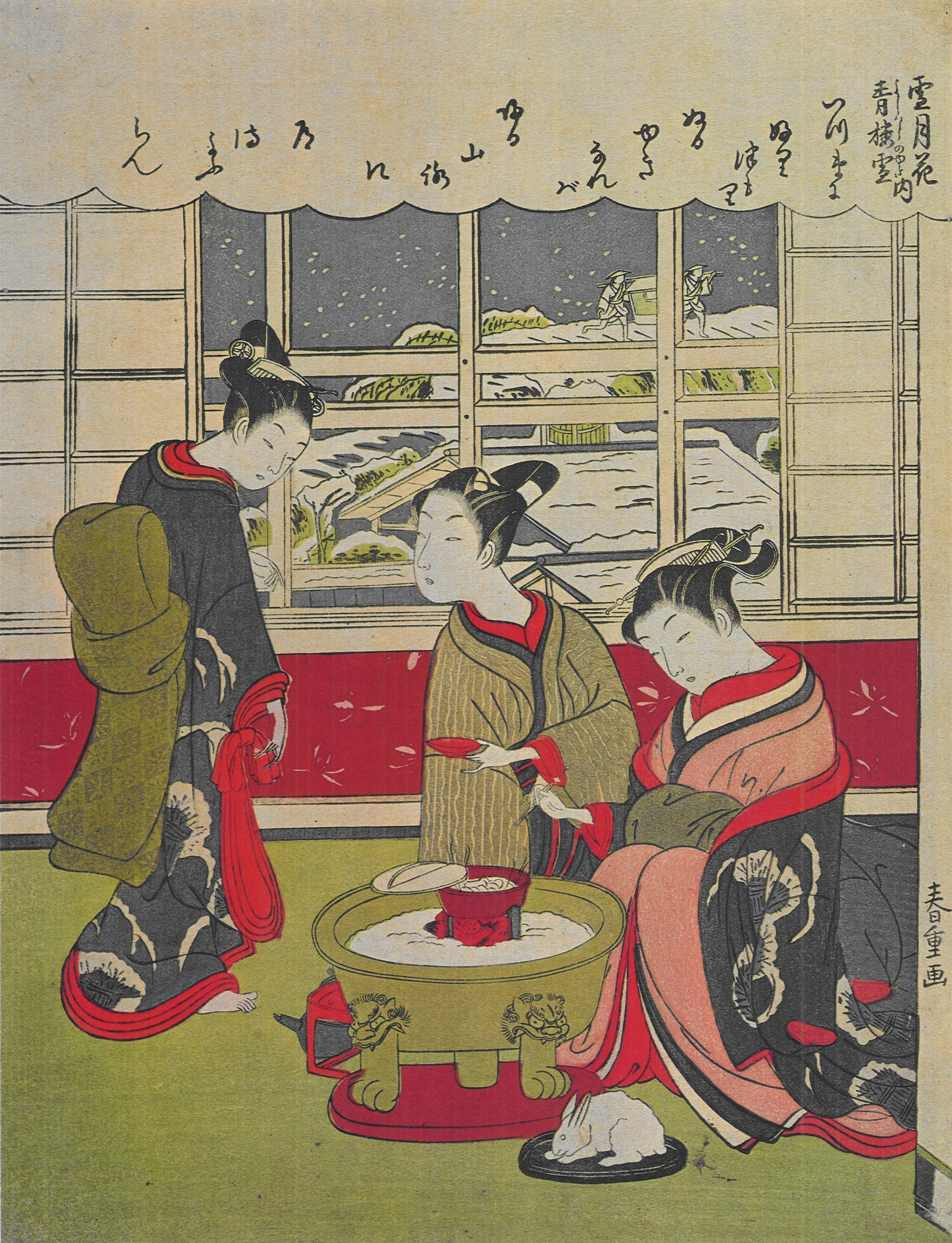
Winter at Yoshiwara

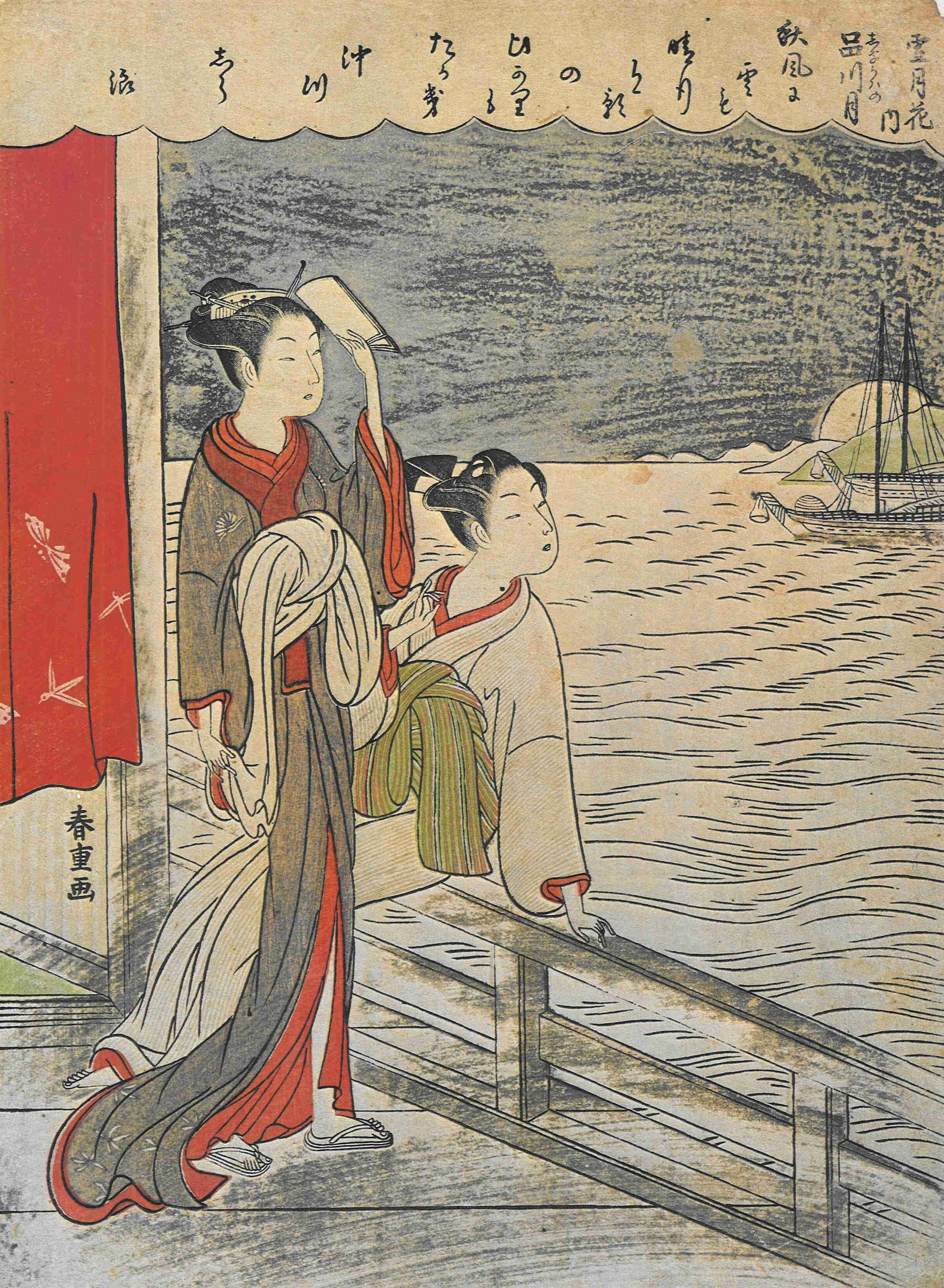
Moon above Shinagawa

Spring (yet missing)
- Prints by Hokusai Katsushika (1760–1849)
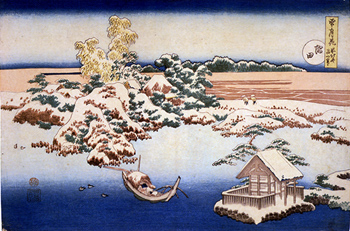
Snow at Sumidagawa
(at Edo)

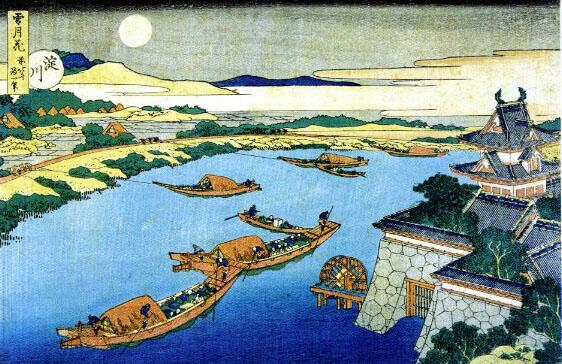
Moon above Yodogawa
(in Kansai)

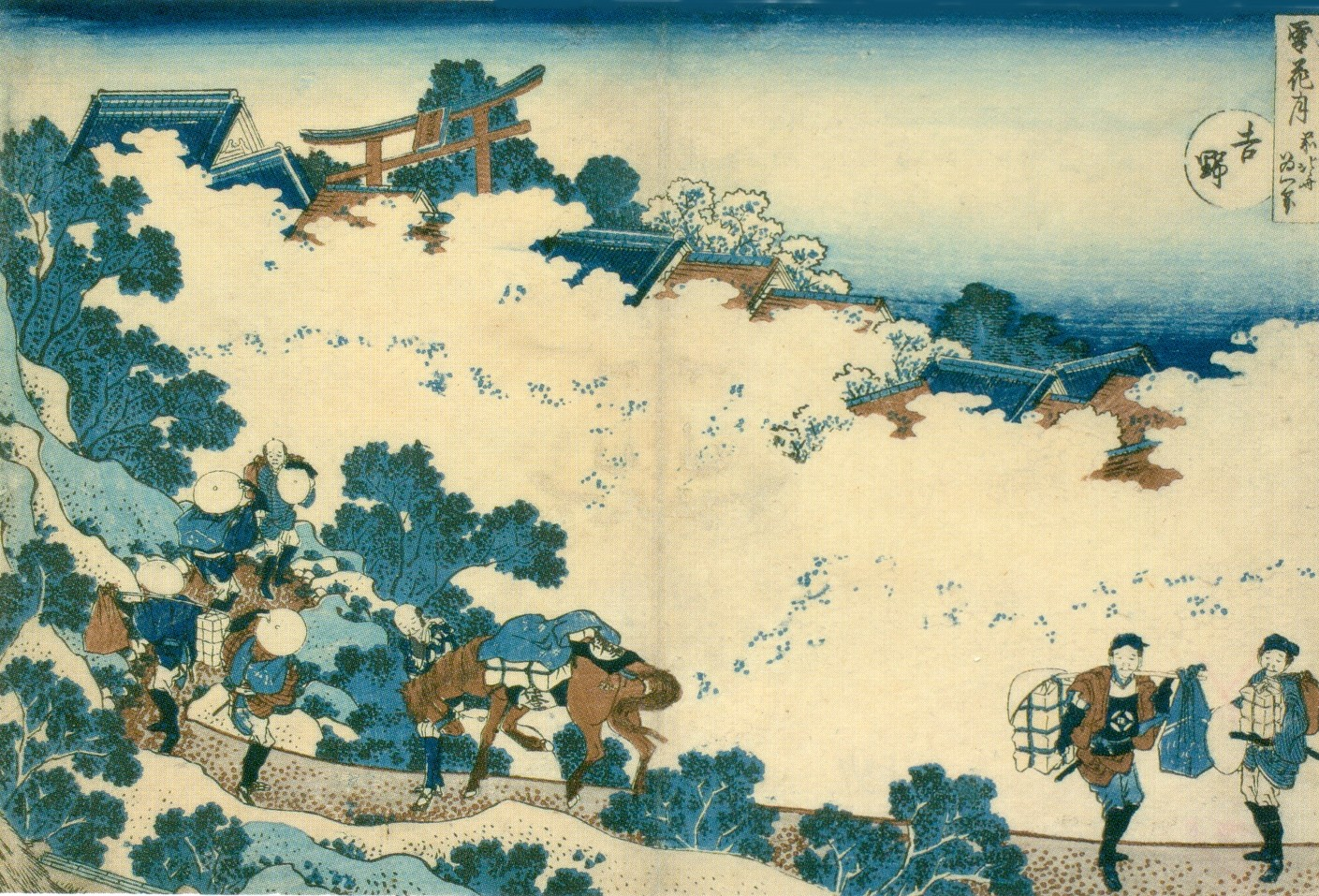
Flowers at Yoshino
(in Nara Pref.)

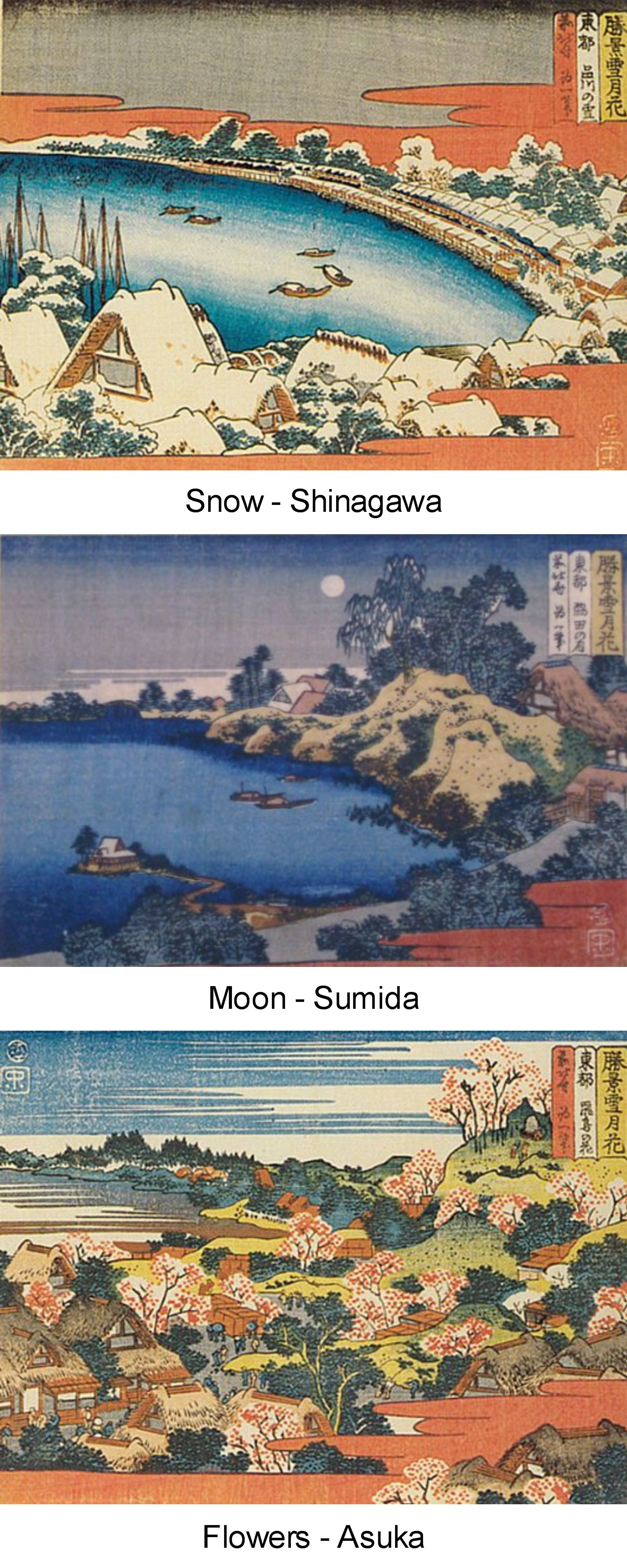
Snow, Moon and flowers at Tōto (around Edo)

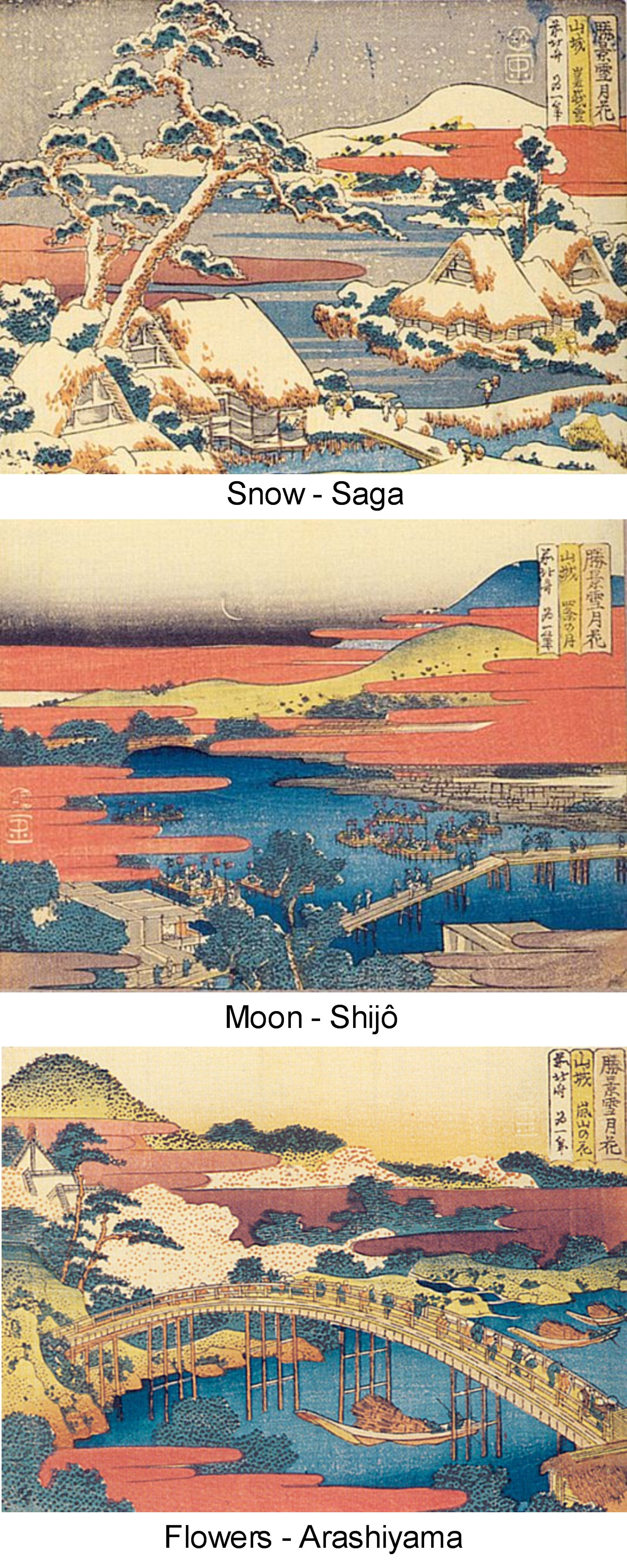
Snow, Moon and flowers at Yamashiro (around Kyōto)

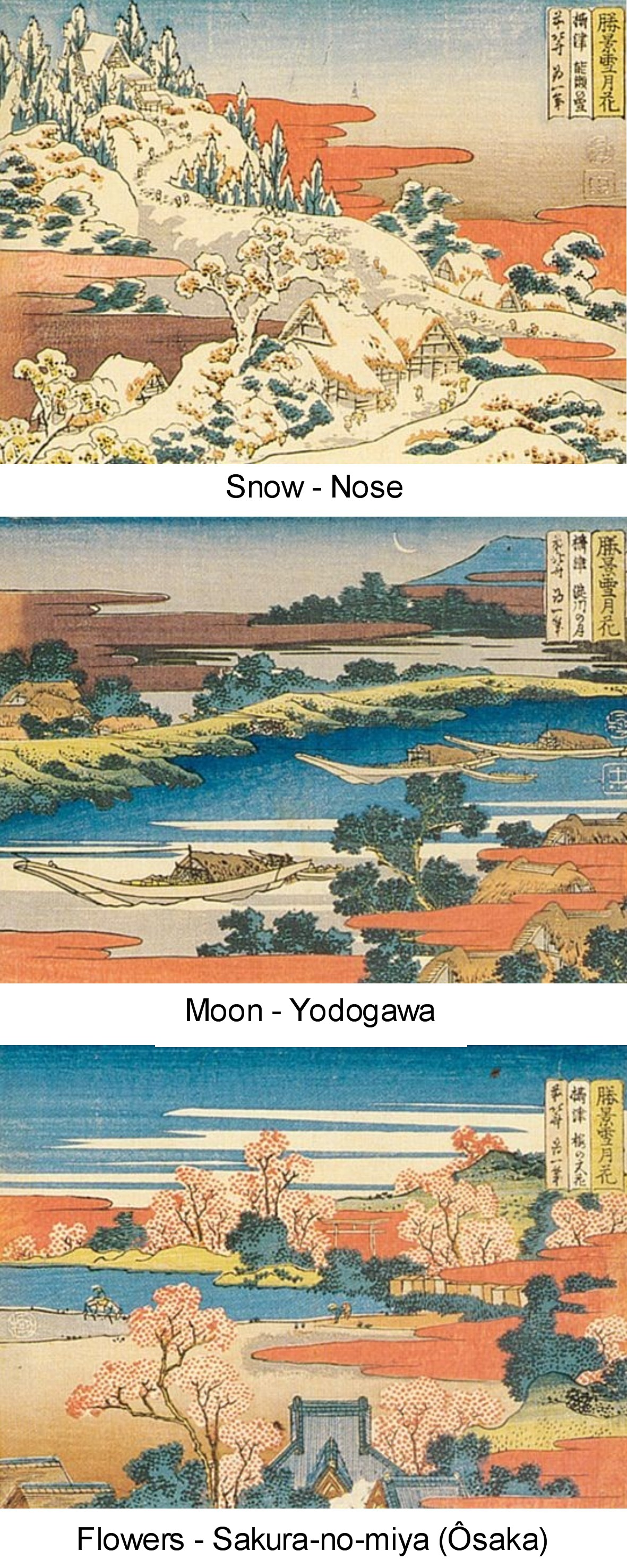
Snow, Moon and flowers at Settsu (around Ōsaka)
- Prints by Utagawa Kunisada (1786–1865)
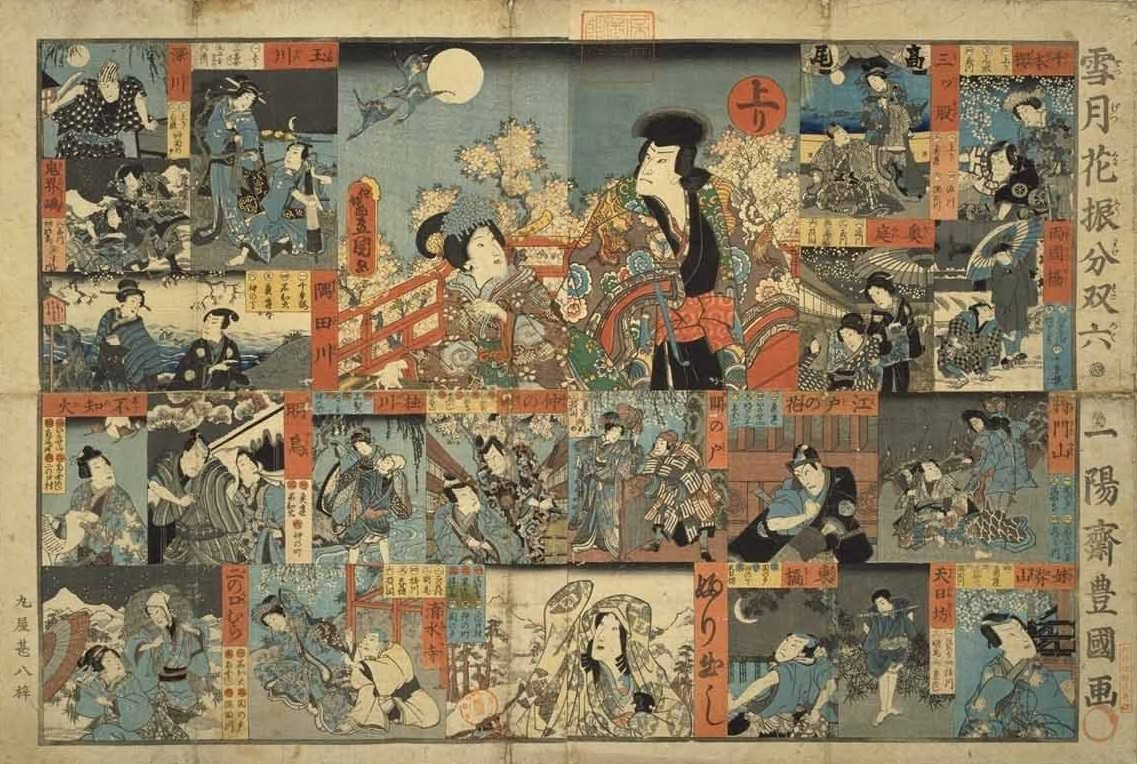
Snow, Moon and flowers as Sugoroku game
- Prints by Utagawa Kuniyoshi (1797–1861)
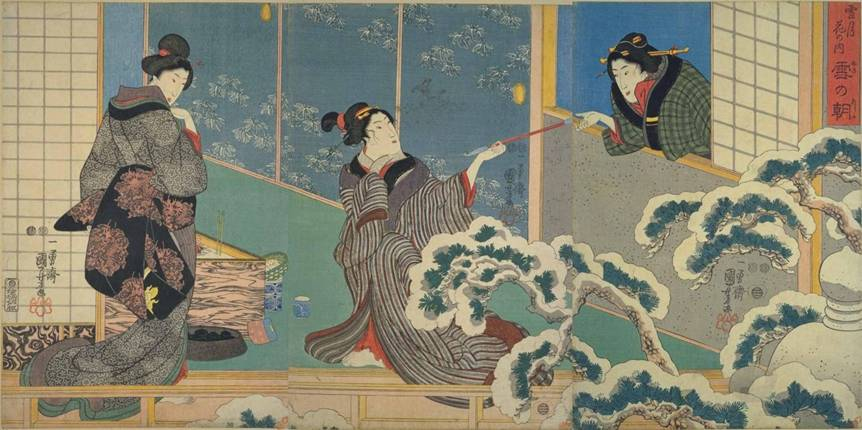
Snow in the morning

Moon (yet missing)

Flowers (yet missing)
- Prints by Utagawa Hiroshige (1797–1858)
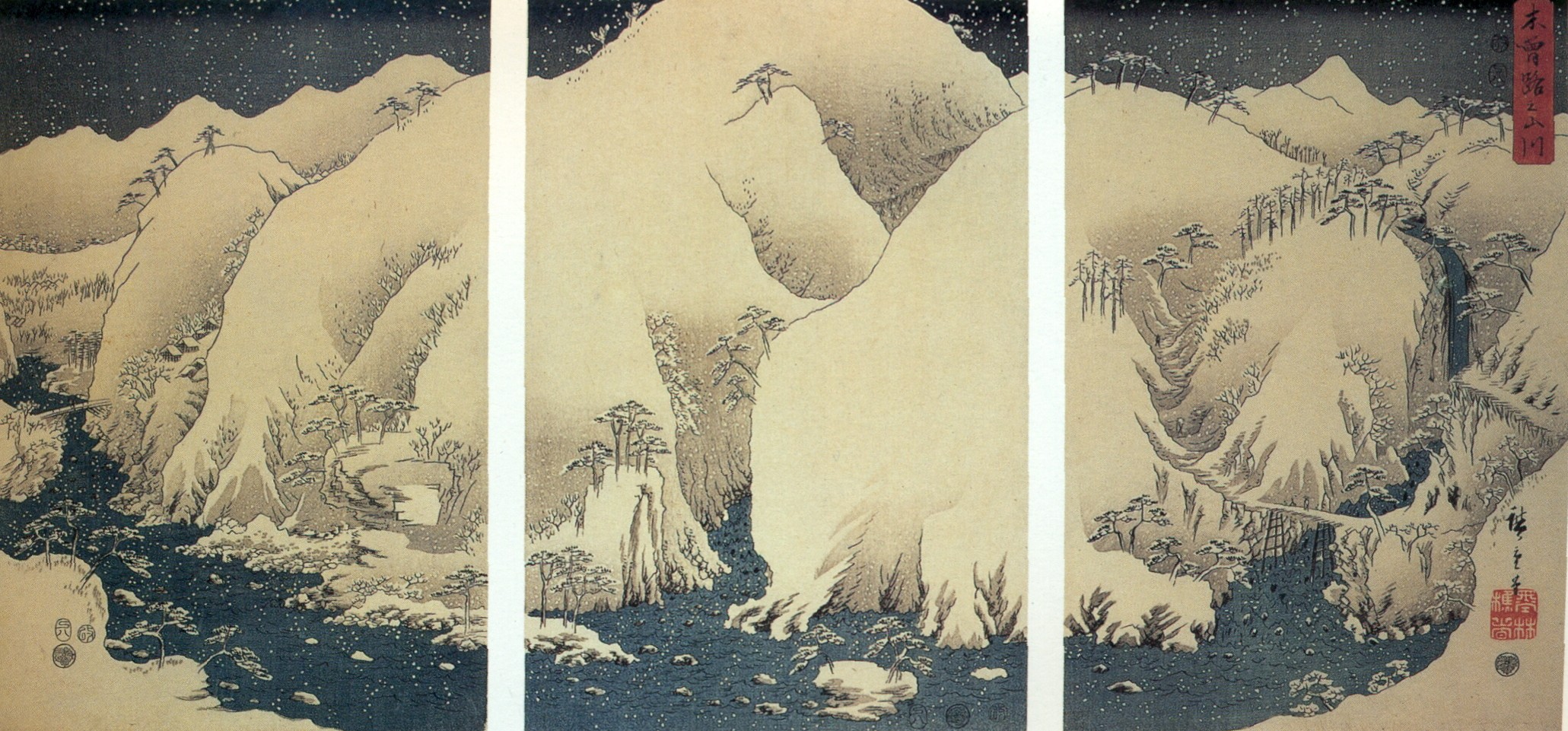
Snow at the Kiso road

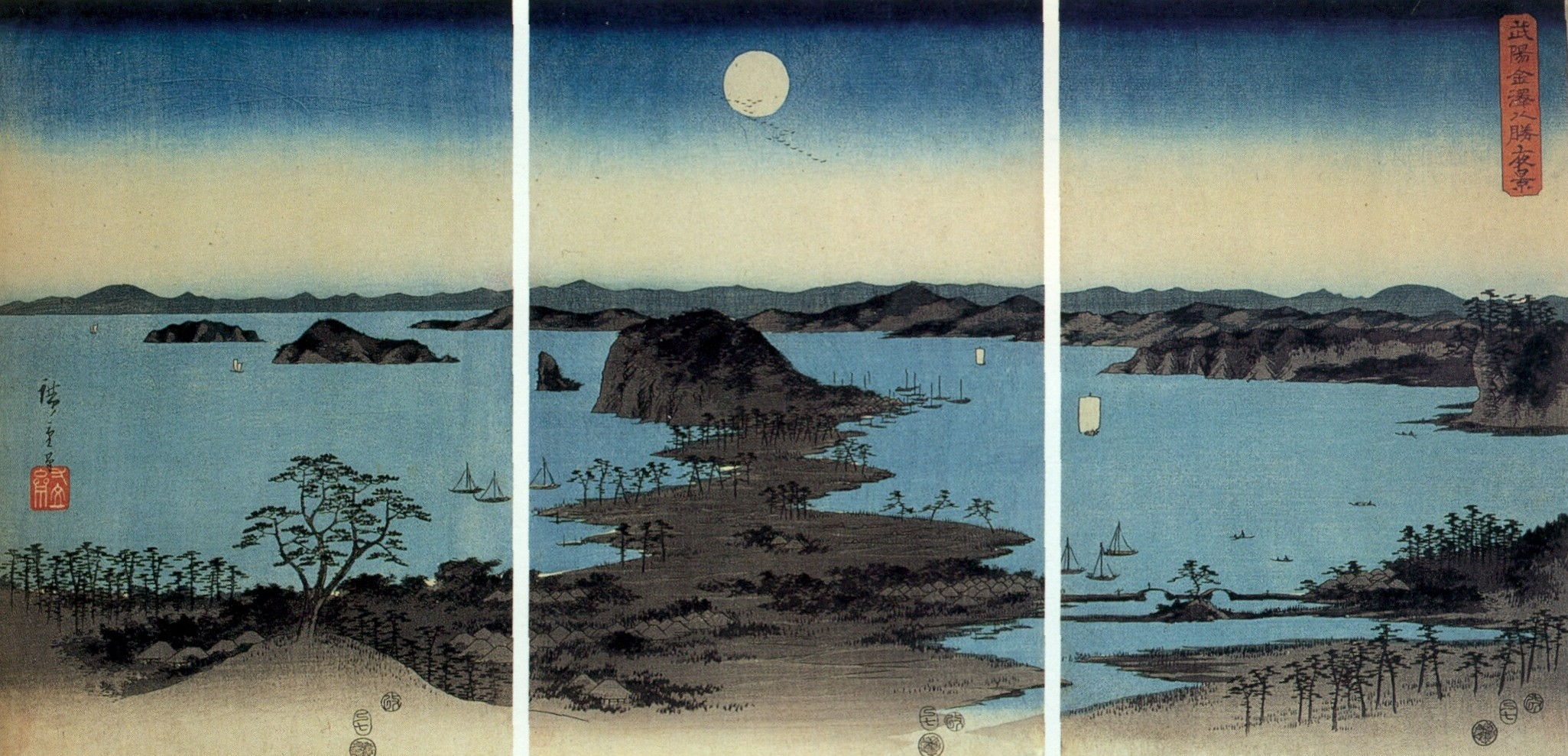
Moon above Kanazawa (Kanagawa Pref.)

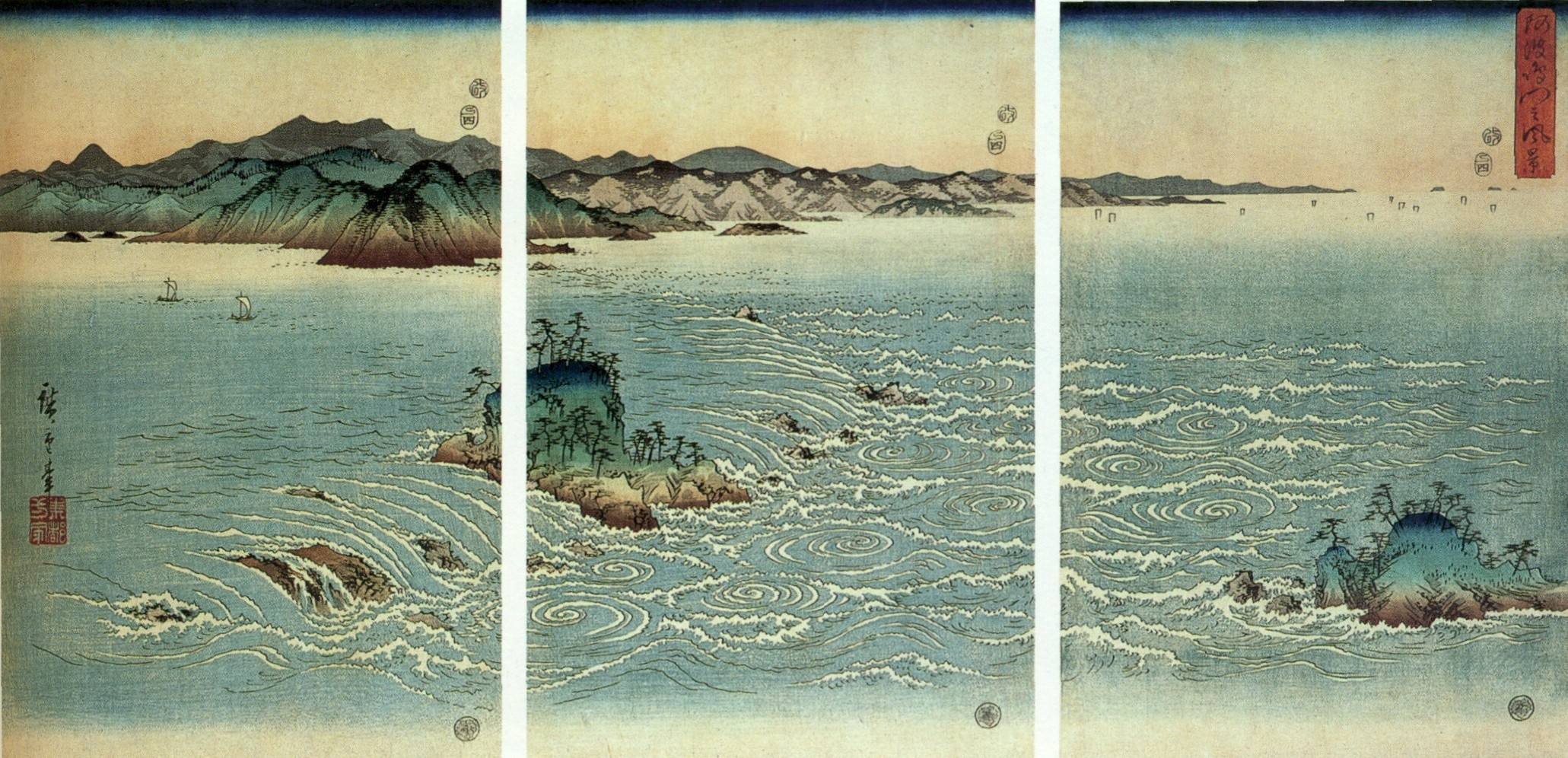
Flowers at Naruto

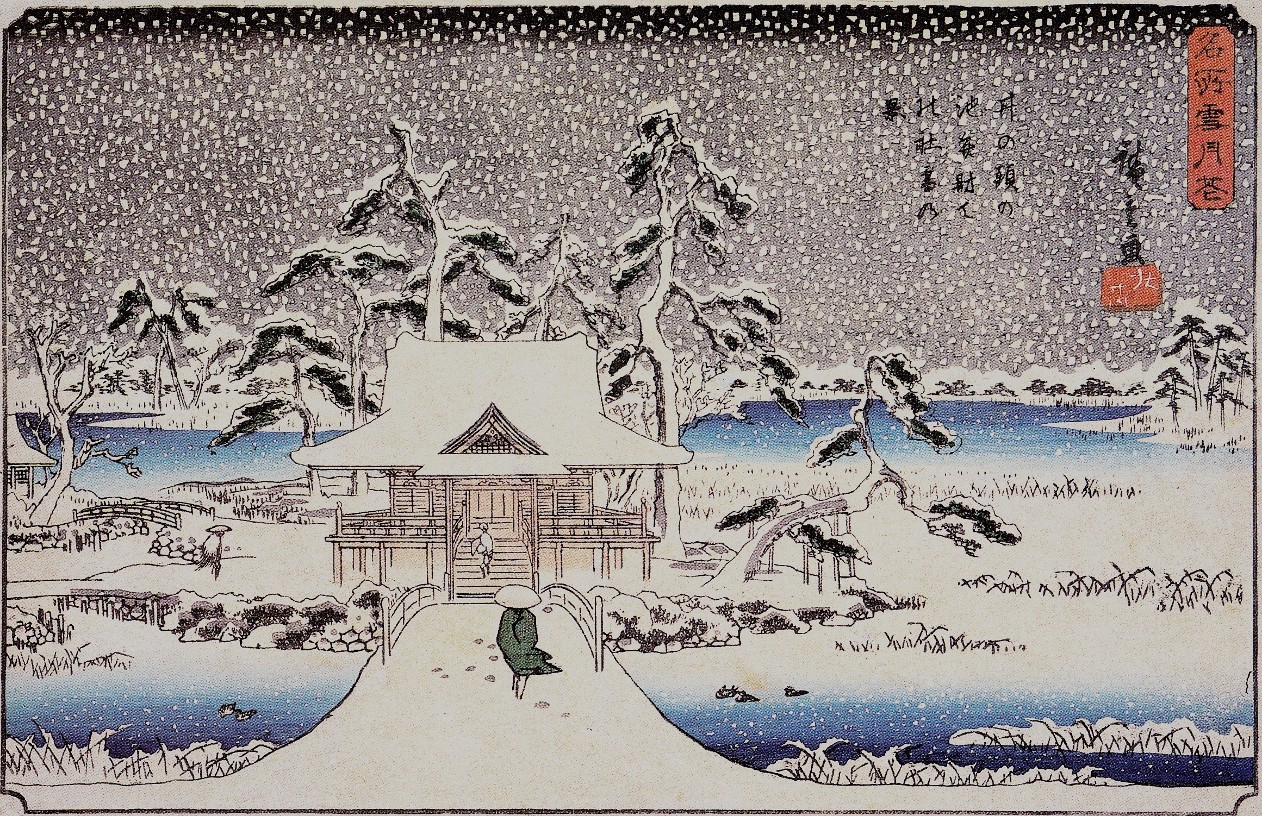
Meisho Snow (Inokashira))

Moon (yet missing)

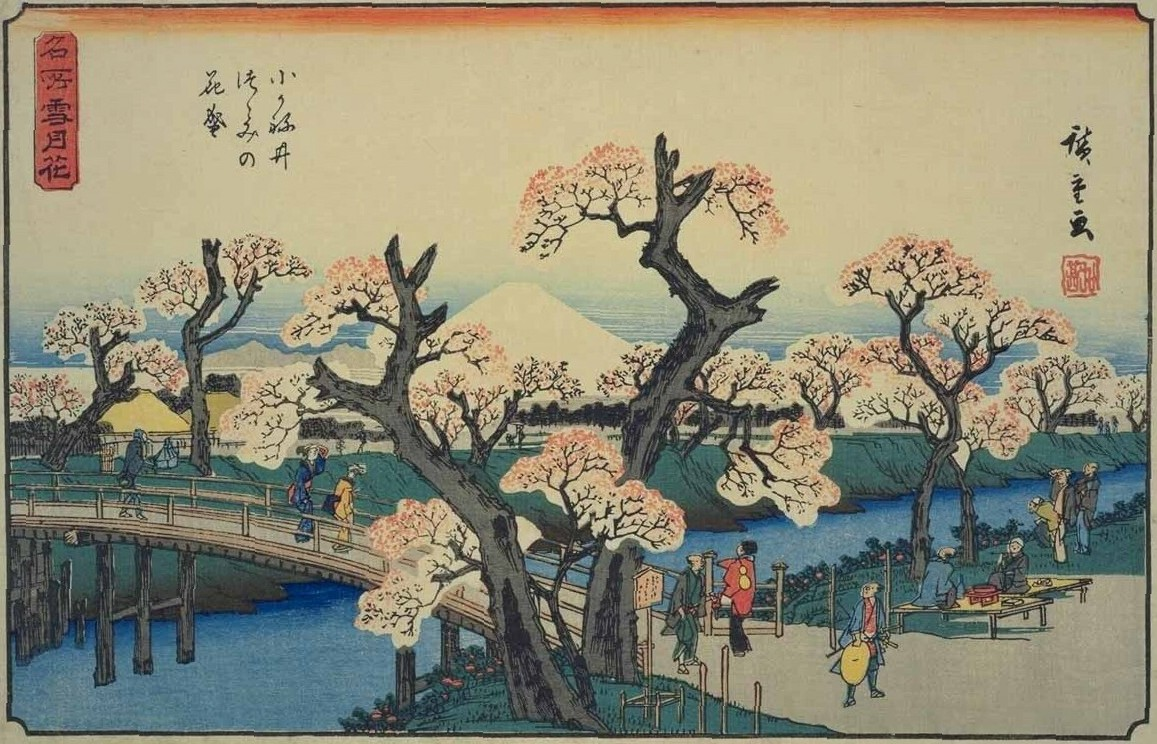
Meisho Flowers (Koganei)

== In popular culture ==
=== Literature ===
- In the Unbreakable Machine-Doll light novel, the Setsugetsuka Trilogy is composed of three female automaton sisters; Irori, the eldest sister, representing the snow, Yaya, the second eldest sister, representing the moon, and Komurasaki, the youngest sister, representing the flower.

=== Comics ===
- In the Unbreakable Machine-Doll manga, the Setsugetsuka Trilogy is composed of three female automaton sisters; Irori, the eldest sister, representing the snow, Yaya, the second eldest sister, representing the moon, and Komurasaki, the youngest sister, representing the flower.

=== Video games ===
- In the Yakuza series, there exists an enka song called Kamuro Setsugekka (神室雪月花), often localized as Kamurocho Lullaby, which talks about the Snow, Moon and Flowers in Kamurochō, one of the main locations in the franchise. The song first appears in Yakuza 2, as sung by a singer called Chikamatsu in the mission The Enka Life. In Yakuza 3, Yakuza 4, Yakuza 5 and the spin-off game Yakuza: Dead Souls, the protagonist Kazuma Kiryu can sing Kamurocho Lullaby in the karaoke minigame. The song also appears as background music in restaurants and other locations in multiple games, including Yakuza 0, and in Yakuza 4, Daisaku Minami sings it before his battle with Shun Akiyama.
- The Japanese title of Fire Emblem: Three Houses is in reference to the theme, as the player spends a full year teaching at the Officer's Academy.
- The MMORPG Final Fantasy XIV's samurai class is based around the three seals of Snow, Moon and Flowers. With the three, the player may execute an attack named Midare Setsugekka.
- The Tokyo RPG Factory games I am Setsuna, Lost Sphear and Oninaki are each themed after a component of this phrase.
- In 2018 there was a Collaboration for the mobile game Uta no☆Prince-sama♪ Shining Live: Uta no☆Prince-sama♪ Eternal Song CD "Setsugekka" song collaboration featuring the 11 idols in units Yuki, Tsuki, & Hana. A music video for the song "Setsugetsuka" was also released.

=== Radio, animation, and television ===
- In the Unbreakable Machine-Doll anime, the Setsugetsuka Trilogy is composed of three female automaton sisters; Irori, the eldest sister, representing the snow, Yaya, the second eldest sister, representing the moon, and Komurasaki, the youngest sister, representing the flower.
- In the anime Joran: The Princess of Snow and Blood three of the main characters are named Yuki, Hana, and Tsuki (Japanese for "snow", "flower", and "moon" respectively). The same goes for the manga/anime Kare Kano: the protagonist is called Yukino, while her two younger sisters are called Kano (where ‘ka’ is written with the kanji for ‘flower’) and Tsukino.
