= Active Time Battle =

Role-playing video game mechanic

A battle in Final Fantasy VI, showing ATB bars on the lower-right

Active Time Battle (ATB) is a role-playing video game mechanic invented by Hiroyuki Ito. It was first used in Final Fantasy IV (1991), and patented in 1995 by Ito and Hironobu Sakaguchi, though the patent expired in 2010, allowing it to be used in any game. It replaced turn-based gameplay with a system of timers, allowing both protagonists and enemies to attack at their own pace, even while navigating menus. Different types of techniques caused the timer to move at different rates until the character could move again. The system's success led to it being used in most subsequent mainline menu-based Final Fantasy games, up until the series eventually abandoned menu-based gameplay in favor of action role-playing gameplay for mainline titles. Active Time Battle has been noted by critics as a revolutionary step in the genre as well as a defining aspect of the series' Super Nintendo and PlayStation era games and of Final Fantasy as a whole.

== Mechanics ==
In an ATB system, each character and enemy has their own "internal clock", distinct from previous turn-based systems that proceeded in alternating turns of player, then enemy. This is usually determined by the character's initiative, or speed, stat. The clocks proceed in an independent fashion, though they can be sped up using magic like Haste. In Action mode, even menus do not stop the ATB bars, allowing characters to be attacked and die while choosing an action. Additionally, actions may take longer or shorter depending on how powerful they are. Being attacked while preparing to cast a spell, for example, would cancel the spell outright.

== Development ==
Active Time Battle mechanics were initially created out of a desire to add additional realism to games, with the patent stating that typical turn-based games were "static". In an interview, designer Takashi Tokita stated that the initial version of Active Time Battle simply had characters attacking based on who had the fastest speed. He claimed that Ito came up with the idea for the final version of Active Time Battle while watching Formula One racing, in which some cars were behind on laps. This gave him the idea that fast characters could attack more than once per turn.

The system was first used in Final Fantasy IV, one of the first games with preset character names, classes and biographies, reflecting the newly expanded storytelling within the game. It continued to be used until Final Fantasy X in 2001, which represented a "fresh start" for the series as its first PlayStation 2 game. Battle system director Toshiro Tsuchida decided to remove the ATB system entirely, making the game strictly turn-based, but adding the ability to switch out onscreen characters for others in the party. The mechanic, however, returned in its sequel, Final Fantasy X-2, which also added mechanics such as timing, player positioning and dresspheres that granted characters new abilities.

== Reception ==
Richard Eisenbeis of Kotaku wrote that while he initially turned off the Active Time Battle system in Final Fantasy games because it was difficult to navigate the spells in time, he later came to enjoy the combat of Tales games more for their pure action mechanics. He argued that RPG battles could not be captivating unless they either had an additional strategic layer, such as positional manipulation in Radiant Historia, or a means to keep the player active akin to ATB, calling "standing in a single line trading attacks" an outdated system. Colin Stevens of Hardcore Gamer called ATB "both elegantly simple and unendingly complex", noting that it "creates tension in a genre that had long been about a more drawn out and thoughtful series of encounters", and stating that it created an "impending sense of urgency".

Edwin Evans-Thirlwell of Eurogamer explained that "most Final Fantasies circle back to ATB in some way, striving to rebottle the lightning", calling Final Fantasy VII Remake "an exquisite but flawed attempt to blend the rhythms of the old FF7 battle system with [...] action movie choreography". He noted that "ATB obliges you to think of party members as individuals, dancing to their own beats", stating his opinion that it was "an appropriate development, given the increasing elaborateness of Final Fantasy's writing".

== Legacy ==
Square Enix's Final Fantasy VII Remake, similar to later entries in the series, utilized an action battle system, but retained the original's game's ATB mechanics in a reversed way, allowing players to fight in real-time but optionally pause the game once the bar had been filled to choose special actions from a menu. The company continued to make spin-offs that utilized Active Time Battle in a more traditional form, such as World of Final Fantasy.
