= List of video games released in 2023 =

The following is a comprehensive index of all games released in 2023, sorted chronologically by release date, and divided by quarter. Information regarding developer, publisher, operating system, genre, and type of release is provided where available

For a summary of 2023 in video games as a whole, see 2023 in video games.

== Legend ==
Video game platforms
| Arcade | Arcade video game | ATRVCS | Atari VCS | DROID | Android |
| iOS | iOS, iPhone, iPod, iPadOS, iPad, visionOS, Apple Vision Pro | LIN | Linux, SteamOS | Luna | Amazon Luna |
| OSX | macOS | NS | Nintendo Switch | PICO4 | PICO 4 |
| PS4 | PlayStation 4 | PS5 | PlayStation 5 | Quest | Meta Quest / Oculus Quest family, including Oculus Rift |
| Stadia | Google Stadia | WIN | Windows, all versions Windows 95 and up | XBO | Xbox One |
| XBX/S | Xbox Series X/S | | | | |

Types of releases
| Compilation | A compilation, anthology or collection of several titles, usually (but not always) belonging to the same series |
| Early access | A game launched in early access is unfinished and thus might contain bugs and glitches or have some of the content missing |
| Episodic | An episodic video game that is released in batches over a period of time |
| Expansion | A large-scale DLC to an already existing game that adds new story, areas and additions and/or changes to the game's mechanics |
| Full release | A full release of a game that launched in early access first |
| Limited | A special release (often called "Limited" or "Collector's Edition") with bonus collector's material. Often provided to people who pre-order a game |
| Port | The game first appeared on a different platform and a port was made. The game is like the original, with few or no differences |
| Remake | The game is an enhanced remake of an original, made using a new engine and/or assets and thus containing completely new sound, graphics and possibly changes to the story and/or gameplay |
| Remaster | The game is a remaster of an original, released on the same or different platform, with (usually minor) changes to graphics, sound and/or gameplay |
| Rerelease | The game was re-released on the same platform with no or only minor changes |

Video game genres
| Action | Action game | Action RPG | Action role-playing game | Action-adventure | Action-adventure game |
| Adventure | Adventure game | Brawler | Beat 'em up | Bullet heaven | Vampire Survivors–like |
| Bullet hell | Bullet hell | Business sim | Business simulation game | City builder | City-building game |
| CMS | Construction and management simulation | Dating sim | Dating sim | DCCG | Digital collectible card game |
| Deck building | Deck building game | Digital tabletop | Digital tabletop game | Dungeon crawl | Dungeon crawl |
| Farming | Farm life sim | Fighting | Fighting game | Fitness | Fitness game |
| FPS | First-person shooter | Graphic adventure | Graphic adventure | Hack and slash | Hack and slash |
| Horror | Horror game | Life sim | Life simulation game | Metroidvania | Metroidvania |
| MMO | Massively multiplayer online game | MOBA | Multiplayer online battle arena | Narrative adventure | Narrative adventure game |
| Party | Party video game | PCA | Point-and-click adventure | Platformer | Platformer |
| Puzzle | Puzzle video game | Puzzle-platformer | Puzzle-platformer | Racing | Racing video game |
| Rhythm | Rhythm game | Roguelike | Roguelike, Roguelite | RPG | Role-playing video game |
| RTS | Real-time strategy | Run and gun | Run and gun game | Sandbox | Sandbox game |
| Shoot 'em up | Shoot 'em up | Shooter | Shooter game | Simulation | Simulation video game |
| Social sim | Social simulation game | Sports | Sports video game | Stealth | Stealth game |
| Strategy | Strategy video game | Survival | Survival game | Survival horror | Survival horror |
| Tactical RPG | Tactical role-playing game | TBS | Turn-based strategy | TBT | Turn-based tactics |
| Tower defense | Tower defense | TPS | Third-person shooter | Vehicle sim | Vehicle simulation game |
| Visual novel | Visual novel | | | | |

== List ==
=== January–March ===
| Release date | Title | Platform | Type | Genre | Developer | Publisher | Ref. |
|---|---|---|---|---|---|---|---|
| January 5 | Eversoul | DROID, iOS | | RPG | NINEARK | Kakao Games | |
| January 5 | Shieldmaiden: Remix Edition | NS, XBO, XBX/S | | Action, Platformer | Dumativa | | |
| January 10 | Aquatico | WIN | | City builder | Digital Reef Games | Overseer Games | |
| January 10 | Teenage Mutant Ninja Turtles: Shredder's Revenge | iOS, DROID | | Brawler | Tribute Games | Netflix Games | |
| January 11 | Children of Silentown | WIN, NS, PS4, PS5, XBO, XBX/S | | Adventure | Elf Games | Daedalic Entertainment | |
| January 11 | Sailing Era | WIN | | Simulation, RPG | Gy Games | Bilibili | |
| January 11 | Yuppie Psycho: Executive Edition | PS4 | | Survival horror | Baroque Decay | Neon Doctrine | |
| January 12 | Burrow of the Fallen Bear | NS, PS4, PS5 | | Visual novel | Male Doll | Eastasiasoft | |
| January 12 | Drago Noka | WIN, NS | | CMS | Gesei Unkan | Playism | |
| January 12 | Lone Ruin | WIN, NS | | Roguelike | Super Rare Originals | Cuddle Monster Games | |
| January 12 | Vengeful Guardian: Moonrider | WIN, NS, PS4, PS5 | | Action, Platformer | JoyMasher | The Arcade Crew | |
| January 13 | Dragon Ball Z: Kakarot | PS5 | | Action RPG | CyberConnect2 | Bandai Namco Entertainment | |
| January 13 | One Piece Odyssey | WIN, PS4, PS5, XBX/S | | RPG | ILCA | Bandai Namco Entertainment | |
| January 13 | Worm Game | Stadia | | Snake | Stadia Platform Content | | |
| January 17 | World Championship Boxing Manager II | WIN | | Simulation, Sports | Mega Cat Studios | Ziggurat Interactive | |
| January 18 | Graze Counter GM | WIN, NS, PS4, PS5, XBO, XBX/S | | Shoot 'em up | Bikkuri Software | Henteko Doujin | |
| January 18 | The Legend of Tianding | PS4, PS5 | | Platformer, Brawler | CGCG | Neon Doctrine | |
| January 19 | Colossal Cave | WIN, NS, PS5, XBX/S | | Adventure | Cygnus Entertainment | | |
| January 19 | NeverAwake | NS, PS4, PS5 | | Shoot 'em up | Neotro | Phoenixx | |
| January 19 | Persona 3 Portable | WIN, NS, PS4, XBO, XBX/S | | RPG, Social sim | Atlus | Sega | |
| January 19 | Persona 4 Golden | NS, PS4, XBO, XBX/S | | RPG, Social sim | Atlus | Sega | |
| January 19 | A Space for the Unbound | WIN, NS, PS4, PS5, XBO, XBX/S | | Adventure | Mojiken Studio | Toge Productions | |
| January 19 | Tortuga: A Pirate's Tale | WIN, PS4, PS5, XBO, XBX/S | | Strategy, Adventure | Gaming Minds Studios | Kalypso Media | |
| January 20 | Fire Emblem Engage | NS | | Tactical RPG | Intelligent Systems | Nintendo | |
| January 20 | Monster Hunter Rise | PS4, PS5, XBO, XBX/S | | Action RPG | Capcom | | |
| January 20 | Pocket Card Jockey: Ride On! | iOS | | Digital tabletop | Game Freak | | |
| January 23 | OddBallers | WIN, NS, PS4, XBO, Luna | | Party | Ubisoft Mumbai, Ubisoft Pune, Game Swing | Ubisoft | |
| January 23 | Various Daylife | iOS, DROID | | RPG | Dokidoki Grooveworks, Square Enix | Square Enix | |
| January 24 | Forspoken | WIN, PS5 | | Action RPG | Luminous Productions | Square Enix | |
| January 24 | Hyperdimension Neptunia: Sisters vs. Sisters | WIN, PS4, PS5 | | RPG | Compile Heart | Idea Factory | |
| January 24 | Mahokenshi | WIN | | Strategy, Deck building | Game Source Studio | Iceberg Interactive | |
| January 24 | NBA All-World | iOS, DROID | | Sports | Niantic, HypGames | Niantic | |
| January 24 | Risen | NS, PS4, XBO | | Action RPG | Piranha Bytes | THQ Nordic | |
| January 24 | Warlander | WIN | | Action | Toylogic | Plaion | |
| January 24 | World War Z: Aftermath | PS5, XBX/S | | TPS, FPS | Saber Interactive | | |
| January 25 | Hi-Fi Rush | WIN, XBX/S | Original | Rhythm, Action | Tango Gameworks | Bethesda Softworks | |
| January 26 | Devolver Tumble Time | iOS, DROID | | Tile-matching | NoPoPo | Devolver Digital | |
| January 26 | Disgaea 7: Vows of the Virtueless (JP) | NS, PS4, PS5 | | Tactical RPG | Nippon Ichi Software | | |
| January 26 | Hitman World of Assassination | WIN, NS, PS4, PS5, XBO, XBX/S | | Stealth | IO Interactive | | |
| January 26 | Pizza Tower | WIN | | Action, Platformer | Tour De Pizza | | |
| January 26 | Power Chord | WIN | | Deck building (roguelike) | Big Blue Bubble | | |
| January 26 | Shoulders of Giants | WIN, XBO, XBX/S | | Roguelike, Action-adventure | Moving Pieces Interactive | | |
| January 26 | Story of Seasons: A Wonderful Life (JP) | NS | | Simulation, RPG | Marvelous | | |
| January 26 | Summer Time Rendering: Another Horizon (JP) | NS, PS4 | | Visual novel | Mages | | |
| January 26 | Wonder Boy Anniversary Collection | NS, PS4, PS5 | | —N/a | Bliss Brain | | |
| January 27 | Alice Escaped! | WIN, NS | | Metroidvania | illuCalab | Sekai Project | |
| January 27 | Atone: Heart of the Elder Tree | WIN, NS, PS4 | | Adventure, Puzzle, Rhythm | Wildboy Studios | Untold Tales | |
| January 27 | Dead Space | WIN, PS5, XBX/S | Remake | Survival horror | Motive Studios | Electronic Arts | |
| January 27 | GoldenEye 007 | NS, XBO, XBX/S | Port | FPS | Rare, Code Mystics | Nintendo, Xbox Game Studios | |
| January 30 | Backfirewall | WIN, PS4, PS5, XBO, XBX/S | | Adventure | Naraven Games | All in! Games | |
| January 30 | Trek to Yomi | NS | | Action | Flying Wild Hog | Devolver Digital | |
| January 31 | 8-Bit Adventures 2 | WIN | | RPG | Critical Games | | |
| January 31 | Age of Empires II: Definitive Edition | XBO, XBX/S | | RTS | Forgotten Empires | Xbox Game Studios | |
| January 31 | Avatar Generations | iOS, DROID | | TBS, RPG | Navigation Games | CDE Entertainment | |
| January 31 | Industries of Titan | WIN | | City builder | Brace Yourself Games | | |
| January 31 | PowerWash Simulator | NS, PS4, PS5 | | Simulation | FuturLab | Square Enix Collective | |
| January 31 | Raiden IV x MIKADO remix (NA) | WIN, PS4, PS5, XBO, XBX/S | | Shoot 'em up | Moss | NIS America | |
| January 31 | Season: A Letter to the Future | WIN, PS4, PS5 | | Adventure | Scavengers Studio | | |
| January 31 | SpongeBob SquarePants: The Cosmic Shake | WIN, NS, PS4, XBO | | Platformer | Purple Lamp | THQ Nordic | |
| January 31 | Valiant Hearts: Coming Home | iOS, DROID | | Adventure | Old Skull Games | Netflix Games | |
| January 31 | We Were Here Forever | PS4, PS5, XBO, XBX/S | | Puzzle, Adventure | Total Mayhem Games | | |
| February 1 | Football Manager 2023 | PS5 | | Sports | Sports Interactive | Sega | |
| February 1 | Rhythm Sprout | WIN, NS, PS4, PS5, XBO, XBX/S | | Rhythm, Action | Surt | tinyBuild | |
| February 2 | Brave's Rage | WIN, NS, PS5 | | Deck building (roguelike) | ISVR | Astrolabe Games | |
| February 2 | Chef Life: A Restaurant Simulator | WIN, NS, PS4, PS5, XBO, XBX/S | | Simulation | Cyanide | Nacon | |
| February 2 | Deliver Us Mars | WIN, PS4, PS5, XBO, XBX/S | | Adventure | KeokeN Interactive | Frontier Foundry | |
| February 2 | Fashion Police Squad | NS, PS4, PS5, XBO, XBX/S | | FPS | Mopeful Games | No More Robots | |
| February 2 | Life Is Strange 2 | NS | Port | Graphic adventure | Dontnod Entertainment | Square Enix | |
| February 2 | Mega Man X | DROID | Port | Platformer | Capcom | | |
| February 2 | The Pathless | WIN, NS, XBO, XBX/S | | Action-adventure | Giant Squid | Annapurna Interactive | |
| February 2 | Perish | WIN | | Roguelike, FPS | Item42 | HandyGames | |
| February 2 | Puzzle Bobble 2 / Bust-A-Move 2 Arcade Edition | WIN, NS, PS4, XBO | | Puzzle | City Connection | | |
| February 2 | Puzzle Bobble 3 / Bust-A-Move 3 S-Tribute | WIN, NS, PS4, XBO | | Puzzle | City Connection | | |
| February 2 | Tails: The Backbone Preludes | WIN | | RPG | EggNut | Raw Fury | |
| February 2 | Your Only Move Is HUSTLE | WIN | | Turn-based, Fighting | Ivy Sly | | |
| February 3 | Dragon Ball Z: Kakarot | XBX/S | Port | Action RPG | CyberConnect2 | Bandai Namco Entertainment | |
| February 3 | Helvetii | WIN, NS, PS4 | | Action, Roguelike | Team KwaKwa | | |
| February 3 | Joe Wander and the Enigmatic Adventures | WIN, PS5, XBX/S | | Puzzle, Adventure, Platformer | Frozen Pixel | | |
| February 3 | Raiden IV x MIKADO remix (EU) | WIN, PS4, PS5, XBO, XBX/S | | Shoot 'em up | Moss | NIS America | |
| February 3 | SpellForce: Conquest of Eo | WIN | | Tactical RPG | Owned by Gravity | THQ Nordic | |
| February 7 | Endling: Extinction is Forever | iOS, DROID | | Adventure, Survival | Herobeat Studios | HandyGames | |
| February 8 | Alone in the Dark: The New Nightmare (GBC) | NS | Port | Survival horror | Darkworks, Pocket Studios | Infogrames | |
| February 8 | Game & Watch Gallery 3 | NS | Compilation, Port | Action | Nintendo R&D1, Tose | Nintendo | |
| February 8 | Gargoyle's Quest | NS | Port | Action-adventure, Platformer | Capcom | Capcom, Nintendo | |
| February 8 | Kirby's Dream Land | NS | Port | Platformer | HAL Laboratory | Nintendo | |
| February 8 | Kuru Kuru Kururin | NS | Port | Puzzle | Eighting | Nintendo | |
| February 8 | The Legend of Zelda: Link's Awakening DX | NS | Port | Action-adventure | Nintendo R&D2 | Nintendo | |
| February 8 | The Legend of Zelda: The Minish Cap | NS | Port | Action-adventure | Capcom, Flagship | Nintendo | |
| February 8 | Mario & Luigi: Superstar Saga | NS | Port | RPG | AlphaDream | Nintendo | |
| February 8 | Mario Kart: Super Circuit | NS | Port | Racing (kart) | Intelligent Systems | Nintendo | |
| February 8 | Metroid II: Return of Samus | NS | Port | Action-adventure | Nintendo R&D1 | Nintendo | |
| February 8 | Metroid Prime Remastered | NS | Remaster | Action-adventure | Retro Studios | Nintendo | |
| February 8 | Super Mario Advance 4: Super Mario Bros. 3 | NS | Port | Platformer | Nintendo R&D2 | Nintendo | |
| February 8 | Super Mario Land 2: 6 Golden Coins | NS | Port | Platformer | Nintendo R&D1 | Nintendo | |
| February 8 | Tetris (GB) | NS | Port | Puzzle | Nintendo R&D1 | Nintendo | |
| February 8 | Wario Land 3 | NS | Port | Platformer | Nintendo R&D1 | Nintendo | |
| February 8 | WarioWare, Inc.: Mega Microgames! | NS | Port | Action | Nintendo R&D1 | Nintendo | |
| February 8 | WBSC eBaseball: Power Pros | NS, PS4 | | Sports, Action | Konami | | |
| February 8 | Yakuman (JP) | NS | Port | Digital tabletop | Intelligent Systems | Nintendo | |
| February 9 | Mercenaries Lament: Requiem of the Silver Wolf (JP) | NS | | Strategy, RPG | RideonJapan | | |
| February 10 | Hogwarts Legacy | WIN, PS5, XBX/S | Original | Action RPG | Avalanche Software | Warner Bros. Games | |
| February 14 | Blanc | WIN, NS | | Adventure | Casus Ludi | Gearbox Publishing | |
| February 14 | Journey to the Savage Planet | PS5, XBX/S | | FPS | Raccoon Logic | 505 Games | |
| February 14 | Labyrinth of Galleria: The Moon Society | WIN, NS, PS4, PS5 | | Action RPG | Nippon Ichi Software | | |
| February 14 | Souls of Chronos | WIN, NS, PS5 | | RPG | Astrolabe Games | Futu Studio | |
| February 14 | Spy Bros.: Pipi & Bibi's DX | WIN, NS | | Platformer | RAWRLAB Games | | |
| February 14 | Toaplan Arcade Shoot 'Em Up Collection Vol. 1 | WIN, OSX, LIN | | Shoot 'em up | Bitwave Games | | |
| February 14 | Tomb Raider Reloaded | iOS, DROID | | Roguelike | Emerald City Games | CDE Entertainment | |
| February 14 | Wanted: Dead | WIN, PS4, PS5, XBO, XBX/S | | Action, Hack and slash | Soleil | 110 Industries | |
| February 15 | Cities: Skylines – Remastered | PS5, XBX/S | Remaster | City builder, CMS | Colossal Order | Paradox Interactive | |
| February 15 | Goddess of Victory: Nikke | WIN | | TPS, Action RPG | Shift Up | Level Infinite | |
| February 15 | Ikki Unite | WIN | | Roguelike, Action | Sunsoft | | |
| February 15 | Pharaoh: A New Era | WIN | | City builder | Triskell Interactive | Dotemu | |
| February 15 | Returnal | WIN | | TPS | Housemarque | Sony Interactive Entertainment | |
| February 16 | Dust & Neon | WIN, NS | | Roguelike | David Marquardt Studios | Rogue Games | |
| February 16 | Elderand | WIN, NS | | Metroidvania | Mantra, Sinergia Games | Graffiti Games | |
| February 16 | Loretta | WIN | | Adventure | Yakov Butuzoff | Dangen Entertainment | |
| February 16 | Shadow Warrior 3: Definitive Edition | WIN, PS5, XBX/S | | FPS | Flying Wild Hog | Devolver Digital | |
| February 16 | Tales of Symphonia Remastered (JP) | NS, PS4, XBO | | Action RPG | Bandai Namco Entertainment Romania | Bandai Namco Entertainment | |
| February 16 | Theatrhythm Final Bar Line | NS, PS4 | | Rhythm | indieszero | Square Enix | |
| February 17 | Bill & Ted's Excellent Retro Collection | NS, PS4, PS5 | | Action-adventure | Rocket Science Productions, Beam Software | Limited Run Games | |
| February 17 | Birth | OSX, WIN | | Puzzle | Madison Karrh | Wings Interactive | |
| February 17 | Rooftop Renegade | WIN, NS, PS4, XBO | | Action, Platformer | Melonhead Games | | |
| February 17 | The Settlers: New Allies | WIN | | Strategy | Ubisoft Blue Byte | Ubisoft | |
| February 17 | Tales of Symphonia Remastered | NS, PS4, XBO | | Action RPG | Bandai Namco Entertainment Romania | Bandai Namco Entertainment | |
| February 17 | Wild Hearts | WIN, PS5, XBX/S | | Action RPG | Omega Force | Electronic Arts | |
| February 21 | Akka Arrh | WIN, NS, PS4, PS5, XBO, XBX/S, ATRVCS | | Action | Llamasoft | Atari | |
| February 21 | Atomic Heart | WIN, PS4, PS5, XBO, XBX/S | | Action RPG, FPS | Mundfish | Focus Entertainment | |
| February 21 | Like a Dragon: Ishin! | WIN, PS4, PS5, XBO, XBX/S | | Action-adventure | Ryu Ga Gotoku Studio | Sega | |
| February 21 | Seven Doors | NS, PS4, PS5, XBO, XBX/S | | Puzzle | Indigo Studios | Soedesco | |
| February 21 | Ultimate Sackboy | iOS, DROID | | Endless runner | Exient Entertainment | | |
| February 22 | After the Fall | PS5 | | Action, FPS | Vertigo Games | | |
| February 22 | Altair Breaker | PS5 | | Fighting | Thirdverse | | |
| February 22 | Cities VR - Enhanced Edition | PS5 | | City builder, CMS | Fast Travel Games | | |
| February 22 | Cosmonious High | PS5 | | Adventure | Owlchemy Labs | | |
| February 22 | Demeo | PS5 | | RPG | Resolution Games | | |
| February 22 | Digimon World: Next Order | WIN, NS | | RPG | B.B. Studio | Bandai Namco Entertainment | |
| February 22 | Dyschronia: Chronos Alternate | PS5 | | Adventure | IzanagiGames, MyDearest | | |
| February 22 | Fantavision 202X | PS5 | | Action, Puzzle | Cosmo Machia | | |
| February 22 | Horizon Call of the Mountain | PS5 | | Action-adventure | Guerrilla Games, Firesprite | Sony Interactive Entertainment | |
| February 22 | Job Simulator | PS5 | | Simulation | Owlchemy Labs | | |
| February 22 | Jurassic World Aftermath Collection | PS5 | | Stealth | Coatsink | | |
| February 22 | Kizuna AI: Touch the Beat! | PS5 | | Rhythm | Gemdrops | | |
| February 22 | The Last Clockwinder | PS5 | | Puzzle | Pontoco | Cyan Ventures | |
| February 22 | The Light Brigade | WIN, PS5, Quest | | Roguelike, FPS | Funktronic Labs | | |
| February 22 | Moss | PS5 | | Adventure, Puzzle | Polyarc | | |
| February 22 | Moss: Book II | PS5 | | Adventure, Puzzle | Polyarc | | |
| February 22 | Pistol Whip | PS5 | | Action, Rhythm, FPS | Cloudhead Games | | |
| February 22 | Redemption Reapers | WIN, NS, PS4 | | Strategy, RPG | Adglobe | Binary Haze Interactive | |
| February 22 | Runner | PS5 | | Action | Truant Pixel | | |
| February 22 | Star Wars: Tales from the Galaxy's Edge - Enhanced Edition | PS5 | | FPS | ILMxLab | Disney Interactive | |
| February 22 | The Tale of Onogoro | PS5 | | Action-adventure | Amata K.K. | | |
| February 22 | Tentacular | PS5 | | Action, Puzzle | Firepunchd Games | Devolver Digital | |
| February 22 | Tetris Effect: Connected | PS5 | | Puzzle | Monstars, Resonair, Stage Games | Enhance Games | |
| February 22 | Thumper | PS5 | | Rhythm | Drool | | |
| February 22 | Vacation Simulator | PS5 | | Simulation | Owlchemy Labs | | |
| February 23 | Blood Bowl 3 | WIN, PS4, PS5, XBO, XBX/S | | Sports | Cyanide | Nacon | |
| February 23 | Company of Heroes 3 | WIN | | RTS | Relic Entertainment | Sega | |
| February 23 | Gal Guardians: Demon Purge | WIN, NS, PS4, PS5, XBO, XBX/S | | Action | Inti Creates | | |
| February 23 | Raiden III x Mikado Maniax (JP) | WIN, NS, PS4, PS5, XBO, XBX/S | | Shoot 'em up | Moss | | |
| February 24 | Clive 'N' Wrench | WIN, NS, PS4, PS5 | | Platformer | Dinosaur Bytes | WW: Numskull Games; EU: PM Studios | |
| February 24 | Kirby's Return to Dream Land Deluxe | NS | Remaster | Platformer | HAL Laboratory | Nintendo | |
| February 24 | Octopath Traveler II | WIN, NS, PS4, PS5 | | RPG | Acquire, Square Enix | Square Enix | |
| February 24 | The Pale Beyond | WIN, OSX | | RPG, Survival | Bellular Studios | Fellow Traveller | |
| February 28 | Catan:Console Edition | PS4, PS5, XBO, XBX/S | | Digital tabletop | Dovetail Games | | |
| February 28 | Dungeons of Aether | WIN | | TBS | Dan Fornace, AmpersandBear | Dan Fornace | |
| February 28 | Phantom Brigade | WIN | | TBT | Brace Yourself Games | | |
| February 28 | Scars Above | WIN, PS4, PS5, XBO, XBX/S | | TPS | Mad Head Games | Prime Matter | |
| February 28 | Street Fighter: Duel | iOS, DROID | | Fighting | Topjoy | Capcom, Crunchyroll Games | |
| February 28 | void tRrLM2(); Void Terrarium 2 | NS, PS4 | | Roguelike, Action RPG | Nippon Ichi Software | | |
| March 1 | Bendy and the Dark Revival | PS4, PS5, XBO, XBX/S | | Survival horror | Kindly Beast | Rooster Teeth Games | |
| March 1 | Brok the InvestiGator | NS, PS4, PS5, XBO | | PCA, Brawler | CowCat Games | | |
| March 1 | Fight'N Rage | PS5, XBX/S | | Brawler | Seba Games Dev | BlitWorks | |
| March 1 | Leap | WIN, PS4, PS5, XBO, XBX/S | | FPS | Blue Isle Studios | | |
| March 2 | Fitness Boxing Fist of the North Star | NS | | Fitness | Imagineer | | |
| March 2 | Meg's Monster | WIN, NS, XBO, XBX/S | | Adventure, RPG | Odencat | | |
| March 2 | Rune Factory 3 Special (JP) | NS | | Simulation, RPG | Marvelous | | |
| March 3 | void tRrLM2(); Void Terrarium 2 (EU/OC) | NS, PS4 | | Roguelike, Action RPG | Nippon Ichi Software | | |
| March 3 | Wo Long: Fallen Dynasty | WIN, PS4, PS5, XBO, XBX/S | | Action RPG | Team Ninja | Koei Tecmo | |
| March 7 | The Outer Worlds: Spacer's Choice Edition | PS5, XBX/S | | Action RPG | Obsidian Entertainment | Private Division | |
| March 7 | Outlanders | WIN | | City builder | Pomelo Games | | |
| March 7 | Rogue Spirit | WIN, PS5, XBX/S | | Action, Roguelike | Kids With Sticks | 505 Games | |
| March 7 | Romancelvania | WIN, PS5, XBX/S | | Action RPG | The Deep End Games | 2124 Publishing | |
| March 9 | Caverns of Mars: Recharged | WIN, NS, PS4, PS5, XBO, XBX/S | | Scrolling shooter | Adamvision Studios | Atari | |
| March 9 | Clash: Artifacts of Chaos | WIN, PS4, PS5, XBO, XBX/S | | Action RPG, Brawler | ACE Team | Nacon | |
| March 9 | Fatal Frame: Mask of the Lunar Eclipse | WIN, NS, PS4, PS5, XBO, XBX/S | | Survival horror | Koei Tecmo, Grasshopper Manufacture | Koei Tecmo | |
| March 9 | Figment 2: Creed Valley | WIN, NS, PS4, PS5, XBO, XBX/S | | Action-adventure, Puzzle | Bedtime Digital Games | | |
| March 9 | Ib | NS | | Horror (psych), Adventure | Kouri | Playism | |
| March 9 | The Last Spell | WIN, NS, PS4, PS5 | | TBS, RPG | Ishtar Games | The Arcade Crew | |
| March 9 | Metroid Fusion | NS | Port | Action-adventure | Nintendo R&D1 | Nintendo | |
| March 9 | Monster Energy Supercross: The Official Videogame 6 | WIN, PS4, PS5, XBO, XBX/S | | Racing | Milestone | | |
| March 9 | Oni: Road to Be The Mightiest Oni | NS | | Action-adventure | Kenei Design, Shueisha Games | Clouded Leopard Entertainment | |
| March 9 | Paranormasight: The Seven Mysteries of Honjo | NS, iOS, DROID | | Horror, Adventure | Square Enix | | |
| March 9 | Ray'z Arcade Chronology (JP) | NS, PS4 | | Shoot 'em up | M2 | Taito | |
| March 9 | Record of Agarest War | NS | | Tactical RPG | Compile Heart | Aksys Games | |
| March 9 | Session: Skate Sim (NA) | NS | | Sports | Crea-ture Studios | Nacon | |
| March 9 | Space Tail: Every Journey Leads Home | PS4, PS5, XBO, XBX/S | | Adventure, Platformer | Longterm Games, Enjoy Studio | Longterm Games | |
| March 9 | The Testament of Sherlock Holmes | NS | | Adventure | Frogwares | | |
| March 9 | Tiny Troopers: Global Ops | WIN, NS, PS4, PS5, XBO, XBX/S | | Shoot 'em up (twin-stick) | Epiphany Games | Wired Productions | |
| March 9 | Transport Fever 2 | PS4, PS5, XBO, XBX/S | | Business sim | Urban Games | Nacon | |
| March 10 | Before Your Eyes | PS5 | | Adventure | GoodbyeWorld Games | Skybound Games | |
| March 10 | Bleak Faith: Forsaken | WIN | | Action RPG | Archangel Studios | | |
| March 10 | DC's Justice League: Cosmic Chaos | WIN, NS, PS4, PS5, XBO, XBX/S | | Action-adventure | PHL Collective | Outright Games | |
| March 10 | Mato Anomalies | WIN, NS, PS4, PS5, XBO, XBX/S | | RPG | Arrowiz | Prime Matter | |
| March 11 | Sun Haven | WIN | | RPG, Farming | Pixel Sprout Studios | | |
| March 13 | Barotrauma | WIN | | Survival horror, RPG | Undertow Games, Fakefish Games | Daedalic Entertainment | |
| March 13 | Life of Delta | WIN, NS | | PCA | Airo Games | Daedalic Entertainment | |
| March 14 | The Forest Cathedral | WIN, XBX/S | | Adventure | Brian Wilson | Whitethorn Games | |
| March 14 | Hot Wheels: Rift Rally | iOS, PS4, PS5 | | Racing | Velan Studios | | |
| March 14 | The Legend of Heroes: Trails to Azure (NA) | WIN, NS, PS4 | | RPG | Nihon Falcom | NIS America | |
| March 14 | Spin Rhythm XD | WIN | | Rhythm | Super Spin Digital | | |
| March 14 | Terminal Velocity: Boosted Edition | WIN, NS | | Shooter | Terminal Reality | Ziggurat Interactive | |
| March 14 | Vernal Edge | WIN, NS, PS4, PS5, XBO, XBX/S | | Metroidvania, Action | Hello Penguin Team | PID Games | |
| March 14 | The Wreck | WIN, PS4, PS5, XBO, XBX/S, NS | | Narrative adventure, Visual novel | The Pixel Hunt | | |
| March 15 | Blade of Darkness | PS4, PS5, XBO, XBX/S | | Action | Rebel Act Studios, Fire Falcom | SNEG | |
| March 15 | BurgerTime Deluxe | NS | Port | Action, Maze, Platformer | Data East | | |
| March 15 | Kirby's Dream Land 2 | NS | Port | Platformer | HAL Laboratory | Nintendo | |
| March 15 | Side Pocket | NS | Port | Sports (billiards/pool) | Data East | | |
| March 15 | Wolcen: Lords of Mayhem | PS4, XBO | | Action RPG | Wolcen Studio | | |
| March 15 | Xevious | NS | Port | Scrolling shooter | Namco | Namco, Atari, Inc. | |
| March 16 | Alice Gear Aegis CS: Concerto of Simulatrix | NS, PS4, PS5 | | Action | Pyramid | PQube | |
| March 16 | Anno 1800 Console Edition | PS5, XBX/S | | City builder, RTS | Ubisoft Blue Byte | Ubisoft | |
| March 16 | The Dark Pictures: Switchback VR | PS5 | | Horror | Supermassive Games | | |
| March 16 | McPixel 3 | PS4, PS5 | | Puzzle | Sos Sosowski | Devolver Digital | |
| March 16 | Post Void | NS, PS4 | | FPS | YCJY Games | Super Rare Originals | |
| March 16 | Session: Skate Sim (EU) | NS | | Sports | Crea-ture Studios | Nacon | |
| March 17 | Bayonetta Origins: Cereza and the Lost Demon | NS | | Action-adventure | PlatinumGames | Nintendo | |
| March 17 | Flame Keeper | WIN, NS | | Roguelike, Action | Kautki Cave | Untold Tales | |
| March 17 | The Legend of Heroes: Trails to Azure (EU) | WIN, NS, PS4 | | RPG | Nihon Falcom | NIS America | |
| March 17 | WWE 2K23 | WIN, PS4, PS5, XBO, XBX/S | | Sports | Visual Concepts | 2K Sports | |
| March 21 | Deceive Inc. | WIN, PS5, XBX/S | | Stealth | Sweet Bandits Studios | Tripwire Presents | |
| March 21 | Mighty Doom | iOS, DROID | | Shoot 'em up | Alpha Dog Games | Bethesda Softworks | |
| March 21 | Ni no Kuni II: Revenant Kingdom | XBO, XBX/S | | RPG | Level-5 | Bandai Namco Entertainment | |
| March 21 | Remnant: From the Ashes | NS | | Action RPG, TPS | Gunfire Games | Perfect World Entertainment | |
| March 21 | Tchia | WIN, PS4, PS5 | | Action-adventure | Awaceb | | |
| March 21 | The Walking Dead: Saints & Sinners – Chapter 2: Retribution | WIN, PS5 | Episodic | FPS, Survival horror | Skydance Interactive | | |
| March 22 | Have a Nice Death | WIN, NS | | Metroidvania, Platformer, Adventure | Magic Design Studios | Gearbox Publishing San Francisco | |
| March 23 | Atelier Ryza 3: Alchemist of the End & the Secret Key (JP) | WIN, NS, PS4, PS5 | | RPG | Gust | Koei Tecmo | |
| March 23 | Mr. Saitou | WIN, OSX, LIN, NS | | Adventure | Leeble Forest | | |
| March 23 | Omen of Sorrow | WIN, NS, PS5 | | Fighting | AOne Games | Eastasiasoft | |
| March 23 | R-Type Final 3 Evolved (JP) | PS5 | | Shoot 'em up | Granzella | Granzella | |
| March 23 | Rakuen | NS | | Adventure | Leeble Forest | | |
| March 23 | SD Shin Kamen Rider Rumble (JP) | WIN, NS | | Brawler | Bandai Namco Entertainment | | |
| March 23 | Song of Memories | NS | | Visual novel | PureWish | Future Tech Lab | |
| March 23 | Storyteller | WIN, NS | | Puzzle, Adventure | Daniel Benmergui | Annapurna Interactive | |
| March 24 | The Legend of Heroes: Trails to Azure (OC) | WIN, NS, PS4 | | RPG | Nihon Falcom | NIS America | |
| March 24 | Resident Evil 4 | WIN, PS4, PS5, XBX/S | Remake | Survival horror | Capcom | | |
| March 25 | The Coffin of Andy and Leyley | WIN | | Horror (psych), Adventure | Nemlei | Kit9 Studio | |
| March 27 | 9 Years of Shadows | WIN | | Metroidvania | Halberd Studios | Freedom Games | |
| March 28 | Crime Boss: Rockay City | WIN | | FPS | Ingame Studios | 505 Games | |
| March 28 | The Last of Us Part I | WIN | Port | Action-adventure | Naughty Dog | Sony Interactive Entertainment | |
| March 28 | MLB The Show 23 | NS, PS4, PS5, XBO, XBX/S | | Sports | San Diego Studio | Sony Interactive Entertainment | |
| March 28 | Sifu | XBO, XBX/S | | Brawler | Sloclap | | |
| March 28 | Terra Nil | WIN, iOS, DROID | | City builder | Free Lives | Devolver Digital | |
| March 29 | Gripper | WIN, NS | | Action | Heart Core | | |
| March 30 | Assault Suits Valken Declassified | NS | | Run and gun | M2 | Rainmaker Productions | |
| March 30 | Dredge | WIN, NS, PS4, PS5, XBO, XBX/S | | Fishing, Adventure | Black Salt Games | Team17 | |
| March 30 | The Great War: Western Front | WIN | | RTS | Petroglyph Games | Frontier Foundry | |
| March 30 | The Last Worker | WIN, NS, PS5, XBX/S | | Adventure | Wolf & Wood, Oiffy | Wire Productions | |
| March 30 | Lunark | WIN, NS, XBO, XBX/S | | Platformer, Adventure | Canari Games | WayForward | |
| March 30 | Norn9: Var Commons | NS | | Visual novel | Regista | Aksys Games | |
| March 30 | Ravenbound | WIN | | Action RPG, Roguelike | Systemic Reaction | | |
| March 30 | Saga of Sins | WIN, NS, PS4, PS5, XBO, XBX/S | | Action-adventure | Bonus Level Entertainment | Just For Games | |
| March 30 | Total Tanks Generals | WIN | | Simulation | Noobz | 505 Games | |
| March 30 | Winning Post 10 (JP) | WIN, NS, PS4, PS5 | | Simulation | Koei Tecmo | | |
| March 31 | Blade Assault | NS, PS4, PS5, XBO, XBX/S | | Roguelike, Platformer | Team Suneat | PM Studios | |
| March 31 | Citizen Sleeper | PS4, PS5 | | RPG | Jump Over the Age | Fellow Traveller | |
| March 31 | The Murder of Sonic the Hedgehog | WIN, OSX | | Visual novel, PCA | Sega Social Team | Sega | |
| March 31 | Troublemaker: Raise Your Gang | WIN | | Action-adventure | Gamecom Team | Freedom Games | |

=== April–June ===
| Release date | Title | Platform | Type | Genre | Developer | Publisher | Ref. |
|---|---|---|---|---|---|---|---|
| April 4 | Atari Mania | PS4, PS5 | | Action | Illogika | Atari | |
| April 4 | Creed: Rise to Glory – Championship Edition | PS5, Quest | | Fighting | Survios | | |
| April 4 | GrimGrimoire OnceMore | NS, PS4, PS5 | | RTS | Vanillaware | NIS America | |
| April 4 | Meet Your Maker | WIN, PS4, PS5, XBO, XBX/S | | Strategy | Behaviour Interactive | | |
| April 4 | Road 96: Mile 0 | WIN, NS, PS4, PS5, XBO, XBX/S | | Adventure | DigixArt | Ravenscourt | |
| April 5 | Immortality | OSX | | Interactive film | Sam Barlow | Half Mermaid Productions | |
| April 5 | Raji: An Ancient Epic | iOS, DROID | | Action-adventure | Nodding Heads Games | Netflix Games | |
| April 5 | Sid Meier's Railroads! | iOS, DROID | | Business sim | Feral Interactive | | |
| April 6 | Across the Valley | WIN, PS5 | | Simulation | FusionPlay | | |
| April 6 | Batora: Lost Haven | NS | | Action-adventure | Stormind Games | Team17 | |
| April 6 | Curse of the Sea Rats | WIN, NS, PS4, PS5, XBO, XBX/S | | Metroidvania | Petoons Studio | PQube | |
| April 6 | Dungeons of Aether | NS | | TBS | Dan Fornace, AmpersandBear | Dan Fornace | |
| April 6 | Everspace 2 | WIN | | Vehicle sim (spaceship), Action RPG | Rockfish Games | | |
| April 6 | Marfusha | NS, PS4, PS5, XBX/S | | Shoot 'em up | Hinyari9 | Playism | |
| April 6 | Melon Journey: Bittersweet Memories | WIN, NS, PS4, PS5, XBO, XBX/S | | Adventure | Froach Club, Poppy Works | Xseed Games | |
| April 6 | Pupperazzi | NS | | Photography | Sundae Month | Kitfox Games | |
| April 7 | EA Sports PGA Tour | WIN, PS5, XBX/S | | Sports | EA Tiburon | Electronic Arts | |
| April 7 | GrimGrimoire OnceMore (EU) | NS, PS4, PS5 | | RTS | Vanillaware | NIS America | |
| April 7 | The Library of Babel | WIN, NS, PS4, PS5, XBO, XBX/S | | Platformer, Stealth | Tanuki Game Studio | Neon Doctrine | |
| April 10 | Inscryption | XBO, XBX/S | Port | Deck building (roguelike) | Daniel Mullins Games | Devolver Digital | |
| April 11 | Peglin | iOS, DROID | | Roguelike | Red Nexus Games | IndieArk | |
| April 11 | Process of Elimination | PS4, NS | | Adventure | Nippon Ichi Software | NIS America | |
| April 11 | Sherlock Holmes: The Awakened | WIN, NS, PS4, PS5, XBO, XBX/S | | Adventure | Frogwares | | |
| April 11 | Tron: Identity | WIN, NS | | Visual novel | Bithell Games | | |
| April 11 | Worms W.M.D: Mobilize | iOS, DROID | | Artillery, Strategy | Team17 | | |
| April 12 | Ghostwire: Tokyo | XBX/S | Port | Action-adventure | Tango Gameworks | Bethesda Softworks | |
| April 12 | Monopoly Go! | iOS, DROID | | Digital tabletop | Scopely | | |
| April 12 | Pokémon Stadium | NS | Port | TBS | Nintendo EAD | Nintendo | |
| April 12 | Wartales | WIN | | Tactical RPG | Shiro Games/Unlimited | | |
| April 12 | Wildfrost | WIN, NS | | Deck building (roguelike) | Deadpan Games, Gaziter | Chucklefish | |
| April 13 | Cannon Dancer – Osman | WIN, NS, PS4, PS5, XBO, XBX/S | | Shoot 'em up | Mitchell Corporation | ININ Games | |
| April 13 | Dokapon Kingdom: Connect (JP) | NS | | RPG | Sting | Compile Heart | |
| April 13 | Kill It With Fire VR | WIN, Quest | | FPS | Casey Donnellan Games | TinyBuild | |
| April 13 | Senjou no Waltz (JP) | NS | | Visual novel | Idea Factory | Idea Factory | |
| April 13 | Tray Racers | WIN, NS | | Racing, Party | Bit Loom | | |
| April 14 | Baldur's Gate: Dark Alliance | iOS, DROID | | Action RPG, Hack and slash | Interplay Entertainment | | |
| April 14 | Brave Dungeon: The Meaning of Justice | WIN, DROID, NS | Full release | RPG | Inside System | | |
| April 14 | Mega Man Battle Network Legacy Collection | WIN, NS, PS4 | Compilation | Platformer, RPG | Capcom | | |
| April 18 | Flicky | NS | Port | Platformer | Sega | | |
| April 18 | God of Rock | WIN, NS, PS4, PS5, XBO, XBX/S | | Rhythm, Fighting | Modus Studios Brazil | Modus Games | |
| April 18 | Kid Chameleon | NS | Port | Platformer | Sega Technical Institute | Sega | |
| April 18 | The Mageseeker: A League of Legends Story | WIN, NS, PS4, PS5, XBO, XBX/S | | Action | Digital Sun | Riot Forge | |
| April 18 | Mighty Quest Rogue Palace | iOS, DROID | | Roguelike, Dungeon crawl | Ubisoft | Netflix Games | |
| April 18 | Minecraft Legends | WIN, NS, PS4, PS5, XBO, XBX/S | | Action, Strategy | Mojang Studios, Blackbird Interactive | Xbox Game Studios | |
| April 18 | Pulseman | NS | Port | Platformer | Game Freak | Sega | |
| April 18 | Street Fighter II': Special Champion Edition | NS | Port | Fighting | Capcom | | |
| April 19 | Afterlife VR | PS5 | | Horror | Split Light Studio | Perp Games | |
| April 19 | Final Fantasy Pixel Remaster | NS, PS4 | | RPG | Square Enix | | |
| April 19 | Five Nights at Freddy's: Security Breach | NS | Port | Survival horror | Steel Wool Studios | ScottGames | |
| April 19 | Gun Jam | WIN | | Rhythm, Action, FPS | Jaw Drop Games | Raw Fury | |
| April 19 | Mercenaries Lament: Requiem of the Silver Wolf (JP) | PS4, PS5 | | Tactical RPG | RideonJapan | | |
| April 19 | Shadows Over Loathing | NS | | PCA | Asymmetric | | |
| April 19 | Teslagrad 2 | WIN, NS, PS4, PS5, XBO, XBX/S | | Puzzle-platformer | Rain Games | Modus Games | |
| April 19 | Teslagrad Remastered | WIN, NS, PS4, PS5, XBO, XBX/S | | Puzzle-platformer | Rain Games | Modus Games | |
| April 20 | Akiba's Trip 2 – Director's Cut (JP) | WIN, NS, PS4 | | Action-adventure, Brawler | Acquire | | |
| April 20 | Arcana of Paradise: The Tower | WIN, NS | | Survival, Roguelike, Action | Tasto Alpha | Shueisha Games | |
| April 20 | Buccanyar (JP) | WIN, NS, PS4, PS5 | | Tower defense | Studio Saizensen | Success | |
| April 20 | Coffee Talk Episode 2: Hibiscus & Butterfly | WIN, OSX, NS, PS4, PS5, XBO, XBX/S | | Visual novel, Simulation | Toge Productions | Toge Productions, Chorus Worldwide | |
| April 20 | DNF Duel | NS | | Fighting | Neople, Eighting, Arc System Works | Nexon | |
| April 20 | Itorah | NS, PS4, XBO | | Action, Platformer | Grimbart Tales | Assemble Entertainment | |
| April 20 | Kanon (JP) | NS | | Visual novel | Key | Prototype | |
| April 20 | Labyrinth of Zangetsu | WIN, NS, PS4 | | Dungeon crawl | KaeruPanda | PQube | |
| April 20 | The Mortuary Assistant | NS | | Horror | DarkStone Digital | DreadXP | |
| April 20 | Mr. Sun's Hatbox | WIN, NS | | Roguelike, Platformer | Kenny Sun | Raw Fury | |
| April 20 | Otxo | WIN | | Shoot 'em up | Lateralis Heavy Industries | Super Rare Originals | |
| April 20 | Outer Terror | WIN | | Action-adventure, Roguelike | Salt & Pixel | VoxPop Games | |
| April 20 | Stray Blade | WIN, PS5, XBX/S | | Action RPG | Point Blank | 505 Games | |
| April 20 | Super Meat Boy Forever | iOS, DROID | | Platformer | Team Meat | Thunderful | |
| April 20 | Tin Hearts | NS | | Adventure, Puzzle | Rogue Sun | Wired Productions | |
| April 21 | Advance Wars 1+2: Re-Boot Camp | NS | Compilation, Remake | TBS | WayForward | Nintendo | |
| April 21 | Dead Island 2 | WIN, PS4, PS5, XBO, XBX/S | | Action RPG | Dambuster Studios | Deep Silver | |
| April 21 | Homestead Arcana | WIN, XBX/S | | Farming | Serenity Forge | Skybound Games | |
| April 24 | Square Enix AI Tech Preview: The Portopia Serial Murder Case | WIN | | Adventure, Visual novel | Square Enix | | |
| April 25 | Afterimage | WIN, NS, PS4, PS5, XBO, XBX/S | | Metroidvania | Aurogon Shanghai | Modus Games | |
| April 25 | Amanda the Adventurer | WIN | | Horror | MangledMaw Games | DreadXP | |
| April 25 | The Centennial Case: A Shijima Story | iOS, DROID | | Adventure | h.a.n.d. | Square Enix | |
| April 25 | Desta: The Memories Between | WIN | | Adventure | Ustwo Games | | |
| April 25 | Fairy Fencer F: Refrain Chord | WIN, NS, PS4, PS5 | | Tactical RPG | Sting Entertainment, Compile Heart | Idea Factory | |
| April 25 | Magical Drop VI | WIN, NS | | Puzzle | Highball Games, Storm Trident | Forever Entertainment | |
| April 25 | R-Type Final 3 Evolved (NA) | PS5 | | Shoot 'em up | Granzella | NIS America | |
| April 25 | Roots of Pacha | WIN, OSX, LIN | | Simulation, RPG | Soda Den | | |
| April 25 | Stranded: Alien Dawn | WIN, PS4, PS5, XBO, XBX/S | | Survival, Simulation | Haemimont Games | Frontier Foundry | |
| April 25 | Strayed Lights | WIN, NS, PS4, PS5, XBO, XBX/S | | Action-adventure | Embers | | |
| April 25 | Trinity Trigger | WIN, NS, PS4, PS5 | | Action RPG | Three Rings | Xseed Games, Marvelous | |
| April 26 | Cassette Beasts | WIN | | RPG | Bytten Studio | Raw Fury | |
| April 26 | Desta: The Memories Between | NS | | Adventure | Ustwo Games | | |
| April 26 | Evil Dead: The Game – Game of the Year Edition | WIN, PS4, PS5, XBO, XBX/S | | Survival horror | Boss Team Games | Saber Interactive | |
| April 26 | Honkai: Star Rail | WIN, iOS, DROID | | RPG | HoYoverse | | |
| April 27 | Bramble: The Mountain King | WIN, NS, PS5, XBX/S | | Action-adventure | Dimfrost Studio | Merge Games | |
| April 27 | Carrion | PS5 | | Horror | Phobia Game Studio | Devolver Digital | |
| April 27 | Dungeon Drafters | WIN | | Roguelike, Dungeon crawl | Manalith Studios | Dangen Entertainment | |
| April 27 | Fantavision 202X | WIN | | Puzzle, Action | Cosmo Machia | | |
| April 27 | The Last Case of Benedict Fox | WIN, XBO, XBX/S | | Metroidvania | Plot Twist | Rogue Games | |
| April 27 | Lego Bricktales | iOS, DROID | | Puzzle, Adventure | ClockStone Studio | Thunderful Publishing | |
| April 27 | Live A Live | WIN, PS4, PS5 | | RPG | Historia | Square Enix | |
| April 27 | Mail Time | WIN | | Adventure | Appelmoes Games | Freedom Games | |
| April 27 | Mercenaries Lament: Requiem of the Silver Wolf | NS | | Tactical RPG | RideonJapan | Circle Entertainment | |
| April 27 | Mugen Souls | NS | | RPG | Compile Heart | Eastasiasoft | |
| April 27 | Night Crows | NS | | MMORPG | Madngine | WeMade Entertainment | |
| April 27 | Omega Strikers | WIN, NS, iOS, DROID | | Sports, Action | Odyssey Interactive | | |
| April 27 | Picross S9 | NS | | Puzzle | Jupiter | | |
| April 27 | Temirana: The Lucky Princess and the Tragic Knights (JP) | NS | | Visual novel | ichicolumn | Idea Factory | |
| April 27 | Ys Memoire: The Oath in Felghana (JP) | NS | | Action RPG | Nihon Falcom | | |
| April 28 | Deathwish Enforcers | NS, PS4 | | Action | Monster Bath Games | Limited Run Games | |
| April 28 | Minabo: A Walk Through Life | WIN, NS, PS4, PS5, XBO, XBX/S | | Social sim | DevilishGames | Selecta Play | |
| April 28 | R-Type Final 3 Evolved (EU) | PS5 | | Shoot 'em up | Granzella | NIS America | |
| April 28 | Star Wars Jedi: Survivor | WIN, PS5, XBX/S | | Action-adventure | Respawn Entertainment | Electronic Arts | |
| May 2 | Age of Wonders 4 | WIN, PS5, XBX/S | | TBS | Triumph Studios | Paradox Interactive | |
| May 2 | Laya's Horizon | iOS, DROID | | Action | Snowman | Netflix Games | |
| May 2 | Redfall | WIN, XBX/S | | Tactical shooter | Arkane Studios | Bethesda Softworks | |
| May 2 | Showgunners | WIN | | TBT | Artificer | Good Shepherd Entertainment | |
| May 4 | AFL 23 | WIN, PS4, PS5 | | Sports | Big Ant Studios | Nacon | |
| May 4 | The Dark Pictures Anthology: Man of Medan | NS | Port | Interactive drama, Survival horror | Supermassive Games | Bandai Namco Entertainment | |
| May 4 | Ravenlok | WIN, XBO, XBX/S | | Action-adventure | Cococucumber | | |
| May 5 | Death or Treat | WIN, PS5, XBX/S | | Roguelike, Hack and slash | Saona Studios | Perp Games | |
| May 5 | Hogwarts Legacy | PS4, XBO | Port | Action RPG | Avalanche Software | Warner Bros. Games | |
| May 5 | Idol Showdown | WIN | | Fighting | Besto Game Team/Games | | |
| May 8 | Darkest Dungeon II | WIN | | Dungeon crawl, Roguelike | Red Hook Studios | | |
| May 8 | Weird West: Definitive Edition | PS5, XBX/S | | Action RPG | WolfEye Studios | Devolver Digital | |
| May 9 | Dokapon Kingdom: Connect | NS | | RPG | Sting | Idea Factory | |
| May 9 | Torchlight: Infinite | iOS, DROID | | Action RPG, Hack and slash | XD Games | | |
| May 9 | Voidtrain | WIN | Early access | FPS, Survival | HypeTrain Digital | | |
| May 10 | The Lord of the Rings: Heroes of Middle-earth | iOS, DROID | | RPG | Capital Games | Electronic Arts | |
| May 11 | Another Fisherman's Tale | WIN, PS5, Quest | | Puzzle | InnerSpaceVR | Vertigo Games | |
| May 11 | Fuga: Melodies of Steel 2 | WIN, NS, PS4, PS5, XBO, XBX/S | | Tactical RPG | CyberConnect2 | | |
| May 11 | Gunvein | NS | | Shoot 'em up | NGDEV | | |
| May 11 | Marvel's Midnight Suns | PS4, XBO | | TBS | Firaxis Games | 2K | |
| May 11 | TT Isle Of Man: Ride On The Edge 3 | WIN, NS, PS4, PS5, XBO, XBX/S | | Racing | RaceWard Studio | Nacon | |
| May 12 | The Legend of Zelda: Tears of the Kingdom | NS | | Action-adventure | Nintendo EPD | Nintendo | |
| May 14 | Punishing: Gray Raven | WIN | | Action RPG, Hack and slash | Kuro Games | | |
| May 15 | Trackmania | PS4, PS5, XBO, XBX/S, Luna | | Racing | Nadeo | Ubisoft | |
| May 16 | Hrot | WIN | | FPS | Spytihněv | | |
| May 16 | Humanity | WIN, PS4, PS5 | | Puzzle | THA, Enhance | Enhance | |
| May 16 | Trinity Trigger (EU) | WIN, NS, PS4, PS5 | | Action RPG | Three Rings | Xseed Games, Marvelous Europe | |
| May 16 | Warlander | PS5, XBX/S | | MOBA | Toylogic | Plaion | |
| May 17 | Elypse | WIN | | Action, Platformer | Hot Chili Games | PID Games | |
| May 17 | World Championship Boxing Manager II | NS, PS4, XBO | | Simulation, Sports | Mega Cat Studios | Ziggurat Interactive | |
| May 18 | Eastern Exorcist | XBO | | Action RPG | Wildfire Game | Bilibili | |
| May 18 | Firmament | WIN | | Adventure | Cyan Worlds | | |
| May 18 | Supraland Six Inches Under | PS4, PS5, XBO, XBX/S | | Metroidvania | Supra Games | Humble Games | |
| May 18 | Winter's Wish: Spirits of Edo | NS | | Visual novel | Idea Factory | Aksys Games | |
| May 19 | Cyber Citizen Shockman | WIN, NS, PS4, PS5, XBO, XBX/S | | Platformer, Action | Masaya Games, Shinyuden | Ratalaika Games | |
| May 19 | Lego 2K Drive | WIN, NS, PS4, PS5, XBO, XBX/S | | Racing | Visual Concepts | 2K | |
| May 19 | Pocket Mirror: GoldenerTraum | WIN | | Horror, Adventure, RPG | AstralShift, Visustella | Degica Games | |
| May 19 | Tin Hearts | WIN, PS4, PS5, XBO, XBX/S | | Adventure, Puzzle | Rogue Sun | Wired Productions | |
| May 23 | After Us | WIN, PS5, XBX/S | | Platformer, Puzzle | Piccolo Studio | Private Division | |
| May 23 | Bread & Fred | WIN, OSX | | Platformer | SandCastles Studio | Apogee Entertainment | |
| May 23 | Convergence: A League of Legends Story | WIN, NS, PS4, PS5, XBO, XBX/S | | Action, Platformer | Double Stallion Games | Riot Forge | |
| May 23 | Farming Simulator 23 | NS, iOS, DROID | | Simulation | Giants Software | | |
| May 23 | Glitch Busters: Stuck on You | WIN, NS, PS4 | | TPS | Toylogic | Skybound Games | |
| May 23 | Miasma Chronicles | WIN, PS5, XBX/S | | Tactical RPG | The Bearded Ladies | 505 Games | |
| May 23 | Monster Menu: The Scavenger's Cookbook | NS, PS4, PS5 | | Strategy, RPG | Nippon Ichi Software | NIS America | |
| May 23 | Pawperty Damage | WIN, OSX, LIN | | Action, Sandbox | Dare Looks | | |
| May 23 | Planet of Lana | WIN, XBO, XBX/S | | Puzzle, Adventure | Wishfully | Thunderful Publishing | |
| May 23 | Puzzle Bobble Everybubble! | NS | | Puzzle | Taito | JP: Taito; WW: ININ Games | |
| May 23 | Star Trek: Resurgence | WIN, PS4, PS5, XBO, XBX/S | | Adventure | Dramatic Labs | Bruner House LLC | |
| May 23 | Warhammer 40,000: Boltgun | WIN, OSX, LIN, NS, PS4, PS5, XBO, XBX/S | | FPS | Auroch Digital | Focus Entertainment | |
| May 23 | World of Goo Remastered | iOS, DROID | | Puzzle | Tomorrow Corporation | Netflix Games | |
| May 24 | Beat Saber | PS5 | | Rhythm | Hyperbolic Magnetism | Beat Games | |
| May 24 | Only Up! | WIN | | Platformer | SCKR Games | | |
| May 24 | Sunshine Shuffle | WIN, NS | | Digital tabletop, Visual novel | Strange Scaffold | | |
| May 24 | Welcome Kokuri-san | WIN | | Visual novel | CyberStep | | |
| May 25 | Bat Boy | WIN, NS, PS4, PS5, XBO, XBX/S | | Action-adventure, Platformer | X Plus Company, Sonzai Games | X Plus Company | |
| May 25 | Batsugun Saturn Tribute Boosted | WIN, NS, PS4, XBO | | Bullet hell | City Connection | | |
| May 25 | The Case of the Golden Idol | NS | | Adventure | Color Gray Games | Playstack | |
| May 25 | Cassette Beasts | NS, XBO, XBX/S | | RPG | Bytten Studio | Raw Fury | |
| May 25 | Dynopunk | WIN | | Visual novel, Adventure | Tomato Fantasy Games | 101XP | |
| May 25 | Evil Wizard | WIN, XBO, XBX/S | | Action RPG | Rubber Duck Games | E-Home Entertainment | |
| May 25 | Fights in Tight Spaces | NS, PS4, PS5 | | Deck building (roguelike) | Ground Shatter | Mode 7 Games | |
| May 25 | Hello Neighbor VR: Search and Rescue | WIN, PS5, Quest | | Horror, Puzzle | Steel Wool Studios | tinyBuild | |
| May 25 | Kizuna AI: Touch the Beat! | WIN, NS, PS4 | | Rhythm | Gemdrops | | |
| May 25 | The Lord of the Rings: Gollum | WIN, PS4, PS5, XBO, XBX/S | | Action-adventure | Daedalic Entertainment | Daedalic Entertainment, Nacon | |
| May 25 | Maquette | NS | | Puzzle, Adventure | Graceful Decay | Annapurna Interactive | |
| May 25 | Nock | PS5 | | Sports | Normal VR | | |
| May 25 | Protodroid Delta | WIN, NS, PS4, XBO | | Action, Platformer | Adam Kareem | Humble Games | |
| May 25 | Shinobi non Grata | WIN | | Action | Studio PICO, Esquadra | Flyhigh Works | |
| May 25 | Welcome Kokuri-san | NS | | Visual novel | CyberStep | | |
| May 26 | Fitness Circuit | NS | | Fitness | Exfit, Jupiter | Spike Chunsoft | |
| May 26 | Monster Menu: The Scavenger's Cookbook (EU) | NS, PS4, PS5 | | Strategy, RPG | Nippon Ichi Software | | |
| May 26 | Super Mario Advance | NS | Port | Platformer | | | |
| May 26 | Super Mario World: Super Mario Advance 2 | NS | Port | Platformer | | | |
| May 26 | Yoshi's Island: Super Mario Advance 3 | NS | Port | Platformer | | | |
| May 30 | The Caligula Effect: Overdose (NA) | PS5 | | RPG | historia | NIS America | |
| May 30 | Chicory: A Colorful Tale | XBO, XBX/S | | Adventure | Greg Lobanov | Finji | |
| May 30 | Company of Heroes 3 | PS5, XBX/S | | RTS | Relic Entertainment | Sega | |
| May 30 | Everdream Valley | WIN, PS4, PS5 | | Farming | Mooneaters | Untold Tales | |
| May 30 | Farworld Pioneers | WIN, PS4, PS5, XBO, XBX/S | | Survival, Simulation | Igloosoft | tinyBuild | |
| May 30 | Friends vs Friends | WIN | | FPS, Deck building | Brainwash Gang | Raw Fury | |
| May 30 | Mobile Suit Gundam: Battle Operation 2 | WIN | | TPS | B.B. Studio | Bandai Namco Entertainment | |
| May 30 | Poly Bridge 3 | WIN, OSX, LIN | | Simulation, Puzzle | Dry Cactus | | |
| May 30 | Puzzle Quest 3 | PS4, PS5, XBO, XBX/S | | Puzzle, RPG | Infinity Plus Two | 505 Games | |
| May 30 | System Shock | WIN | Remake | Action-adventure | Nightdive Studios | Prime Matter | |
| May 30 | To Hell With The Ugly | WIN | | Adventure | La Poule Noire | ARTE France | |
| May 31 | Decarnation | WIN, NS | | Adventure, Horror | Atelier QDB | Shiro Unlimited | |
| May 31 | Doomblade | WIN | | Metroidvania | Muro Studios | Iceberg Interactive | |
| May 31 | Stasis: Bone Totem | WIN | | PCA | The Brotherhood | The Brotherhood, Feardemic | |
| May 31 | The Tartarus Key | WIN, NS, PS4, XBO, XBX/S | | Adventure, Horror | Vertical Reach | Armor Games Studios | |
| June 1 | Etrian Odyssey Origins Collection | WIN, NS | Compilation | RPG | Atlus | | |
| June 1 | Gunfire Reborn | PS4, PS5 | | Roguelike, FPS | Duoyi Games | 505 Games | |
| June 1 | Homebody | WIN, NS, PS4, PS5, XBO, XBX/S | | Survival horror, Puzzle | Game Grumps | Rogue Games | |
| June 1 | Killer Frequency | WIN, NS, PS4, PS5, XBO, XBX/S | | Horror | Team17 | | |
| June 1 | Loop8: Summer of Gods (JP) | NS, PS4, XBO | | RPG | Sieg Games | Marvelous | |
| June 1 | Skatebird | PS4, PS5 | | Sports | Glass Bottom Games | | |
| June 1 | Slayers X: Terminal Aftermath: Vengance of the Slayer | WIN, XBO, XBX/S | | FPS | Big Z Studios | No More Robots | |
| June 2 | The Caligula Effect: Overdose (EU) | PS5 | | RPG | historia | NIS America | |
| June 2 | Shantae | PS4, PS5 | Port | Platformer | WayForward | | |
| June 2 | Street Fighter 6 | WIN, PS4, PS5, XBX/S | | Fighting | Capcom | | |
| June 2 | Super Mega Baseball 4 | WIN, NS, PS4, PS5, XBO, XBX/S | | Sports | Metalhead Software | Electronic Arts | |
| June 2 | We Love Katamari Reroll+ Royal Reverie | WIN, NS, PS4, PS5, XBO, XBX/S | | Puzzle, Action | Bandai Namco Entertainment | | |
| June 5 | Blaster Master: Enemy Below | NS | | Metroidvania, Run and gun | | | |
| June 5 | Harvest Moon | NS | | Farming | | | |
| June 5 | Kirby Tilt 'n' Tumble | NS | | Action, Puzzle | | | |
| June 5 | Mystery Tower | NS | | Platformer, Puzzle | | | |
| June 6 | Amnesia: The Bunker | WIN, PS4, XBO, XBX/S | | Survival horror | Frictional Games | | |
| June 6 | Diablo IV | WIN, PS4, PS5, XBO, XBX/S | | Action RPG, Hack and slash | Blizzard Entertainment | | |
| June 6 | Loop8: Summer of Gods | WIN, NS, PS4, XBO | | RPG | Sieg Games | Marvelous | |
| June 6 | Payday: Crime War | iOS, DROID | Full release | FPS | Starbreeze Studios | PopReach | |
| June 6 | Raiden III x Mikado Maniax | WIN, NS, PS4, PS5, XBO, XBX/S | | Shoot 'em up | Moss | NIS America | |
| June 6 | Shovel Knight Pocket Dungeon | iOS, DROID | | Puzzle, Dungeon crawl | Yacht Club Games | Netflix Games | |
| June 7 | Nocturnal | WIN, NS, PS4, PS5, XBO, XBX/S | | Action-adventure | Sunnyside Games | Dear Villagers | |
| June 7 | Senses: Midnight | WIN, NS, PS4, PS5, XBO, XBX/S | | Survival horror | Suzaku Games | eastasiasoft | |
| June 7 | Terminal Velocity: Boosted Edition | PS4, XBO | | Shooter | Terminal Reality | Ziggurat Interactive | |
| June 8 | Bleak Sword DX | WIN, NS | | Action | more8bit | Devolver Digital | |
| June 8 | Eastern Exorcist | NS, PS4 | | Action RPG | Wildfire Game | Bilibili | |
| June 8 | Harmony: The Fall of Reverie | WIN, NS | | Narrative adventure | Dontnod Entertainment | | |
| June 8 | Mask of the Rose | WIN, OSX, LIN, NS | | Visual novel | Failbetter Games | | |
| June 8 | MotoGP 23 | WIN, NS, PS4, PS5, XBO, XBX/S | | Racing | Milestone | | |
| June 8 | Pro Cycling Manager 2023 | WIN, PS4, PS5, XBO, XBX/S | | Sports | Cyanide | Nacon | |
| June 8 | Telenet Shooting Collection (JP) | NS | | Shoot 'em up | Edia | | |
| June 8 | Tour de France 2023 | WIN, PS4, PS5, XBO, XBX/S | | Sports | Cyanide | Nacon | |
| June 9 | The Caligula Effect: Overdose (OC) | PS5 | | RPG | historia | NIS America | |
| June 9 | Greyhill Incident | WIN, PS4, PS5, XBX/S | | Survival horror | Refugium Games | Perp Games | |
| June 9 | Raiden III x Mikado Maniax (EU/OC) | WIN, NS, PS4, PS5, XBO, XBX/S | | Shoot 'em up | Moss | NIS America | |
| June 12 | Connections | WIN, iOS, DROID | | Word | The New York Times | | |
| June 12 | Rusted Moss | WIN | | Metroidvania | faxdoc, happysquared, sunnydaze | Playism | |
| June 13 | Dordogne | WIN, NS, PS4, PS5, XBO, XBX/S | | Adventure | Un Je Ne Sais Quoi | Focus Entertainment | |
| June 13 | Dragon Quest Champions (JP) | iOS, DROID | | RPG | Omega Force | Square Enix | |
| June 14 | Blue Protocol (JP) | WIN | | Action RPG | Bandai Namco Online | Amazon Games | |
| June 14 | Daydream: Forgotten Sorrow | WIN | | Action-adventure | Frozen Line | Ravenage | |
| June 15 | Birdie Wing: Golf Girls' Story | NS | | Sports | WOWWOW Technology | | |
| June 15 | Crime Boss: Rockay City | PS5, XBX/S | | FPS | Ingame Studios | 505 Games | |
| June 15 | Fall of Porcupine | WIN, NS, PS4, PS5, XBO, XBX/S | | Narrative adventure | Critical Rabbit | Assemble Entertainment | |
| June 15 | Jack Jeanne | NS | | Visual novel | Broccoli | | |
| June 15 | Layers of Fear | WIN, PS5, XBX/S | | Horror (psych) | Bloober Team | | |
| June 15 | Pixel Ripped 1978 | WIN, PS5, Quest | | Adventure | Arvore | Atari | |
| June 15 | Steel Assault | PS4, XBO | | Platformer | Zenovia | Tribute Games | |
| June 16 | Aimlabs | WIN | | FPS, TPS | State Space Labs | | |
| June 16 | Alchemic Cutie | NS, PS4, PS5 | | Life sim, RPG | Viridian Software, Vakio | PM Studios | |
| June 16 | F1 23 | WIN, PS4, PS5, XBO, XBX/S | | Racing | Codemasters | Electronic Arts | |
| June 16 | Jet Dragon | iOS | | Racing | Exfit, Jupiter Corporation | Spike Chunsoft | |
| June 16 | Park Beyond | WIN, PS5, XBX/S | | CMS | Limbic Entertainment | Bandai Namco Entertainment | |
| June 20 | Aliens: Dark Descent | WIN, PS4, PS5, XBO, XBX/S | | Action | Tindalos Interactive | Focus Entertainment | |
| June 20 | Crash Team Rumble | PS4, PS5, XBO, XBX/S | | MOBA | Toys for Bob | Activision | |
| June 20 | Rogue Legacy 2 | PS4, PS5 | | Platformer, Roguelike | Cellar Door Games | | |
| June 21 | Pikmin 1+2 | NS | Remaster | RTS | Nintendo EPD | Nintendo | |
| June 21 | Trepang2 | WIN | | FPS | Trepang Studios | Team17 | |
| June 22 | The Bookwalker: Thief of Tales | WIN, PS4, PS5, XBO, XBX/S | | Narrative adventure | Do My Best | tinyBuild | |
| June 22 | Dr. Fetus' Mean Meat Machine | WIN, NS, PS4, PS5, XBO, XBX/S | | Puzzle | Team Meat | Thunderful Games, Headup Games | |
| June 22 | Final Fantasy XVI | PS5 | | Action RPG | Square Enix | | |
| June 22 | Harmony: The Fall of Reverie | PS5, XBX/S | | Narrative adventure | Dontnod Entertainment | | |
| June 22 | Nimbus INFINITY | WIN | | Action, Fighting | GameCrafterTeam | GameTomo | |
| June 22 | Pretty Princess Magical Garden Island | NS | | Farming | Nippon Columbia | NA: Aksys Games; EU: Numskull Games | |
| June 22 | Tinkertown | WIN | | Sandbox, Adventure | Headup Games | | |
| June 22 | Valthirian Arc: Hero School Story 2 | WIN, NS, PS5, XBX/S | | Visual novel | Agate | PQube | |
| June 23 | C-Smash VRS | PS5 | | Rhythm, Sports | Wolf & Wood | RapidEyeMovers | |
| June 23 | Everdream Valley | NS | | Farming | Mooneaters | Untold Tales | |
| June 23 | Fire Emblem | NS | Port | Tactical RPG | | | |
| June 23 | Fire Emblem: Fūin no Tsurugi (JP) | NS | Port | Tactical RPG | | | |
| June 23 | Sonic Origins Plus | WIN, NS, PS4, PS5, XBO, XBX/S | Expansion | Platformer | Sonic Team | Sega | |
| June 26 | Kingdom Eighties: Summer of Greed | WIN | | Strategy | Fury Studios | Raw Fury | |
| June 26 | Temtem: Showdown | WIN | | RPG | Crema | Humble Games | |
| June 27 | Charade Maniacs | NS | | Dating sim, Narrative adventure | Idea Factory | | |
| June 27 | Destroy All Humans! 2: Reprobed | PS4, XBO | | Action-adventure | Black Forest Games | THQ Nordic | |
| June 27 | F.I.S.T.: Forged In Shadow Torch | XBX/S | | Metroidvania | TiGames | Bilibili | |
| June 27 | Sludge Life 2 | WIN | | FPS, Sandbox | Doseone, Terri Vellmann | Devolver Digital | |
| June 27 | Soulvars | WIN, NS, PS4, PS5, XBO, XBX/S | | RPG, Deck building | ginolabo | Shueisha Games | |
| June 27 | Story of Seasons: A Wonderful Life | WIN, NS, PS5, XBX/S | | Simulation, RPG | Marvelous | Xseed Games | |
| June 28 | Crusader of Centy/Soleil | NS | | Action-adventure | | | |
| June 28 | Dave the Diver | WIN | | Fishing, Adventure | Mintrocket | | |
| June 28 | Ghouls 'n Ghosts | NS | Port | Platformer | | | |
| June 28 | Landstalker | NS | Port | Action-adventure, RPG | | | |
| June 28 | The Revenge of Shinobi | NS | Port | Hack and slash, Platformer | | | |
| June 28 | SlavicPunk: Oldtimer | WIN | | Action | Red Square Games | | |
| June 29 | 9 R.I.P. (JP) | NS | | Visual novel | Otomate | Idea Factory | |
| June 29 | AEW Fight Forever | WIN, NS, PS4, PS5, XBO, XBX/S | | Sports | Yuke's | THQ Nordic | |
| June 29 | Enclave HD | NS, PS4, XBO | | Action-adventure | Sickhead Games | Ziggurat Interactive | |
| June 29 | Ketsugō Danshi: Elements with Emotions (JP) | NS | | Adventure | Square Enix | | |
| June 29 | The Lara Croft Collection | NS | | Action-adventure | Crystal Dynamics | Feral Interactive | |
| June 29 | McPixel 3 | iOS, DROID | | Puzzle | Sos Sosowski | Devolver Digital | |
| June 29 | Mundaun | PS5, XBX/S | | FPS, Horror | Hidden Fields | Annapurna Interactive | |
| June 29 | NeverAwake | XBX/S | | Shoot 'em up | Neotro | Phoenixx | |
| June 29 | Noob: The Factionless | WIN, NS, PS4, PS5, XBO, XBX/S | | RPG | Olydri Games | Microids | |
| June 29 | The Quintessential Quintuplets: Gotopazu Story (JP) | NS, PS4 | | Visual novel | Mages | | |
| June 29 | The Testament of Sherlock Holmes | PS4 | | Adventure | Frogwares | | |
| June 29 | Tokyo Xanadu eX+ (JP) | NS | | Action RPG | Nihon Falcom | | |
| June 29 | Xicatrice (JP) | NS, PS4, PS5 | | RPG | Nippon Ichi Software | | |
| June 30 | Crime O'Clock | WIN, NS | | Hidden object, Adventure | Bad Seed | Just For Games | |
| June 30 | Everybody 1-2-Switch! | NS | | Party | Nintendo EPD | Nintendo | |
| June 30 | Front Mission 1st: Remake | WIN, PS4, PS5, XBO, XBX/S | | Tactical RPG | MegaPixel Studio | Forever Entertainment | |
| June 30 | Ghost Trick: Phantom Detective | WIN, NS, PS4, XBO | Remaster | Adventure, Puzzle | Capcom | | |
| June 30 | Goodbye World | PS4, PS5, XBO, XBX/S | | Puzzle, Adventure | Isolation Studio | PM Studios | |
| June 30 | Master Detective Archives: Rain Code | NS | | Adventure | Too Kyo Games, Spike Chunsoft | Spike Chunsoft | |
| June 30 | Ray'z Arcade Chronology | NS, PS4 | | Shoot 'em up | M2 | Taito | |
| June 30 | RayStorm x RayCrisis HD | NS, PS4 | | Shoot 'em up | M2 | Taito, ININ Games | |

=== July–September ===
| Release date | Title | Platform | Type | Genre | Developer | Publisher | Ref. |
|---|---|---|---|---|---|---|---|
| July 4 | The Settlers: New Allies | NS, PS4, XBO | | Strategy | Ubisoft Blue Byte | Ubisoft | |
| July 4 | Synapse | PS5 | | Action, FPS | nDreams | | |
| July 6 | Gimmick! Special Edition | WIN, NS, PS4, XBO | | Platformer | Bitwave Games, Sunsoft | Bitwave Games | |
| July 6 | Gylt | WIN, PS4, PS5, XBO, XBX/S | | Survival horror | Tequila Works | | |
| July 6 | Necrosmith | NS, PS5 | | Action, Roguelike | Alawar | Merge Games | |
| July 6 | Scarf | PS4, PS5, XBO, XBX/S | | Platformer | Uprising Studios | HandyGames | |
| July 6 | Sentimental Death Loop | NS | | Adventure | Qureate | | |
| July 7 | Death or Treat | PS4 | | Roguelike, Hack and slash | Saona Studios | Perp Games | |
| July 7 | The Legend of Heroes: Trails into Reverie | WIN, NS, PS4, PS5 | | RPG | Nihon Falcom | NIS America | |
| July 11 | Axiom Verge 2 | XBO | | Metroidvania | Thomas Happ Games | | |
| July 11 | Rain World | PS5, XBO, XBX/S | | Platformer | Videocult | Akupara Games | |
| July 11 | The Valiant | PS5, XBX/S | | RTS | Kite Games | THQ Nordic | |
| July 12 | Bugsnax | iOS | Port | Adventure | Young Horses | | |
| July 12 | Death or Treat | NS | | Roguelike, Hack and slash | Saona Studios | Perp Games | |
| July 12 | Lost in Play | iOS, DROID | | Adventure, Puzzle | Happy Juice Games | Snapbreak Games | |
| July 12 | Mordhau | PS4, PS5, XBO, XBX/S | | Fighting, Hack and slash | Triternion | | |
| July 12 | Oxenfree II: Lost Signals | WIN, NS, PS4, PS5 | | Graphic adventure | Night School Studio | | |
| July 13 | Atelier Marie: The Alchemist of Salburg – Remake | WIN, NS, PS4, PS5 | | RPG | Gust | Koei Tecmo | |
| July 13 | Dyschronia: Chronos Alternate Episode III | PS5, Quest | | Adventure | IzanagiGames, MyDearest | | |
| July 13 | Ed-0: Zombie Uprising | WIN, PS5, XBX/S | | Roguelike | Lancarse | D3 Publisher | |
| July 13 | Gravity Circuit | WIN, NS, PS4, PS5 | | Action, Platformer | Domesticated Ant Games | PID Games | |
| July 13 | Manic Mechanics | NS | | Action, Party | 4J Studios | | |
| July 13 | Naraka: Bladepoint | PS5 | | Action-adventure | 24 Entertainment | NetEase Games | |
| July 13 | Operation Wolf Returns: First Mission VR | WIN, PS5, Quest, PICO4 | | Shoot 'em up (rail) | Virtuallyz Gaming | Microids | |
| July 13 | Sonic Prime Dash | iOS, DROID | | Endless runner | Hardlight | Sega | |
| July 13 | Touhou: New World | WIN, NS | | Bullet hell, Action RPG | Ankake Spa | Xseed Games | |
| July 14 | Dragon Quest Treasures | WIN | | Action RPG | Tose | Square Enix | |
| July 14 | Exoprimal | WIN, PS4, PS5, XBO, XBX/S | | TPS | Capcom | | |
| July 14 | Invector: Rhythm Galaxy | WIN | | Rhythm | Hello There Games | Warner Music Group | |
| July 14 | Jagged Alliance 3 | WIN | | Tactical RPG, TBT | Haemimont Games | THQ Nordic | |
| July 17 | Pokémon Sleep (OC) | iOS, DROID | | Simulation | Select Button | The Pokémon Company | |
| July 18 | Ember Knights | NS | | Roguelike | Doom Turtle | Twin Sails Interactive | |
| July 18 | Lisa: Definitive Edition | WIN, NS, PS4, PS5, XBO, XBX/S | | RPG | Dingaling Productions | Serenity Forge | |
| July 18 | My Friendly Neighborhood | WIN | | Survival horror | Evan Szymanski, John Szymanski | DreadXP | |
| July 18 | Pokémon Sleep (EU) | iOS, DROID | | Simulation | Select Button | The Pokémon Company | |
| July 18 | Roto Force | WIN, OSX, LIN, iOS, DROID | | Shoot 'em up (twin-stick) | Accidentally Awesome | PID Games, East2West Games | |
| July 18 | Space Invaders: World Defense | iOS, DROID | | AR | Google, Taito | Square Enix, Taito | |
| July 18 | Viewfinder | WIN, PS5 | | Shoot 'em up (rail) | Sad Owl Studios | Thunderful Games | |
| July 19 | Maquette | XBO, XBX/S | | Puzzle, Adventure | Graceful Decay | Annapurna Interactive | |
| July 19 | Pokémon Sleep (NA/JP) | iOS, DROID | | Simulation | Select Button | The Pokémon Company | |
| July 20 | Cross Tails | WIN, NS, PS4, PS5, XBO, XBX/S | | Strategy, RPG | RideonJapan | Kemco | |
| July 20 | Killsquad | PS4, PS5 | | Action RPG | Novarama | | |
| July 20 | Mahokenshi | OSX | | Strategy, Deck building | Game Source Studio | Iceberg Interactive | |
| July 20 | Might & Magic: Clash of Heroes - Definitive Edition | WIN, NS, PS4 | | Puzzle, Adventure, RPG | Dotemu | | |
| July 20 | Nobunaga's Ambition: Awakening | WIN, NS, PS4 | | TBS | Koei Tecmo | | |
| July 20 | Oaken | WIN, NS, PS4, PS5, XBO, XBX/S | | Deck building (roguelike) | Laki Studios | Goblinz Publishing, Red Art Games | |
| July 20 | Punch Club 2: Fast Forward | WIN, NS, PS4, PS5, XBO, XBX/S | | Sports management | Lazy Bear Games | tinyBuild | |
| July 20 | Sailing Era | NS, PS4, PS5 | | Simulation, RPG | Gy Games | Bilibili | |
| July 20 | The Spirit and the Mouse | PS4, PS5 | | Adventure | Alblune | Armor Games Studios | |
| July 20 | Whispike Survivors: Sword of the Necromancer | WIN, NS, PS4, PS5 | | Bullet heaven, Farming | Grimorio of Games | | |
| July 20 | Yeah! You Want "Those Games," Right? So Here You Go! Now, Let's See You Clear Them! | WIN, NS | | Casual | Monkeycraft | D3 Publisher | |
| July 21 | The Ninja Saviors: Return of the Warriors | WIN | | Brawler | Tengo Project | Taito | |
| July 21 | Pikmin 4 | NS | | RTS | Nintendo EPD | Nintendo | |
| July 21 | Sephonie | NS, PS4, PS5, XBO, XBX/S | | Platformer | Analgesic Productions | Ratalaika Games | |
| July 22 | High on Life | PS4, PS5 | | FPS | Squanch Games | | |
| July 24 | Tangledeep | PS4 | | Dungeon crawl | Impact GameWorks | | |
| July 25 | The Banished Vault | WIN, OSX | | TBS | Lunar Division | Bithell Games | |
| July 25 | Mr. Run and Jump | WIN, NS, PS4, PS5, XBO, XBX/S, ATRVCS | | Platformer, Action | Graphite Lab | Atari | |
| July 25 | The Queen's Gambit Chess | iOS, DROID | | Digital tabletop | Ripstone Rockwater | Netflix Games | |
| July 25 | Remnant 2 | WIN, PS5, XBX/S | | TPS | Gunfire Games | Gearbox Publishing San Francisco | |
| July 25 | This Way Madness Lies | NS | | RPG | Zeboyd Games | | |
| July 26 | Great Ambition of the SLIMES | WIN | | Tactical RPG | Altair Works | Flyhigh Works | |
| July 26 | Ratchet & Clank: Rift Apart | WIN | Port | TPS, Platformer | Insomniac Games, Nixxes Software | Sony Interactive Entertainment | |
| July 26 | Xuan-Yuan Sword: Mists Beyond the Mountains | WIN | | RPG | Softstar | Gamera Games, eastasiasoft | |
| July 27 | Arcadian Atlas | WIN | | Tactical RPG | Twin Otter Studios | Serenity Forge | |
| July 27 | Crymachina (JP) | NS, PS4, PS5 | | Action RPG | Aquria | FuRyu | |
| July 27 | Double Dragon Gaiden: Rise of the Dragons | WIN, NS, PS4, PS5, XBO, XBX/S | | Brawler | Secret Base | Modus Games | |
| July 27 | The Expanse: A Telltale Series Episode 1 | WIN, PS4, PS5, XBO, XBX/S | | Graphic adventure | Telltale Games, Deck Nine | Telltale Games | |
| July 27 | Koa and the Five Pirates of Mara | WIN, NS, PS4, PS5, XBO, XBX/S | | Action-adventure, Platformer | Chibig, Talpa Games, Undercoders | Chibig | |
| July 27 | The Legend of Zelda: Oracle of Ages | NS | Port | Action-adventure | | | |
| July 27 | The Legend of Zelda: Oracle of Seasons | NS | Port | Action-adventure | | | |
| July 27 | Let's School | WIN | | CMS | Pathea Games | PM Studios | |
| July 27 | Nova Strike | WIN, NS, PS5, XBX/S | | Shoot 'em up | Sanuk Games | Nacon | |
| July 27 | PixelJunk Scrappers Deluxe | WIN, NS, PS4, PS5 | | Party, Brawler | Q-Games | | |
| July 27 | Psychic 5 Eternal | NS | | Action | CRT Games | City Connection | |
| July 27 | Puzzles for Clef | WIN | | Puzzle-platformer | Weasel Token | Freedom Games | |
| July 27 | Radiant Tale | NS | | Visual novel | Design Factory | Aksys Games | |
| July 27 | Return to Monkey Island | iOS, DROID | Port | Graphic adventure | Terrible Toybox | Devolver Digital | |
| July 27 | Sword and Fairy Inn 2 | NS | | Life sim | Softstar, CubeGame | Softstar, eastasiasoft | |
| July 27 | Yggdra Union: We'll Never Fight Alone | WIN, NS | Port | Tactical RPG | Sting Entertainment | | |
| July 28 | Disney Illusion Island | NS | | Platformer | Dlala Studios | Disney Interactive | |
| July 28 | Hello Kitty Island Adventure | iOS, DROID | | Life sim | Sunblink | | |
| July 28 | Natsu-Mon! 20th Century Summer Vacation (JP) | NS | | Adventure | Millennium Kitchen, Toybox | Spike Chunsoft | |
| July 28 | Pseudoregalia | WIN | | Metroidvania, Platformer | rittzler | | |
| July 31 | F1 Manager 2023 | WIN, PS4, PS5, XBO, XBX/S | | Business sim | Frontier Developments | | |
| July 31 | Rise of the Triad: Ludicrous Edition | WIN | | FPS | Nightdive Studios | Apogee Entertainment, New Blood Interactive | |
| July 31 | Venba | WIN, NS, PS5, XBO, XBX/S | | Cooking | Visai Games | | |
| August 1 | Akiba's Trip: Undead & Undressed – Director's Cut | WIN, NS, PS4 | Remaster | Action-adventure, Brawler | Acquire | | |
| August 1 | Cut the Rope Daily | iOS, DROID | | Simulation | ZeptoLab | Netflix Games | |
| August 2 | Elypse | NS, PS5 | | Action, Platformer | Hot Chili Games | PID Games | |
| August 2 | Ninja or Die: Shadow of the Sun | WIN | | Roguelike | Nao Games | Marvelous | |
| August 2 | Oceanhorn 2: Knights of the Lost Realm | WIN, PS5, XBX/S | | Action RPG | Comfox & Bros | Fireplace Games | |
| August 3 | Adore | WIN, NS, PS4, PS5, XBO, XBX/S | | Action | Cadabra Games | QuByte | |
| August 3 | Baldur's Gate 3 | WIN | | RPG | Larian Studios | | |
| August 3 | Flutter Away | WIN, NS | | Adventure | Runaway Play | | |
| August 3 | A Guidebook of Babel | WIN, NS | | Adventure | StarryStarry | | |
| August 3 | Whispike Survivors: Sword of the Necromancer | XBO, XBX/S | | Bullet heaven, Farming | Grimorio of Games | | |
| August 5 | Paper Trail | WIN, NS | | Puzzle | Newfangled Games | | |
| August 7 | Videoverse | WIN, OSX, LIN | | Narrative adventure | Kinmoku | | |
| August 8 | Deathbulge: Battle of the Bands | WIN, OSX, LIN | Original | RPG | Deathbulge, Five Houses LLC | | |
| August 8 | Pokémon Stadium 2 | NS | Port | TBS, Party | | | |
| August 8 | Pokémon Trading Card Game | NS | Port | DCCG | | | |
| August 8 | Tower of Fantasy | PS4, PS5 | | Action RPG | Hotta Studio | Perfect World | |
| August 9 | 30XX | WIN, NS | | Roguelike, Action, Platformer | Batterystaple Games | | |
| August 10 | Atlas Fallen | WIN, PS5, XBX/S | | Action RPG | Deck13 Interactive | Focus Entertainment | |
| August 10 | Banchou Tactics | WIN | | Tactical RPG | Secret Character, Itsaraamata | Flyhigh Works | |
| August 10 | Bokura | WIN, NS, iOS, DROID | | Puzzle, Adventure | Tokoronyori | Kodansha | |
| August 10 | The Dragoness: Command of the Flame | PS4, PS5, XBX/S | | Tactical RPG | Crazy Goat Games | PQube | |
| August 10 | Hyperdimension Neptunia: Sisters vs. Sisters (JP) | NS | Port | RPG | Compile Heart | | |
| August 10 | Lifeless Moon | WIN | | Adventure, Puzzle | Stage 2 Studios | Serenity Forge | |
| August 10 | Neptunia Game Maker R:Evolution (JP) | NS, PS4, PS5 | | RPG | Compile Heart | | |
| August 10 | Overwatch 2 | WIN, NS, PS4, PS5, XBO, XBX/S | | FPS | Blizzard Entertainment | | |
| August 10 | Pups & Purrs Pet Shop | NS | | Simulation | Nippon Columbia | Aksys Games | |
| August 10 | Quake II - Enhanced Edition | WIN, NS, PS4, PS5, XBO, XBX/S | | FPS | Nightdive Studios, id Software, MachineGames | Bethesda Softworks | |
| August 10 | Stray | XBO, XBX/S | | Adventure | BlueTwelve Studio | Annapurna Interactive | |
| August 10 | Stray Gods: The Roleplaying Musical | WIN, NS, PS4, PS5, XBO, XBX/S | | Narrative adventure, RPG, Music | Summerfall Studios | Humble Games | |
| August 11 | Dead Cells | PS5 | | Metroidvania | Motion Twin, Evil Empire | Motion Twin | |
| August 11 | Rainbow Skies | NS | | Strategy, RPG | SideQuest Studios | eastasiasoft | |
| August 13 | Touhou Juuouen 〜 Unfinished Dream of All Living Ghost | WIN | | Shoot 'em up | Team Shanghai Alice | Mediascape | |
| August 15 | Black Skylands | WIN, NS, PS4, PS5, XBO, XBX/S | | Action-adventure | Hungry Couch | tinyBuild | |
| August 15 | Everspace 2 | PS5, XBX/S | | Vehicle sim (spaceship), Roguelike | Rockfish Games | | |
| August 15 | Hammerwatch 2 | WIN | | Hack and slash, Action RPG | Crackshell | Modus Games | |
| August 15 | Moving Out 2 | WIN, NS, PS4, PS5, XBO, XBX/S | | Puzzle, Action | SMG Studio, DevM Games | Team17 | |
| August 16 | The Cosmic Wheel Sisterhood | WIN, NS | | Adventure | Deconstructeam | Devolver Digital | |
| August 16 | En Garde | WIN | | Action | Fireplace Games | | |
| August 16 | Iron Danger | PS5, XBX/S | | Action RPG | Action Squad Studios | Daedalic Entertainment | |
| August 17 | Affogato | WIN | | Tower defense, RPG | Befun Studio | Spiral Up Games | |
| August 17 | Gord | WIN, PS5, XBX/S | | Strategy | Covenant.dev | Team17 | |
| August 17 | Hello Engineer | WIN, NS, PS4, PS5, XBO, XBX/S | | Sandbox | tinyBuild Riga | tinyBuild | |
| August 17 | Kentucky Route Zero: TV Edition | PS5, XBX/S | | Adventure | Cardboard Computer | Annapurna Interactive | |
| August 17 | Marble It Up! Ultra | WIN, NS, PS4, PS5, XBO, XBX/S | | Platformer | The Marble Collective | | |
| August 17 | Red Dead Redemption | NS, PS4 | Port | Action-adventure | Rockstar San Diego, Double Eleven | Rockstar Games | |
| August 17 | Shadow Gambit: The Cursed Crew | WIN, PS5, XBX/S | | Stealth, Strategy | Mimimi Games | | |
| August 17 | Shinobi non Grata | NS, PS4, XBO | | Action | Studio PICO, Esquadra | Flyhigh Works | |
| August 17 | Vampire Survivors | NS | | Roguelike, Shoot 'em up | poncle | | |
| August 18 | Bomb Rush Cyberfunk | WIN, NS | Port | Action, Platformer | Team Reptile | | |
| August 18 | Madden NFL 24 | WIN, PS4, PS5, XBO, XBX/S | | Sports | EA Tiburon | EA Sports | |
| August 18 | The Texas Chain Saw Massacre | WIN, PS4, PS5, XBO, XBX/S | | Survival horror | Sumo Nottingham | Gun Interactive | |
| August 21 | Kill The Crows | WIN, OSX | | Arena shooter | 5minlab | | |
| August 22 | Age of Empires IV | XBO, XBX/S | | RTS | Relic Entertainment, World's Edge | Xbox Game Studios | |
| August 22 | Fort Solis | WIN, OSX, PS5 | | Horror, Adventure | Fallen Leaf, Black Drakkar Games | Dear Villagers | |
| August 22 | Humankind | PS4, PS5, XBO, XBX/S | | 4X | Amplitude Studios | Sega | |
| August 22 | Immortals of Aveum | WIN, PS5, XBX/S | | FPS | Ascendant Studios | Electronic Arts | |
| August 22 | Marvel Snap | WIN | | DCCG | Second Dinner | Nuverse | |
| August 22 | Smurfs Kart | WIN, PS4, PS5, XBO, XBX/S | | Racing (kart) | Eden Games | Microids | |
| August 22 | WrestleQuest | WIN, NS, PS4, PS5, XBO, XBX/S, iOS, DROID | | Action RPG | Mega Cat Studios | Skybound Games | |
| August 23 | Sprawl | WIN | | FPS | Maeth | Rogue Games | |
| August 24 | Blasphemous 2 | WIN, NS, PS5, XBX/S | | Metroidvania | The Game Kitchen | Team17 | |
| August 24 | D.C. III P.S. ~Da Capo III~ Plus Story | NS, PS4 | | Visual novel | Circus | Entergram | |
| August 24 | Firewall Ultra | PS5 | | FPS | First Contact Entertainment | Sony Interactive Entertainment | |
| August 24 | Lost Eidolons | PS5, XBX/S | | Tactical RPG | Ocean Drive Studio | | |
| August 24 | Mediterranea Inferno | WIN | | Visual novel | Eyeguys | Santa Ragione | |
| August 24 | Norn9: Last Era | NS | | Visual novel | Regista | Aksys Games | |
| August 24 | Retro Revengers | WIN, NS | | Platformer | Alex | Shinyuden | |
| August 24 | Ride 5 | WIN, PS5, XBX/S | | Racing | Milestone | | |
| August 24 | Toaplan Arcade Shoot 'Em Up Collection Vol. 2 | WIN, OSX, LIN | | Shoot 'em up | Bitwave Games | | |
| August 24 | Unpacking | iOS, DROID | | Puzzle | Witch Beam | Humble Games | |
| August 25 | Armored Core VI: Fires of Rubicon | WIN, PS4, PS5, XBO, XBX/S | | Action-adventure, Simulation | FromSoftware | Bandai Namco Entertainment | |
| August 28 | Untamed Tactics | WIN | | Tactical RPG | Grumpy Owl Games | Ravenage | |
| August 29 | Crossfire: Sierra Squad | WIN, PS5 | | FPS | Smilegate | | |
| August 29 | Goodbye Volcano High | WIN, PS4, PS5 | | Narrative adventure | KO OP | | |
| August 29 | The Making of Karateka | WIN, NS, PS4, PS5, XBO, XBX/S | | Action | Digital Eclipse | | |
| August 29 | Rhapsody: Marl Kingdom Chronicles (NA) | WIN, NS, PS5 | | RPG | Nippon Ichi Software | | |
| August 29 | Samba de Amigo: Party Central | NS | | Rhythm | Sega | | |
| August 29 | Samba de Amigo: Party-To-Go | iOS | | Rhythm | Sega | | |
| August 29 | Samurai Shodown | iOS, DROID | Port | Fighting | SNK | Netflix Games | |
| August 29 | Sea of Stars | WIN, NS, PS4, PS5, XBO, XBX/S | | RPG | Sabotage Studio | | |
| August 29 | Under the Waves | WIN, PS4, PS5, XBO, XBX/S | | Adventure | Parallel Studio | Quantic Dream | |
| August 30 | The Bridge Curse: Road to Salvation | NS, PS4, PS5, XBO, XBX/S | | Horror | Softstar | eastasiasoft | |
| August 30 | Call of the Wild: The Angler | PS4, PS5, XBO, XBX/S | | Simulation | Expansive Worlds | | |
| August 30 | Daymare: 1994 Sandcastle | WIN, PS4, PS5, XBO, XBX/S | | Survival horror | Invader Studios | Leonardo Interactive | |
| August 30 | Excitebike 64 | NS | Port | Racing | | | |
| August 31 | The Big Con | PS4, PS5 | | Adventure | Mighty Yell | Skybound Games | |
| August 31 | Gourmet Warriors | NS, PS4, XBO | | Brawler | QUByte Interactive | | |
| August 31 | Ou | WIN, NS | | Adventure | room6, G-Mode | G-Mode | |
| August 31 | Pocket Bravery | WIN, NS, PS4, PS5, XBO, XBX/S | | Fighting | Statera Studio | PQube | |
| August 31 | Somerville | PS4, PS5 | | Adventure | Jumpship | | |
| August 31 | Taito Milestones 2 | NS | | —N/a | Hamster Corporation | Taito | |
| August 31 | Tenebris Pictura | WIN, PS4, PS5, XBO, XBX/S | | Action-adventure | Pentadimensional Games | | |
| August 31 | Trine 5: A Clockwork Conspiracy | WIN, NS, PS4, PS5, XBO, XBX/S | | Puzzle-platformer, Action-adventure | Frozenbyte | THQ Nordic | |
| September 1 | Bomb Rush Cyberfunk | PS4, PS5, XBO, XBX/S | | Action, Platformer | Team Reptile | | |
| September 1 | Borderlands Collection: Pandora's Box | WIN, PS4, PS5, XBO, XBX/S | | —N/a | Gearbox Software | 2K | |
| September 1 | Mega Man X DiVE Offline | WIN, iOS, DROID | Full release | Action RPG | Capcom | | |
| September 1 | Rhapsody: Marl Kingdom Chronicles (EU) | WIN, NS, PS5 | | RPG | Nippon Ichi Software | | |
| September 1 | Usagi Shima | iOS, DROID | | Virtual pet | pank0 | | |
| September 1 | Void Stranger | WIN | | Puzzle | System Erasure | | |
| September 5 | Chants of Sennaar | WIN, NS, PS4, PS5 | | Puzzle, Adventure | Rundisc | Focus Entertainment | |
| September 5 | Enchanted Portals | WIN | | Platformer | Xixo Games Studio | | |
| September 5 | Monochrome Mobius: Rights and Wrongs Forgotten | PS4, PS5 | | RPG | Aquaplus, Design Act | NIS America | |
| September 5 | Rune Factory 3 Special | WIN, NS | | Simulation, RPG | Marvelous | Xseed Games | |
| September 5 | Totally Accurate Battle Simulator | PS4 | | Strategy | Landfall | | |
| September 6 | Baldur's Gate 3 | PS5 | | RPG | Larian Studios | | |
| September 6 | Downtown Nekketsu March: Super-Awesome Field Day! | NS | | Action, Sports | | | |
| September 6 | Joy Mech Fight | NS | Port | Fighting | | | |
| September 6 | Kirby's Star Stacker (SNES) | NS | Port | Puzzle | | | |
| September 6 | Quest for Camelot | NS | | Action RPG | | | |
| September 6 | Raindrop Sprinters | NS | | Action | room_909 | Mediascape Co. Ltd. | |
| September 6 | Starfield | WIN, XBX/S | | Action RPG | Bethesda Game Studios | Bethesda Softworks | |
| September 7 | Dokapon Kingdom: Connect | WIN | | RPG | Sting | Idea Factory | |
| September 7 | The Dragoness: Command of the Flame | NS | | Tactical RPG | Crazy Goat Games | PQube | |
| September 7 | Final Fantasy VII: Ever Crisis | iOS, DROID | | Action RPG | Applibot | Square Enix | |
| September 7 | King's Bounty II | PS5, XBX/S | | RPG | Fulqrum Games | Prime Matter | |
| September 7 | The Many Pieces of Mr. Coo | WIN, NS, PS4, PS5, XBO, XBX/S | | PCA | Gammera Nest | Meridiem Games, Astrolabe Games | |
| September 7 | The Quintessential Quintuplets: Five Promises Made with Her (JP) | NS, PS4 | | Visual novel | Mages | | |
| September 7 | Rugby 24 | WIN, PS4, PS5, XBO, XBX/S | | Sports | Big Ant Studios | Nacon | |
| September 7 | Warstride Challenges | WIN, PS5, XBX/S | | FPS | Dream Powered Games | Focus Entertainment | |
| September 8 | Anonymous;Code | WIN, NS, PS4 | | Visual novel | Mages | Spike Chunsoft | |
| September 8 | Fae Farm | WIN, NS | | Action RPG | Phoenix Labs | | |
| September 8 | Monochrome Mobius: Rights and Wrongs Forgotten (EU/OC) | PS4, PS5 | | RPG | Aquaplus, Design Act | NIS America | |
| September 8 | NBA 2K24 | WIN, NS, PS4, PS5, XBO, XBX/S | | Sports | Visual Concepts | 2K | |
| September 8 | Rhapsody: Marl Kingdom Chronicles (OC) | WIN, NS, PS5 | | RPG | Nippon Ichi Software | | |
| September 8 | Synced | WIN | | TPS | NExT Studios | Level Infinite | |
| September 9 | Amatsu Sora ni Saku (JP) | WIN | | Visual novel | studio aila | | |
| September 12 | Eternights | WIN, PS5, PS4 | | Hack and slash, Dating sim | Studio Sai | | |
| September 12 | Mary Skelter Finale | WIN | | RPG, Dungeon crawl | Compile Heart | Idea Factory | |
| September 12 | MythForce | WIN, NS, PS4, PS5, XBO, XBX/S | | Action RPG | Beamdog | Aspyr | |
| September 12 | Nour: Play with Your Food | WIN, PS4, PS5 | | Art | Terrifying Jellyfish | Panic | |
| September 12 | Touhou: New World | PS4, PS5 | | Bullet hell, Action RPG | Ankake Spa | Xseed Games | |
| September 13 | Gunbrella | WIN, NS | | Action-adventure, Platformer | Doinksoft | Devolver Digital | |
| September 13 | Super Bomberman R 2 | WIN, NS, PS4, PS5, XBO, XBX/S | | Action | HexaDrive | Konami | |
| September 14 | Ad Infinitum | WIN, PS5, XBX/S | | Survival horror | Hekate | Nacon | |
| September 14 | AK-xolotl | WIN, NS, PS4, PS5, XBO, XBX/S | | Roguelike, Bullet hell | 2Awesome Studio | Playstack | |
| September 14 | Baten Kaitos I & II HD Remaster | NS | | RPG | Monolith Soft | Bandai Namco Entertainment | |
| September 14 | The Crew Motorfest | WIN, PS4, PS5, XBO, XBX/S | | Racing | Ubisoft Ivory Tower | Ubisoft | |
| September 14 | Dune: Spice Wars | WIN | | RTS | Shiro Games | Funcom | |
| September 14 | F-Zero 99 | NS | | Racing | Nintendo Software Technology | Nintendo | |
| September 14 | G-Mode Archives+: Megami Ibunroku Persona: Ikū no Tō-hen (JP) | NS | | Dungeon crawl | Atlus | G-Mode | |
| September 14 | Horizon Chase 2 | WIN, NS | | Racing | Aquiris | Epic Games | |
| September 14 | Inspector Gadget: Mad Time Party | WIN, NS, PS4, PS5, XBO, XBX/S | | Adventure | Smart Tale Games | Microids | |
| September 14 | Monster Hunter Now | iOS, DROID | | Action RPG | Niantic | Capcom | |
| September 14 | Mugen Souls Z | NS | | RPG | Compile Heart | eastasiasoft | |
| September 14 | Solace State | WIN, XBX/S | | Visual novel | Vivid Foundry | | |
| September 14 | Solar Ash | NS, XBO, XBX/S | | Action-adventure | Heart Machine | Annapurna Interactive | |
| September 14 | Summum Aeterna | WIN, NS, PS4, PS5, XBO, XBX/S | | Roguelike | Aeternum Game Studios | | |
| September 14 | Trombone Champ | NS | | Rhythm | Holy Wow Studios | | |
| September 14 | Ugly | WIN | | Platformer, Puzzle | Team Ugly | Graffiti Games | |
| September 14 | Wartales | NS | | Tactical RPG | Shiro Games/Unlimited | | |
| September 14 | We Were Here Expeditions: The FriendShip | WIN, PS4, PS5, XBO, XBX/S | | Puzzle | Total Mayhem Games | | |
| September 15 | Another Crusade | WIN, NS, PS4, PS5, XBO, XBX/S | | RPG | Dragon Vein Studios | Limited Run Games | |
| September 15 | NASCAR Arcade Rush | WIN, NS, PS4, PS5, XBO, XBX/S | | Racing | Team6 Game Studios | GameMill Entertainment | |
| September 15 | Wandering Sword | WIN | | RPG | The Swordman Studio | Spiral Up Games | |
| September 18 | Gloomhaven | NS, PS4, PS5, XBO, XBX/S | | Tactical RPG | Flaming Fowl Studios, Saber Interactive | Twin Sails Interactive | |
| September 19 | Bit.Trip Rerunner | WIN | | Rhythm, Platformer | Choice Provisions | | |
| September 19 | The Legend of Nayuta: Boundless Trails | WIN, NS, PS4 | | Action RPG | Nihon Falcom | NIS America | |
| September 19 | Lies of P | WIN, PS4, PS5, XBO, XBX/S | | Action RPG, Soulslike | Round8 Studio | Neowiz | |
| September 19 | Mortal Kombat 1 | WIN, NS, PS5, XBX/S | | Fighting | NetherRealm Studios | Warner Bros. Games | |
| September 20 | Moonstone Island | WIN, OSX | | Life sim, Deck building | Studio Supersoft | Raw Fury | |
| September 20 | Party Animals | WIN, XBO, XBX/S | | Party, Brawler | Recreate Games | Source Technology | |
| September 20 | Powerful Pro Baseball Eikan Nine Crossroad (JP) | iOS, DROID | | Sports | Konami | | |
| September 20 | Renfield: Bring Your Own Blood | WIN | | Horror, Roguelike, Shoot 'em up | Mega Cat Studios | Skybound Games | |
| September 21 | Astrea: Six-Sided Oracles | WIN | | Deck building (roguelike) | Little Leo Games | Akupara Games | |
| September 21 | Fragment's Note 2+ | NS | | Visual novel | Ullucus Heaven | | |
| September 21 | Mon-Yu | WIN, NS, PS5 | | RPG, Dungeon crawl | Experience | Aksys Games | |
| September 21 | Paperman: Adventure Delivered | WIN, NS, PS4, PS5, XBO, XBX/S | | Platformer | Secret Item Games | Mindscape | |
| September 21 | Payday 3 | WIN, PS5, XBX/S | | FPS | Starbreeze Studios | Prime Matter | |
| September 22 | AFL 23 | XBO, XBX/S | | Sports | Big Ant Studios | Nacon | |
| September 22 | Anno: Mutationem | XBO, XBX/S | | Action-adventure | ThinkingStars | Lightning Games | |
| September 22 | Avatar: The Last Airbender – Quest for Balance | WIN, NS, PS4, PS5, XBO, XBX/S | | Action-adventure | Bamtang Games | GameMill Entertainment | |
| September 22 | Baldur's Gate 3 | OSX | | RPG | Larian Studios | | |
| September 22 | The Bunny Graveyard | WIN | | PCA, Horror, Puzzle | Pichón Games | | |
| September 22 | Cyber Citizen Shockman 2: A New Menace | WIN, NS, PS4, PS5, XBO, XBX/S | | Action, Platformer | Masaya Games, Shinyuden | Ratalaika Games | |
| September 22 | The Legend of Nayuta: Boundless Trails (EU/OC) | WIN, NS, PS4 | | Action RPG | Nihon Falcom | NIS America | |
| September 23 | Atelier Resleriana: Forgotten Alchemy and the Polar Night Liberator (JP) | iOS, DROID | | RPG | Gust | Koei Tecmo, Akatsuki Games | |
| September 25 | Ray'z Arcade Chronology | WIN | | Shoot 'em up | M2 | Taito | |
| September 26 | El Paso, Elsewhere | WIN, XBO, XBX/S | | TPS | Strange Scaffold | | |
| September 26 | Harvest Moon: The Winds of Anthos | WIN, NS, PS4, PS5, XBO, XBX/S | | Farming | Appci Corporation | Natsume Inc. | |
| September 26 | Mineko's Night Market | WIN, NS | | Narrative adventure | Meowza Games | Humble Games | |
| September 26 | Paleo Pines | WIN, NS, PS4, PS5, XBO, XBX/S | | Simulation | Italic Pig | Modus Games | |
| September 26 | Storyteller | iOS, DROID | | Puzzle | Daniel Benmergui | Annapurna Interactive, Netflix | |
| September 26 | Train Sim World 4 | WIN, PS4, PS5, XBO, XBX/S | | Vehicle sim | Dovetail Games | | |
| September 26 | Ty the Tasmanian Tiger 4: Bush Rescue Returns | NS | | Platformer | Krome Studios | | |
| September 26 | WitchSpring R | WIN | | RPG | Kiwi Walks | | |
| September 27 | Counter-Strike 2 | WIN | | FPS | Valve | | |
| September 27 | Paper Beast Enhanced Edition | PS5 | | Adventure, Puzzle | Pixel Reef | | |
| September 27 | Roblox | Quest | Port | Sandbox | Roblox Corporation | | |
| September 28 | Abomi Nation | NS, XBO, XBX/S | | Monster tamer | Orange Pylon Games | DANGEN Entertainment | |
| September 28 | Disney Speedstorm | WIN, NS, PS4, PS5, XBO, XBX/S | | Racing | Gameloft Barcelona | Gameloft | |
| September 28 | Dolphin Spirit: Ocean Mission | WIN, NS, PS4, PS5, XBO, XBX/S | | Adventure | Magic Pockets | Microids | |
| September 28 | The Elder Scrolls: Castles | iOS, DROID | | CMS, Survival | Bethesda Game Studios | Bethesda Softworks | |
| September 28 | Everhood: Eternity Edition | PS4, PS5, XBO, XBX/S | | Adventure, RPG, Rhythm | Foreign Gnomes | Blitworks Games | |
| September 28 | Fate/Samurai Remnant (JP) | WIN, NS, PS4, PS5 | | Action RPG | Omega Force, Kou Shibusawa | Koei Tecmo | |
| September 28 | G-Mode Archives+: Megami Ibunroku Persona: Ikū no Tō-hen (JP) | WIN | | Dungeon crawl | Atlus | G-Mode | |
| September 28 | Gothic Classic | NS | | Action RPG | Piranha Bytes | THQ Nordic | |
| September 28 | Infinity Strash: Dragon Quest The Adventure of Dai | WIN, NS, PS4, PS5, XBX/S | | Action RPG | Game Studio, Kai Graphics | Square Enix | |
| September 28 | My Hero Ultra Rumble | WIN, NS, PS4, XBO | | Battle royale | Byking Inc. | Bandai Namco Entertainment | |
| September 28 | Overpass 2 | WIN, PS5, XBX/S | | Racing | Neopica | Nacon | |
| September 28 | Pizza Possum | WIN, NS, PS5, XBX/S | | Action | Cosy Computer | Raw Fury | |
| September 28 | Silent Hope (JP) | NS | | Action RPG | Marvelous | Marvelous, Xseed Games | |
| September 28 | Wildmender | WIN, PS5, XBX/S | | Survival | Muse Games | Kwalee | |
| September 28 | Ys X: Nordics (JP) | NS, PS4, PS5 | | Action RPG | Nihon Falcom | | |
| September 29 | Cocoon | WIN, NS, PS4, PS5, XBO, XBX/S | | Puzzle, Adventure | Geometric Interactive | Annapurna Interactive | |
| September 29 | EA Sports FC 24 | WIN, NS, PS4, PS5, XBO, XBX/S | | Sports | EA Vancouver, EA Romania | EA Sports | |
| September 29 | Fate/Samurai Remnant | WIN, NS, PS4, PS5 | | Action RPG | Omega Force, Kou Shibusawa | Koei Tecmo | |
| September 29 | Kirby & the Amazing Mirror | NS | Port | Platformer, Metroidvania | | | |
| September 29 | Savant: Ascent REMIX | WIN | | Platformer, Shoot 'em up | D-Pad Studio | | |
| September 29 | Torn Away | WIN | | Adventure | Perelesoq | OverGamez | |

=== October–December ===
| Release date | Title | Platform | Type | Genre | Developer | Publisher | Ref. |
|---|---|---|---|---|---|---|---|
| October 2 | Bilkins' Folly | WIN, NS, PS4, PS5 | | Adventure | Webbysoft | Armor Games Studios | |
| October 2 | Trepang2 | PS5, XBX/S | | FPS | Trepang Studios | Team17 | |
| October 3 | Disgaea 7: Vows of the Virtueless | WIN, NS, PS4, PS5 | | RPG | Nippon Ichi Software | | |
| October 3 | Ignistone | WIN, iOS, DROID | | Action, Roguelike | Mono Entertainment | Kodansha | |
| October 3 | In His Time | WIN | | Puzzle, Adventure | TearyHand Studio | Kodansha | |
| October 3 | Ira | WIN | | Roguelike, Shoot 'em up | ABShot | Nicalis | |
| October 3 | The Lamplighters League | WIN, XBO, XBX/S | | TBS | Harebrained Schemes | Paradox Interactive | |
| October 3 | Project Wingman: Frontline 59 | PS5 | | Simulation | Sector D2 | Humble Games | |
| October 3 | Scorn | PS5 | | Survival horror | Ebb Software | Kepler Interactive | |
| October 3 | Silent Hope | WIN, NS | | Action RPG | Marvelous | Marvelous, Xseed Games | |
| October 3 | The Wreck | DROID, iOS | | Narrative adventure, Visual novel | The Pixel Hunt | | |
| October 4 | Blossom Tales II: The Minotaur Prince | XBO, XBX/S | | Action-adventure | Castle Pixel | Playtonic Friends | |
| October 4 | Gungrave G.O.R.E – Ultimate Enhanced Edition (EU) | NS | | TPS | Studio IGGYMOB | Beep Japan | |
| October 4 | Warhammer 40,000: Darktide | XBX/S | | FPS | Fatshark | | |
| October 5 | Assassin's Creed Mirage | WIN, PS4, PS5, XBO, XBX/S | Original | Action-adventure | Ubisoft Bordeaux | Ubisoft | |
| October 5 | Cricket 24 | WIN, PS4, PS5, XBO, XBX/S | | Sports | Big Ant Studios | Nacon | |
| October 5 | The Dark Pictures Anthology: Little Hope | NS | Port | Interactive drama, Survival horror | Supermassive Games | Bandai Namco Entertainment | |
| October 5 | Front Mission 2: Remake | NS | | Tactical RPG | Storm Trident | Forever Entertainment | |
| October 5 | Knight vs Giant: The Broken Excalibur | WIN, NS, PS5, XBX/S | | Roguelike, Action RPG | Gambir Studio | PQube | |
| October 5 | The Sisters 2: Road to Fame | WIN, NS, PS4, PS5, XBO, XBX/S | | Party | Balio Studio | Microids | |
| October 5 | Sword Art Online: Last Recollection (JP) | WIN, PS4, PS5, XBO, XBX/S | | Action RPG | Aquria | Bandai Namco Entertainment | |
| October 5 | Wargroove 2 | WIN, NS | | TBT | Robotality, Chucklefish | Chucklefish | |
| October 6 | Borderlands 3 Ultimate Edition | NS | Port, Remaster | FPS | Gearbox Software | 2K | |
| October 6 | Detective Pikachu Returns | NS | | Adventure | Game Freak | The Pokémon Company, Nintendo | |
| October 6 | NHL 24 | PS4, PS5, XBO, XBX/S | | Sports | EA Vancouver | EA Sports | |
| October 6 | Sunshine Manor | NS, PS4, PS5, XBO, XBX/S | | RPG, Horror | Fossil Games | Hound Picked Games | |
| October 6 | Sword Art Online: Last Recollection | WIN, PS4, PS5, XBO, XBX/S | | Action RPG | Aquria | Bandai Namco Entertainment | |
| October 10 | Forza Motorsport | WIN, XBX/S | | Racing | Turn 10 Studios | Xbox Game Studios | |
| October 10 | Lil Gator Game | PS4, PS5, XBO, XBX/S | | Platformer | MegaWobble | Playtonic Friends | |
| October 10 | Long Gone Days | WIN, NS, PS4, PS5, XBO, XBX/S | | RPG | This I Dreamt | Serenity Forge | |
| October 10 | Roblox | PS4, PS5 | Port | Sandbox | Roblox Corporation | | |
| October 10 | Wild Card Football | WIN, NS, PS4, PS5, XBO, XBX/S | | Sports | Saber Interactive | | |
| October 11 | Honkai: Star Rail | PS5 | Port | RPG | HoYoverse | | |
| October 11 | Total War: Pharaoh | WIN | | RTS | Creative Assembly | Sega | |
| October 12 | The Caligula Effect 2 (JP) | PS5 | | RPG | historia | FuRyu | |
| October 12 | The Caligula Effect: Overdose (JP) | PS5 | | RPG | historia | FuRyu | |
| October 12 | Company of Heroes Collection | NS | | RTS | Feral Interactive | | |
| October 12 | Dementium: The Ward | NS | | Horror, FPS | atooi | | |
| October 12 | Dwerve | NS | | Tower defense, Action RPG | Half Human Games | | |
| October 12 | Haunted House | WIN, NS, PS4, PS5, XBO, XBX/S, ATRVCS | | Roguelike, Horror, Adventure | Orbit Studio | Atari | |
| October 12 | Mercenaries Lament: Requiem of the Silver Wolf | PS4, PS5 | | Tactical RPG | RideonJapan, Esquadra | Flyhigh Works | |
| October 12 | Rear Sekai (JP) | NS | | Action RPG | Hakama | Bushiroad | |
| October 12 | River City: Rival Showdown | WIN, NS, PS4 | | Brawler | A+ Games | Arc System Works | |
| October 12 | Saltsea Chronicles | WIN, NS, PS5 | | Adventure | Die Gute Fabrik | | |
| October 12 | Samba de Amigo: Virtual Party | Quest | Port | Rhythm | Sega | | |
| October 13 | Cut the Rope 3 | iOS | | Puzzle | ZeptoLab | Apple Arcade | |
| October 13 | Disgaea 7: Vows of the Virtueless (OC) | WIN, NS, PS4, PS5 | | RPG | Nippon Ichi Software | NIS America | |
| October 13 | Lords of the Fallen | WIN, PS5, XBX/S | | Action RPG | Hexworks | CI Games | |
| October 13 | Transformers: EarthSpark – Expedition | WIN, NS, PS4, PS5, XBO, XBX/S | | Action-adventure | Tessera Studios | Outright Games | |
| October 13 | Troublemaker: Raise Your Gang | XBO, XBX/S | | Action-adventure | Gamecom Team | Freedom Games | |
| October 16 | Kingdom Eighties: Summer of Greed | NS, PS5, XBX/S, iOS, DROID | | Strategy | Fury Studios | Raw Fury | |
| October 16 | SpongeBob SquarePants: The Cosmic Shake | PS5, XBX/S | Port | Platformer | Purple Lamp | THQ Nordic | |
| October 17 | A Boy and His Blob: Retro Collection | NS, PS4, PS5 | | Platformer | Ziggurat Interactive | Ziggurat Interactive, Limited Run Games | |
| October 17 | The Caligula Effect 2 (NA) | PS5 | | RPG | historia | NIS America | |
| October 17 | Mobile Suit Gundam U.C. Engage | iOS, DROID | | Strategy | Bandai Namco Studios | Bandai Namco Entertainment | |
| October 17 | Mortal Kombat: Onslaught | iOS, DROID | | RPG | NetherRealm Studios | Warner Bros. Games | |
| October 17 | Skull Island: Rise of Kong | WIN, NS, PS4, PS5, XBO, XBX/S | | Action-adventure | IguanaBee | GameMill Entertainment | |
| October 17 | Sonic Superstars | WIN, NS, PS4, PS5, XBO, XBX/S | | Platformer | Sonic Team, Arzest | Sega | |
| October 17 | Wizard with a Gun | WIN, PS5, XBX/S | | Adventure, Roguelike, Sandbox, Shooter, Survival | Galvanic Games | Devolver Digital | |
| October 18 | Gungrave G.O.R.E – Ultimate Enhanced Edition (NA) | NS | | TPS | Studio IGGYMOB | Beep Japan | |
| October 18 | Hellboy Web of Wyrd | WIN, NS, PS4, PS5, XBO, XBX/S | | Brawler, Roguelike | Upstream Arcade | Good Shepherd Entertainment | |
| October 18 | Kona II: Brume | WIN, NS, PS4, PS5, XBO, XBX/S | | Adventure | Parabole | Ravenscourt | |
| October 18 | Life of Delta | PS5, XBX/S | | PCA | Airo Games | Daedalic Entertainment | |
| October 18 | Slender: The Arrival | PS5, XBX/S | | Survival horror | Blue Isle Studios | Blue Isle Studios | |
| October 19 | The 7th Guest VR | WIN, PS5, Quest | | Adventure | Vertigo Games | | |
| October 19 | Agatha Christie: Murder on the Orient Express | WIN, NS, PS4, PS5, XBO, XBX/S | | Adventure | Microids Studio Lyon | Microids | |
| October 19 | AirportSim | WIN | | Simulation | MS Games, MK Studios | Iceberg Interactive | |
| October 19 | Endless Dungeon | WIN, PS4, PS5, XBO, XBX/S | | Tower defense, Roguelike | Amplitude Studios | Sega | |
| October 19 | Gangs of Sherwood | WIN, PS5, XBX/S | | Action | Appeal Studios | Nacon | |
| October 19 | The Gap | WIN, PS4, PS5, XBO, XBX/S | | Adventure | Label This | Crunching Koalas | |
| October 19 | Gargoyles Remastered | WIN, NS, PS4, XBO | | Platformer | Empty Clip Studios | Disney Games | |
| October 19 | Hot Wheels Unleashed 2: Turbocharged | WIN, NS, PS4, PS5, XBO, XBX/S | | Racing | Milestone | | |
| October 19 | Inescapable: No Rules, No Rescue | WIN, NS, PS4, PS5, XBO, XBX/S | | Adventure, Visual novel | Dreamloop Games | Aksys Games | |
| October 19 | The Jackbox Party Pack 10 | WIN, NS, PS4, PS5, XBX/S | | Party | Jackbox Games | | |
| October 19 | Laika: Aged Through Blood | WIN | | Metroidvania, Action-adventure | Brainwash Gang | Headup Publishing | |
| October 19 | Mail Time | NS, PS4, PS5 | | Adventure | Appelmoes Games | Freedom Games | |
| October 19 | Makoto Wakaido's Case Files Deluxe Trilogy | WIN, NS | | Adventure | Hakaba Bunko | room6 | |
| October 19 | Passpartout 2: The Lost Artist | NS | | Adventure | Flamebait Games | Happinet | |
| October 19 | Spirit of the Island | NS, PS4, PS5, XBO, XBX/S | | Simulation, RPG | 1 Million Bits Horde | PID Games, Meta Publishing | |
| October 19 | Sushi Ben | Quest | | Adventure | Big Brane Studios | | |
| October 19 | World of Horror | WIN, NS, PS4, PS5 | | Horror, RPG | Panstasz | Ysbyrd Games | |
| October 19 | Xaladia: Rise of the Space Pirates X2 | WIN, NS, PS5 | | Shoot 'em up (twin-stick) | Acquire | | |
| October 20 | The Caligula Effect 2 (EU) | PS5 | | RPG | historia | NIS America | |
| October 20 | Marvel's Spider-Man 2 | PS5 | Original | Action-adventure | Insomniac Games | Sony Interactive Entertainment | |
| October 20 | Suika Game | NS | | Puzzle | Aladdin X | | |
| October 20 | Super Mario Bros. Wonder | NS | | Platformer | Nintendo EPD | Nintendo | |
| October 20 | TrinityS | WIN, PS4, PS5 | | Action | Indie-Us Games | Indie-Us Games, Phoenixx | |
| October 20 | Warm Snow | NS, PS4, PS5, XBO, XBX/S | | Roguelike, Action | BadMudStudio | Microids, Bilibili | |
| October 23 | Hotline Miami | PS5, XBX/S | Port | Shoot 'em up | Dennaton Games | Devolver Digital | |
| October 23 | Hotline Miami 2: Wrong Number | PS5, XBX/S | Port | Shoot 'em up | Dennaton Games | Devolver Digital | |
| October 23 | Lethal Company | WIN | | Survival horror | Zeekerss | | |
| October 23 | Slay the Princess | WIN, OSX, LIN | | Visual novel, Horror, Dating sim | Black Tabby Games | | |
| October 23 | Vengeance of Mr. Peppermint | WIN | | Brawler | Hack The Publisher | Freedom Games | |
| October 24 | Archetype Arcadia | WIN, NS, PS4, PS5 | | Visual novel | Water Phoenix | PQube | |
| October 24 | Black Lily’s Tale (JP) | WIN | Original | Dating sim, Visual novel | 1000-REKA | 1000-REKA, mirai works | |
| October 24 | Cities: Skylines II | WIN | | City builder | Colossal Order | Paradox Interactive | |
| October 24 | Crymachina (NA) | WIN, NS, PS4, PS5 | | Action RPG | Aquria | NIS America | |
| October 24 | Dark Envoy | WIN | | RPG | Event Horizon | Twin Sails Interactive | |
| October 24 | Just Dance 2024 Edition | NS, PS5, XBX/S | | Rhythm | Ubisoft Paris | Ubisoft | |
| October 24 | The Lord of the Rings: Return to Moria | WIN | | Survival | Free Range Games | North Beach Games | |
| October 24 | Metal Gear Solid Master Collection Vol. 1 | WIN, NS, PS4, PS5, XBX/S | Compilation | Action-adventure, Stealth | Konami | | |
| October 25 | Postal: Brain Damaged | PS4, PS5 | | FPS | CreativeForge Games, Hyperstrange | Running with Scissors, Hyperstrange | |
| October 25 | Stray Souls | WIN, PS4, PS5, XBO, XBX/S | | Horror (psych) | Jukai Studio | Versus Evil | |
| October 26 | Aquarium. (JP) | WIN | | Visual novel | Entergram | | |
| October 26 | Dave the Diver | NS | | Fishing, Adventure | Mintrocket | | |
| October 26 | Frog Detective: The Entire Mystery | NS, PS4, PS5, XBO, XBX/S | | Adventure | worm club | | |
| October 26 | Ghostbusters: Rise of the Ghost Lord | WIN, PS5, Quest | | Action-adventure | NDreams | | |
| October 26 | Ghostrunner 2 | WIN, PS5, XBX/S | | Hack and slash | One More Level | 505 Games | |
| October 26 | Ginka | WIN | | Visual novel | Frontwing | Bushiroad Games | |
| October 26 | Great Ambition of the SLIMES | NS | | Tactical RPG | Altair Works | Flyhigh Works | |
| October 26 | Hello Kitty and Friends: Happiness Parade | NS | | Rhythm | Dabadu Games | Rogue Games | |
| October 26 | Idol Mahjong Final Romance 4 Remaster (JP) | NS | | Puzzle | City Connection | | |
| October 26 | Journey to Foundation | PS5, Quest | | Adventure | Archiact | | |
| October 26 | Mineko's Night Market | PS4, PS5, XBO | | Narrative adventure | Meowza Games | Humble Games | |
| October 26 | Out Of Scale - A Kurzgesagt Adventure | Quest | | Educational | Schell Games | Meta Platforms | |
| October 26 | Reverse: 1999 | WIN, DROID, iOS | | TBT, RPG | Bluepoch | | |
| October 26 | Spin Rhythm XD | NS | | Rhythm | Super Spin Digital | | |
| October 26 | Valkyrious | DROID, iOS | Original | Digital tabletop | Lightcon | | |
| October 26 | Visco Collection | WIN, NS, PS4, PS5, XBO, XBX/S | | —N/a | QUByte Interactive | | |
| October 26 | Yumeiro Yuram (JP) | NS, PS4 | | Puzzle | Nippon Ichi Software | | |
| October 27 | Alan Wake II | WIN, PS5, XBX/S | Original | Survival horror | Remedy Entertainment | Epic Games Publishing | |
| October 27 | Crymachina (EU) | WIN, NS, PS4, PS5 | | Action RPG | Aquria | NIS America | |
| October 27 | Desolatium | WIN, NS, PS4, PS5, XBO, XBX/S | | Adventure | Superlumen | Soedesco | |
| October 27 | DreamWorks Trolls Remix Rescue | WIN, NS, PS4, PS5, XBO, XBX/S | | Platformer | Petit Fabrik | GameMill Entertainment | |
| October 27 | EA Sports UFC 5 | PS5, XBX/S | | Sports | EA Vancouver | EA Sports | |
| October 27 | Mario Party 3 | NS | Port | Party | | | |
| October 27 | MISTROGUE: Mist and the Living Dungeons | WIN | | Roguelike | Polyscape | | |
| October 27 | Terminator: Resistance Complete Edition | XBX/S | | FPS | Teyon | Reef Entertainment | |
| October 30 | Resident Evil Village | iOS | Port | Survival horror | Capcom | | |
| October 31 | Castlevania Legends | NS | | Action, Platformer | | | |
| October 31 | Devil World | NS | | Maze | | | |
| October 31 | Dusk | PS4 | | FPS | David Szymanski | New Blood Interactive | |
| October 31 | The Foglands | PS5, Quest | | FPS, Roguelike | Well Told Entertainment | | |
| October 31 | The Forest Cathedral | PS5 | | Adventure | Brian Wilson | Whitethorn Games | |
| October 31 | Headbangers: Rhythm Royale | WIN, NS, PS5, XBX/S | | Party, Rhythm | Glee-Cheese Games | Team17 | |
| October 31 | Jusant | WIN, PS5, XBX/S | | Platformer | Don't Nod | | |
| October 31 | Little Goody Two Shoes | WIN, NS, PS5, XBX/S | | Horror, RPG | AstralShift | Square Enix Collective | |
| October 31 | The Mysterious Murasame Castle | NS | Port | Action-adventure | | | |
| October 31 | Wartales | XBO, XBX/S | | Tactical RPG | Shiro Games/Unlimited | | |
| October 31 | You Will Die Here Tonight | WIN | | Horror | Spiral Bound Interactive | | |
| November 1 | Alien Hominid HD | WIN, NS, XBO, XBX/S | Port | Run and gun | The Behemoth | | |
| November 1 | Alien Hominid Invasion | WIN, NS, XBO, XBX/S | Port | Run and gun | The Behemoth | | |
| November 1 | Little Noah: Scion of Paradise | XBO, XBX/S | | Roguelike, Action | Cygames, Grounding | Cygames | |
| November 1 | Ninja or Die: Shadow of the Sun | NS | | Roguelike | Nao Games | Marvelous | |
| November 1 | RollerCoaster Tycoon Adventures Deluxe | WIN, NS, PS4, PS5, XBX/S | | Simulation | Graphite Lab, Nvizzio Creations | Atari SA | |
| November 1 | Song of Nunu: A League of Legends Story | WIN, NS, PS4, PS5, XBO, XBX/S | | Action-adventure | Tequila Works | Riot Forge | |
| November 1 | Taiko no Tatsujin RHYTHM CONNECT (JP) | iOS, DROID | | Rhythm | Bandai Namco Studios | Bandai Namco Entertainment | |
| November 1 | This Bed We Made | WIN, PS5 | | Adventure | Lowbirth Games | | |
| November 2 | Achilles: Legends Untold | WIN, PS5, XBX/S | | Action RPG | Dark Point Games | | |
| November 2 | Blasphemous 2 | PS4, XBO | | Metroidvania | The Game Kitchen | Team17 | |
| November 2 | Fashion Dreamer | NS | | Simulation | syn Sophia | Marvelous | |
| November 2 | For the King II | WIN | | Roguelike, RPG | IronOak Games | Curve Games | |
| November 2 | The Fox Awaits Me HANA | NS | | Visual novel | TALESshop | Cosen | |
| November 2 | The Iron Oath | WIN, OSX | | Tactical RPG | Curious Panda Games | Humble Games | |
| November 2 | My Time at Sandrock | WIN, NS, PS4, PS5, XBO, XBX/S | | Action RPG, Simulation | Pathea Games | PM Studios | |
| November 2 | Phantom Blade: Executioners | WIN, PS4, PS5, iOS, DROID | | Action RPG | S-GAME | | |
| November 2 | PlateUp! | NS, PS4, PS5, XBO, XBX/S | | Roguelike, CMS | It's Happening | Yogscast Games | |
| November 2 | RoboCop: Rogue City | WIN, PS5, XBX/S | | FPS | Teyon | Nacon | |
| November 2 | The Smurfs 2: The Prisoner of the Green Stone | WIN, NS, PS4, PS5, XBO, XBX/S | | RTS | OSome | Microids | |
| November 2 | Star Ocean: The Second Story R | WIN, NS, PS4, PS5 | | Action RPG | Gemdrops | Square Enix | |
| November 2 | The Talos Principle 2 | WIN, PS5, XBX/S | | Puzzle | Croteam | Devolver Digital | |
| November 2 | Thirsty Suitors | WIN, NS, PS4, PS5, XBO, XBX/S | | Action RPG | Outerloop Games | Annapurna Interactive | |
| November 3 | DreamWorks All-Star Kart Racing | WIN, NS, PS4, PS5, XBO, XBX/S | | Racing (kart) | Bamtang Games | GameMill Entertainment | |
| November 3 | EA Sports WRC | WIN, PS5, XBX/S | | Racing | Codemasters | EA Sports | |
| November 3 | Ebenezer and the Invisible World | WIN, NS, PS4, PS5, XBO, XBX/S | | Metroidvania | Orbit, Play On Worlds | Play On Worlds | |
| November 3 | Fashion Dreamer | NS | | Simulation | syn Sophia | NA: Xseed Games; EU: Marvelous Europe | |
| November 3 | Quantum Error | PS5 | | Shooter, Horror | TeamKill Media | | |
| November 3 | Radiant Silvergun | WIN | | Shoot 'em up | Treasure | Live Wire | |
| November 3 | Warcraft Rumble | iOS, DROID | | Tower defense, RTS | Blizzard Entertainment | | |
| November 3 | WarioWare: Move It! | NS | | Party, Action | Intelligent Systems | Nintendo | |
| November 6 | Football Manager 2024 | WIN, NS, PS4, PS5, XBO, XBX/S, iOS, DROID | | Sports | Sports Interactive | Sega | |
| November 6 | The Invincible | WIN, PS5, XBX/S | | Action-adventure | Starward Industries | 11 bit studios | |
| November 7 | Kill It With Fire VR | PS5 | | FPS | Casey Donnellan Games | TinyBuild | |
| November 7 | Nickelodeon All-Star Brawl 2 | WIN, NS, PS4, PS5, XBO, XBX/S | | Fighting | Ludosity, Fair Play Labs | GameMill Entertainment | |
| November 7 | Roboquest | WIN, XBO, XBX/S | | Roguelike, FPS | RyseUp Studios | Starbreeze Studios | |
| November 7 | Salt and Sacrifice | NS | | Action RPG | Ska Studios, Devoured Studios | Ska Studios | |
| November 7 | SpellForce: Conquest of Eo | PS5, XBX/S | | TBS | Owned by Gravity | THQ Nordic | |
| November 7 | Stronghold: Definitive Edition | WIN | | RTS | Firefly Studios | | |
| November 7 | Tintin Reporter – Cigars of the Pharaoh | WIN, PS5, XBO, XBX/S | | Adventure | Pendulo Studios | Microids | |
| November 8 | Gunhead | WIN, PS5 | | Roguelike, FPS | Alientrap | | |
| November 8 | Risk of Rain Returns | WIN, NS | | Action, Roguelike | Hopoo Games | Gearbox Publishing | |
| November 9 | 9 Years of Shadows | NS | | Metroidvania | Halberd Studios | Freedom Games | |
| November 9 | Bem Feito | WIN, NS, PS4, PS5, XBO, XBX/S | | Life sim | oiCabie | QUByte Interactive | |
| November 9 | Berzerk: Recharged | WIN, NS, PS4, PS5, XBO, XBX/S, ATRVCS | | Shoot 'em up | SneakyBox | Atari | |
| November 9 | Cuisineer | WIN | | Action, Roguelike | BattleBrew Productions | NA: Xseed Games; EU: Marvelous Europe | |
| November 9 | Devil Engine: Complete Edition | NS, PS4, PS5, XBO, XBX/S | | Shoot 'em up | Protoculture Games, Poppy Works | Beep Japan, Poppy Works | |
| November 9 | Double Dragon Advance | WIN, NS, PS4, XBO | | Brawler | Arc System Works | | |
| November 9 | Double Dragon Collection | NS | | Brawler | Arc System Works | | |
| November 9 | Dungeons 4 | WIN, PS5, XBX/S | | RTS | Realmforge Studios | Kalypso Media | |
| November 9 | Ikonei Island: An Earthlock Adventure | WIN | | Adventure, Sandbox | Snowcastle Games | | |
| November 9 | Like a Dragon Gaiden: The Man Who Erased His Name | WIN, PS4, PS5, XBO, XBX/S | | Action-adventure | Ryu Ga Gotoku Studio | Sega | |
| November 9 | Sanabi | WIN, NS | | Action, Platformer | Wonder Potion | Neowiz | |
| November 9 | Spells & Secrets | WIN, NS, PS5, XBX/S | | Action-adventure, Roguelike | rokaplay, Alchemist Interactive | rokaplay, Merge Games | |
| November 9 | Super Double Dragon | WIN, NS, PS4, XBO | | Brawler | Arc System Works | | |
| November 9 | Virche Evermore: -ErroR:salvation- | NS | | Visual novel | Hyde | Aksys Games | |
| November 9 | What the Duck | WIN, NS | | Action-adventure, RPG | Seize Studios | Untold Tales | |
| November 9 | While the Iron's Hot | WIN, NS, PS4, PS5, XBO, XBX/S | | Adventure | Bontemp Games | Humble Games | |
| November 10 | Air Twister | WIN, NS, PS4, PS5, XBO, XBX/S | | Shoot 'em up (rail) | Cadabra Games | QUByte Interactive | |
| November 10 | Call of Duty: Modern Warfare III | WIN, PS4, PS5, XBO, XBX/S | Original | FPS | Sledgehammer Games | Activision | |
| November 13 | Spirittea | WIN, NS, XBO, XBX/S | | Life sim | Cheesemaster Games | No More Robots | |
| November 14 | Astral Ascent | WIN, NS, PS4, PS5 | | Platformer, Roguelike | Hibernian Workshop | Maple Whispering | |
| November 14 | Backpack Hero | WIN, NS | | Roguelike | Jaspel | Jaspel, IndieArk, Different Tales | |
| November 14 | Coral Island | WIN, PS5, XBX/S | Original | Simulation | Stairway Games | Humble Games | |
| November 14 | Gubbins | iOS, DROID | | Puzzle | Studio Folly | | |
| November 14 | Hogwarts Legacy | NS | Port | Action RPG | Avalanche Software | Warner Bros. Games | |
| November 14 | Howl | WIN, NS | | TBS | Mi'pu'mi Games | Astragon Entertainment | |
| November 14 | Invincible Presents: Atom Eve | WIN | | Visual novel | Terrible Posture Games | Skybound Games | |
| November 14 | KarmaZoo | WIN, NS, PS5, XBX/S | | Platformer | Pastagames | Devolver Digital | |
| November 14 | Refind Self: The Personality Test Game | WIN, iOS, DROID | | Adventure | Lizardry | Playism | |
| November 14 | Super Crazy Rhythm Castle | WIN, NS, PS4, PS5, XBO, XBX/S | | Rhythm | Second Impact Games | Konami | |
| November 14 | UFO Robot Grendizer: The Feast of the Wolves | WIN, PS4, PS5, XBO, XBX/S | | Action-adventure, Brawler | Endroad | Microids | |
| November 15 | American Arcadia | WIN | | Puzzle, Platformer | Out of the Blue Games | Raw Fury | |
| November 15 | Koi-Koi: Love Blossoms | PS5 | | Adventure | Apricot Heart | | |
| November 15 | The Last Faith | WIN, NS, PS4, PS5, XBO, XBX/S | | Metroidvania | Kumi Souls Games | Playstack | |
| November 15 | Naheulbeuk's Dungeon Master | WIN | | Dungeon management | Artefacts Studio | Dear Villagers | |
| November 15 | Teardown | PS5, XBX/S | | Sandbox, Puzzle, Action | Tuxedo Labs | Saber Interactive | |
| November 16 | ARMA Reforger | WIN, XBX/S | | FPS | Bohemia Interactive | | |
| November 16 | Assassin's Creed Nexus VR | Quest | | Action-adventure | Red Storm Entertainment | Ubisoft | |
| November 16 | Astlibra Revision | NS | | Action RPG | KEIZO | WhisperGames | |
| November 16 | Flashback 2 | WIN, NS, PS4, PS5, XBO, XBX/S | | Cinematic platformer | Paul Cuisset, Microids Studio Lyon | Microids | |
| November 16 | Jagged Alliance 3 | PS4, PS5, XBO, XBX/S | | RTS | Haemimont Games | THQ Nordic | |
| November 16 | The Kindeman Remedy | WIN | | CMS | Troglobytes Games | 3D Realms | |
| November 16 | The King of Fighters XIII: Global Match | NS, PS4 | | Fighting | SNK | | |
| November 16 | Loddlenaut | WIN, OSX | Original | Cozy, adventure, simulation | Moon Lagoon | Secret Mode | |
| November 16 | Momotaro Dentetsu World: Chikyuu wa Kibou de Mawatteru! (JP) | NS | | Digital tabletop | Konami Digital Entertainment | | |
| November 16 | Naruto x Boruto: Ultimate Ninja Storm Connections (JP) | WIN, NS, PS4, PS5, XBO, XBX/S | | Fighting | CyberConnect2 | Bandai Namco Entertainment | |
| November 16 | Small Saga | WIN, OSX | | RPG | Jeremy Noghani | | |
| November 16 | Yohane the Parhelion: Blaze in the Deepblue | WIN, NS, PS4, PS5, XBO, XBX/S | | Action | Inti Creates | | |
| November 17 | Barton Lynch Pro Surfing | WIN, PS5, XBX/S | | Sports | Bungarra Software | | |
| November 17 | Bluey: The Videogame | WIN, NS, PS4, PS5, XBO, XBX/S | | Adventure | Artax Games | Outright Games | |
| November 17 | The Forest Quartet | NS | | Puzzle | Mads & Friends | Bedtime Digital Games | |
| November 17 | Hira Hira Hihiru | WIN | | Visual novel | BA-KU | ANIPLEX.EXE | |
| November 17 | Naruto x Boruto: Ultimate Ninja Storm Connections | WIN, NS, PS4, PS5, XBO, XBX/S | | Fighting | CyberConnect2 | Bandai Namco Entertainment | |
| November 17 | Persona 5 Tactica | WIN, NS, PS4, PS5, XBO, XBX/S | | Tactical RPG | P-Studio | Atlus | |
| November 17 | Super Mario RPG | NS | Remake | RPG | ArtePiazza | Nintendo | |
| November 17 | Tiger Blade | PS5 | | Action | Ikimasho | Big Sugar | |
| November 17 | The Walking Dead: Destinies | WIN, NS, PS4, PS5, XBO, XBX/S | | Action-adventure | Flux Games | GameMill Entertainment | |
| November 17 | Warhammer: Age of Sigmar – Realms of Ruin | WIN, PS5, XBX/S | | RTS | Frontier Developments | | |
| November 20 | In Stars and Time | WIN, NS, PS4, PS5 | | RPG | insertdisc5 | Armor Games Studios | |
| November 21 | Jujutsu Kaisen: Phantom Parade | OSX, iOS, DROID | | Action RPG | Sumzap | | |
| November 21 | Pui Pui Molcar Let's! Molcar Party! | NS | | Party | Groove Box Japan | Nighthawk Interactive | |
| November 21 | Valfaris: Mecha Therion | WIN | | Shoot 'em up | Steel Mantis | Big Sugar | |
| November 21 | Worldless | WIN, NS, PS4, PS5, XBO, XBX/S | | Adventure, Platformer | Noname Studios | Coatsink | |
| November 22 | Dyschronia: Chronos Alternate | NS | | Adventure | Izanagi Games | MyDearest, Inc. | |
| November 23 | Ninja Issen | WIN | | Action | Asteroid-J | CFK | |
| November 28 | Calico | PS4, PS5 | | Simulation | Peachy Keen Games | Whitethorn Games | |
| November 28 | Last Train Home | WIN | | RTS | Ashborne Games | THQ Nordic | |
| November 28 | Noctuary | WIN | | Action-adventure | Gratesca Studio | | |
| November 28 | Rollerdrome | XBX/S | | TPS | Roll7 | Private Division | |
| November 28 | Roots of Pacha | NS, PS4, PS5 | | Simulation, RPG | Soda Den | | |
| November 29 | The Exit 8 | WIN | | Horror, Adventure | Kotake Create | | |
| November 29 | Gothic II Complete Classic | NS | | Action RPG | Piranha Bytes | THQ Nordic | |
| November 30 | Bakeru (JP) | NS | | Action | Good-Feel | | |
| November 30 | Black Clover M: Rise of the Wizard King | iOS, DROID | | RPG | Vic Game Studios | Garena | |
| November 30 | Cattails: Wildwood Story | NS | | Farming, RPG | Falcon Development | | |
| November 30 | Cookie Run: The Darkest Night | Quest | | Roguelike, Action-adventure | Devsisters | | |
| November 30 | Cupid Parasite: Sweet & Spicy Darling (JP) | NS | | Visual novel | Idea Factory | | |
| November 30 | Despera Drops (JP) | NS | | Visual novel | Red Entertainment | Aksys Games | |
| November 30 | Jet Force Gemini (JP) | NS | Port | Platformer, TPS | | | |
| November 30 | Pinball M | WIN, PS4, PS5, XBO, XBX/S | | Pinball | Zen Studios | Pinball | |
| November 30 | Tevi | WIN, NS | | Metroidvania | CreSpirit, GemaYue | CreSpirit | |
| November 30 | Tintin Reporter – Cigars of the Pharaoh | PS4 | | Adventure | Pendulo Studios | Microids | |
| November 30 | Trip World DX | NS | | Platformer | Sunsoft | Limited Run Games | |
| November 30 | Turok 3: Shadow of Oblivion | WIN, NS, PS4, PS5, XBO, XBX/S | | FPS | Nightdive Interactive | | |
| December 1 | Batman: Arkham Trilogy | NS | | Action-adventure | Rocksteady Studios | Warner Bros. Games | |
| December 1 | A Boy and His Blob: Retro Collection | WIN | | Platformer | Ziggurat Interactive | Ziggurat Interactive, Limited Run Games | |
| December 1 | Dragon Quest Monsters: The Dark Prince | NS | | RPG | Tose | Square Enix | |
| December 1 | SteamWorld Build | WIN, NS, PS4, PS5, XBO, XBX/S | | CMS | The Station | Thunderful Publishing | |
| December 2 | Murder Mystery Paradox: Fifteen Years of Summer | WIN | | Visual novel | Fahrenheit 213 | Aniplex | |
| December 5 | Arashi: Castles of Sin – Final Cut | WIN, PS5, Quest | | Stealth, Action | Endeavor One | Skydance Interactive | |
| December 5 | Born of Bread | WIN, NS, PS5, XBX/S | | Action RPG | Wild Arts | Dear Villagers | |
| December 5 | Captain Tsubasa: Ace | iOS, DROID | | Sports | Program Twenty Three | DeNA | |
| December 5 | Disney Dreamlight Valley | WIN, OSX, NS, PS4, PS5, XBO, XBX/S | | Life sim, Action | Gameloft Montreal | Gameloft | |
| December 5 | A Highland Song | WIN, OSX, NS | | Adventure | Inkle | | |
| December 5 | Kingpin: Reloaded | WIN | | FPS | Slipgate Ironworks | 3D Realms, Interplay Entertainment | |
| December 5 | Laika: Aged Through Blood | PS4, PS5, XBO, XBX/S | | Metroidvania, Action-adventure | Brainwash Gang | Headup Games | |
| December 5 | The Lord of the Rings: Return to Moria | PS5 | | Survival | Free Range Games | North Beach Games | |
| December 5 | Sonic Dream Team | OSX, iOS | | Platformer | Hardlight | Sega | |
| December 7 | Arizona Sunshine 2 | WIN, PS5, Quest | | FPS | Vertigo Games | | |
| December 7 | Avatar: Frontiers of Pandora | WIN, PS5, XBX/S | | Action-adventure | Massive Entertainment | Ubisoft | |
| December 7 | A Date with Death | WIN, OSX, LIN | | Visual novel, Dating sim | Two and a Half Studios | | |
| December 7 | DoDonPachi Blissful Death Re:Incarnation (JP) | NS, PS4 | | Shoot 'em up | M2, Cave | M2 | |
| December 7 | Final Fantasy VII: Ever Crisis | WIN | Port | RPG | Applibot, Square Enix | Square Enix | |
| December 7 | The Finals | WIN, PS5, XBX/S | | FPS | Embark Studios | | |
| December 7 | Hollow Cocoon | WIN | | Horror, Adventure | Nayuta Studio | | |
| December 7 | Lego Bricktales VR | Quest | | Puzzle, Adventure | ClockStone Studio | Thunderful Publishing | |
| December 7 | Silence Channel 2 | WIN | | Survival horror | Lexip Games | | |
| December 7 | Throne and Liberty (KR) | WIN | | MMO, RPG | NCSoft | | |
| December 7 | Undying | WIN | | Survival | Vanimals | Skystone Games | |
| December 7 | Wallace & Gromit in The Grand Getaway | Quest | | Adventure | Aardman | Astrea | |
| December 7 | Warhammer 40,000: Rogue Trader | WIN, OSX, PS5, XBX/S | | RPG | Owlcat Games | | |
| December 8 | 1080° Snowboarding | NS | Port | Sports | | | |
| December 8 | Against the Storm | WIN | | City builder | Eremite Games | Hooded Horse | |
| December 8 | Baldur's Gate 3 | XBX/S | | RPG | Larian Studios | | |
| December 8 | Harvest Moon 64 | NS | Port | Farming | | | |
| December 8 | Jet Force Gemini (WW) | NS | Port | Platformer, TPS | | | |
| December 8 | Xuan-Yuan Sword: Mists Beyond the Mountains | WIN, NS | | RPG | Softstar | Gamera Games, eastasiasoft | |
| December 12 | Hammerwatch 2 | NS, PS5 | | Hack and slash, Action RPG | Crackshell | Modus Games | |
| December 13 | Ready or Not | WIN | | FPS, Tactical shooter | VOID Interactive | | |
| December 14 | Bahnsen Knights | WIN, OSX | | Adventure | LCB Game Studio | Chorus Worldwide | |
| December 14 | Bulletstorm VR | WIN, PS5, Quest | | FPS | Incuvo | People Can Fly | |
| December 14 | Custom Mech Wars | WIN, PS5 | | TPS | D3 Publisher | | |
| December 14 | Gnosia | PS4, PS5, XBO, XBX/S | | RPG | Petit Depotto | Playism | |
| December 14 | Granblue Fantasy Versus: Rising | WIN, PS4, PS5 | Original | Fighting | Arc System Works | Cygames | |
| December 14 | Grand Theft Auto: The Trilogy – The Definitive Edition | iOS, DROID | Port | Action-adventure | Grove Street Games | Rockstar Games | |
| December 14 | House Flipper 2 | WIN | | Simulation | Frozen District | PlayWay | |
| December 14 | Koumajou Remilia II: Stranger's Requiem | WIN, NS | | Action | Frontier Aja | CFK | |
| December 14 | Raccoo Venture | WIN, NS, PS4, PS5, XBO, XBX/S | | Platformer | QUByte Interactive | | |
| December 14 | River Tails: Stronger Together | WIN | | Platformer | Kid Onion Studio | Gravity Game Arise | |
| December 14 | Witch on the Holy Night | WIN | | Visual novel | Type-Moon | Aniplex | |
| December 15 | Asgard's Wrath 2 | Quest | | Action RPG | Sanzaru Games | Oculus Studios | |
| December 19 | Raindrop Sprinters | WIN | | Action | room_909 | Mediascape Co. Ltd. | |
| December 20 | Resident Evil 4 | OSX, iOS | | Survival horror | Capcom | | |
| December 20 | The Rumble Fish+ | NS, PS4, XBO | | Fighting | Dimps | 3goo | |
| December 21 | Freddi Fish 4: The Case of the Hogfish Rustlers of Briny Gulch | NS, PS4 | Port | Adventure | Humongous Entertainment | UFO Interactive Games | |
| December 21 | Pajama Sam 3: You Are What You Eat from Your Head to Your Feet | NS, PS4 | Port | Adventure | Humongous Entertainment | UFO Interactive Games | |
| December 21 | Rail Romanesque Origin (JP) | NS, PS4 | | Visual novel | RaRo | | |
| December 21 | Spy × Anya: Operation Memories (JP) | NS | | Adventure | Groove Box Japan | Bandai Namco Entertainment | |
| December 21 | Zero to Dance Hero (JP) | NS | | Fitness, Rhythm | SmileBoom | Imagineer | |
| December 22 | One. | WIN | | Visual novel | Novamicus | Nexton | |
| December 26 | The Rumble Fish+ | WIN | | Fighting | Dimps | 3goo | |
| December 28 | Buckshot Roulette | WIN, LIN | | Strategy, Horror | Mike Klubnika | | |
| December 28 | Cookie Run: Kingdom (CN) | iOS, DROID, WIN | | Action RPG | Devsisters, Tencent Games | | |
| December 28 | Magicians Dead: Force of the Soul (JP) | PS4 | | Action | Byking | Oizumi Amuzio | |
| December 28 | Pinball M | NS | | Pinball | Zen Studios | | |
