= List of action role-playing video games: 2020 to 2029 =

This is a comprehensive index of commercial action role-playing games (Action RPGs), sorted chronologically by year. Information regarding release platform, release type, game setting, developers, publishers, and country of origin is provided where available. The table can be sorted by clicking on the small boxes next to the column headings.

This page includes any games listed as either Action RPGs or Soulslikes. This page does not currently include games listed as Looter shooters

== Legend ==
Video game platforms
| DROID | Android | iOS | iOS, iPhone, iPod, iPadOS, iPad, visionOS, Apple Vision Pro | NS | Nintendo Switch |
| OSX | macOS | PS4 | PlayStation 4 | PS5 | PlayStation 5 |
| Quest | Meta Quest / Oculus Quest family, including Oculus Rift | Stadia | Google Stadia | WIN | Windows, all versions Windows 95 and up |
| XBO | Xbox One | XBX/S | Xbox Series X/S | | |

Types of releases
| Compilation | A compilation, anthology or collection of several titles, usually (but not always) belonging to the same series |
| Early access | A game launched in early access is unfinished and thus might contain bugs and glitches or have some of the content missing |
| Episodic | An episodic video game that is released in batches over a period of time |
| Expansion | A large-scale DLC to an already existing game that adds new story, areas and additions and/or changes to the game's mechanics |
| Full release | A full release of a game that launched in early access first |
| Limited | A special release (often called "Limited" or "Collector's Edition") with bonus collector's material. Often provided to people who pre-order a game |
| Port | The game first appeared on a different platform and a port was made. The game is like the original, with few or no differences |
| Remake | The game is an enhanced remake of an original, made using a new engine and/or assets and thus containing completely new sound, graphics and possibly changes to the story and/or gameplay |
| Remaster | The game is a remaster of an original, released on the same or different platform, with (usually minor) changes to graphics, sound and/or gameplay |
| Rerelease | The game was re-released on the same platform with no or only minor changes |

== Action RPGs ==
The following list does not contain Soulslike Action RPGs. For a list of these games, see the Soulslike section below

| Year | Title | Platform | Type | Setting | Developer | Publisher | COO | Ref. |
|---|---|---|---|---|---|---|---|---|
| 2020 | Arknights | iOS, DROID | | | Hypergryph, Studio Montagne | Hypergryph, Yostar | | |
| 2020 (WW) | Assassin's Creed Valhalla | WIN, PS4, PS5, XBO, XBX/S, Stadia | Original | Historical, Sci-fi | Ubisoft Montreal | Ubisoft | CA | |
| 2020 | Bakugan: Champions of Vestroia | NS | | | | Warner Bros. Interactive Entertainment | | |
| 2020 | Borderlands 3 | PS5, XBX/S | | | | 2K Games | | |
| 2020 | Borderlands Legendary Collection | NS | | | | 2K Games | | |
| 2020 | Cat Quest + Cat Quest II Pawsome Pack | NS, PS4 | | | | PQube | | |
| 2020 | Chronos: Before the Ashes | WIN, NS, PS4, XBO, Stadia | | | | THQ Nordic | | |
| 2020 | CrossCode | NS, PS4, XBO | | | | Deck13 | | |
| 2020 (WW) | Cyberpunk 2077 | WIN, PS4, XBO, Stadia | Original | Cyberpunk, Sci-fi | CD Projekt Red | CD Projekt | PL | |
| 2020 (WW) | Demon's Souls | PS5 | Remake | Fantasy | Bluepoint Games | Sony Interactive Entertainment | US | |
| 2020 (WW) | Dragon Ball Z: Kakarot | WIN, PS4, XBO | Original | Fantasy | CyberConnect2 | Bandai Namco Entertainment | JP | |
| 2020 (WW) | The Elder Scrolls: Blades | NS | Original | Fantasy | Bethesda Game Studios | Bethesda Softworks | US | |
| 2020 | Fast & Furious Crossroads | WIN, PS4, XBO | | | | Bandai Namco Entertainment | | |
| 2020 | Final Fantasy Crystal Chronicles: Remastered Edition | NS, PS4, iOS, DROID | | | | Square Enix | | |
| 2020 (WW) | Final Fantasy VII Remake | PS4 | Remake | Fantasy | Square Enix Business Division 1 | Square Enix | JP | |
| 2020 (WW) | Genshin Impact | WIN, PS4, iOS, DROID | Original | Fantasy | miHoYo | | CN | |
| 2020 (WW) | Godfall | WIN, PS5 | Original | Fantasy | Counterplay Games | Gearbox Publishing | US | |
| 2020 (WW) | Guardian Tales | NS, IOS, DROID | Original | Fantasy | Kong Studios | Kakao Games, Kong Studios | KR | |
| 2020 | Hellpoint | WIN, PS4, XBO | | | | tinyBuild | | |
| 2020 | Horizon Zero Dawn | WIN | | | | Sony Interactive Entertainment | | |
| 2020 (WW) | Hylics 2 | WIN | Original | Surrealist fantasy | Mason Lindroth | | US | |
| 2020 (WW) | Iron Danger | WIN | Original | Steampunk | Action Squad Studios | Daedalic Entertainment | FI | |
| 2020 | Katana Kami: A Way of the Samurai Story | WIN, NS, PS4 | | | | Spike Chunsoft | | |
| 2020 | Kingdom Hearts Dark Road | iOS, DROID | | | | Square Enix | | |
| 2020 | Kingdom Hearts HD 1.5 + 2.5 Remix | XBO | | | | Square Enix | | |
| 2020 | Kingdom Hearts HD 2.8 Final Chapter Prologue | XBO | | | | Square Enix | | |
| 2020 | Kingdoms of Amalur: Re-Reckoning | WIN, PS4, XBO | | | | THQ Nordic | | |
| 2020 | Maneater | PS4, PS5, XBO, XBX/S, WIN | | | | Deep Silver | | |
| 2020 | Monster Hunter World: Iceborne | WIN | | | Capcom | | | |
| 2020 | Mortal Shell | WIN, PS4, XBO | | | | Playstack | | |
| 2020 | Nioh 2 | PS4 | | | | Koei Tecmo | | |
| 2020 | The Outer Worlds | NS | | | | Private Division | | |
| 2020 (JP) | Punishing: Gray Raven | iOS, DROID | | | | Kuro Games | | |
| 2020 | Sakura Wars | PS4 | | | | Sega | | |
| 2020 | Sword Art Online: Alicization Lycoris | WIN, PS4, XBO | | | | Bandai Namco Entertainment | | |
| 2020 | Torchlight III | NS, WIN, PS4, XBO | | | | Perfect World Entertainment | | |
| 2020 (JP) | Touhou LostWord | iOS, DROID | | | | | | |
| 2020 | Trials of Mana | WIN, NS, PS4 | | | | Square Enix | | |
| 2020 | Warframe | PS5 | | | | Digital Extremes | | |
| 2020 | Warhammer: Chaosbane | PS5, XBX/S | | | | Nacon | | |
| 2020 | Xenoblade Chronicles: Definitive Edition | NS | | | | Nintendo | | |
| 2020 (WW) | Xuan-Yuan Sword VII | WW: WIN; AS: PS4 | | | | Softstar, Justdan International | | |
| 2020 | Ys: Memories of Celceta | PS4 | | | | Xseed Games | | |
| 2021 (WW) | Akiba's Trip: Hellbound & Debriefed | WIN, NS, PS4 | | | Acquire | JP: Acquire; WW: Xseed Games | | |
| 2021 (WW) | Arboria | WIN | Original | Dark fantasy | Dreamplant | All in! Games SA | PL | |
| 2021 (WW) | The Ascent | WIN, XBO, XBX/S | Original | Cyberpunk | Neon Giant | Curve Digital | SE | |
| 2021 | Baldur's Gate: Dark Alliance | WIN, OSX, LIN, PS4, XBO, NS | | | Black Isle Studios | Interplay Entertainment | | |
| 2021 (WW) | Biomutant | WIN, PS4, XBO | Original | Fantasy | Experiments 101 | THQ Nordic | SE | |
| 2021 (WW) | Blue Archive | iOS, DROID | | | Nexon Games | JP: Yostar; WW: Nexon Games | | |
| 2021 | Cookie Run: Kingdom | iOS, DROID, WIN | | | Devsisters | | | |
| 2021 | Curse of the Dead Gods | WIN, NS, PS4, XBO | | | Passtech Games | Focus Home Interactive | | |
| 2021 | Dandy Ace | NS, XBO, WIN | | | Mad Mimic | Neowiz | | |
| 2021 | Darksiders III | NS | | | Gunfire Games | THQ Nordic | | |
| 2021 | Diablo II: Resurrected | WIN, NS, PS4, PS5, XBO, XBX/S | | | Blizzard Entertainment, Vicarious Visions | Blizzard Entertainment | | |
| 2021 | Dragon Ball Z: Kakarot | NS | | | CyberConnect2 | Bandai Namco Entertainment | | |
| 2021 | Dragon Quest Builders 2 | XBO | | | Square Enix | | | |
| 2021 (WW) | Dungeons & Dragons: Dark Alliance | WIN, PS4, PS5, XBO, XBX/S | Original | Fantasy | Tuque Games | Wizards of the Coast | CA | |
| 2021 (WW) | Eastward | WIN, OSX, NS | Original | Sci-fi, Post-apocalyptic | Pixpil | Chucklefish | CN | |
| 2021 | Echo Generation | XBO, XBX/S | | | Cococucumber | | | |
| 2021 | Fallen Legion: Revenants | NS, PS4 | | | YummyYummyTummy | NIS America | | |
| 2021 | Final Fantasy VII Remake Intergrade | WIN, PS5 | | | Square Enix | | | |
| 2021 | Garden Story | WIN, OSX, NS | | | Picogram | Rose City Games | | |
| 2021 | Genshin Impact | PS5 | | | MiHoYo | | | |
| 2021 | Godfall | PS4 | | | Counterplay Games | Gearbox Publishing | | |
| 2021 (JP,CN) | Guardian Tales | NS, IOS, DROID | Original | Fantasy | Kong Studios | CN: Bilibili; JP: Kong Studios, Yostar | KR | |
| 2021 | Hellpoint | NS | | | Cradle Games | tinyBuild | | |
| 2021 | King of Seas | WIN, NS, PS4, XBO | | | 3DClouds | Team17 | | |
| 2021 | Kingdom Hearts HD 1.5 Remix | WIN | | | Square Enix | | | |
| 2021 | Kingdom Hearts HD 2.5 Remix | WIN | | | Square Enix | | | |
| 2021 | Kingdom Hearts HD 2.8 Final Chapter Prologue | WIN | | | Square Enix | | | |
| 2021 | Kingdom Hearts III + Re Mind | WIN | | | Square Enix | | | |
| 2021 | Kingdoms of Amalur: Re-Reckoning | NS | | | Kaiko | THQ Nordic | | |
| 2021 | Legend of Mana | WIN, NS, PS4 | | | Square Enix | | | |
| 2021 | The Legend of Nayuta: Boundless Trails (Note: Available worldwide; no English audio/dub, only Japanese.) | WIN | | | Nihon Falcom, PH3 GmbH | NIS America | | |
| 2021 | The Legend of Sword and Fairy 7 | WIN | | | Softstar | CubeGame | | |
| 2021 (JP) | Maglam Lord | NS, PS4 | | | Felistella | D3 Publisher | | |
| 2021 | Maneater | NS | | | Tripwire Interactive | Tripwire Interactive, Deep Silver | | |
| 2021 | Mary Skelter Finale | NS, PS4 | | | Compile Heart | Idea Factory International | | |
| 2021 | Mass Effect Legendary Edition | WIN, PS4, XBO | | | BioWare | Electronic Arts | | |
| 2021 (WW) | Monster Hunter Rise | NS | Original | | Capcom | | JP | |
| 2021 | Mortal Shell: Enhanced Edition | PS5, XBX/S | | | Cold Symmetry | Playstack | | |
| 2021 (JP) | Nayuta no Kiseki Kai | PS4 | | | Nihon Falcom | | | |
| 2021 | Neo: The World Ends with You | NS, PS4, WIN | | | Square Enix, h.a.n.d. | Square Enix | | |
| 2021 | Nier Replicant ver.1.22474487139... | WIN, PS4, XBO | | | Toylogic | Square Enix | | |
| 2021 | Nioh 2 - The Complete Edition | WIN, PS4 | | | Team Ninja | Sony Interactive Entertainment / Koei Tecmo | | |
| 2021 | Nioh 2 Remastered - The Complete Edition | PS5 | | | Team Ninja | Sony Interactive Entertainment / Koei Tecmo | | |
| 2021 | Nioh Remastered - The Complete Edition | PS5 | | | Team Ninja | Sony Interactive Entertainment / Koei Tecmo | | |
| 2021 | Phantasy Star Online 2: New Genesis | NA: WIN, XBO, XBX/S; JP: WIN, NS, PS4 | | | Sega Online R&D | Sega | | |
| 2021 | Poison Control | NS, PS4 | | | Nippon Ichi Software | | | |
| 2021 | Punishing: Gray Raven | iOS, DROID | | | Kuro Games | | | |
| 2021 | Rogue Heroes: Ruins of Tasos | WIN, NS | | | Heliocentric Studios | Team17 | | |
| 2021 (WW) | Sands of Salzaar | WIN | Original | Fantasy | Han-Squirrel Studio | XD | CN | |
| 2021 | Save Me Mr Tako: Definitive Edition | WIN, NS | | | Deneos Games | Deneos Games, Limited Run Games | | |
| 2021 | Scarlet Nexus | WIN, PS4, PS5, XBO, XBX/S | | | Bandai Namco Studios | Bandai Namco Entertainment | | |
| 2021 | Sword of Vermilion | NS | | | | | | |
| 2021 | Tails of Iron | WIN, NS, PS4, PS5, XBO, XBX/S | | | Odd Bug Studio | United Label | | |
| 2021 | Tales of Arise | WIN, PS4, PS5, XBO, XBX/S | | | Bandai Namco Studios | Bandai Namco Entertainment | | |
| 2021 | Tales of Luminaria | iOS, DROID | | | Bandai Namco Studios | Bandai Namco Entertainment | | |
| 2021 | Tiny Tina's Assault on Dragon Keep: A Wonderlands One-Shot Adventure | WIN, PS4, PS5, XBO, XBX/S | | | Gearbox Software, Stray Kite Studios | 2K Games | | |
| 2021 | Touhou LostWord | iOS, DROID | | | | | | |
| 2021 | Vaporum: Lockdown | NS | | | Fatbot Games | | | |
| 2021 | Werewolf: The Apocalypse – Earthblood | WIN, PS4, PS5, XBO, XBX/S | | | Cyanide | Nacon | | |
| 2021 | Xuan-Yuan Sword VII | PS4, XBO | | | Softstar, DOMO Studio, Yooreka Studio | eastasiasoft | | |
| 2021 (WW) | Ys IX: Monstrum Nox | WIN, NS, PS4 | | | Nihon Falcom | NIS America | | |
| 2021 | Zengeon | NS | | | IndieLeague Studio | PQube | | |
| 2022 | .hack//G.U. Last Recode | NS | | | CyberConnect2 | Bandai Namco Entertainment | | |
| 2022 | ANNO: Mutationem | NS, WIN, PS4, PS5 | | | ThinkingStars | Lightning Games | | |
| 2022 | The Ascent | PS4, PS5 | | | Neon Giant | Curve Digital | | |
| 2022 | Astlibra Revision | WIN | | | KEIZO | WhisperGames | | |
| 2022 | Astro Aqua Kitty | PS5 | | | Tikipod | | | |
| 2022 (WW) | Babylon's Fall | WIN, PS4, PS5 | Original | Fantasy | PlatinumGames | Square Enix | JP | |
| 2022 | Baldur's Gate: Dark Alliance II | WIN, OSX, LIN, NS, PS4, PS5, XBO, XBX/S | | | Black Isle Studios | Interplay Entertainment | | |
| 2022 | Biomutant | PS5, XBX/S | | | Experiment 101 | THQ Nordic | | |
| 2022 | Black Witchcraft | WIN | | | Quattro Gear | Crest | | |
| 2022 | Captain Velvet Meteor: The Jump+ Dimensions | NS | | | Shueisha | | | |
| 2022 | Crisis Core: Final Fantasy VII Reunion | WIN, NS, PS4, PS5, XBO, XBX/S | | | Square Enix | | | |
| 2022 (WW) | Crystar | NS | | | Gemdrops | JP: FuRyu; WW: NIS America | | |
| 2022 | Crystarise | WIN | | | Yukiusagi Games | | | |
| 2022 (JP) | Custom Robo | NS | | | | | | |
| 2022 (JP) | Custom Robo V2 | NS | | | | | | |
| 2022 | Cyberpunk 2077 | PS5, XBX/S | | | CD Projekt Red | | | |
| 2022 | Diablo Immortal | iOS, DROID, WIN | | | Blizzard Entertainment, NetEase | Blizzard Entertainment | | |
| 2022 | Disney Mirrorverse | iOS, DROID | | | Kabam | | | |
| 2022 | Dolmen | WIN, PS4, PS5, XBO, XBX/S | | | Massive Work Studio | Prime Matter | | |
| 2022 | Dragon Quest Builders | iOS, DROID | | | Square Enix | | | |
| 2022 | Dragon Quest Treasures | NS | | | Tose | Square Enix | | |
| 2022 | Dungeon Defenders: Awakened | PS4 | | | Chromatic Games | | | |
| 2022 | Dungeon Munchies | PS4, PS5, WIN, OSX, NS | | | Majaja | Chorus Worldwide | | |
| 2022 (WW) | Dusk Diver 2 | NS, PS4, PS5, WIN | | | WANIN Games | JP: Justdan International; WW: Idea Factory | | |
| 2022 | Dying Light 2 Stay Human | WIN, NS, PS4, PS5, XBO, XBX/S | Original | | Techland | | | |
| 2022 | Echoes of Mana | iOS, DROID | | | WFS | Square Enix | | |
| 2022 | Eiyuden Chronicle: Rising | WIN, NS, PS4, PS5, XBO, XBX/S | | | Rabbit & Bear Studios | 505 Games | | |
| 2022 (WW) | Elden Ring | WIN, PS4, PS5, XBO, XBX/S | Original | Dark fantasy | FromSoftware | Bandai Namco Entertainment | JP | |
| 2022 (WW) | ELEX II | WIN, PS4, PS5, XBO, XBX/S | Original | Post-apocalyptic, Sci-fi | Piranha Bytes | THQ Nordic | DE | |
| 2022 | Fallen Angel | NS | | | Matrioshka Games | V Publishing | | |
| 2022 (EU/NA) | Fallen Legion Revenants | WIN, PS5, XBO, XBX/S | | | YummyYummyTummy | NIS America | | |
| 2022 (EU/NA) | Fallen Legion: Rise to Glory | WIN, PS5, XBO, XBX/S | | | YummyYummyTummy | NIS America | | |
| 2022 | Final Fantasy VII Remake Intergrade | WIN | | | Square Enix | | | |
| 2022 | Garden Story | XBO | | | Picogram | Kowloon Nights, Rose City Games | | |
| 2022 | Godfall: Ultimate Edition | WIN, PS4, PS5, XBO, XBX/S | | | Counterplay Games | Gearbox Publishing | | |
| 2022 | Gotham Knights | WIN, PS5, XBX/S | Original | | WB Games Montréal | Warner Bros. Interactive Entertainment | | |
| 2022 | Hellpoint | PS5, XBX/S | | | Cradle Games | tinyBuild | | |
| 2022 | Kingdom Hearts Integrum Masterpiece for Cloud | NS | | | Square Enix | | | |
| 2022 | The Last Oricru | WIN, PS5, XBX/S | | | GoldKnights | Prime Matter | | |
| 2022 (JP) | The Legend of Nayuta: Boundless Trails | NS | | | PH3 GmbH | Nippon Ichi Software | | |
| 2022 | Lost Epic | WIN, PS4, PS5 | | | Team Earth Wars | One or Eight | | |
| 2022 (WW) | Made in Abyss: Binary Star Falling into Darkness | WIN, NS, PS4 | | | Chime Corporation | Spike Chunsoft | | |
| 2022 | Maglam Lord | NS, PS4 | | | Felistella | PQube | | |
| 2022 (JP) | Megaton Musashi X | NS, PS4, PS5 | | | Level-5 | | | |
| 2022 | Monster Hunter Rise | WIN | | | Capcom | | | |
| 2022 | Monster Hunter Rise: Sunbreak | WIN, NS | | | Capcom | | | |
| 2022 | Mortal Shell: Complete Edition | NS | | | Cold Symmetry | Playstack | | |
| 2022 (WW) | Mount & Blade II: Bannerlord | WIN, PS4, PS5, XBO, XBX/S | Original | Historical | TaleWorlds Entertainment | Prime Matter | TR | |
| 2022 | My Hero: Ultra Impact | iOS, DROID | | | Bandai Namco Entertainment | | | |
| 2022 | Nier: Automata The End of Yorha Edition | NS | | | Virtuos | Square Enix | | |
| 2022 | No Place for Bravery | WIN, NS | | | Glitch Factory | Ysbyrd Games | | |
| 2022 | Nobody Saves the World | NS, PS4, PS5, WIN, XBO, XBX/S | | | Drinkbox Studios | | | |
| 2022 | Outriders Worldslayer | WIN, PS4, PS5, XBO, XBX/S, Stadia | | | People Can Fly | Square Enix | | |
| 2022 | Pascal's Wager: Definitive Edition | NS | | | TipsWorks | Yooreka Studio | | |
| 2022 | Phantasy Star Online 2 | PS4 | | | Sega Online R&D | Sega | | |
| 2022 | Phantasy Star Online 2: New Genesis | PS4 | | | Sega Online R&D | Sega | | |
| 2022 | Pokémon Legends: Arceus | NS | | | Game Freak | The Pokémon Company, Nintendo | | |
| 2022 | Record of Lodoss War: Deedlit in Wonder Labyrinth | NS | | | Team Ladybug, WSS Playground | Playism, WSS Playground | | |
| 2022 | RimWorld Console Edition | PS4, XBO | | | Double Eleven | | | |
| 2022 | RPGolf Legends | WIN, NS, PS4, PS5, XBO | | | ArticNet | Kemco | | |
| 2022 | Ruinsmagus | WIN | | | CharacterBank | CharacterBank, Mastiff | | |
| 2022 | Salt and Sacrifice | WIN, PS4, PS5 | | | Ska Studios | | | |
| 2022 | SD Gundam Battle Alliance | WIN, NS, PS4, PS5, XBO, XBX/S | | | Artdink | Bandai Namco Entertainment | | |
| 2022 | Souldiers | WIN, NS, PS4, PS5, XBO, XBX/S | | | Retro Forge | Dear Villagers | | |
| 2022 | Star Ocean: The Divine Force | WIN, PS4, PS5, XBO, XBX/S | | | Tri-Ace | Square Enix | | |
| 2022 | Stranger of Paradise: Final Fantasy Origin | WIN, PS4, PS5, XBO, XBX/S | | | Team Ninja | Square Enix | | |
| 2022 | Sword and Fairy: Together Forever | PS4, PS5, XBO, XBX/S | | | Softstar | eastasiasoft, E-Home Entertainment | | |
| 2022 (WW) | Sword Art Online: Alicization Lycoris | NS | | | Aquria | Bandai Namco Entertainment | | |
| 2022 | Sword of the Vagrant | NS, PS4, XBO | | | O.T.K. Games | Rainy Frog | | |
| 2022 | The Witcher 3: Wild Hunt | PS5, XBX/S | | | CD Projekt Red | | | |
| 2022 (WW) | Thymesia | WIN, NS, PS5, XBX/S | Original | Fantasy | OverBorder Studio | Team17 | TW | |
| 2022 | Tiny Tina's Wonderlands | WIN, PS4, PS5, XBO, XBX/S | | | Gearbox Software | 2K Games | | |
| 2022 | Touhou Shoujo: Tale of Beautiful Memories | NS | | | The N Main Shop | Mediascape | | |
| 2022 | Tribes of Midgard | NS, XBO, XBX/S | | | Norsfell Games | Gearbox Publishing | | |
| 2022 (JP) | Trinity Trigger | NS, PS4, PS5 | | | Three Rings | FuRyu | | |
| 2022 | Undecember | WIN, iOS, DROID | | | Needs Games | Line Games Corporation | | |
| 2022 | Valkyrie Elysium | PS4, PS5, WIN | | | Soleil | Square Enix | | |
| 2022 (JP) | Void Terrarium 2 | NS, PS4 | | | Nippon Ichi Software | | | |
| 2022 | Weird West | WIN, PS4, XBO | | | WolfEye Studios | Devolver Digital | | |
| 2022 | Wonder Boy Collection | NS, PS4 | | | Bliss Brain | ININ Games | | |
| 2022 | Xenoblade Chronicles 3 | NS | | | Monolith Soft | Nintendo | | |
| 2022 (EU/NA) | Ys VIII: Lacrimosa of Dana | PS5 | | | Nihon Falcom | NIS America | | |
| 2023 | Achilles: Legends Untold | WIN, PS5, XBX/S | | | Dark Point Games | | | |
| 2023 | Asgard's Wrath 2 | Quest | | | Sanzaru Games | Oculus Studios | | |
| 2023 | Astlibra Revision | NS | | | KEIZO | WhisperGames | | |
| 2023 | Atlas Fallen | WIN, PS5, XBX/S | | | Deck13 Interactive | Focus Entertainment | | |
| 2023 | Atomic Heart | WIN, PS4, PS5, XBO, XBX/S | | | Mundfish | Focus Entertainment | | |
| 2023 | Baldur's Gate: Dark Alliance | iOS, DROID | | | Interplay Entertainment | | | |
| 2023 | Bleak Faith: Forsaken | WIN | | | Archangel Studios | | | |
| 2023 (JP) | Blue Protocol | WIN | | | Bandai Namco Online | Amazon Games | | |
| 2023 | Born of Bread | WIN, NS, PS5, XBX/S | | | Wild Arts | Dear Villagers | | |
| 2023 | Clash: Artifacts of Chaos | WIN, PS4, PS5, XBO, XBX/S | | | ACE Team | Nacon | | |
| 2023 (CN) | Cookie Run: Kingdom | iOS, DROID, WIN | | | Devsisters, Tencent Games | | | |
| 2023 (WW) | Crymachina | NS, PS4, PS5 | | | Aquria | JP: FuRyu; WW: NIS America | | |
| 2023 | Dead Island 2 | WIN, PS4, PS5, XBO, XBX/S | | | Dambuster Studios | Deep Silver | | |
| 2023 (WW) | Diablo IV | WIN, PS4, PS5, XBO, XBX/S | Original | Fantasy | Blizzard Entertainment | | US | |
| 2023 | Dragon Ball Z: Kakarot | PS5, XBX/S | | | CyberConnect2 | Bandai Namco Entertainment | | |
| 2023 | Dragon Quest Treasures | WIN | | | Tose | Square Enix | | |
| 2023 | Dwerve | NS | | | Half Human Games | | | |
| 2023 | Eastern Exorcist | NS, PS4, XBO | | | Wildfire Game | Bilibili | | |
| 2023 | Everspace 2 | WIN | | | Rockfish Games | | | |
| 2023 | Evil Wizard | WIN, XBO, XBX/S | | | Rubber Duck Games | E-Home Entertainment | | |
| 2023 | Fae Farm | WIN, NS | | | Phoenix Labs | | | |
| 2023 (WW) | Fate/Samurai Remnant | WIN, NS, PS4, PS5 | | | Omega Force, Kou Shibusawa | Koei Tecmo | | |
| 2023 | Final Fantasy VII: Ever Crisis | iOS, DROID, WIN | | | Applibot, Square Enix | Square Enix | | |
| 2023 | Final Fantasy XVI | PS5 | | | Square Enix | | | |
| 2023 | Forspoken | WIN, PS5 | | | Luminous Productions | Square Enix | | |
| 2023 | Goddess of Victory: Nikke | WIN | | | Shift Up | Level Infinite | | |
| 2023 | Gothic Classic | NS | | | Piranha Bytes | THQ Nordic | | |
| 2023 | Gothic II Complete Classic | NS | | | Piranha Bytes | THQ Nordic | | |
| 2023 | Hammerwatch 2 | NS, PS5, WIN | | | Crackshell | Modus Games | | |
| 2023 (WW) | Hogwarts Legacy | NS, PS4, PS5, XBO, XBX/S, WIN | Original | Fantasy | Avalanche Software | Warner Bros. Games | US | |
| 2023 | Infinity Strash: Dragon Quest The Adventure of Dai | WIN, NS, PS4, PS5, XBX/S | | | Game Studio, Kai Graphics | Square Enix | | |
| 2023 | Iron Danger | PS5, XBX/S | | | Action Squad Studios | Daedalic Entertainment | | |
| 2023 | Jujutsu Kaisen: Phantom Parade | OSX, iOS, DROID | | | Sumzap | | | |
| 2023 | Killsquad | PS4, PS5 | | | Novarama | | | |
| 2023 | Knight vs Giant: The Broken Excalibur | WIN, NS, PS5, XBX/S | | | Gambir Studio | PQube | | |
| 2023 | Labyrinth of Galleria: The Moon Society | WIN, NS, PS4, PS5 | | | Nippon Ichi Software | | | |
| 2023 (WW) | The Legend of Nayuta: Boundless Trails | WIN, NS, PS4 | | | Nihon Falcom | NIS America | | |
| 2023 | Lords of the Fallen | WIN, PS5, XBX/S | | | Hexworks | CI Games | | |
| 2023 | Mega Man X DiVE Offline | WIN, iOS, DROID | | | Capcom | | | |
| 2023 | Monster Hunter Now | iOS, DROID | | | Niantic | Capcom | | |
| 2023 | Monster Hunter Rise | PS4, PS5, XBO, XBX/S | | | Capcom | | | |
| 2023 | My Time at Sandrock | WIN, NS, PS4, PS5, XBO, XBX/S | | | Pathea Games | PM Studios | | |
| 2023 | MythForce | WIN, NS, PS4, PS5, XBO, XBX/S | | | Beamdog | Aspyr | | |
| 2023 | Oceanhorn 2: Knights of the Lost Realm | WIN, PS5, XBX/S | | | Comfox & Bros | Fireplace Games | | |
| 2023 | The Outer Worlds: Spacer's Choice Edition | PS5, XBX/S | | | Obsidian Entertainment | Private Division | | |
| 2023 | Phantom Blade: Executioners | WIN, PS4, PS5, iOS, DROID | | | S-GAME | | | |
| 2023 | Punishing: Gray Raven | WIN | | | Kuro Games | | | |
| 2023 | Quest for Camelot | NS | | | | | | |
| 2023 | Ravenbound | WIN | | | Systemic Reaction | | | |
| 2023 (JP) | Rear Sekai | NS | | | Hakama | Bushiroad | | |
| 2023 | Remnant: From the Ashes | NS | | | Gunfire Games | Perfect World Entertainment | | |
| 2023 | Risen | NS, PS4, XBO | | | Piranha Bytes | THQ Nordic | | |
| 2023 | Romancelvania | WIN, PS5, XBX/S | | | The Deep End Games | 2124 Publishing | | |
| 2023 | Salt and Sacrifice | NS | | | Ska Studios, Devoured Studios | Ska Studios | | |
| 2023 (WW) | Silent Hope | WIN, NS | | | Marvelous | Marvelous, Xseed Games | | |
| 2023 | Star Ocean: The Second Story R | WIN, NS, PS4, PS5 | | | Gemdrops | Square Enix | | |
| 2023 (WW) | Starfield | WIN, XBX/S | Original | Sci-fi | Bethesda Game Studios | Bethesda Softworks | US | |
| 2023 | Stray Blade | WIN, PS5, XBX/S | | | Point Blank | 505 Games | | |
| 2023 (WW) | Sword Art Online: Last Recollection | WIN, PS4, PS5, XBO, XBX/S | | | Aquria | Bandai Namco Entertainment | | |
| 2023 (WW) | Tales of Symphonia Remastered | NS, PS4, XBO | | | Bandai Namco Entertainment Romania | Bandai Namco Entertainment | | |
| 2023 | Thirsty Suitors | WIN, NS, PS4, PS5, XBO, XBX/S | | | Outerloop Games | Annapurna Interactive | | |
| 2023 (JP) | Tokyo Xanadu eX+ | NS | | | Nihon Falcom | | | |
| 2023 | Torchlight: Infinite | iOS, DROID | | | XD Games | | | |
| 2023 | Touhou: New World | PS4, PS5, WIN, NS | | | Ankake Spa | Xseed Games | | |
| 2023 | Tower of Fantasy | PS4, PS5 | | | Hotta Studio | Perfect World | | |
| 2023 (EU/NA) | Trinity Trigger | WIN, NS, PS4, PS5 | | | Three Rings | Xseed Games, Marvelous | | |
| 2023 (WW) | void tRrLM2(); Void Terrarium 2 | NS, PS4 | | | Nippon Ichi Software | | | |
| 2023 | Weird West: Definitive Edition | PS5, XBX/S | | | WolfEye Studios | Devolver Digital | | |
| 2023 | Wild Hearts | WIN, PS5, XBX/S | | | Omega Force | Electronic Arts | | |
| 2023 | Wo Long: Fallen Dynasty | WIN, PS4, PS5, XBO, XBX/S | | | Team Ninja | Koei Tecmo | | |
| 2023 | Wolcen: Lords of Mayhem | PS4, XBO | | | Wolcen Studio | | | |
| 2023 | WrestleQuest | WIN, NS, PS4, PS5, XBO, XBX/S, iOS, DROID | | | Mega Cat Studios | Skybound Games | | |
| 2023 (JP) | Ys Memoire: The Oath in Felghana | NS | | | Nihon Falcom | | | |
| 2023 (JP) | Ys X: Nordics | NS, PS4, PS5 | | | Nihon Falcom | | | |
| 2024 | Astlibra Gaiden: The Cave of Phantom Mist | NS | | | KEIZO | WhisperGames | | |
| 2024 | Astor: Blade of the Monolith | WIN, NS, PS4, PS5, XBO, XBX/S | | | C2 Game Studio | Versus Evil | | |
| 2024 | Banishers: Ghosts of New Eden | WIN, PS5, XBX/S | Original | | Don't Nod | Focus Entertainment | | |
| 2024 | Berserk Boy | WIN, NS | | | BerserkBoy Games | | | |
| 2024 | Biomutant | NS | Port | | Experiment 101 | THQ Nordic | | |
| 2024 | Black Myth: Wukong | WIN, PS5 | Original | | Game Science | | | |
| 2024 | Bleak Faith: Forsaken | PS5, XBX/S | | | Archangel Studios | Perp Games | | |
| 2024 | Cat Quest III | WIN, NS, PS4, PS5, XBO, XBX/S | | | The Gentlebros | Kepler Interactive | | |
| 2024 | Crystal Story: Dawn of Dusk | WIN | | | Bred Frown | | | |
| 2024 (WW) | Crystar | PS5 | | | Gemdrops | Spike Chunsoft | | |
| 2024 | Darksiders II: Deathinitive Edition | PS5, XBX/S | Remaster | | Gunfire Games | THQ Nordic | | |
| 2024 | Destiny 2: The Final Shape | WIN, PS4, PS5, XBO, XBX/S | | | Bungie | | | |
| 2024 | Diablo IV: Vessel of Hatred | WIN, PS4, PS5, XBO, XBX/S | Expansion | | Blizzard Entertainment | | | |
| 2024 (WW) | Dragon Age: The Veilguard | WIN, XBX/S, PS5 | Original | Fantasy | BioWare | Electronic Arts | US | |
| 2024 | Dragon Ball Xenoverse 2 | PS5, XBX/S | | | Dimps | Bandai Namco Entertainment | | |
| 2024 (WW) | Dragon's Dogma 2 | WIN, PS5, XBX/S | Original | | Capcom | | JP | |
| 2024 (WW) | Dread Delusion | WIN | Original | Fantasy | Lovely Hellplace | DreadXP | UK | |
| 2024 | Drova: Forsaken Kin | WIN, LIN, NS, PS4, PS5, XBO, XBX/S | | | Just2D | Deck13 | | |
| 2024 | Dungeons of Hinterberg | WIN, XBX/S | | | Microbird | Curve Games | | |
| 2024 | Dwerve | PS5 | | | Half Human Games | PM Studios | | |
| 2024 | Elden Ring Shadow of the Erdtree | WIN, PS4, PS5, XBO, XBX/S | Expansion | | FromSoftware | Bandai Namco Entertainment | | |
| 2024 | Elrentaros Wanderings | WIN, NS | | | Hakama | Bushiroad | | |
| 2024 | Eternights | NS | | | Studio Sai | | | |
| 2024 | Farmagia | WIN, NS, PS5 | | | Marvelous | Marvelous, Marvelous Europe, Marvelous USA | | |
| 2024 | Fate Seeker II | PS5, XBO, XBX/S | | | JSL Entertainment | Niugamer | | |
| 2024 | Final Fantasy XVI | WIN | Port | | Square Enix | | | |
| 2024 | Flintlock: The Siege of Dawn | WIN, PS4, PS5, XBO, XBX/S | | | A44 | Kepler Interactive | | |
| 2024 | Genshin Impact | XBX/S | Port | | MiHoYo | | | |
| 2024 (WW) | Granblue Fantasy: Relink | WIN, PS4, PS5 | Original | Fantasy | Osaka Cygames | Cygames | JP | |
| 2024 (WW) | GreedFall 2: The Dying World | WIN, XBX/S, PS5 | Early access | Fantasy | Spiders | Nacon | FR | |
| 2024 | Hammerwatch 2 | PS4, XBX/S | | | Crackshell | Modus Games | | |
| 2024 | Horizon Forbidden West Complete Edition | WIN | Port | | Guerrilla Games, Nixxes Software | Sony Interactive Entertainment | | |
| 2024 | Horizon Zero Dawn Remastered | WIN, PS5 | Remaster | | Guerrilla Games | Sony Interactive Entertainment | | |
| 2024 (JP) | Kaeru no Tame ni Kane wa Naru | NS | Port | | Intelligent Systems, Nintendo R&D1 | Nintendo | | |
| 2024 | Kingdom Come: Deliverance | NS | Port | | Warhorse Studios, Saber Interactive | Saber Interactive | | |
| 2024 | Kingdom: The Blood | WIN, iOS, DROID | | | Action Square | Action Square, YJM Games | | |
| 2024 | Last Epoch | WIN | | | Eleventh Hour Games | | | |
| 2024 | Legend of Mana | XBX/S | Port | | Square Enix | | | |
| 2024 (JP) | Mado Monogatari: Fia and the Wondrous Academy | NS, PS4, PS5 | | | Sting Entertainment, D4 Enterprise | Compile Heart | | |
| 2024 | Neptunia Game Maker R:Evolution | NS, PS4, PS5, XBX/S | | | Compile Heart | Idea Factory International | | |
| 2024 | Neptunia: Sisters VS Sisters | XBO, XBX/S, NS | Port | | Compile Heart | Idea Factory International | | |
| 2024 (WW) | Path of Exile 2 | WIN, PS5, XBX/S | Early access | | Grinding Gear Games | | NZ | |
| 2024 (JP) | Re:Zero − Starting Life in Another World: Witch's Re:surrection | iOS, DROID | | | Elemental Craft | Kadokawa Corporation | | |
| 2024 | Reynatis | WIN, NS, PS4, PS5 | | | FuRyu, Natsume Atari | JP: FuRyu; WW: NIS America | | |
| 2024 | Rise of the Rōnin | PS5 | Original | | Team Ninja | Sony Interactive Entertainment | | |
| 2024 | Sand Land | WIN, PS4, PS5, XBX/S | | | ILCA | Bandai Namco Entertainment | | |
| 2024 | Save Me Mr Tako: Definitive Edition | PS4 | Port | | Deneos Games | Limited Run Games | | |
| 2024 | Soul Covenant | WIN, PS5 | | | Thirdverse | | | |
| 2024 | South Park: Snow Day! | WIN, NS, PS5, XBX/S | | | Question | THQ Nordic | | |
| 2024 | Starfield: Shattered Space | WIN, XBX/S | Expansion | | Bethesda Game Studios | Bethesda Softworks | | |
| 2024 | Starseed: Asnia Trigger | iOS, DROID | | | JoyCity | Com2uS | | |
| 2024 | That Time I Got Reincarnated as a Slime Isekai Chronicles | WIN, NS, PS4, PS5, XBO, XBX/S | | | ZOC, Monkeycraft | Bandai Namco Entertainment | | |
| 2024 (JP) | Tokyo Revengers: Last Mission | WIN, iOS, DROID | | | Victor Entertainment | | | |
| 2024 | Tokyo Xanadu eX+ | NS | | | Nihon Falcom | Aksys Games | | |
| 2024 | Touhou Shoujo: Tale of Beautiful Memories | PS4 | | | The N Main Shop | Mediascape | | |
| 2024 | Trials of Mana | XBX/S | Port | | Square Enix | | | |
| 2024 | Visions of Mana | WIN, PS4, PS5, XBX/S | Original | | Ouka Studios | Square Enix | | |
| 2024 | Wayfinder | WIN, PS5 | Full release | | Airship Syndicate | | | |
| 2024 (CN) | Where Winds Meet | WIN | | | Everstone Studio | | | |
| 2024 | Wuthering Waves | WIN, iOS, DROID | Original | | Kuro Games | | | |
| 2024 | Xuan-Yuan Sword VII | NS | | | Softstar, DOMO Studio | eastasiasoft | | |
| 2024 | Xuan-Yuan Sword: The Gate of Firmament | PS5 | | | Softstar, DOMO Studio | eastasiasoft | | |
| 2024 | Ys Memoire: The Oath in Felghana | PS4, PS5 | | | Nihon Falcom | | | |
| 2024 | Ys X: Nordics | WIN, NS, PS4, PS5 | | | Nihon Falcom | NIS America | | |
| 2024 | Zenless Zone Zero | WIN, iOS, DROID, PS5 | Original | | miHoYo | CN: miHoYo; WW: Cognosphere | | |
| 2025 | Achilles: Legends Untold | NS | | | Dark Point Games | | | |
| 2025 | AI Limit | WIN, PS5 | | | SenseGames | CE-Asia | | |
| 2025 | Alterna Vvelt: Blue Exorcist Another Story | iOS, DROID | Original | | Aniplex | | | |
| 2025 | Anima: Gate of Memories I & II Remaster | WIN, PS5, XBX/S | Remaster, Compilation | | Anima Project | | | |
| 2025 (JP) | Artdink Game Log: Tail of the Sun | WIN, NS | | | Artdink | | | |
| 2025 | Atelier Yumia: The Alchemist of Memories & the Envisioned Land | WIN, NS, PS4, PS5, XBO, XBX/S | | | Gust | Koei Tecmo | | |
| 2025 (WW) | Avowed | WIN, XBX/S | Original | Fantasy | Obsidian Entertainment | Xbox Game Studios | US | |
| 2025 | Bittersweet Birthday | WIN, OSX, LIN | | | World Eater Games | Dangen Entertainment | | |
| 2025 | Black Myth: Wukong | XBX/S | Port | | Game Science | | | |
| 2025 (WW) | Cladun X3 | WIN, NS, PS4, PS5 | | | Nippon Ichi Software | JP: Nippon Ichi Software; WW: NIS America | | |
| 2025 | Coridden | WIN | Original | | Aftnareld | Anshar Publishing | | |
| 2025 | Crashlands 2 | WIN, iOS, DROID | | | Butterscotch Shenanigans | | | |
| 2025 (JP) | Crystar | PS5 | | | Gemdrops | FuRyu | | |
| 2025 | Cyberpunk 2077 | OSX | Port | | CD Projekt Red | CD Projekt | | |
| 2025 | Cyberpunk 2077: Ultimate Edition | NS2 | Port | | CD Projekt Red | CD Projekt | | |
| 2025 | Decision: Red Daze | PS5, XBX/S | | | FlyAnvil | Nordcurrent | | |
| 2025 | Destiny: Rising | iOS, DROID | Original | | NetEase Games | | | |
| 2025 | Duet Night Abyss | WIN, iOS, DROID | | | Pan Studio | Hero Games | | |
| 2025 | Dungeons of Hinterberg | PS4, PS5 | | | Microbird | Curve Games | | |
| 2025 | Edens Zero | WIN, PS5, XBX/S | | | Konami Digital Entertainment | | | |
| 2025 | Elden Ring Nightreign | WIN, PS4, PS5, XBO, XBX/S | Original | | FromSoftware | Bandai Namco Entertainment | | |
| 2025 | The Elder Scrolls V: Skyrim Anniversary Edition | NS2 | Port | | Bethesda Game Studios | Bethesda Softworks | | |
| 2025 | Empyreal | WIN, PS5, XBX/S | | | Silent Games | Secret Mode | | |
| 2025 | Fallout 4: Anniversary Edition | WIN, PS5, XBX/S | Rerelease | | Bethesda Game Studios | Bethesda Softworks | | |
| 2025 | Fate: Reawakened | WIN, NS, PS4, PS5, XBO, XBX/S | Remaster, Compilation | | gamigo, Tableflip Entertainment | gamigo, WildTangent | | |
| 2025 | Final Fantasy VII Rebirth | WIN | Port | | Square Enix | | | |
| 2025 | Final Fantasy XVI | XBX/S | Port | | Square Enix | | | |
| 2025 | The First Berserker: Khazan | WIN, PS5, XBX/S | | | Neople | Nexon | | |
| 2025 | Freedom Wars Remastered | WIN, NS, PS4, PS5 | Remaster | | Dimps | Bandai Namco Entertainment | | |
| 2025 | Hades II | WIN, OSX, NS, NS2 | Full release | | Supergiant Games | | | |
| 2025 | Heroes of Hammerwatch 2 | WIN | | | Crackshell | | | |
| 2025 | Hogwarts Legacy | NS2 | Port | | Avalanche Software | Portkey Games | | |
| 2025 | HYKE: Northern Light(s) | WIN, NS, PS5 | | | Blast Edge Games | Akatsuki Games, Aniplex | | |
| 2025 | Is It Wrong to Try to Pick Up Girls in a Dungeon?: Fullland of Water and Light | WIN, NS | | | Bushiroad Games | | | |
| 2025 (WW) | Kingdom Come: Deliverance II | WIN, PS5, XBX/S | Original | Historical | Warhorse Studios | Deep Silver | CZ | |
| 2025 (WW) | The Legend of Heroes: Trails Through Daybreak II | WIN, NS, PS4, PS5 | | | Nihon Falcom | NIS America | | |
| 2025 | Legendary Hoplite | NS, PS4, PS5, XBO, XBX/S | | | TripleBricksGames | Ravenage | | |
| 2025 | The Lonesome Guild | WIN, PS5, XBX/S | | | Tiny Bull Studios | Don't Nod | | |
| 2025 | Lost Soul Aside | WIN, PS5 | Original | | Ultizero Games | Sony Interactive Entertainment | | |
| 2025 (JP) | Magical Librarian Ariana: The Books of the Seven Heroes | NS, PS4, PS5 | | | HYDE | Compile Heart | | |
| 2025 | Mandragora: Whispers of the Witch Tree | WIN, NS, PS5, XBX/S | | | Primal Game Studio | Knights Peak | | |
| 2025 (WW) | Monster Hunter Wilds | WIN, PS5, XBX/S | Original | | Capcom | | JP | |
| 2025 | Neptunia Game Maker R:Evolution | WIN | | | Compile Heart | Idea Factory International | | |
| 2025 | Nicktoons & The Dice of Destiny | WIN, NS, PS5, XBX/S, NS2 | | | Fair Play Labs, Petit Fabrik | GameMill Entertainment | | |
| 2025 | Of Ash and Steel | WIN | | | Fire & Frost | tinyBuild | | |
| 2025 | The Outer Worlds 2 | WIN, PS5, XBX/S | Original | | Obsidian Entertainment | Xbox Game Studios | | |
| 2025 | Pokémon Legends: Z-A | NS, NS2 | Original | | Game Freak | JP: The Pokémon Company; WW: Nintendo | | |
| 2025 | Raidou Remastered: The Mystery of the Soulless Army | WIN, NS, NS2, PS4, PS5, XBO, XBX/S | Remaster | | Atlus | | | |
| 2025 | Rise of the Rōnin | WIN | Port | | Team Ninja | Koei Tecmo | | |
| 2025 | Robots at Midnight | WIN, XBX/S, PS5 | | | Finish Line Games | Snail | | |
| 2025 | Rune Factory: Guardians of Azuma | WIN, NS, NS2 | Original | | Marvelous | | | |
| 2025 | Sacred 2: Fallen Angel Remaster | WIN, PS5, XBX/S | Remaster | | SparklingBit | THQ Nordic | | |
| 2025 | Sea Fantasy | WIN, NS | Original | | METASLA | | | |
| 2025 | Solo Leveling: Arise Overdrive | WIN | | | Netmarble Neo | Netmarble | | |
| 2025 | Stella Sora | WIN, DROID, iOS | | | Yostar | | | |
| 2025 | Sword of the Necromancer: Resurrection | WIN, NS, PS4, PS5, XBO, XBX/S | Remake | | Grimorio of Games | | | |
| 2025 | System Shock 2: 25th Anniversary Remaster | WIN, NS, PS4, PS5, XBO, XBX/S | Remaster | | Nightdive Studios | | | |
| 2025 | Tails of Iron II: Whiskers of Winter | WIN, OSX, LIN, NS, PS4, PS5, XBO, XBX/S | | | Odd Bug Studio | United Label | | |
| 2025 | Tainted Grail: The Fall of Avalon | WIN, PS5, XBX/S | Full release | | Questline | Awaken Realms | | |
| 2025 | Tales of Graces f Remastered | WIN, NS, PS4, PS5, XBO, XBX/S | Remaster | | Tose | Bandai Namco Entertainment | | |
| 2025 | Tales of Xillia Remastered | WIN, NS, PS5, XBX/S | Remaster | | Dokidoki Grooveworks | Bandai Namco Entertainment | | |
| 2025 | Touhou: Scarlet Curiosity | NS | | | Ankake Spa | Phoenixx | | |
| 2025 | Tribe Nine | WIN, OSX, iOS, DROID | | | Too Kyo Games | Akatsuki Games | | |
| 2025 | Trinity Trigger | iOS, DROID | | | Three Rings | FuRyu | | |
| 2025 | Utawarerumono: Zan | WIN | | | Aquaplus | Shiravune, DMM Games | | |
| 2025 | Vampire: The Masquerade – Bloodlines 2 | WIN, PS5, XBX/S | Original | | The Chinese Room | Paradox Interactive | | |
| 2025 | Wild Hearts S | NS2 | Port | | Omega Force | Koei Tecmo | | |
| 2025 (JP) | Wind Breaker: Rebel Heroes | WIN, iOS, DROID | | | Team Caravan | Kodansha | | |
| 2025 | Wuthering Waves | PS5 | Port | | Kuro Games | | | |
| 2025 | Xenoblade Chronicles X: Definitive Edition | NS | Remaster | | Monolith Soft | Nintendo | | |
| 2025 | Yasha: Legends of the Demon Blade | WIN, NS, PS4, PS5, XBX/S | | | 7Quark | Game Source Entertainment | | |
| 2025 (JP) | Yobarai Detective: Miasma Breaker | NS | Original | | Mebius | | | |
| 2025 (JP) | Ys IX: Monstrum Nox | PS5 | | | Nihon Falcom | | | |
| 2025 (JP) | Ys Memoire: Memories of Celceta | NS | Port | | Nihon Falcom | | | |
| 2025 (WW) | Ys Memoire: The Oath in Felghana | NS, PS4, PS5 | Remaster | | Nihon Falcom | NA: Xseed Games; EU: Marvelous Europe | | |
| 2025 (JP) | Ys VIII: Lacrimosa of Dana | PS5 | | | Nihon Falcom | | | |
| 2025 (JP) | Ys X: Proud Nordics | NS2 | | | Nihon Falcom | | | |
| 2025 | Zenless Zone Zero | XBX/S | Port | | miHoYo | CN: miHoYo; WW: Cognosphere | | |

== Soulslike ==
| Year | Title | Platform | Type | Setting | Developer | Publisher | COO | Ref. |
|---|---|---|---|---|---|---|---|---|
| 2020 | Pascal's Wager | DROID, iOS | | | TipsWorks | Giant Network | | |
| 2021 | Eldest Souls | WIN, NS, PS4, PS5, XBO, XBX/S | | | Fallen Flag Studio | United Label | | |
| 2022 | Little Witch Nobeta | WIN, NS, PS4 | | | Pupuya Games, SimonCreative | Justdan International | | |
| 2022 | Steelrising | WIN, PS5, XBX/S | | | Spiders | Nacon | | |
| 2023 (WW) | Lies of P | WIN, PS4, PS5, XBO, XBX/S | Original | Modern | Round8 Studio | Neowiz | KR | |
| 2024 | Deathbound | WIN, PS5, XBX/S | | | Trialforge Studio | Tate Multimedia | | |
| 2024 | Dragon Quest Builders | WIN | | | Square Enix | | | |
| 2024 | Enotria: The Last Song | WIN, PS5, XBX/S | | | Jyamma Games | | | |
| 2025 | Biomorph | XBX/S | Port | | Lucid Dreams Studio | | | |
| 2025 | Death Howl | WIN | | | The Outer Zone | 11 Bit Studios | | |
| 2025 | Redemption of Liuyin | WIN, PS5, XBX/S | | | KingnaGame | | | |
| 2025 | Wuchang: Fallen Feathers | WIN, PS5, XBX/S | | | Leenzee Games | 505 Games | | |
