= List of role-playing video games: 2020 to 2021 =

This is a comprehensive index of commercial role-playing video games (RPGs), sorted chronologically by year. Information regarding release platform, release type, RPG subgenre, game setting, developers, publishers, and country of origin is provided where available. The table can be sorted by clicking on the small boxes next to the column headings.

This list includes all RPG subgenres, including MMORPGs, Action RPGs and Tactical RPGs. This list does not include MUDs and Roguelikes by default, unless they have an additional RPG subgenre. For standalone lists on these subgenres, see List of MUDs and List of roguelikes

== Legend ==
Video game platforms
DROID	Android	iOS	iOS, iPhone, iPod, iPadOS, iPad, visionOS, Apple Vision Pro	LIN	Linux, SteamOS
Luna	Amazon Luna	OSX	macOS	NS	Nintendo Switch
PS4	PlayStation 4	Stadia	Google Stadia	WIN	Windows, all versions Windows 95 and up
XBO	Xbox One	XBX/S	Xbox Series X/S		

Types of releases
Compilation	A compilation, anthology or collection of several titles, usually (but not always) belonging to the same series
Early access	A game launched in early access is unfinished and thus might contain bugs and glitches or have some of the content missing
Episodic	An episodic video game that is released in batches over a period of time
Expansion	A large-scale DLC to an already existing game that adds new story, areas and additions and/or changes to the game's mechanics
Full release	A full release of a game that launched in early access first
Limited	A special release (often called "Limited" or "Collector's Edition") with bonus collector's material. Often provided to people who pre-order a game
Port	The game first appeared on a different platform and a port was made. The game is like the original, with few or no differences
Remake	The game is an enhanced remake of an original, made using a new engine and/or assets and thus containing completely new sound, graphics and possibly changes to the story and/or gameplay
Remaster	The game is a remaster of an original, released on the same or different platform, with (usually minor) changes to graphics, sound and/or gameplay
Rerelease	The game was re-released on the same platform with no or only minor changes

Video game genres
Action RPG	Action role-playing game	Dungeon crawl	Dungeon crawl	JRPG	Japanese-style role-playing game
MMORPG	Massively multiplayer online RPG	Monster tamer	Monster-taming game	MUD	Multi-user dungeon
Real-time	Real-time game	Roguelike	Roguelike, Roguelite	Sandbox	Sandbox game
Soulslike	Soulslike	Tactical RPG	Tactical role-playing game	Turn-based	Turn-based game

== List ==
Year	Title	Platform	Type	RPG Subgenre	Setting	Developer	Publisher	COO	Ref.
2020 (WW)	Action Taimanin	WIN, DROID, IOS	Original	Action RPG	Fantasy	Gremory Games, Lilith	Gremory Games, Infini-Brain inc.	JP	
2020 (NA,EU)	Arc of Alchemist	PS4, NS	Original	Action RPG	Fantasy	Compile Heart	Idea Factory	JP	
2020	Arknights	iOS, DROID		Action RPG, Tactical RPG		Hypergryph, Studio Montagne	Hypergryph, Yostar		
2020 (WW)	Assassin's Creed Valhalla	WIN, PS4, PS5, XBO, XBX/S, Stadia	Original	Action RPG	Historical, Sci-fi	Ubisoft Montreal	Ubisoft	CA	
2020	Atelier Dusk Trilogy Deluxe Pack	WIN, NS, PS4					Koei Tecmo		
2020 (JP)	Atelier Ryza 2: Lost Legends & the Secret Fairy	NS, PS4, PS5					Koei Tecmo		
2020	Bakugan: Champions of Vestroia	NS		Action RPG			Warner Bros. Interactive Entertainment		
2020	Big Brother: The Game	iOS, DROID					9th Impact		
2020	Bless Unleashed	PS4, XBO		MMORPG			Bandai Namco Entertainment, Neowiz		
2020	Borderlands 3	PS5, XBX/S		Action RPG			2K Games		
2020	Borderlands Legendary Collection	NS		Action RPG			2K Games		
2020	Boris and the Dark Survival	WIN, DROID		Dungeon crawl			Joey Drew Studios		
2020	Brigandine: The Legend of Runersia	PS4, NS		Tactical RPG			Happinet		
2020	Cat Quest + Cat Quest II Pawsome Pack	NS, PS4		Action RPG			PQube		
2020	Chronos: Before the Ashes	WIN, NS, PS4, XBO, Stadia		Action RPG			THQ Nordic		
2020	Collection of SaGa: Final Fantasy Legend	NS					Square Enix		
2020	CrossCode	NS, PS4, XBO		Action RPG			Deck13		
2020	Crown Trick	WIN, NS		Roguelike			Team17		
2020 (WW)	Cyberpunk 2077	WIN, PS4, XBO, Stadia	Original	Action RPG	Cyberpunk, Sci-fi	CD Projekt Red	CD Projekt	PL	
2020	Darksiders Genesis	NS, PS4, XBO				Airship Syndicate	THQ Nordic		
2020 (JP)	Death end re;Quest 2	PS4				Compile Heart			
2020 (WW)	Demon's Souls	PS5	Remake	Action RPG	Fantasy	Bluepoint Games	Sony Interactive Entertainment	US	
2020 (WW)	Doraemon Story of Seasons	PS4					Bandai Namco Entertainment		
2020 (WW)	Dragon Ball Z: Kakarot	WIN, PS4, XBO	Original	Action RPG	Fantasy	CyberConnect2	Bandai Namco Entertainment	JP	
2020	Dragon Quest of the Stars	iOS, DROID					Square Enix		
2020	Dragon Quest Tact	iOS, DROID					Square Enix		
2020	Dragon Quest XI S: Definitive Edition	WIN, PS4, XBO					Square Enix		
2020	Dweller's Empty Path	WIN, OSX					Temmie Chang		
2020 (WW)	The Elder Scrolls: Blades	NS	Original	Action RPG	Fantasy	Bethesda Game Studios	Bethesda Softworks	US	
2020	Exit the Gungeon	WIN, NS		Dungeon crawl			Devolver Digital		
2020	Fairy Tail	WIN, NS, PS4					Koei Tecmo		
2020	Fast & Furious Crossroads	WIN, PS4, XBO		Action RPG			Bandai Namco Entertainment		
2020	Final Fantasy Crystal Chronicles: Remastered Edition	NS, PS4, iOS, DROID		Action RPG			Square Enix		
2020 (WW)	Final Fantasy VII Remake	PS4	Remake	Action RPG	Fantasy	Square Enix Business Division 1	Square Enix	JP	
2020	Fire Emblem: Mystery of the Emblem	NS		Tactical RPG					
2020	Fire Emblem: Shadow Dragon and the Blade of Light	NS		Tactical RPG			Nintendo		
2020 (WW)	Gamedec	OSX, NS, PS4, WIN, XBO	Original	Non combat	Cyberpunk, Sci-fi	Anshar Studios	Anshar Publishing	PL	
2020 (WW)	Genshin Impact	WIN, PS4, iOS, DROID	Original	Action RPG	Fantasy	miHoYo		CN	
2020 (WW)	Godfall	WIN, PS5	Original	Action RPG	Fantasy	Counterplay Games	Gearbox Publishing	US	
2020 (JP/NA)	Granblue Fantasy Versus	PS4, WIN				Arc System Works	JP: Cygames; WW: Xseed Games		
2020 (WW)	Guardian Tales	NS, IOS, DROID	Original	Action RPG	Fantasy	Kong Studios	Kakao Games, Kong Studios	KR	
2020	Haven	WIN, PS5, XBO, XBX/S					The Game Bakers		
2020	Hellpoint	WIN, PS4, XBO		Action RPG			tinyBuild		
2020	Hero Must Die. Again	NS, WIN, PS4					Degica Games		
2020	Horizon Zero Dawn	WIN		Action RPG			Sony Interactive Entertainment		
2020 (WW)	Hylics 2	WIN	Original	Action RPG	Surrealist fantasy	Mason Lindroth		US	
2020	Ikenfell	WIN, NS, PS4, XBO		Tactical RPG			Humble Bundle		
2020 (WW)	Iron Danger	WIN	Original	Action RPG	Steampunk	Action Squad Studios	Daedalic Entertainment	FI	
2020	Katana Kami: A Way of the Samurai Story	WIN, NS, PS4		Action RPG			Spike Chunsoft		
2020	Kingdom Hearts Dark Road	iOS, DROID		Action RPG			Square Enix		
2020	Kingdom Hearts HD 1.5 + 2.5 Remix	XBO		Action RPG			Square Enix		
2020	Kingdom Hearts HD 2.8 Final Chapter Prologue	XBO		Action RPG			Square Enix		
2020	Kingdoms of Amalur: Re-Reckoning	WIN, PS4, XBO		Action RPG			THQ Nordic		
2020	Langrisser I & II	WIN, NS, PS4		Tactical RPG			NIS America		
2020 (JP)	The Legend of Heroes: Trails into Reverie	PS4					Nihon Falcom		
2020	The Legend of Heroes: Trails of Cold Steel III	WIN, NS					NIS America		
2020	The Legend of Heroes: Trails of Cold Steel IV	PS4					NIS America		
2020 (WW)	Little Town Hero	WIN, PS4, XBO	Port			Game Freak	Game Freak, NIS America, Rainy Frog		
2020	Maneater	PS4, PS5, XBO, XBX/S, WIN		Action RPG			Deep Silver		
2020 (JP)	Metal Max Xeno: Reborn	PS4					Kadokawa Games		
2020	Minecraft Dungeons	WIN, NS, PS4, XBO		Dungeon crawl			Xbox Game Studios		
2020	Monster Crown	WIN					Soedesco		
2020	Monster Hunter World: Iceborne	WIN		Action RPG		Capcom			
2020	Moon: Remix RPG Adventure	NS					Onion Games		
2020	Mortal Shell	WIN, PS4, XBO		Action RPG			Playstack		
2020 (JP)	Neptunia ReVerse	PS5					Compile Heart		
2020	Nioh 2	PS4		Action RPG			Koei Tecmo		
2020	Octopath Traveler	Stadia					Square Enix		
2020 (WW)	Omori	WIN, OSX	Original	Open world RPG, Turn-based, JRPG	Psychological horror	OMOCAT	OMOCAT, PLAYISM	US	
2020	The Outer Worlds	NS		Action RPG			Private Division		
2020	Paper Mario: The Origami King	NS					Nintendo		
2020	Pascal's Wager	DROID, iOS		Soulslike		TipsWorks	Giant Network		
2020	Persona 4 Golden	WIN					Atlus		
2020	Persona 5 Royal	PS4					Atlus		
2020 (JP)	Persona 5 Strikers	NS, PS4					Atlus		
2020 (NA)	Phantasy Star Online 2	WIN, XBO		MMORPG			Sega		
2020	Pillars of Eternity II: Deadfire	PS4, XBO				Obsidian Entertainment	Versus Evil		
2020 (JP)	Punishing: Gray Raven	iOS, DROID		Action RPG			Kuro Games		
2020	Rune Factory 4 Special	NS					Xseed Games		
2020	Sakura Wars	PS4		Action RPG			Sega		
2020 (JP)	Shadowverse: Champion's Battle	NS					Cygames		
2020 (JP)	Shin Megami Tensei	NS							
2020 (JP)	Shin Megami Tensei III: Nocturne HD Remaster	NS, PS4					Atlus		
2020	Shiren the Wanderer: The Tower of Fortune and the Dice of Fate	WIN, NS		Roguelike			Spike Chunsoft		
2020	Snack World: The Dungeon Crawl - Gold	NS				Level-5, h.a.n.d.	Level-5		
2020	Star Renegades	PS4, NS, XBO, WIN					Raw Fury		
2020	Sword Art Online: Alicization Lycoris	WIN, PS4, XBO		Action RPG			Bandai Namco Entertainment		
2020	Tenderfoot Tactics	WIN, OSX, LIN		Tactical RPG			Ice Water Games		
2020	Tokyo Mirage Sessions ♯FE Encore	NS				Atlus	Nintendo		
2020	Torchlight III	NS, WIN, PS4, XBO		Action RPG			Perfect World Entertainment		
2020 (JP)	Touhou LostWord	iOS, DROID		Action RPG					
2020	Transformers: Battlegrounds	WIN, NS, PS4, XBO		Tactical RPG			Outright Games		
2020	Trials of Mana	WIN, NS, PS4		Action RPG			Square Enix		
2020	Utawarerumono: Prelude to the Fallen	PS4, PSV					NIS America		
2020	Warframe	PS5		Action RPG			Digital Extremes		
2020	Warhammer: Chaosbane	PS5, XBX/S		Action RPG			Nacon		
2020 (WW)	Wasteland 3	WIN, PS4, XBO	Original	Turn-based	Sci-fi, Post-apocalyptic	inXile Entertainment	inXile Entertainment, Deep Silver	US	
2020 (WW)	The Waylanders	WIN	Original	Real-time with pause	Celtic, Fantasy	Gato Studio		ES	
2020	Werewolf: The Apocalypse – Heart of the Forest	WIN, OSX, LIN					Walkabout Games		
2020	William's Love Prelude	WIN					Pika's Game		
2020	World of Warcraft: Shadowlands	WIN, OSX		MMORPG			Blizzard Entertainment		
2020	XCOM 2 Collection	NS		Tactical RPG			2K Games		
2020	Xenoblade Chronicles: Definitive Edition	NS		Action RPG			Nintendo		
2020 (WW)	Xuan-Yuan Sword VII	WW: WIN; AS: PS4		Action RPG			Softstar, Justdan International		
2020 (WW)	Yakuza: Like a Dragon	WIN, PS4, XBO, XBX/S				Ryu Ga Gotoku Studio	Sega		
2020	Ys: Memories of Celceta	PS4		Action RPG			Xseed Games		
2021	Abomi Nation	WIN		Monster tamer		Orange Pylon Games	DANGEN Entertainment		
2021 (WW)	Akiba's Trip: Hellbound & Debriefed	WIN, NS, PS4		Action RPG		Acquire	JP: Acquire; WW: Xseed Games		
2021 (JP)	Ar Nosurge DX	WIN, NS, PS4				Gust	Koei Tecmo		
2021 (WW)	Arboria	WIN	Original	Action RPG	Dark fantasy	Dreamplant	All in! Games SA	PL	
2021	Arkham Horror: Mother's Embrace	WIN, NS, PS4, XBO		Tactical RPG		Artefacts Studio	Asmodee Digital		
2021 (WW)	The Ascent	WIN, XBO, XBX/S	Original	Action RPG	Cyberpunk	Neon Giant	Curve Digital	SE	
2021	Astria Ascending	WIN, NS, PS4, PS5, XBO, XBX/S				Artisan Studios	Dear Villagers		
2021	Atelier Mysterious Trilogy Deluxe Pack	WIN, NS, PS4				Gust	Koei Tecmo		
2021	Atelier Ryza 2: Lost Legends & the Secret Fairy	WIN, NS, PS4, PS5				Gust Co. Ltd.	Koei Tecmo		
2021 (WW)	ATOM RPG Trudograd	LIN, OSX, NS, PS4, WIN, XBO	Original	Turn-based	Sci-fi, Post-apocalyptic	AtomTeam		CY	
2021	Baldo	WIN, NS, PS4, XBO				NAPS team			
2021	Baldur's Gate: Dark Alliance	WIN, OSX, LIN, PS4, XBO, NS		Action RPG		Black Isle Studios	Interplay Entertainment		
2021	Beast Breaker	WIN, NS				Vodeo Games			
2021 (WW)	Biomutant	WIN, PS4, XBO	Original	Action RPG	Fantasy	Experiments 101	THQ Nordic	SE	
2021	Black Book	WIN, NS, PS4, XBO				Morteshka	HypeTrain Digital		
2021 (WW)	Blue Archive	iOS, DROID		Action RPG, Tactical RPG		Nexon Games	JP: Yostar; WW: Nexon Games		
2021	Blue Reflection: Second Light	WIN, NS, PS4				Gust	Koei Tecmo		
2021	Boyfriend Dungeon	WIN, NS, XBO		Dungeon crawl		Kitfox Games			
2021	Bravely Default 2	NS, WIN				Claytechworks	Nintendo, Square Enix		
2021 (WW)	The Caligula Effect 2	NS, PS4				Historia	JP: FuRyu; WW: NIS America		
2021 (JP)	Caravan Stories	NS		MMORPG		Aiming Inc.			
2021	Cookie Run: Kingdom	iOS, DROID, WIN		Action RPG		Devsisters			
2021	Cris Tales	WIN, NS, PS4, PS5, XBO, XBX/S, Stadia				Dreams Uncorporated, Syck	Modus Games		
2021 (JP)	The Cruel King and the Great Hero	NS, PS4				Nippon Ichi Software			
2021	Curse of the Dead Gods	WIN, NS, PS4, XBO		Action RPG, Roguelike		Passtech Games	Focus Home Interactive		
2021	Dandy Ace	NS, XBO, WIN		Action RPG		Mad Mimic	Neowiz		
2021	Dark Deity	WIN		Tactical RPG		Sword & Axe LLC	Freedom Games		
2021	Darksiders III	NS		Action RPG		Gunfire Games	THQ Nordic		
2021	Death end re;Quest	NS				Compile Heart	Idea Factory International		
2021	Deltarune: Chapter 2	WIN, OSX, NS, PS4				Toby Fox	Toby Fox, 8-4 (console)		
2021 (JP)	Demon Gaze Extra	NS, PS4				Cattle Call	Kadokawa Games		
2021	Diablo II: Resurrected	WIN, NS, PS4, PS5, XBO, XBX/S		Action RPG		Blizzard Entertainment, Vicarious Visions	Blizzard Entertainment		
2021	Disco Elysium: The Final Cut	WIN, OSX, PS4, PS5, Stadia, NS, XBO, XBX/S				ZA/UM			
2021 (WW)	Disgaea 6: Defiance of Destiny	NS, PS4		Tactical RPG		Nippon Ichi Software			
2021	Dragon Ball Z: Kakarot	NS		Action RPG		CyberConnect2	Bandai Namco Entertainment		
2021	Dragon Quest Builders 2	XBO		Action RPG		Square Enix			
2021	Dungeon Encounters	WIN, NS, PS4				Cattle Call	Square Enix		
2021 (WW)	Dungeons & Dragons: Dark Alliance	WIN, PS4, PS5, XBO, XBX/S	Original	Action RPG	Fantasy	Tuque Games	Wizards of the Coast	CA	
2021 (WW)	Eastward	WIN, OSX, NS	Original	Action RPG	Sci-fi, Post-apocalyptic	Pixpil	Chucklefish	CN	
2021	Echo Generation	XBO, XBX/S		Action RPG		Cococucumber			
2021	Edge of Eternity	WIN				Midgard Studio	Dear Villagers		
2021	The Elder Scrolls Online	PS5, XBX/S		MMORPG		ZeniMax Online Studios	Bethesda Softworks		
2021	The Elder Scrolls V: Skyrim Anniversary Edition	WIN, PS4, PS5, XBO, XBX/S				Bethesda Game Studios	Bethesda Softworks		
2021	Eldest Souls	WIN, NS, PS4, PS5, XBO, XBX/S		Soulslike, Action RPG		Fallen Flag Studio	United Label		
2021 (WW)	Encased: A Sci-Fi Post-Apocalyptic RPG	WIN	Original	Turn-based	Sci-fi, Post-apocalyptic	Dark Crystal Games	Prime Matter	RU	
2021	Everhood	WIN, NS				Chris Nordgren, Jordi Roca	Foreign Gnomes, Surefire		
2021	Fallen Legion: Revenants	NS, PS4		Action RPG		YummyYummyTummy	NIS America		
2021	Final Fantasy VII Remake Intergrade	WIN, PS5		Action RPG		Square Enix			
2021	Final Fantasy XIV	PS5		MMORPG		Square Enix			
2021	Final Fantasy XIV: Endwalker	WIN, OSX, PS4, PS5		MMORPG		Square Enix			
2021 (JP)	Fire Emblem: Genealogy of the Holy War	NS		Tactical RPG					
2021	Fuga: Melodies of Steel	WIN, NS, PS4, PS5, XBO, XBX/S		Tactical RPG		CyberConnect2			
2021	Garden Story	WIN, OSX, NS		Action RPG		Picogram	Rose City Games		
2021	Genshin Impact	PS5		Action RPG		MiHoYo			
2021 (JP)	Gloria Union: Twin Fates in Blue Ocean FHD Edition	NS, iOS, DROID		Tactical RPG		Sting Entertainment	Atlus		
2021	Gnosia	NS				Petit Depotto	Playism		
2021	Godfall	PS4		Action RPG		Counterplay Games	Gearbox Publishing		
2021	The Good Life	WIN, NS, PS4, XBO				White Owls Inc.	Playism		
2021 (JP,CN)	Guardian Tales	NS, IOS, DROID	Original	Action RPG	Fantasy	Kong Studios	CN: Bilibili; JP: Kong Studios, Yostar	KR	
2021	Haven	NS, PS4				The Game Bakers			
2021	Hellpoint	NS		Action RPG		Cradle Games	tinyBuild		
2021	King of Seas	WIN, NS, PS4, XBO		Action RPG		3DClouds	Team17		
2021	King's Bounty II	WIN, NS, PS4, XBO		Tactical RPG		1C Company	Deep Silver		
2021	Kingdom Hearts HD 1.5 Remix	WIN		Action RPG		Square Enix			
2021	Kingdom Hearts HD 2.5 Remix	WIN		Action RPG		Square Enix			
2021	Kingdom Hearts HD 2.8 Final Chapter Prologue	WIN		Action RPG		Square Enix			
2021	Kingdom Hearts III + Re Mind	WIN		Action RPG		Square Enix			
2021	Kingdoms of Amalur: Re-Reckoning	NS		Action RPG		Kaiko	THQ Nordic		
2021	Kitaria Fables	WIN, NS, PS4, PS5, XBO, XBX/S				Twin Hearts	PQube		
2021 (JP)	The Legend of Heroes: Trails into Reverie	WIN, NS				Nihon Falcom	Clouded Leopard Entertainment		
2021 (WW)	The Legend of Heroes: Trails of Cold Steel IV	WIN, NS				Nihon Falcom	JP: Nippon Ichi Software; WW: Nihon Falcom		
2021 (JP)	The Legend of Heroes: Trails Through Daybreak	PS4				Nihon Falcom			
2021	Legend of Mana	WIN, NS, PS4		Action RPG		Square Enix			
2021	The Legend of Nayuta: Boundless Trails (Note: Available worldwide; no English audio/dub, only Japanese.)	WIN		Action RPG		Nihon Falcom, PH3 GmbH	NIS America		
2021	The Legend of Sword and Fairy 7	WIN		Action RPG		Softstar	CubeGame		
2021	The Life and Suffering of Sir Brante	WIN				Sever	101XP		
2021	Light Fairytale Episode II	PS4				neko works			
2021 (JP)	Maglam Lord	NS, PS4		Action RPG		Felistella	D3 Publisher		
2021	Maneater	NS		Action RPG		Tripwire Interactive	Tripwire Interactive, Deep Silver		
2021	Märchen Forest: Mylne and the Forest Gift	WIN, NS, PS4				PrimaryOrbit	Clouded Leopard Entertainment		
2021	Mary Skelter Finale	NS, PS4		Action RPG, Roguelike		Compile Heart	Idea Factory International		
2021	Mass Effect Legendary Edition	WIN, PS4, XBO		Action RPG		BioWare	Electronic Arts		
2021 (WW)	Mechajammer	OSX, WIN	Original	Open world RPG	Cyberpunk, Horror, Sci-fi	Whalenought Studios	Modern Wolf	US	
2021	Miitopia	NS				Grezzo	Nintendo		
2021 (JP)	Monark	NS, PS4, PS5				Lancarse	FuRyu		
2021	Monster Crown	NS				Aurum	Soedesco		
2021 (WW)	Monster Hunter Rise	NS	Original	Action RPG		Capcom		JP	
2021 (WW)	Monster Hunter Stories 2: Wings of Ruin	WIN, NS	Original	Turn-based, Monster tamer		Capcom, Marvelous	Capcom	JP	
2021	Monster Rancher 1 & 2 DX	WIN, NS, iOS				Koei Tecmo			
2021	Mortal Shell: Enhanced Edition	PS5, XBX/S		Action RPG		Cold Symmetry	Playstack		
2021 (JP)	Nayuta no Kiseki Kai	PS4		Action RPG		Nihon Falcom			
2021	Neo: The World Ends with You	NS, PS4, WIN		Action RPG		Square Enix, h.a.n.d.	Square Enix		
2021	Neptunia ReVerse	PS5				Compile Heart	Idea Factory International		
2021	New Pokémon Snap	NS		Dungeon crawl		Bandai Namco Studios	The Pokémon Company / Nintendo		
2021	New World	WIN		MMORPG		Amazon Games Orange County	Amazon Games		
2021	Ni no Kuni II: Revenant Kingdom – Prince's Edition	NS				Level-5	Bandai Namco Entertainment		
2021	Nier Replicant ver.1.22474487139...	WIN, PS4, XBO		Action RPG		Toylogic	Square Enix		
2021	Nioh 2 - The Complete Edition	WIN, PS4		Action RPG		Team Ninja	Sony Interactive Entertainment / Koei Tecmo		
2021	Nioh 2 Remastered - The Complete Edition	PS5		Action RPG		Team Ninja	Sony Interactive Entertainment / Koei Tecmo		
2021	Nioh Remastered - The Complete Edition	PS5		Action RPG		Team Ninja	Sony Interactive Entertainment / Koei Tecmo		
2021	Outriders	WIN, PS4, PS5, XBO, XBX/S, Stadia				People Can Fly	Square Enix		
2021	Paper Mario	NS							
2021 (WW)	Pathfinder: Wrath of the Righteous	OSX, PS4, WIN, XBO	Original	Turn-based	Fantasy	Owlcat Games	META Publishing, Owlcat Games	CY	
2021	Persona 5 Strikers	WIN, NS, PS4				Omega Force, P-Studio	Atlus		
2021	Phantasy Star IV	NS							
2021	Phantasy Star Online 2: New Genesis	NA: WIN, XBO, XBX/S; JP: WIN, NS, PS4		Action RPG		Sega Online R&D	Sega		
2021	Poison Control	NS, PS4		Action RPG		Nippon Ichi Software			
2021	Pokémon Brilliant Diamond and Shining Pearl	NS		Monster tamer		ILCA	The Pokémon Company / Nintendo		
2021	Punishing: Gray Raven	iOS, DROID		Action RPG		Kuro Games			
2021	Re:Legend	WIN, PS4, NS, XBO				Magnus Games Studio	505 Games		
2021	Re:Zero − Starting Life in Another World: The Prophecy of the Throne	WIN, NS, PS4		Tactical RPG		Chime	Spike Chunsoft		
2021	Rogue Heroes: Ruins of Tasos	WIN, NS		Action RPG, Roguelike		Heliocentric Studios	Team17		
2021	Ruined King: A League of Legends Story	WIN, NS, PS4, PS5, XBO, XBX/S		Tactical RPG		Airship Syndicate	Riot Forge		
2021	Rune Factory 4 Special	WIN, PS4, XBO				Hakama	Xseed Games		
2021 (JP)	Rune Factory 5	NS				Marvelous			
2021	SaGa Frontier Remastered	WIN, NS, PS4, iOS, DROID				Square Enix			
2021 (WW)	Sands of Salzaar	WIN	Original	Action RPG, Open world	Fantasy	Han-Squirrel Studio	XD	CN	
2021	Save Me Mr Tako: Definitive Edition	WIN, NS		Action RPG		Deneos Games	Deneos Games, Limited Run Games		
2021	Saviors of Sapphire Wings & Stranger of Sword City Revisited	WIN, NS		Dungeon crawl		Experience	NIS America		
2021	Scarlet Nexus	WIN, PS4, PS5, XBO, XBX/S		Action RPG		Bandai Namco Studios	Bandai Namco Entertainment		
2021	Shadowverse: Champion's Battle	NS				Cygames	Xseed Games		
2021 (JP)	Shin Megami Tensei If…	NS							
2021 (JP)	Shin Megami Tensei II	NS							
2021	Shin Megami Tensei III: Nocturne HD Remaster	WIN, NS, PS4				Atlus			
2021	Shin Megami Tensei V	NS				Atlus			
2021	Shining Force	NS		Tactical RPG					
2021	Skyforge	NS		MMORPG		Allods Team / Obsidian Entertainment	My.com		
2021 (WW)	Solasta: Crown of the Magister	OSX, WIN	Original	Turn-based	Fantasy	Tactical Adventures		FR	
2021	SpellForce 3 Reforced	WIN				Grimlore Games	THQ Nordic		
2021	Star Wars: Knights of the Old Republic	NS				Aspyr	Lucasfilm Games		
2021	Staxel	NS				Plukit			
2021	Story of Seasons: Pioneers of Olive Town	NS				Marvelous	Xseed Games		
2021	Sword of the Necromancer	WIN, NS, PS4, XBO		Roguelike		Grimorio of Games	Grimorio of Games, JanduSoft		
2021	Sword of Vermilion	NS		Action RPG					
2021	Tails Noir	PS4, PS5, XBO, XBX/S, WIN				EggNut	Raw Fury		
2021	Tails of Iron	WIN, NS, PS4, PS5, XBO, XBX/S		Action RPG		Odd Bug Studio	United Label		
2021	Tales of Arise	WIN, PS4, PS5, XBO, XBX/S		Action RPG		Bandai Namco Studios	Bandai Namco Entertainment		
2021	Tales of Luminaria	iOS, DROID		Action RPG		Bandai Namco Studios	Bandai Namco Entertainment		
2021	Tiny Tina's Assault on Dragon Keep: A Wonderlands One-Shot Adventure	WIN, PS4, PS5, XBO, XBX/S		Action RPG		Gearbox Software, Stray Kite Studios	2K Games		
2021	Toem	WIN, NS, PS5		Dungeon crawl		Something We Made			
2021	Touhou LostWord	iOS, DROID		Action RPG					
2021	Trials of Mana	iOS, DROID				Square Enix			
2021	Umurangi Generation	NS		Dungeon crawl		Origame Digital	Playism		
2021	Undernauts: Labyrinth of Yomi	WIN, NS, PS4, XBO		Roguelike		Experience	Aksys Games		
2021	Undertale	XBO, XBX/S				Toby Fox			
2021	Vaporum: Lockdown	NS		Action RPG		Fatbot Games			
2021	Voice of Cards: The Isle Dragon Roars	WIN, NS, PS4				Alim	Square Enix		
2021 (WW)	Void Terrarium Plus	PS5		Roguelike		Nippon Ichi Software			
2021 (WW)	Wartales	WIN	Original	Open world RPG, Turn-based	Fantasy	Shiro Games	Shiro Unlimited	FR	
2021	The Waylanders	WIN				Gato Studio			
2021	Werewolf: The Apocalypse – Earthblood	WIN, PS4, PS5, XBO, XBX/S		Action RPG		Cyanide	Nacon		
2021	Werewolf: The Apocalypse – Heart of the Forest	NS				Different Tales	Walkabout Games		
2021	Wildermyth	WIN		Tactical RPG		Worldwalker Games			
2021	Winds of Change	NS				Klace	Crunching Koalas		
2021	Woodsalt	WIN				Team Woodsalt			
2021	Xuan-Yuan Sword VII	PS4, XBO		Action RPG		Softstar, DOMO Studio, Yooreka Studio	eastasiasoft		
2021 (JP)	Yakuza: Like a Dragon	WIN, XBO, XBX/S, PS5				Ryu Ga Gotoku Studio	Sega		
2021 (WW)	Ys IX: Monstrum Nox	WIN, NS, PS4		Action RPG		Nihon Falcom	NIS America		
2021	Zengeon	NS		Action RPG		IndieLeague Studio	PQube		
