= Quest 2 (disambiguation) =

The Meta Quest 2 is a virtual reality headset developed by Reality Labs.

Quest 2 or Quest II may refer to:

- Dragon Quest II, a 1987 role-playing video game
- Deltora Quest 2, a series of children's fantasy books
- King's Quest II, second installment in the King's Quest series of graphic adventure games
- Police Quest II: The Vengeance, a 1988 police procedural adventure video game
- Space Quest II, a 1987 graphic adventure game
- Costume Quest 2, a 2014 role-playing video game
- Cat Quest II, a 2019 action role-playing game
- Puzzle Quest 2, a 2010 video game
- EverQuest II, a 3D fantasy massively multiplayer online role-playing game
- Gargoyle's Quest II, a 1992 action-adventure game
