= Rogue Heroes =

Rogue Heroes can refer to:

- Rogue Heroes: Ruins of Tasos
- SAS: Rogue Heroes
