= Hylics =

2015 video game

- Developer: Mason Lindroth
- Publisher: Mason Lindroth
- Composer: Mason Lindroth
- Engine: RPG Maker VX Ace
- Platform: Windows
- Release: August 4, 2015
- Genre: Role-playing
- Mode: Single-player

Hylics is a 2015 role-playing video game developed and published by Mason Lindroth. It was released for Windows on August 4, 2015 through Itch.io and on October 2, 2015 through Steam. The game uses claymation graphics to depict a surreal world. A sequel, Hylics 2, was released in 2020. A third game is currently in development.

== Gameplay ==
Screenshot of a battle, showing the game's protagonist, Wayne, against three enemies, Spiral Polycerates.

Hylics plays like a traditional JRPG despite its surreal setting. Hit points are replaced with "flesh", while magic points are replaced with "will". Battles are shown from a first-person perspective, with the character's hands being shown performing attacks. Wayne loses all his flesh when defeated, but does not die, rather warping to an "afterlife" from which he and his party members can travel back to a previous area. Battle items are also unusual, such as being able to attack with a frozen burrito. Special attacks, referred to as Gestures, can be learned from TVs found throughout the game.

== Plot ==
Hylics takes place on an archipelago in a world implied to be posthuman and is divided into 3 acts, each one beginning with a prelude roughly describing the current plot events using partially randomly generated sentences. The primary goal of the game is to defeat Gibby, King of the Moon. Many of the game's NPCs speak using random text generation, with the player's goals primarily represented through environmental design. It is implied that Gibby is responsible for the incoherent dialogue found throughout the game.

Act I begins in the house of the player character, Wayne. Nearby Wayne's house is a town and a facility for warping to another dimension. Exploring the town and its adjacent mountain reaches an area filled with ruins populated by Cone Cultists, who forbid anything from leaving the mountain to "promote a reverse-erosion". Wayne finds an archaeologist named Dedusmuln who is searching for a paper cup to be used with a water cooler. In Dedusmuln's tent is a device next to a bed that can be activated to reveal the cup's location in a dream. Also within the dream is a room containing a Sage, an ancient ruler before Gibby. Upon finding and giving the paper cup to Dedusmuln, they join Wayne's party. The warp facility contains a device allowing Wayne to travel to a blue colored dimension, where he must go to disable a gate preventing him from leaving the starting island in the main dimension. Another warp device in the blue dimension goes to an island where Somsnosa, a friend of Wayne, lives. Wayne assists Somsnosa with retrieving her gauntlets from her basement, being unable to do so herself due to an infestation of Ambulant Skulls, which kill Wayne on contact.

Within the blue dimension is a castle where the gate controls are. However, Wayne is stopped by a guard who manifests a "Horrid Projection", which must be defeated. After disabling the gate and returning to his home dimension, Act II begins. Wayne can travel to other islands via boat, one of which houses a cave where a knight named Pongorma lives. He reveals that he has been sealed within the cave for many years and asks Wayne to fight him. Upon his defeat, he joins Wayne's party. Another island holds a graveyard and subterranean tomb, which Wayne explores. Upon exiting the tomb after fully exploring the area, Act III begins and Wayne gains access to an airship, allowing him to reach every island in the archipelago.

The Sage's tokens are used to activate a TV on a newly accessible island that grants the Sage's gesture, "Legend of Melting", to all party members. To reach the Moon and fight Gibby, Wayne must purchase a spaceship key from a hot dog vendor. The key is prohibitively expensive, however another island houses a laboratory where devices that turn creatures into money can be accessed, granting enough to purchase the key. After launching the ship and landing on the Moon, Wayne fights through Gibby's palace, eventually reaching Gibby and battling him. Upon defeat, Gibby reveals he has rigged the Moon to explode upon his death, forcing Wayne and his crew to leave and ending the game.

== Development ==
The game was developed using the RPG Maker VX Ace engine and took a year to develop.

== Reception ==
Hylics has received positive reviews. Emily Gera of Rock Paper Shotgun described the game as "like a scene from Bosch by way of Videodrome". Alice O'Connor of the same site called it "silly and funny and occasionally gruesome". Chris Priestman of Kill Screen called the game's animation "wonderful" and stated that "to play a Mason Lindroth game is to delight in all that is possible within the material world and to learn how wonderful creation and destruction can be." Heather Alexandrea of Kotaku Australia felt the game was "about feeling lost in a strange world before finding familiarity and purpose". Jordan Devore of Destructoid said Hylics was "the trippiest RPG [he'd] ever seen", calling it "bonkers".

== Sequels ==
Hylics 2 was first announced in January 2018 and released on June 22, 2020. The game is made in Unity and features new gameplay, improved graphics and a significantly expanded story about Gibby's minions attempting to revive him and Wayne's quest to stop them.

Since early 2022, Lindroth has posted work in progress for a third Hylics game. As of 2024, the posts feature redesigned enemies from his earlier games, as well as enemies and NPCs from the Hylics universe.

== Absent Moon, a Hylics Song Cycle ==
Absent Moon, a Hylics Song Cycle is a rock opera and concept album composed and performed by Chuck Salamone, featuring Vinny from Vinesauce and Diane Aragona. The album was released on May 1, 2023.

Absent Moon, a Hylics Song Cycle track listing
No.	Title	Length
1.	"The Champion of Ennui / Into the Pastel Sky" (featuring Vinny Vinesauce and Diane Aragona)	5:20
2.	"The Promethean's Lament"	4:42
3.	"The Way Back Home" (featuring Diane Aragona)	4:55
4.	"Seasons"	4:19
5.	"Spell of Absurdity" (featuring Diane Aragona)	4:52
6.	"As the World Begins to Wane"	7:32
7.	"Awakening"	1:25
8.	"The Champion of Ennui / Into the Pastel Sky" (instrumental)	5:20
9.	"The Promethean's Lament" (instrumental)	4:42
10.	"The Way Back Home" (instrumental)	4:55
11.	"Seasons" (instrumental)	4:19
12.	"Spell of Absurdity" (instrumental)	4:52
13.	"As the World Begins to Wane" (instrumental)	7:32
Total length:		64:45
