= Backfirewall =

2023 video game

Backfirewall_
- Steam version digital art
- Developer: Naraven Games
- Publisher: All in! Games
- Director: Nicolas Oberson
- Producers: Michał Ostapowicz; Łukasz Stawarz
- Designers: Lucie Robert; Phoebe Shalloway
- Programmers: Adriana De Pesters; Phoebe Shalloway
- Artists: Taychin Dunnvatanachit; Ricardo Amaral Accioly
- Writer: Julia Jean
- Composers: Greg Terlikowski; Teho
- Platforms: Windows; PlayStation 4; PlayStation 5; Xbox One; Xbox Series
- Release: 30 January 2023
- Genres: Adventure, puzzle
- Mode: Single-player

Backfirewall (stylized as backfirewall_) is a 2023 video game developed by Swiss independent studio Naraven and published by All in! Games. Described as a "tragicomedy set inside your smartphone", the game is a puzzle adventure game in which players traverse levels to sabotage a smartphone to prevent its operating system from updating. Upon release, Backfirewall received positive reviews from critics, with praise directed to the game's narrative, puzzle design, and setting.

== Gameplay ==
Levels are based around the various components of a mobile phone.

Backfirewall is a puzzle game in which the player completes levels by completing a series of listed objectives, which will open a door to the next level. Objectives consist of manipulating the game's environment to contradict a list of conditions made about the state of the level and its objects, such as the number and location of certain objects, and the operation of certain machines. To do this, the player uses a series of "commands" that affect the game's environment, including the "delete" function, which allows players to eliminate objects in the level, and the "reverse" function, which reverses the effect of gravity on an object. Additionally, the player can change the color of objects using the "color code" function to enable them to behave in a different way, and can duplicate items using the "duplicate" function. Using these powers, the player interacts with objects in the level, including removing or activating boxes, levers, elevators, and gates. Hints and solutions can be accessed periodically in-game by consulting OS9 or a rubber duck, who will provide details on the objectives.

== Plot ==
Set inside the software for a mobile phone, the player takes the role of an update assistant preparing to update the operating system from OS9 to OS10. The player meets OS9, who is in denial about the poor performance of the mobile, and learns they will be destroyed as part of the update. The player works with OS9 to investigate the system and prevent the update from occurring. The player travels through the various components of the phone, including the RAM, GPU and battery, and meets the apps and software that work in those components along the way.

== Development and release ==
Backfirewall was the second game developed by Swiss independent developer Naraven Games, a female-led developed studio founded by Adriana de Pesters and Julia Jean, with Lucie Robert leading the design of the game. The developers stated that their motivation for the game was to create a narrative-driven adventure game about the "smartphones we use without thinking twice about the apps and software inside them", citing Pixar films as an influence for the personification of everyday items. Naraven Games released a trailer for the game at the PC Gaming Show in June 2022, and released a trailer at the Future Games Show in August.

== Reception ==
Reception

Aggregate score
Aggregator	Score
Metacritic	85%

Review scores
Publication	Score
The Games Machine (Italy)	8/10
Multiplayer.it	8.5/10
Screen Rant	4.5/5 stars
Softpedia	4/5 stars

Backfirewall received "generally favorable" reviews, according to review aggregator Metacritic. Critics described the puzzles and hints system as intuitive and varied. Softpedia commended the game's variety of "complex" puzzles, highlighting the game's challenge, gradual introduction of game mechanics, and inclusion of a hint system. Multiplayer.it found the game's mechanics to be "well-explained" and the puzzles "entertaining without ever being repetitive". Screen Rant described the game's puzzles as "short and simple" and the hints system as "well-designed", although noted the provision of solutions in the system may "defeat the point" of the puzzles.

The game's concept and writing received praise. Multiplayer.it described the game's writing as a "thoughtful" game that will "make you rethink the relationship you have with technology", characterizing the game's themes as a criticism of the technology sector's use of planned obsolescence, violations of user privacy and obstruction of rights to repair. The Games Machine similarly described the game as "well-written" and developed with "intelligence and taste". Screen Rant found the game to feature a "unique" story that was "emotionally intelligent and clever", highlighting the "sarcastic wit and sincerity" of the game's narrator. However, Softpedia remarked that the player's "mileage may vary" with the game's humor, finding it "can come across as trying much too hard".

Critics were mostly positive on the game's graphics and environmental design. The Games Machine found the game to be "imaginative" and an "inspired and colorful representation of the IT environment". Screen Rant described the game as "carefully-designed" and featuring a "surprisingly immersive world filled with life and detail". In contrast, Softpedia wrote that the game's visual presentation had "limited appeal" and the design of the game's environments did not "make much sense".
