= Astlibra Revision =

2022 video game

- Developer: KEIZO
- Publisher: WhisperGames
- Writer: Keizō
- Platforms: Nintendo Switch, Windows
- Release: 13 October 2022 (Windows); 16 November 2023 (Switch)
- Genre: Action RPG
- Mode: Single-player

Astlibra Revision is a 2D RPG side-scrolling action role-playing video game released on Nintendo Switch in November 2023, created by a solo Japanese video game developer KEIZO but with an initial release via free demo in February 2021 and via Steam on 13 October 2022. Its creator said that it took 16 years to develop. According to Nintendo Life, KEIZO was a "humble Japanese salaryman" who "started work on Astlibra because he felt there weren’t enough 2D action RPG games that filled the niche he most enjoyed".

A DLC expansion, titled Astlibra Gaiden: The Cave of Phantom Mist, was released on 13 February 2024 for Windows. A standalone version was released for Nintendo Switch on 17 October 2024.

== Plot ==
Astlibra Revision follows an unnamed protagonist fleeing from a horde of demons attacking his hometown. After running away, he finds himself trapped in one of the vast uninhabited Frontier lands of the world, with the raven Karon as his only companion. The protagonist then embarks in an eight-year journey with Karon to find his hometown and his childhood friend Anulis. As part of their journey, the duo finds the Libra scales, an artifact said to be able to change the past, and finally reach civilization.

== Reception ==
Reception

Aggregate scores
Aggregator	Score
Metacritic	79/100
OpenCritic	90% recommend

Review scores
Publication	Score
Famitsu	33/40
Nintendo Life	7/10
RPGFan	90/100

Astlibra Revision received "generally favorable" reviews from critics, according to the review aggregation website Metacritic. Fellow review aggregator OpenCritic assessed that the game received strong approval, being recommended by 90% of critics. In Japan, four critics from Famitsu gave the game a total score of 33 out of 40. Game Rant called the story "unique and captivating". Superpixel described the beginning of the game as "quite mundane," but "after a few weeks of in-game time, a rich worldview and comprehensive plot full of thoughtful twists slowly unfolds. Through Castlevania-style combat, players can complete the main quest and explore the dungeon."

RPGFan described it as a "mixed bag" but called the gameplay "superb" and said that the game does a "fantastic job of endearing you to the main character’s companions".

At the UCG Game Awards 2024, Astlibra Gaiden: The Cave of Phantom Mist won the Best DLC of the Year (Independent Game).
