= Tools Up! =

- Developer: The Knights of Unity
- Publisher: All in! Games SA
- Engine: Unity
- Platforms: PlayStation 4, Nintendo Switch, Microsoft Windows, Xbox One
- Release: December 3, 2019
- Genre: Action
- Modes: Single-player, multiplayer

Tools Up! is a local co-op party video game, developed by The Knights of Unity and published by All in! Games. The game was released for Microsoft Windows, PlayStation 4, Xbox One and Nintendo Switch in December 2019. In May 01, 2024 Tools Up! Ultimate Edition was released, this edition contained all updates, content, and downloadable content as well as a new player-versus-player mode.

== Gameplay ==
In Tools Up!, the players take the role of a home renovator. The goal is to renovate apartments within the time limit while the owners are away. They must complete tasks like painting, cleaning, moving furniture and redecorating. The game has two modes: Campaign Mode and the Party Mode, and up to four players can play together.

== Development ==
The concept for Tools Up! originated during a company party in March 2018. While playing cooperative multiplayer games like Overcooked and Gang Beasts, developer studio The Knights of Unity identified a market demand for accessible, couch co-op games. The home renovation theme was conceived by team member Rafał Polito. Developed using the Unity engine, the project focused on simplified mechanics. Before the release, Tools Up! was presented at several events, including Gamescom 2019, PAX West 2019, and Tokyo Game Show 2019. The developers focused on making the controls simple so players could focus on teamwork, with the hardest part of development being balancing the simplicity.

== Reception ==
Reception

Aggregate score
Aggregator	Score		
Aggregator	NS	PS4	Xbox One
Metacritic	62/100	72/100	62/100

Review scores
Publication	Score		
Publication	NS	PS4	Xbox One
Destructoid	6/10	N/A	N/A
Nintendo Life	6/10	N/A	N/A
Push Square	N/A	7/10	N/A

After the release, the game was met with "mixed or average" reviews from critics, with an aggregate score of 72/100 for PlayStation 4, and 62/100 for Nintendo Switch and Xbox One on Metacritic. The Escapist said that the game had a good concept, but needed "more polish". Le Soir criticized the lack of an online mode, noting that the game quickly shows its limits. Jordan Devore of Destructoid wrote that its simplistic gameplay fell short of its potential, but was nevertheless "enjoyable".
