= Masters of Anima =

2018 real-time tactics video game

- Developer: Passtech Games
- Publisher: Focus Home Interactive
- Director: Sylvain Passot
- Designers: Adrien Crochet; Pascal Biren
- Programmers: Sylvain Passot; Alban Guéret; Pierre Sénéclauze
- Artists: Valentin André-Terramorsi; Romane Govin; Mark Dutriez
- Writers: Adrien Crochet; Kurt McClung
- Composer: Leon Shelby
- Engine: OEngine
- Platforms: PlayStation 4, Xbox One, Windows, Nintendo Switch
- Release: April 10, 2018
- Genres: Real-time strategy, role-playing, puzzle
- Mode: Single-player

Masters of Anima is a 2018 real-time strategy video game developed by French studio Passtech Games.

== Plot ==
The plot follows Otto, a newly inducted member of a guild of magicians known as "shapers". The shapers' guild is attacked by the nefarious Zahr, who uses forbidden magics to kidnap the prime shaper, Ana. Otto must use the magic of the shapers to rescue Ana so that she can restore the world to its proper order.

== Gameplay ==
During gameplay, the player must control Otto and use his shaping magic to summon arbitrary combinations of 5 "guardians": Protectors, Sentinels, Keepers, Commanders, and Summoners. While Otto himself is controlled in a traditional third-person style, players must control the units indirectly through Otto by selecting them and issuing various commands (e.g., Attack, Move). Gameplay alternates between two primary modes: an exploration mode where the player's main focus is environment navigation and solving puzzles, and combat arenas where the player is locked into a specific space until they have defeated various hostile golems. Otto himself can directly affect the game, whether through attacking with his staff, activating special abilities for the units he has summoned, or activating puzzle elements. Story progression is broken up into discrete levels that progress linearly.

== Reception ==
Reception

Aggregate score
Aggregator	Score
Metacritic	NS: 76/100; PS4: 74/100; XONE: 74/100; Windows: 71/100

Review scores
Publication	Score
Nintendo Life	6/10
Nintendo World Report	8.5/10
RPGamer	3/5

Masters of Anima received generally positive reviews according to Metacritic.

== See also ==
- Pikmin
- Overlord
