= Keizō =

- Gender: Male

Origin
- Origin: Japanese
- Meaning: Different meanings depending on the kanji used

Keizō, Keizo or Keizou (written: 敬三, 敬蔵, 圭三, 啓三, 啓蔵, 啓造 or 慶蔵) is a masculine Japanese given name which can refer to:

- Keizo Dohi (土肥 慶蔵; 1866–1931), pseudonym Gakken, Japanese dermatologist and urologist
- Keizo Fukuda (born 1974), Japanese musician, member of Hifana
- Keizo Hasegawa (長谷川 敬三; 1922–1999), Japanese triple jumper
- Keizō Hayashi (林 敬三; 1907–1991), Japanese civil servant and general officer
- Keizo Hino (日野 啓三; 1929–2002), Japanese author
- Keizo Imai (今井 敬三; born 1950), Japanese footballer
- Keizō Kanie (蟹江 敬三; 1944–2014), Japanese actor
- Keizō Kitajima (北島 敬三; born 1954), Japanese photographer
- Keizō Komura (古村 啓蔵; 1896–1978), Imperial Japanese Navy admiral
- Keizō Kusakawa (草川 啓造), Japanese animation director
- Keizo Miura (三浦 敬三; 1904–2006), Japanese skier
- Keizo Nakanishi (中西 圭三; born 1964), Japanese singer-songwriter and composer
- Keizō Obuchi (小渕 恵三; 1937–2000), Japanese politician and Prime Minister of Japan
- Keizo Suzuki (鈴木 圭三; 1927–1945), Japanese Go player
- Keizo Takemi (武見 敬三; born 1951), Japanese politician
- Keizo Yamada (山田 敬蔵; 1927–2020), Japanese long-distance runner
