= Dungeons of Hinterberg =

2024 video game

- Developer: Microbird Games
- Publisher: Curve Games
- Directors: Regina Reisinger; Philipp Seifried
- Producer: Clio Montrey
- Designer: Oliver Moholi
- Programmer: Philipp Seifried
- Artist: Regina Reisinger
- Composers: David Zahradnicek; Markus Zahradnicek
- Engine: Unity
- Platforms: Windows; Xbox Series X/S; PlayStation 4; PlayStation 5
- Release: Windows, Xbox Series X/S; 18 July 2024; PS4, PS5; 13 March 2025
- Genre: Action role-playing
- Mode: Single-player

Dungeons of Hinterberg is an action role-playing video game developed by Austrian studio Microbird Games and published by Curve Games. Taking place in the fictional town of Hinterberg in the Austrian Alps, the game also features elements commonly found in dungeon crawling games and social simulation games. The game was released for Windows and Xbox Series X/S on 18 July 2024. Versions for the PlayStation 4 and PlayStation 5 were released on 13 March 2025.

== Gameplay ==
Dungeons of Hinterberg is an action role-playing video game played from a third-person view. In the game, the player character, Luisa, has the ability to use both weapons and magic against her enemies. The player character crawls through dungeons and fights monsters. Every one of the 25 dungeons in the games has unique mechanics. Along with the combat sections, there also social simulation segments too, where Luisa can befriend the villagers of Hinterberg, which can lead to perks that give her advantages in battle.

== Plot ==
The plot revolves around Luisa, a lawyer who came to the town of Hinterberg in the Austrian Alps as a vacation. Hinterberg has attracted tourists and thrillseekers after magical creatures and dungeons appear in the outskirts of the town mysteriously.

== Development and release ==
Dungeons of Hinterberg was developed by Austrian studio Microbird Games and published by Curve Games. Development of the game began in 2020, and it was Microbird's debut title. The social simulation gameplay was inspired by Persona, while the town of Hinterberg itself was inspired by Hallstatt.

The game was officially announced in June 2023. A limited playtest went between May 9 to 23, 2024, originally meant to last only a week but increased to two thanks to positive reception. The game was released on July 18, 2024, for Windows and the Xbox Series X and Series S. It was available on Xbox Game Pass from its first day of release. A PlayStation 5 version was released on March 13, 2025.

== Reception ==
Reception

Aggregate scores
Aggregator	Score
Metacritic	82/100
OpenCritic	87% recommend

Review scores
Publication	Score
Digital Trends	4.5/5
Eurogamer	4/5
Famitsu	33/40
GamesRadar+	4.5/5
PC Gamer (US)	84/100
PCGamesN	9/10
Shacknews	8/10

Dungeons of Hinterberg received "generally favorable" reviews according to review aggregator Metacritic. Fellow review aggregator OpenCritic assessed that the game received strong approval, being recommended by 87% of critics. PC Gamer gave it a score of 84/100, calling it "satisfyingly complex". Eurogamer gave it a score of 4 out of 5 stars. PCGamesN gave it a score of 9/10, praising its plot, graphics, and dungeon design. In Japan, four critics from Famitsu gave the game a total score of 33 out of 40.
