= Cat Quest III =

2024 video game

- Developer: The Gentlebros
- Publisher: Kepler Interactive
- Composer: Brian Havey (Zminusone)
- Engine: Unity
- Platforms: Xbox One; Xbox Series X/S; PlayStation 4; PlayStation 5; MacOS; Windows; Nintendo Switch
- Release: August 8, 2024
- Genre: Action role-playing
- Modes: Single-player, multiplayer

Cat Quest III (also titled as Cat Quest: Pirates of the Purribean) is a 2024 action role-playing game developed by The Gentlebros and published by Kepler Interactive. The third entry in the Cat Quest series, it was released on August 8, 2024, for Xbox One, Xbox Series X/S, PlayStation 4, PlayStation 5, Nintendo Switch, MacOS and Windows.

== Gameplay ==
Cat Quest III is an action role-playing game. Players control a cat on a journey to find the "North Star", a treasure capable of granting the wishes of whoever possesses it. Along the way, the cat must battle against other groups of pirates who seek this artifact. The player character can attack in melee with swords and other weapons, or attack from a distance with guns and magic wands. Spells can also be learned and cast to attack foes, and can afflict them with various effects. Players explore a world map composed of various islands, where they can travel on foot or across the ocean in a ship. The islands contain dungeons where the cat can fight enemies and obtain useful equipment. Crossing the ocean allows for combat with pirate ships, which the player fights using cannons. Aside from the main quest, players can complete side quests to earn rewards. The game has a local cooperative multiplayer mode.

== Story ==
The game opens with The Pi-Rat King destroying a boat. The only survivor is a kitten, which floats to shore and is found by a pirate ghost spirit named Cappey. Fifteen years later, Cappey and the cat, going by the name The Seeker, are looking The North Star, which has fallen into the Purribean and is said to grant whoever finds it great power. They quickly learn that The Pi-Rat King is also looking for The North Star, and is forcing other pirates to help him on his quest.

The Seeker and Cappey need to find three keys that open up the Polaris Ruins, where the first clue to the North Star is. They get the keys by defeating two ghosts of wardens, former keepers of the North Star, and the leader of the Boar Tribe, who reveals that the North Star originally belonged to his people before it was taken away. Now able to access the Polaris Ruins, they encounter the Pi-Rat King, who reveals that he has been following them as only a Seeker can get the clue. The two decide to keep moving forward, and find a key for the Infinity Tower.

At the Infinity Tower, they learn that the North Star is actually an alien who was imprisoned by the Wardens, who would use its power to grant their wishes. The alien shows them where to go next, and asks them to free it, with Cappey still wanting to, while Seeker is starting to grow suspicious.

In addition to finding the North Star, the pair needs to defeat two pirates who are also attempting to get the North Star for their own reasons. Meowtallika wants it to create an energy source for his people to live off of, while Takomeowki wants it to impress his father, but both agree to drop the search after being defeated. The Pi-Rat King reveals that he was cursed by a dragon named The Undying to live forever with a plague, and that he needs the power of the North Star to stop it.

The Seeker and Cappey discover the North Star is in the Sunset Islands. Upon entering the cave where it's kept, they are teleported to the Zero Dimension. While in the Zero Dimension, Cappey reveals that he started to fade away about a year ago and is hoping to use the North Star to stop it from happening. The Seeker meets Aelius, who explains that the North Star is the third artifact he needs to save his kind, and wishes The Seeker luck in finding it.

The Seeker and Cappey find the North Star, but the Pi-Rat King gets there first. They beat him in combat, and he chooses to leave with his crew, having realized that they will help him with his curse. The North Star offers to keep Cappey from fading away in exchange for The Seeker's life, but when it attempts to take The Seeker's life, Cappey sacrifices his own to save them. The Seeker manages to defeat the North Star, but Aelius appears and takes away its power before The Seeker can use it. However, he secretly uses it to revive Cappey

Elsewhere, Aelius brings the power of the North Star to other versions of himself in different timelines, so he can finally start the Apawcalypse.

== Reception ==
Reception

Aggregate scores
Aggregator	Score
Metacritic	NS: 86/100; PC: 83/100; PS5: 80/100; XSXS: 84/100
OpenCritic	85% recommend

Review scores
Publication	Score
Nintendo Life	9/10
Nintendo World Report	9.5/10
Shacknews	8/10

According to the review aggregate website Metacritic, Cat Quest III received "generally favorable reviews". Fellow review aggregator OpenCritic assessed that the game received strong approval, being recommended by 85% of critics. Nintendo Life called Cat Quest III one of the best indie games of 2024, and praised its visuals, quests, and combat. However, the reviewer felt that the game felt familiar to other games in the action role-playing genre. Shacknews enjoyed the writing, appreciating its inclusion of puns, and especially liked the bosses. Nintendo World Report liked the exploration and found the game "delightfully funny", but felt that it was too short.

The Academy of Interactive Arts & Sciences nominated Cat Quest III for "Family Game of the Year" at the 28th Annual D.I.C.E. Awards.
