= Iron Danger =

2020 action role-playing video game

- Developer: Action Squad Studios
- Publisher: Daedalic Entertainment
- Director: Jussi-Petteri Kemppainen
- Programmer: Heikki-Pekka Noronen
- Engine: Unity
- Platforms: Windows; PlayStation 5; Xbox Series X/S
- Release: Windows; March 25, 2020; PS5, Xbox Series X/S; August 16, 2023
- Genre: Action role-playing
- Mode: Single-player

Iron Danger is a steampunk action role-playing video game developed by Action Squad Studios and published by Daedalic Entertainment. The game is set in a fantasy steampunk world inspired by Finnish folklore and especially the national epic, Kalevala. The central game mechanic is trance mode, dubbed by some as a version of "save scumming", where the player can rewind time and retry moments of the game at the player's command. The game was released for Windows on March 25, 2020, and for PlayStation 5 and Xbox Series X/S on August 16, 2023.

== Reception ==
The PC version of Iron Danger received "mixed or average" reviews from critics, according to the review aggregation website Metacritic. PCGamesN's review said, "Save scumming is not only okay – it's now an elegant puzzle-solving game mechanic".

Iron Danger was awarded the Creative Achievement Of The Year at Finnish game Awards 2021.
