= Dandy Ace =

2021 video game

- Developer: Mad Mimic
- Publisher: Neowiz
- Engine: Unity Engine
- Platforms: Microsoft Windows; macOS; Nintendo Switch; PlayStation 4; Xbox One
- Release: macOS, Windows; March 25, 2021; Switch, Xbox One; September 28, 2021; PS4; November 15, 2021
- Genres: Roguelike, action role-playing
- Mode: Single-player

Dandy Ace is a 2021 roguelike action dungeon crawler video game developed by Mad Mimic and published by Neowiz. It was released for Microsoft Windows and macOS in March 25, 2021. Console ports for Xbox One and Nintendo Switch were later released in September 2021, and in November 2021 for the PlayStation 4 version.

Players control the titular Dandy Ace, a magician who attempts to escape from a procedurally generated world he is trapped in. He overcomes adversaries by using an assortment of magic cards to activate attacks and other abilities, with different combinations producing different results. Dandy Ace was met with a generally positive critical reception following its release, with many commentators comparing it to Hades, another notable video game that share some similarities in terms of design and gameplay.

== Gameplay ==
Dandy Ace is presented in an isometric view with the player in control of the title character, a flamboyant magician who is trapped within a cursed magic mirror alongside his assistants by a jealous rival named Lele, the self-styled Green-Eyed Illusionist. To escape, Dandy Ace must explore the mirror's procedurally generated labyrinthine pathways to search for an exit. Each run challenges the player to defeat Lele's forces using various attacks, special abilities and traversal techniques bestowed by a customized collection of up to four slotted magic cards. Each card can also be used as an upgrade for an existing card ability. Cards can be acquired through in-universe store purchases or as randomly generated loot from slain enemies and treasure chests. The game world is divided into a series of levels, with each level containing a series of teleporters, allowing the player character to quickly warp to other explored locations.

At the conclusion of each run, which is brought about by the defeat of Dandy Ace when he loses all hit points, players must rebuild their card collection. Players can use accumulated in-game currency to improve or unlock attributes and trinkets to increase the probability of a successful escape on subsequent runs. Dandy Ace is integrated with a Twitch mode, in which live-streaming players can request aid from viewers.

== Development and release ==
Dandy Ace was developed by Mad Mimic, a Brazilian independent game development studio based in São Paulo. The game was originally scheduled to be released on July 28, 2020, before it was delayed to a March 25, 2021 launch on Windows and MacOS, with console versions to be released later in the year. A playable demo was made available on the game’s Steam page. Ports for the Nintendo Switch and Xbox One were released on September 28, 2021. The PlayStation 4 version was released on November 15, 2021.

== Reception ==
Reception

Aggregate scores
Aggregator	Score
Metacritic	(Windows) 80/100 (XONE) 75/100
OpenCritic	100% recommend

Review scores
Publication	Score
Shacknews	8/10
Eurogamer Italy	7/10
Multiplayer.it	8/10
CD-Action	8/10

The Windows and Xbox One versions of Dandy Ace received generally favorable reviews according to review aggregator Metacritic. Fellow review aggregator OpenCritic assessed that the game received strong approval, being recommended by 100% of critics.

Donovan Erskine from Shacknews praised Dandy Ace's art style, sense of humour, and use of color. Erskine found the game to be challenging with its roguelike mechanics and selection of enemies, but noted the versatility of the card combat system and the freedom it offers players with the customization of card loadouts for their preferred playstyle. CD-Action similarly lauded the game's roguelike gameplay, appealing aesthetic, and combat system. Nicola Armondi from Multiplayer.it highlighted the game's emphasis on skill management as its core mechanic, which should be appealing to fans of the rogue-lite subgenre. Virginia Paravani from Eurogamer Italy noted that Dandy Ace has interesting gameplay that suffers from poor narration, and drew an unfavorable comparison to other roguelike games like Hades and Dead Cells.
