= Arboria =

2020 roguelike video game

- Developer: Dreamplant
- Publisher: All in! Games SA
- Platform: Microsoft Windows
- Release: May 2020
- Genre: Roguelike

Arboria is a dark fantasy 3D rogue-lite game developed by Dreamplant and published by All in! Games. The game was released for Microsoft Windows in Early Access on Steam in May 2020. A full release was planned for 2021.

== Gameplay ==
In Arboria, the player becomes a Yotun warrior. The goal is to explore the dungeons of Durnar and overcome enemies to heal the Father-Tree, Yggr, and collect a material called Veri to satisfy Godz. The gameworld is a mixture of dark fantasy aesthetic and mysterious, technologically advanced machinery, while some elements were inspired by Norse mythology.

Yotunz fight with a range of Symbiotic Weapons and use Bio-Mutations to become stronger. Upon death, the player takes the role of a new Yotun and can use the previously gathered Veri to upgrade the warrior. If the previous run was successful, the new character will be stronger; if not, he may receive negative traits.

Durnar is procedurally generated, so every run is different. The difficulty increases as the player progresses through different areas and main maps are separated by a special chamber, where the players can upgrade their Yotun warrior before moving forward.

== Development ==
Arboria was first announced in 2019 and became available in Early Access on Steam in 2020. The full release was planned for 2021.

== Reception ==
Reception

Aggregate scores
Aggregator	Score
Metacritic	75/100
OpenCritic	36% recommend

Arboria received generally favorable reviews from critics, according to the review aggregation website Metacritic. Fellow review aggregator OpenCritic assessed that the game received strong approval, being recommended by 36% of critics.
