= Cat Quest =

2017 action role-playing video game

- Developer: The Gentlebros
- Publisher: PQube
- Engine: Unity
- Platforms: macOS; Windows iOS; Android; Nintendo Switch; PlayStation 4
- Release: macOS, Windows: WW: 8 August 2017; iOS: WW: 10 August 2017; Android: WW: 15 September 2017; Nintendo Switch: WW: 10 November 2017; PlayStation 4: EU/AU: 10 November 2017; NA: 14 November 2017; AS: 24 November 2017
- Genre: Action role-playing
- Mode: Single-player

Cat Quest is an action role-playing game developed by The Gentlebros and published by PQube. It was released in 2017 and received generally positive reviews from critics.

== Gameplay ==
Cat Quest is an action role-playing video game played from a top-down perspective. The game is set in an open world kingdom called Felingard. The player takes controls of an anthropomorphic cat who embarks on a quest to rescue his kidnapped sister. The game features real-time combat, dungeon crawling, and equipment progression.

== Plot ==
The game starts with an opening cutscene showing the hero and his sister on a boat in the open sea. His sister is then abducted by a white cat who destroys the hero’s boat and disappears. While the hero is unconscious, it is revealed that he possesses a strange purple mark on the back of his head. Some time later, the hero washes on the shore of Felingard, an island kingdom ruled by cats. He is awoken by his guardian spirit, Spirry, who takes the hero to a mage to learn what the purple mark means. The mage reveals that the hero is a Dragonblood, one of a group of warriors who defeated Felingard's evil dragons a long time ago, but vanished mysteriously. The hero again encounters the white cat, who is revealed another Dragonblood named Drakoth. Drakoth offers to return the hero's sister if he defeats Felingard's dragons, and the hero resolves to defeat them.

It is eventually revealed that the Dragonblood were created by a long-dead race of beings called the Old Masters, with the primary creator of the Dragonblood being an Old Master named Aelius. After exploring a number of ruins throughout Felingard, the hero learns that many years ago, the Old Masters turned against Aelius and imprisoned him in a realm called the Zero Dimension. In response, Drakoth led the Dragonblood in a rebellion against the Old Masters, wiping out both races. With Spirry's help, the hero soon defeats Felingard's dragons, but unwittingly follows Drakoth into the Zero Dimension: There, Drakoth reveals that the hero has no sister, and that the opening cutscene was only a false memory created to get the hero to follow him. Spirry admits that Drakoth is actually his master, and that he has been training the hero to get stronger with the goal of luring him into the Zero Dimension. Explaining that the death of a powerful Dragonblood is needed to free Aelius, Drakoth fights the hero, but loses and is slain. The hero and Spirry make amends and flee the collapsing Zero Dimension: At the exit, the two witness Aelius leaving before them.

== Development and release ==
Cat Quest was developed by Singapore-based team The Gentlebros and published by PQube. Cat Quest was released for macOS and Windows on 8 August 2017, and 10 August 2017 for iOS. It was released for Android on 15 September 2017. The Nintendo Switch version was released on 10 November 2017. It was also released on the same day for PlayStation 4 in Europe, and on 14 November in North America. A physical release for the Nintendo Switch launched in September 2018 for Europe and North America. Tesla made Cat Quest available to play via their in-vehicle infotainment systems in the 2020 Holiday update (2020.48.25).

== Reception ==
Reception

Aggregate scores
Aggregator	Score
Metacritic	PC: 79/100 iOS: 89/100; NS: 74/100; PS4: 74/100
OpenCritic	76/100; 60% Critics Recommend

Review scores
Publication	Score
Gamezebo	4.5/5
Nintendo World Report	7/10
Pocket Gamer	8/10
Push Square	7/10
TouchArcade	5/5
VentureBeat	78/100

Cat Quest received "generally favorable" reviews from professional critics according to review aggregator website Metacritic.

=== Accolades ===
Cat Quest won the awards for "Best Adventure/Role Playing Game" and "Best Art Design" at Intel Level Up 2017. The game was nominated and won the Excellence in Visual Art and Design in the 2nd SEA International Mobile Gaming Awards 2017. It also received a nomination for "Mobile Game of the Year" at the AIAS' 21st Annual D.I.C.E. Awards.

== Sequels ==
In May 2018, the developers announced a sequel, then titled Cat Quest II: The Lupus Empire. It was released on 24 October 2019, for Windows (via Steam), Xbox One, PlayStation 4 and Nintendo Switch, and in Japan on 30 January 2020, simply titled Cat Quest II.

On August 8, 2024, Cat Quest III also known as Cat Quest: Pirates of the Purribean was released for Xbox One, Xbox Series X/S, PlayStation 4, PlayStation 5, Nintendo Switch, and Windows.
