= The Legend of Nayuta: Boundless Trails =

2012 video game

- Developer: Nihon Falcom (Note: Windows version ported by PH3 Games.)
- Publisher: NIS America: JP: Nihon Falcom
- Director: Takayuki Kusano
- Producer: Toshihiro Kondo
- Programmers: Syuuji Nishitani; Masaya Imura
- Writers: Syunsei Shikata; Yuuta Miyazaki; Aichiro Miyata; Katsuya Horimoto
- Composers: Hayato Sonoda; Takahiro Unisuga; Saki Momiyama
- Series: Trails
- Platforms: PlayStation Portable; PlayStation 4; Windows; Nintendo Switch
- Release: July 26, 2012: PlayStation Portable; JP: July 26, 2012 PlayStation 4; JP: June 24, 2021; NA: September 19, 2023; EU/AU: September 22, 2023 Windows; JP: December 11, 2021; WW: September 19, 2023 Nintendo Switch; JP: May 26, 2022; NA: September 19, 2023; EU/AU: September 22, 2023
- Genre: Action role-playing
- Mode: Single-player

The Legend of Nayuta: Boundless Trails (Note: Japanese: 那由多の軌跡, Hepburn: Nayuta no Kiseki) is a 2012 action role-playing game developed by Nihon Falcom. The game is a part of the Trails series, itself a part of the larger The Legend of Heroes series. It was first released in Japan for PlayStation Portable. A high-definition remaster was released in Japan for PlayStation 4 and Windows in 2021 and for Nintendo Switch in 2022. This version was localized in English by NIS America and released in September 2023.

== Gameplay ==
The Legend of Nayuta: Boundless Trails is an action role-playing game, with gameplay similar to Falcom's Ys series and Zwei: The Ilvard Insurrection. Combat actions include physical attacks, magical attacks known as Arts, and powerful abilities unique to each character known as Crafts. The game also features elements of platforming.

== Plot ==
The Legend of Nayuta: Boundless Trails is set in two worlds: the main characters' home world, and a mysterious world called Lost Heaven. The main characters' hometown is Remnant Island, located in the center of Ciencia Sea, a vast ocean with countless islands. Shooting stars have been continually falling from the sky for some time, leaving much of these piled up on the island. Stones known as "Star Fragments" have been discovered in these areas. By shining a light on them in a certain way, people can see the phantom world of Lost Heaven.

The story follows Nayuta Herschel, a young aspiring researcher aiming to see what exists further beyond the known world. Upon returning home to Remnant Island for the summer, he and his childhood friend Cygna Alhazen find themselves in the world of Lost Heaven through the guidance of the otherworldly fairy Noi. They get involved in a plot to stop a madman and his right-hand man from destroying Lost Heaven and potentially Nayuta's own world in the process.

== Release ==
The game was first released as Nayuta no Kiseki for the PlayStation Portable in Japan on July 26, 2012. A remaster, Nayuta no Kiseki: Kai, was released in Japan for PlayStation 4 on June 24, 2021. Various aspects of the game were improved: all characters received dialogue portraits, the illustrations for key events were remade, the frame rate was increased to 60 per second, and sound was replaced with higher-quality files. It was later released for Windows in Japanese on December 11, with the port handled by PH3 Games and published by NIS America. Another enhanced version, Nayuta no Kiseki: Ad Astra, was released in Japan for Nintendo Switch on May 26, 2022, and features the same improvements as the previous remaster. It was the first Switch game developed in-house by Falcom, with earlier ports of Ys and Trails games being outsourced to other companies.

An English fan translation of the PSP version was created and released in 2012, with one separately authored grammar and readability patch released later. An English version by NIS America was released for Nintendo Switch, PlayStation 4, and Windows in North America on September 19, 2023; the game was released in Europe and Oceania three days later.

== Reception ==
Reception

Aggregate scores
Aggregator	Score
Metacritic	(NS) 83/100 (PC) 80/100 (PS4) 75/100
OpenCritic	73% recommend

The Nintendo Switch, PC, and PlayStation 4 versions of The Legend of Nayuta: Boundless Trails all received generally favorable reviews from critics, according to the review aggregation website Metacritic. Fellow review aggregator OpenCritic assessed that the game received strong approval, being recommended by 73% of critics.
