= All in! Games =

Polish video game publisher

All in! Games SA
- Type: Public
- Industry: Video games
- Founded: 2018
- Headquarters: Kraków, Poland
- Website: www.allingames.com

All in! Games SA is a video game publisher based in Kraków, Poland. All in! Games publishes games on all main gaming platforms (PC, PS4, Xbox One, and Nintendo Switch) working on international projects.

== History ==
The company was formed in 2018 by Tomasz Majewski, Maciej Łaś, and Łukasz Nowak. The shareholders are Maciej Łaś, Piotr Żygadło, Łukasz Nowak, Tomasz Majewski, and January Ciszewski.

In October 2019, Setanta signed a plan to merge with All in! Games. The merger was finalized in 2020.

On October 16, 2019 it was announced that All in! Games obtained naming rights and sponsorship of the Wisła Kraków esports section. Wisła All in! Games Kraków is the official name of the team.

All in! Games titles were presented in 2019 at a number of video game fairs: GDC, Nordic Game, Gamescom, Digital Dragons, Tokyo Game Show, PAX Seattle and Poznań Game Arena.

== Games ==
Title	Developer	Year	Platforms	Notes
Phantom Hellcat	Ironbird Creations	TBA	PC, PS4, PS5, Xbox One, Xbox Series X/S	
Exo One	Exbleative	2024	PS4, PS5	
Backfirewall_	Naraven Games	2023	PC, PS4, PS5, Xbox One, Xbox Series X/S, Nintendo Switch	
Red Wings: American Aces	Ironbird Creations, All In! Games	2022	PC, Nintendo Switch	Co-developed by All In! Games and published by Untold Tales
Arboria	Dreamplant	2021	PC	Early Access since 2020
Chernobylite	The Farm 51	2021	PC, PS4, PS5, Xbox One, Xbox Series X	
Lumberhill	2BIGo, ARP Games	2021	PC, Nintendo Switch	
Paradise Lost	PolyAmorous	2021	PC, PS4, Xbox One	
Ghostrunner	One More Level, Slipgate Ironworks	2020	PC, PS4, Xbox One, Nintendo Switch	Co-publisher 505 Games acquired Ghostrunner IP from All in! Games in 2021.
Metamorphosis	Ovid Works	2020	PC, PS4, Xbox One, Nintendo Switch	
Fort Triumph	CookieByte Entertainment	2020	PC, PS4, Xbox One, Nintendo Switch	Early Access since 2018
Of Bird and Cage	Capricia Productions	2022	PC, PS4, Xbox One	
Red Wings: Aces of the Sky	All in! Games	2020	PC, PS4, Xbox One, Nintendo Switch	
It came from space and ate our brains	Triangle Studios	2020	PS4, Xbox One, Nintendo Switch	
Tools Up!	The Knights of Unity	2019	PC, PS4, Xbox One, Nintendo Switch	
Little Racer	The Knights of Unity	2019	Nintendo Switch	
Deadlings	One More Level	2019	Nintendo Switch	
Space Cows	Happy Corruption	2019	PC, Nintendo Switch	
Space Company Simulator	INTERMARUM	TBA	PC	Early Access since 2019
