= Biomutant =

2021 action role-playing video game

- Promotional artwork
- Developer: Experiment 101
- Publisher: THQ Nordic
- Director: Stefan Ljungqvist
- Designer: Torkel Forner
- Programmers: Per Johansson; Nikolai Nyqvist; Artan Grajqevci; Michael Grünewald
- Artists: Marcus Perrson; Fadi Asar; Nils Friberg
- Writers: Stefan Ljungqvist; Matt Forbeck
- Composer: Björn Palmberg
- Engine: Unreal Engine 4
- Platforms: Windows; PlayStation 4; PlayStation 5; Xbox One; Xbox Series X/S; Nintendo Switch
- Release: PS4, Windows, Xbox One; May 25, 2021; PS5, Xbox Series X/S; September 6, 2022; Nintendo Switch; May 14, 2024
- Genre: Action role-playing
- Mode: Single-player

Biomutant is an action role-playing game developed by Swedish developer Experiment 101 and published by THQ Nordic. The game was released on May 25, 2021, for PlayStation 4, Windows, and Xbox One. Versions of the game for PlayStation 5 and Xbox Series X/S were released in September 2022. A port for the Nintendo Switch was released in May 2024. The game received mixed reviews from critics and sold 1 million units by August 2021.

== Gameplay ==
Biomutant is an action role-playing game set in an open world environment and played from a third-person perspective in which the player takes control of a mammalian warrior in a world filled with mutated animals. Players customize their character including length, body shape and thickness, fur, fangs, and many other attributes that can be tweaked and all have direct impact on the statistics of the playable character during gameplay. A thicker character is heavier, which makes it slower but conversely allows it to deal and resist more damage.

The protagonist is able to dodge to the left, right, and backward, as well as jump. The combat system combines melee attacks with long-range shooting. The player collects parts throughout the game and combines these parts to create a weapon. Each part has its own effect on the statistics of the end product. The game features a variety of Affixes, including cryogenic and electrical, which are effective in battles. When a cryogenic part is put onto a weapon, enemies will freeze when hit. The player can combine the power of multiple weapons by switching between different weapons during combat.

Besides leveling up the playable character, the player can use level up points to strengthen their attributes or to unlock new attack combinations. Another way to learn new moves is by interacting with specific characters in each area. Most moves are based on weapons, which can be crafted using the game's weapon crafting system.

Throughout the game, players can change their abilities, looks by mutations, and apply upgrades to their robotic companion, which can be used to get various advantages against certain enemies or at certain locations. In order to reach specific areas, the player must equip gear that is suited for that area, or obtain specific vehicles, such as an air balloon or jet skis. This way, the player can overcome obstacles introduced by their surroundings, such as the limited oxygen availability in the Deadzone: by wearing a gas mask or an oxygen container, the player is able to venture deeper into the area and explore new places that cannot be reached without any precautions, while an even bigger part of the area can be reached by obtaining a mech. The game's world can be seamlessly explored by the player on foot, by flying or using an air balloon, jet ski and mech. It features a dynamic weather system and day-night cycle which affect the gameplay and enemy behaviour.

The story is mission-based and mission lines are character-based. Certain characters will provide the player quest lines that are emanating from their area. The more the player interacts with this character, the wider the arc of that specific area becomes.

Biomutant features a Karma system for interactions with non-playable characters and an alliance system to influence the in-game tribal war. Depending on the actions, interactions, and decisions made by the player throughout the whole game, the stances characters take can change, which has an influence on the continuation of the story as dialogues and quest lines will be changed. The story is fully narrated, though as playtime increases, the narration level scales down. Players are able to manually adjust the narration frequency.

== Plot ==
Biomutant has branching storylines where decisions made by the player will decide how the story will continue. The main plot revolves around the "Tree of Life", which is struck by a natural disaster and becomes polluted by poisonous oil from beneath the soil. The five roots of the Tree, through which it gives life to the whole world, come under threat from five creatures who begin slowly gnawing at them, threatening to kill the Tree before it can heal itself. The situation is further complicated by six tribes, each split from their original enclave. Three of them want to heal the Tree of Life and restore the natural balance of the world, while the other three see an opportunity to expand their territory and power.

Each tribe can be influenced through the Karma system. The player can ally with a tribe and eliminate other tribes in order to grow the power of the allied tribe in the world, although the player can decide on the Tree of Life's fate without having to eliminate any of the tribes if they want to.

== Development and release ==
Biomutant is the first game by the Swedish development studio Experiment 101, which was established in 2015 by former Avalanche Studios employees. After working on the Just Cause series for many years, the founders of the studio wanted to go back to the basics of video game development and create a game that is "fun in a good way". Experiment 101 has a flat organization and had 18 employees in August 2018. Development on Biomutant started after the foundation of the studio.

On 19 August 2017, an advertisement in the German gaming magazine GamesMarkt revealed the existence of the game, dubbing it as a "post-apocalyptic kung-fu fable", before being fully announced on 21 August. The game was playable later that week at the German trade show Gamescom. In an interview which was published the day after the announcement of the game, Experiment 101's head of studio Stefan Ljungqvist said that the game already was content complete. He mentioned that one of the most difficult things for the development team was to balance the combat system in order to "combine shooting, melee [attacks], and abilities in a quite intuitive way". Unreal Engine 4 is used for the game.

On 26 January 2021, it was announced that the game would be released for Windows, PlayStation 4, and Xbox One on May 25, 2021. Versions for PlayStation 5 and Xbox Series X/S followed on September 6, 2022. A port for Nintendo Switch was initially scheduled to release on November 30, 2023, but was delayed. In late February 2024, the companies announced that the Switch port would be released on May 14, 2024.

== Reception ==
Reception

Aggregate scores
Aggregator	Score
Metacritic	PC: 67/100; PS4: 63/100; XONE: 68/100; PS5: 69/100; XSeries: 79/100; Switch: 59/100
OpenCritic	36% recommend

Review scores
Publication	Score
Destructoid	8/10
Electronic Gaming Monthly	2/5
Game Informer	6.5/10
GameSpot	6/10
GamesRadar+	3/5
IGN	6/10
Jeuxvideo.com	15/20
PC Gamer (US)	60/100

Biomutant received "mixed or average reviews" according to Metacritic.

Luke Reilly of IGN awarded the game a 6/10, writing, "Biomutant has a lot of the building blocks of a top-drawer action RPG but its cookie-cutter approach to objectives and puzzles starts feeling very repetitive very early on."

In Japan, the PlayStation 4 version of Biomutant was the second bestselling retail game during its first week of release, with 24,596 physical units being sold. As of August 18, 2021, the game sold more than 1 million units.
