= Cat Quest II =

2019 video game

- Developer: The Gentlebros
- Publisher: PQube
- Platforms: iOS; macOS; PlayStation 4; Windows; Xbox One; Nintendo Switch
- Release: iOS, macOS; September 19, 2019; PS4, Windows, Xbox One; September 24, 2019; Switch; October 24, 2019
- Genre: Action role-playing
- Modes: Single-player, multiplayer

Cat Quest II (sometimes stylized as Cat Quest II: The Lupus Empire) is a 2019 action role-playing game developed by The Gentlebros and published by PQube. A sequel to Cat Quest (2017), It was released on September 19, 2019, for iOS and macOS as a launch title for Apple Arcade, September 24, 2019 for PlayStation 4, Windows, and Xbox One, and for Nintendo Switch on October 24, 2019. In the game, players take control of a cat king and a dog king as they work together towards reclaiming their kingdoms from tyranny. The game received generally positive reviews on release.

== Gameplay ==
Cat Quest II is an action role-playing game. Players take control of a cat and a dog—two kings removed from their thrones—as they work together to reclaim their kingdoms from tyranny. In single-player, the player takes control of one character, while the game controls the other; both cat and dog can be switched between manually. In cooperative multiplayer, a second player can take control of either the cat or the dog. Both the cat and dog can attack, cast spells, and dodge. Weapons range from melee armaments that allow for attacking enemies at close range, to magic weapons that permit the wielder to fire off ranged attacks at the cost of reducing their health. The game features two distinct areas which have towns and enemies, as well as dungeons that players can explore in order to claim new spells and other rewards. Aside from the main quest centered around the story, players can also complete side quests.

== Story ==
The game opens with a cutscene foretelling a prophecy: A cat and a dog king both fell to the corruption of a great evil, but they would eventually return and redeem themselves as heroes. The two heroes are awoken from slumber by a spirit named Kirry, who tells them that their respective kingdoms have been taken over by usurpers named Lioner and Wolfen. The heroes travel across Lioner's cat kingdom Felingard and Wolfen's dog realm the Lupus Empire, searching for ways to overthrow the usurpers while preventing conflict between the kingdoms. Eventually, the heroes learn of a legendary weapon called the Kingsblade, and begin to reforge it. Before the blade can be finished, the heroes are ambushed and taken to a realm called the Zero Dimension. There, a being named Aelius reveals himself to be the usurpers' master: He tells the heroes that they are actually Lioner and Wolfen from an alternative timeline, having been taken from their world by Kirry.

Kirry admits to the heroes that he fabricated the prophecy, stole them from an alternative timeline, and erased their memories, hoping that they would fight against Aelius and foil his evil schemes. Aelius leaves the heroes and Kirry trapped in the Zero Dimension, but the three escape. They make amends, and learn that Lioner and Wolfen are planning a war between their kingdoms to fight over Aelius' favor. The heroes avert the war by slaying Lioner and Wolfen, but are soon forced to fight Aelius himself. Kirry arrives at the battlefield with a force composed of cats and dogs, and their unity prompts the Kingsblade to magically reforge itself. The heroes defeat Aelius with the blade, reconcile with their friends, and return to their original timeline with Kirry's help. In a post-credits scene, it is shown that Aelius survived being attacked with the Kingsblade, and that he plans to use it in order to start "the Apawcalypse".

== Reception ==
Reception

Aggregate scores
Aggregator	Score
Metacritic	PC: 76/100; PS4: 78/100; NS: 77/100
OpenCritic	77/100; 76% Critics Recommend

According to the review aggregator website Metacritic, Cat Quest II received "generally favorable reviews" for its PC, Switch, and PS4 versions. RPGamer considered the game to be an improvement over its predecessor, and praised the combat and story, but felt as though the main quest distracted the player from finding side quests. Push Square liked the artstyle and called combat "satisfying" but considered the design of dungeons to be repetitive. Hardcore Gamer enjoyed the implementation of multiplayer and ranged weapons, feeling as though the game may appeal to those that did not enjoy Cat Quest.

== Sequel ==
On August 8, 2024, Cat Quest III also known as Cat Quest: Pirates of the Purribean was released for Xbox One, Xbox Series X/S, PlayStation 4, PlayStation 5, Nintendo Switch, and Windows.
