= Fellow Traveller Games =

Australian video game publisher

Surprise Attack Pty Ltd
- Traded as: Fellow Traveller Games
- Industry: Video games
- Founded: October 2011
- Founders: Chris Wright
- Website: fellowtraveller.games

Surprise Attack Pty Ltd, trading as Fellow Traveller Games, is an Australian video game publisher. Chris Wright founded the company in 2011 as a marketing consultancy. It announced publishing label Surprise Attack Games in 2013 and relaunched the company as Fellow Traveller Games in 2018.

== History ==
Surprise Attack was founded in October 2011 by Chris Wright, who previously worked as marketing director for Blue Tongue Entertainment. Wright also assessed game loan applications for Film Victoria, where he noticed that many developers did not consider marketing. This led to founding Surprise Attack as a marketing consultancy firm for independent game developers. In November, Wright commented that many games were being released "without edit" for 15-year-olds in Australia that were restricted in the United States and Europe. He believed that the Australian Classification Board needed an "R18+ rating" for games, which legislation had recently approved implementation for.

In July 2013, it launched publishing label Surprise Attack Games providing funding, marketing and distribution as Australia's first independent indie game publisher. In July 2018, the company relaunched as Fellow Traveller Games, focusing on unusual narrative games. When Kotaku Australia enquired about the changed direction from showcasing Australian games, Wright stated they realised that while the industry appreciated their local publishing, consumers were not interested in where a game was made. He believed an identity with an established flavour or style of game is needed to stand out in the market, noting that 3-4% of the Steam purchases were Australian. In April 2019, Fellow Traveller announced digital convention LudoNarraCon celebrating narrative games. The event ran from 10 to 13 May, with livestreamed panels hosted on storefront Steam.

== Games published ==
Release	Title	Developer(s)	Platform(s)	Ref.
2014	Oscura: Second Shadow	Chocolate Liberation Front	iOS	
2014	Screencheat	Samurai Punk	Linux, Windows, Nintendo Switch, PlayStation 4, Xbox One	
2014	Vertiginous Golf	Kinelco, Lone Elk Creative	Linux, Windows, macOS	
2015	Hacknet	Team Fractal Alligator	Linux, Windows, macOS	
2017	Think of the Children	Jammed Up Studios	Windows, Nintendo Switch, PlayStation 4, Xbox One	
2018	Orwell: Ignorance is Strength	Osmotic Studios	Linux, Windows, macOS	
2018	Hiveswap Friendsim	What Pumpkin Games	Linux, Windows, macOS, Nintendo Switch, PlayStation 4, PlayStation 5, Android	
2018	Framed Collection	Loveshack Entertainment	Linux, Windows, macOS, Nintendo Switch	
2018	Blind	Tiny Bull Studios	PlayStation VR, Windows	
2019	The Stillness of the Wind	Lambic Studios, Memory of God	iOS, iPadOS, Windows, MacOS, Nintendo Switch	
2019	The Church in the Darkness	Paranoid Productions	Linux, Windows, MacOS, Nintendo Switch, PlayStation 4, Xbox One	
2019	Pesterquest	What Pumpkin Games	Linux, Windows, macOS, Nintendo Switch, PlayStation 4, PlayStation 5, Android	
2019	Neo Cab	Chance Agency	iOS, iPadOS, TvOS, Linux, Windows, macOS, Nintendo Switch	
2020	In Other Waters	Jump Over the Age	Linux, Windows, macOS, Nintendo Switch	
2020	Paradise Killer	Kaizen Game Works	Linux, Windows, Nintendo Switch, PlayStation 4, PlayStation 5, Xbox One, Xbox Series X/S	
2020	Suzerain	Torpor Games	Android, iOS, iPadOS, Linux, Windows, macOS, Nintendo Switch	
2021	Genesis Noir	Feral Cat Den	Linux, Windows, macOS, Nintendo Switch, Xbox One	
2021	The Invisible Hand	Power Struggle Games	Linux, Windows	
2021	No Longer Home	Humble Grove	Linux, Windows, macOS, Nintendo Switch, Xbox One, Xbox Series X/S, PlayStation 4, PlayStation 5	
2021	Kraken Academy!!	Happy Broccoli Games	Linux, Windows, macOS, Nintendo Switch, Xbox One	
2022	Glitchhikers: The Spaces Between	Silverstring Media Inc.	Windows, macOS, Nintendo Switch	
2022	Citizen Sleeper	Jump Over The Age	Linux, Windows, Nintendo Switch, Nintendo Switch 2, Xbox One, Xbox Series X/S, PlayStation 4, PlayStation 5	
2022	Beacon Pines	Hiding Spot	Linux, Windows, Nintendo Switch, Xbox One	
2023	The Pale Beyond	Bellular Studios	Linux, Windows, macOS, Nintendo Switch	
2024	1000xRESIST	Sunset Visitor	Windows, Nintendo Switch, PlayStation 5, Xbox Series X/S, Nintendo Switch 2	
2024	Times & Galaxy	Copychaser Games	Windows, Nintendo Switch, Xbox One, Xbox Series X/S, PlayStation 5	
2024	Great God Grove	LimboLane	Windows, Nintendo Switch, Xbox Series X/S	
2024	Pine: A Story of Loss	Made Up Games	iOS, Windows, Nintendo Switch	
2025	Citizen Sleeper 2: Starward Vector	Jump Over the Age	Windows, macOS, Nintendo Switch, Nintendo Switch 2, PlayStation 5, Xbox Series X/S	
2025	Afterlove EP	Pikselnesia	Windows, Nintendo Switch, PlayStation 5, Xbox Series X/S	
2025	Kulebra and the Souls of Limbo	Galla	Windows, macOS, Nintendo Switch, Xbox One, Xbox Series X/S	
2025	Wander Stars	Paper Castle Games	Windows, Nintendo Switch, PlayStation 5, Xbox Series X/S	
2026	Titanium Court	AP Thomson	Windows, macOS, Android, iOS, Nintendo Switch, Nintendo Switch 2, PlayStation 5	
2026	Penguin Colony	Origame Digital	Windows, Nintendo Switch 2	
2026	The Hearth & Harbour	Saltstone Studios	Windows	
2027	Burn-9	14 Hours Productions	Windows	
2027	Red Kiss	Wispfire	Windows, Xbox Series X/S	
TBA	Nirvana Noir	Feral Cat Den	Windows, Xbox Series X/S	
TBA	Scrabdackle	jakefriend	Windows	
TBA	Signet City	Jump Over the Age	Windows	
