= Guillaume Singelin =

French illustrator, cartoonist, and writer (born 1987)

- Born: 10 January 1987 (age 39); Rennes, France
- Occupation: Cartoonist
- Years active: 2010–present

Guillaume Singelin (French: [ɡi.jom sɛ̃.ʒɛ.lɛ̃]; born 10 January 1987) is an illustrator, writer, and cartoonist. He is best known for his graphic novels PTSD (2019) and Frontier (2023), and for his illustration in DoggyBags (2011–2019) by Run, The Grocery (2011–2016) by Aurélien Ducoudray, and Loba Loca (2019–2020) by Run.

== Biography ==
Guillaume Singelin was born on 10 January 1987 in Rennes, France.

He is a cartoonist based in France. Singelin has illustrated numerous comic books and graphic novels, including Pills (2010) by Antoine Ozanam, DoggyBags (2011–2019) by Run, The Grocery (2011–2016) by Aurélien Ducoudray, Midnight Tales (2018) by Mathieu Bablet and Elsa Bordier, Loba Loca (2019–2020) by Run, Batman: Urban Legends (2022–2023) by Tim Seeley, and LowReader (2022) by Run.

In 2016 Singelin published his first comic with Peow Studio, titled Junky. In 2019, he published graphic novel PTSD, telling a story about a war veteran struggling with the post-traumatic stress disorder in Hong Kong-inspired metropolis. Singelin published another graphic novel in 2023, titled Frontier. The science fiction work depicts lives of people in the future in which humans colonised outer space. It won the Prix Landerneau award in the graphic novel category, as well as the Éco-Fuave Raja Award at the Angoulême International Comics Festival.

Singelin also worked a storyboard artist and in 2017 animated film Mutafukaz, and helped develop its artstyle, based on the source comics series. He was also a character artist for 2022 video game Citizen Sleeper, and the key artist for 2023 video game Gunbrella. In 2023, he was nominated in three categories for his work on Citizen Sleeper at the 19th British Academy Games Awards.

== Works ==
=== Comic books and graphic novels ===
- 2010: Pills (illustrator; Casterman; ISBN 9782203018365)
- 2011: DoggyBags, vol. 1 (illustrator; Ankama; ISBN 9782359101294)
- 2011: The Grocery, vol. 1 (illustrator; Ankama; ISBN 9782359101515)
- 2012: DoggyBags, vol. 2 (illustrator; Ankama; ISBN 9782359102598)
- 2013: DoggyBags, vol. 4 (illustrator; Ankama; ISBN 9782359104325)
- 2014: DoggyBags, vol. 6: HeartBreaker (illustrator; Ankama; ISBN 9782359104790)
- 2014: The Grocery, vol. 2 (illustrator; Ankama; ISBN 9782359103359)
- 2014: The Grocery, vol. 3 (illustrator; Ankama; ISBN 9782359104684)
- 2015: Before The Grocery (illustrator; Ankama; ISBN 9782359105421)
- 2016: Junky (writer and illustrator; Peow Studio)
- 2016: The Grocery, vol. 4 (illustrator; Ankama; ISBN 9782359105438)
- 2018: DoggyBags – One-Shot : Sangs d'Encre (illustrator; Ankama; ISBN 9791033509424)
- 2018: Midnight Tales, vol. 1 (illustrator; Ankama; ISBN 9791033509264)
- 2019: DoggyBags: Fresh, Flesh & Hot Chrome (illustrator; Ankama; ISBN 9791033510154)
- 2019: DoggyBags: Geronimo (illustrator: Ankama; ISBN 9791033510161)
- 2019: Loba Loca, vol. 1 (illustrator; Ankama; ISBN 9791033509554)
- 2019: Loba Loca, vol. 2 (illustrator; Ankama; ISBN 9791033509592)
- 2019: Loba Loca, vol. 3 (illustrator; Ankama; ISBN 9791033509615)
- 2019: PTSD (writer and illustrator; Ankama; ISBN 9791033509530)
- 2020: Loba Loca, vol. 4 (illustrator; Ankama; ISBN 9791033509707)
- 2020: Loba Loca, vol. 5 (illustrator; Ankama; ISBN 9791033509745)
- 2020: Loba Loca, vol. 6. (illustrator; Ankama; ISBN 9791033509752)
- 2022: Batman: Urban Legends, vol. 1, issue 7 (writer and illustrator; DC Comics)
- 2022: DC vs. Vampires: All-Out War, vol. 1 (penciller; DC Comics)
- 2022: LowReader, vol. 1 (illustrator; Rue de Sèvres; ISBN 9782810202430)
- 2022: LowReader, vol. 2 (illustrator and writer; Rue de Sèvres; ISBN 9782810202515)
- 2023: Batman: Urban Legends, vol. 4 (illustrator; DC Comics; ISBN 9781779517548)
- 2023: Frontier (writer and illustrator; Rue de Sèvres; ISBN 9782810206520)

=== Others ===
- 2017: Mutafukaz (feature film; storyboard artist)
- 2021: Bravery Network Online (video game; character artist)
- 2022: Citizen Sleeper (video game; character artist)
- 2023: Gunbrella (video game; key artwork)
- 2025: Citizen Sleeper 2: Starward Vector (video game; character artist)
