= Kent Carroll =

American writer and publisher

Kent Carroll (born 1941) is the publisher of Europa Editions. He was formerly editor-in-chief of Grove Press, and co-founder, publisher, and editor-in-chief of Carroll & Graf.

== Early life ==
Kent Carroll was born in Binghamton, New York, to George Henry Carroll and Ruth Traver Carroll, and raised in North Tonawanda, New York. After graduating from Princeton in 1963, he spent time in West Africa and Europe before returning to the United States to earn an MA in history from the University of Wisconsin–Madison. He moved to New York City in 1968, where he worked for a major movie studio and then as a reporter/critic for a newspaper before beginning his publishing career.

== Grove Press ==
Carroll joined Grove Press in 1969 and from 1973 to 1980 served as editorial director working with publisher Barney Rosset. Grove had redefined the literary landscape of America by publishing such authors as Nobel Laureates Samuel Beckett, Kenzaburō Ōe, and Harold Pinter; Tom Stoppard, David Mamet; Henry Miller; and Marguerite Duras. He also wrote for Grove's magazine, Evergreen Review, as well as acquired American Graffiti (made into a George Lucas film), Gilbert Sorrentino's Mulligan's Stew, and the Pulitzer Prize-winning A Confederacy of Dunces, among others.

== Film ==
During a leave of absence from Grove Press, Carroll wrote and produced the feature film Abduction, featuring Academy Award winner Dorothy Malone.

== Carroll & Graf Publishers ==
Along with Herman Graf, Carroll founded Carroll & Graf Publishers in 1981, where he served as the Publisher and editor-in-chief until 2001. The firm was best known for publishing quality fiction, history, and biography. Among the many writers Carroll editing and published were Beryl Bainbridge (five-time Man Booker Prize winner), Ferdinand Mount (Times Literary Supplement editor and Hawthornden Prize winner), Madeleine St John (Man Booker Prize nominee), Jane Gardam (two-time Man Booker Prize nominee and two-time Whitbread Award winner), Auberon Waugh, Andrew Barr (Drink was named Book of the Year by Food & Wine magazine), Camilla Gibb (Toronto Book Prize winner), Anthony Burgess, Philip K. Dick, Penelope Fitzgerald (Man Booker Prize winner), D.M. Thomas, John O'Hara, Joseph McElroy, Alexandra Richie, James Le Fanu (The Rise and Fall of Modern Medicine won the 2001 Los Angeles Times Book Award), George MacDonald Fraser (of Flashman fame), and Denise Mina (Exile won the John Creasey Award).

Other authors published by Carroll & Graf Publishers include Michael Shaara (Pulitzer Prize winner), international best-seller A.E. Hotchner (Papa Hemingway), Alfred Lansing (whose account of Ernest Shackleton's epic Antarctic adventure, Endurance, was a New York Times best-seller and sold more than 1 million copies), Apsley Cherry-Garrard (whose The Worst Journey in the World was selected as the greatest adventure book of all time by National Geographic), Bartle Bull, Salley Vickers, Best Evidence [David Lifton], which was a Book of the Month Club selection, and Jim Marrs (whose best-selling Crossfire was made into Oliver Stone's JFK (1991)). Carroll also launched the careers of James Sallis (The Long-Legged Fly), Michelle de Kretser (The Rose Grower), Chris Bohjalian (Hangman), and David Benioff (25th Hour).

== Europa Editions ==
In 2004, Carroll and Italian publisher Sandro Ferri started Europa Editions, an American company that publishes European literature in translation as well as US and UK literary fiction and high-end crime fiction. In 2005 Europa published its first novel, Elena Ferrante's Days of Abandonment, which was favorably compared to Anna Karenina by The New York Times. Later releases have received great acclaim: Jane Gardam's Old Filth was short-listed for the Orange Prize and named a Notable Book of the Year by The New York Times; Steve Erickson's Zeroville was selected as a Best Book of the Year by Newsweek, Los Angeles Times, and National Public Radio; and Muriel Barbery's The Elegance of the Hedgehog was a New York Times Bestseller.

Other novels published by Europa under Carroll's leadership include Damon Galgut's In a Strange Room (a finalist for the Man Booker Prize in 2010); Pure, Andrew Miller's historical novel that won both the Best Novel and the Book of the Year Costa Book Award in 2011; Kate Southwood's Falling to Earth (a Barnes & Noble Discover Great New Writers Selection); and The Rage, Gene Kerrigan's novel that was awarded the Gold Dagger Best Crime Novel of the Year Award by the Crime Writers' Association. In 2013, Europa was named Publisher of the Year by the New Atlantic Independent Booksellers Association.

== Authors ==
Carroll has published:

- Brian Aldiss
- Eric Ambler
- Diana Athill
- J.G. Ballard
- Sybille Bedford
- David Benioff
- George Bernanos
- Lesley Blanch
- Anthony Burgess
- Apsley Cherry-Garrard
- Lady Diana Cooper
- Philip K. Dick
- J. G. Farrell
- Penelope Fitzgerald
- George MacDonald Fraser
- Mavis Gallant
- Jane Gardam
- Knut Hamsun
- Dorothy B. Hughes
- Henry James
- Norman Mailer
- Joseph McElroy
- Henry Miller
- John O'Hara
- James Sallis
- Michael Shaara
- Gilbert Sorrentino
- Peter Taylor
- D.M. Thomas
- Auberon Waugh

== Teaching ==
Carroll has lectured at writers' conferences and spoken on television and radio as well as before university audiences about various aspects of the writing profession and the publishing business. He is also on the faculty of The Writers' Institute at The Graduate Center at The City University of New York.

== Other projects ==
Carroll, along with Jodee Blanco, was the co-author of Ryan O'Neal's Both of Us: My Life with Farrah which was, briefly, on The New York Times best-seller list.
