= Endurance: Shackleton's Incredible Voyage =

1959 book written by Alfred Lansing

- First edition
- Author: Alfred Lansing
- Language: English
- Subject: Imperial Trans-Antarctic Expedition
- Genre: Non-fiction
- Publisher: Hodder & Stoughton
- Publication date: 1959

Endurance: Shackleton's Incredible Voyage, is a 1959 book written by Alfred Lansing, about the failure of the Imperial Trans-Antarctic Expedition led by Sir Ernest Shackleton, in its attempt to cross the Antarctic continent in 1914.

== Synopsis ==
The book details the almost two-year struggle for survival endured by the twenty-eight man crew of the exploration ship Endurance. The ship was beset and eventually crushed by ice floes in the Weddell Sea, leaving the men stranded on the pack ice. All in all, the crew drifted on a series of ice floes for just over a year, facing a second survival crisis when their final floe melted into the cold salty water that surrounded it. They had salvaged three small ship’s boats, and were able to launch them into the Southern Ocean. The castaways managed to land themselves safely on Elephant Island, off the coast of Antarctica. Shackleton then led a crew of five aboard the James Caird, the best surviving open boat, through the Drake Passage, even though there were no sun appearances for precise navigation. Through the dead-reckoning skills of Shackleton and his navigator, Frank Worsley, the bedraggled party reached South Georgia Island 650 nautical miles away, their boat barely making landfall in a sinking condition. Shackleton then led two of those men on the first successful overland crossing of South Georgia. Three months later, he was finally able to rescue the remaining crew members they had left behind on Elephant Island.

== Development ==
Virtually every diary kept during the expedition was made available to the author, and almost all the surviving members at the time of writing submitted to lengthy interviews. The most significant contribution came from Dr. Alexander Macklin, one of the ship's surgeons, who provided Lansing with many diaries, a detailed account of the perilous journey the crew made to Elephant Island, and months of advice.

== Publication history ==
- Lansing, Alfred. (1999) 2nd ed. Endurance: Shackleton's Incredible Voyage. Carroll & Graf Publishers. ISBN 0-7867-0621-X

== Accuracy ==
The carpenter, Harry McNish, was a crucial part of the expedition and a member of the six men crew that sailed to South Georgia for help. Lansing consistently calls him “old McNish”, giving his age at the start of the expedition, in 1914, to be 56 years. Some months later it is informed to be 57. Lansing also states that McNish was more than twice the average age of the rest of the crew. However, McNish was 40 years old when the expedition started. Five of the Personnel of the Imperial Trans-Antarctic Expedition were older, including Shackleton. The average age was 31.

== In popular culture ==
- In the TV series NCIS, the main character, Gibbs, is seen reading Endurance in Season 9 Episode 5 "Safe Harbor".
- In the TV series "Atypical", the main character Sam Gardner is an 18-year-old on the autism spectrum with a special interest in Antarctica. Gardner frequently references Shackleton's arctic voyage as a parallel to his own challenges trying to understand and adapt to adulthood.

== See also ==
- South
- The Pale Beyond, a video game that used Endurance as inspiration
