= List of fictional bats =

This is a list of fictional bats that appear in video games, film, television, animation, comics and literature. This list is subsidiary to the list of fictional animals.

Since bats are mammals, yet can fly, they are considered to be liminal beings in various traditions. In many cultures, including in Europe, bats are associated with darkness, death, witchcraft, and malevolence. Among Native Americans such as the Creek, Cherokee and Apache, the bat is identified as a trickster. In Tanzania, a winged batlike creature known as Popobawa is believed to be a shapeshifting evil spirit that assaults and sodomises its victims. In Aztec mythology, bats symbolised the land of the dead, destruction, and decay. An East Nigerian tale tells that the bat developed its nocturnal habits after causing the death of his partner, the bush rat, and now hides by day to avoid arrest.

More positive depictions of bats exist in some cultures. In China, bats have been associated with happiness, joy and good fortune. Five bats are used to symbolise the "Five Blessings": longevity, wealth, health, love of virtue and peaceful death. The bat is sacred in Tonga and is often considered the physical manifestation of a separable soul. In the Zapotec civilization of Mesoamerica, the bat god presided over corn and fertility.

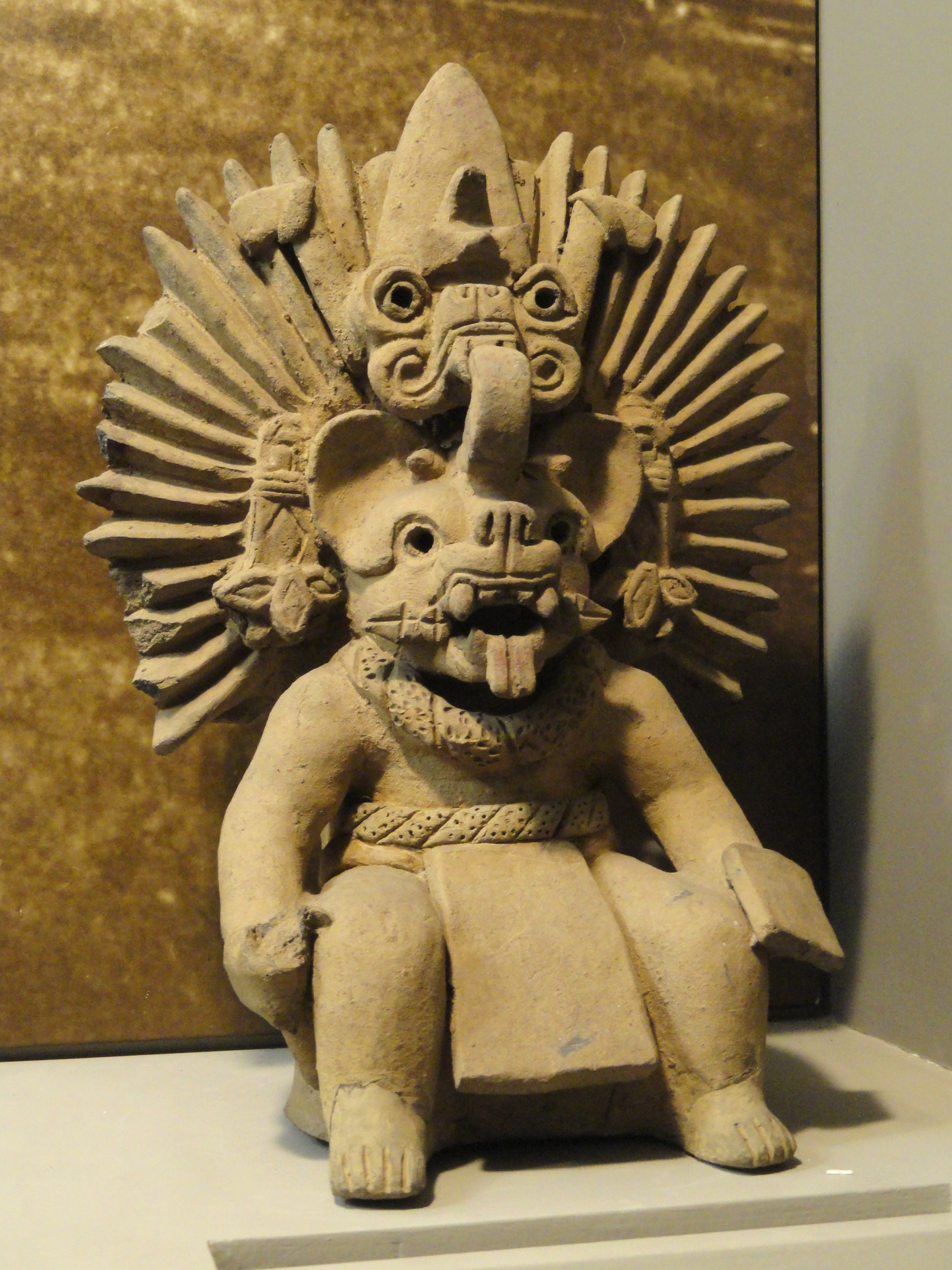
Zapotec bat god, Oaxaca, 350–500 CE

The Weird Sisters in Shakespeare's Macbeth used the fur of a bat in their brew. In Western culture, the bat is often a symbol of the night and its foreboding nature. The bat is a primary animal associated with fictional characters of the night, both villainous vampires, such as Count Dracula and before him Varney the Vampire, and heroes, such as the DC Comics character Batman. Kenneth Oppel's Silverwing novels narrate the adventures of a young bat, based on the silver-haired bat of North America.

== Animation ==
- Bartok, Rasputin's bat henchman from the musical Anastasia and a direct-to-video spinoff Bartok the Magnificent
- Bat-Bat, superhero bat parody of Batman, from Mighty Mouse: The New Adventures
- Batfink, a superhero bat with steel wings from the show, Batfink
- Batty Koda, a fruit bat voiced by Robin Williams from FernGully: The Last Rainforest
- Bertie the bat, a bat who helps his friends to save the environment in the namesake series narrated by Bernard Cribbins
- Dingbat, The 3 Stooges pet in the first episode of The New Scooby Doo Movies
- Fidget, the peg-legged bat with a crippled wing, from The Great Mouse Detective
- Foxglove, a pink bat from Chip 'n Dale: Rescue Rangers
- Fu-Fu, a bat in Sagwa, the Chinese Siamese Cat
- Fangs, Lucy Loud's pet bat in The Loud House
- Sen, a bat in Shoulder-a-Coffin Kuro
- Batso, the morally grey sidekick to Scowl the Owl in Happily Ever After

== Puppetry ==
- Batly, a bat from Eureeka's Castle
- Benny, a bat who appeared in Bear in the Big Blue House, recycled by Leah the Fruit Bat from Jim Henson's Animal Show
- Elmo Bat, a bat variation of Elmo imagined by Dorothy in the Elmo's World episode "Sleep"
- Rosita, a fruit bat monster on Sesame Street
- Stupid Bat, Witchiepoo's dim-witted assistant, from H.R. Pufnstuf

== Comics and manga ==
- Bewitched, Bothered and Bemildred, three bats in Walt Kelly's Pogo
- Yami-Maru, in Millennium Snow
- Billy Bat, the main character in the Billy Bat series

== Anime ==
- Alan, bat from Aikatsu! 3
- Babbit, a bat-like from Kodocha
- Bolas, an anthropomorphic bat from Sacrificial Princess and the King of Beasts
- Chichon, in 801 T.T.S. Airbats
- Common Vampire Bat, from Kemono Friends
- Desert Bat, in Blade of the Phantom Master
- Koumori, from Working Buddies!
- Taigokumaru, a bat-like from Inuyasha
- Yasu, a bat from Don Dracula

== Video games ==
- The Friends Brown Long-Eared Bat, Common Vampire Bat, Daito Fruit Bat, Egyptian Rousette, Fraternal Myotis, Hilgendorf's Tube-Nosed Bat, and Honduran White Bat who appear in multiple Kemono Friends media.

- Dawn, a bat NPC who runs a newspaper stand in Beacon Pines
- Maria Notte, a bat news reporter in Freedom Planet 2
- Pippit, an anthropomorphic bat and the player character in Pipistrello and the Cursed Yoyo
- Zubat, Golbat, Crobat, Gligar, Gliscor, Woobat, Swoobat, Noibat, Noivern and Lunala from Pokémon are all based on bats.
- Rouge, an anthropomorphic bat in the Sonic the Hedgehog series
- Gigadesmodus, a huge wyvern-like bat ridden by the Lost King in the ARK: Survival Ascended Lost Colony DLC

== Literature ==
- Shade, Marina and Goth, from the Silverwing novels and animated adaptation
- Stellaluna, a fruit bat in Janell Cannon's book of the same name.
- From Ursula Vernon's novel Castle Hangnail, the Eldest, leader of the bat colony in the castle belfry, and Bugbane, a bat who prefers a diurnal schedule.

== See also ==
- Vampires in popular culture, noting that vampires are often associated with a power to transform into bats
