= Thomas Hislop =

Thomas Hislop may refer to:

- Sir Thomas Hislop, 1st Baronet (1764–1843), British Army general
- Thomas William Hislop (1850–1925), mayor of Wellington, New Zealand
- Thomas Hislop (mayor) (1888–1965), son of Thomas William Hislop, also mayor of Wellington, New Zealand
- Tom Hislop (born 1988), Australian rules footballer
- Thomas Hislop (born 1994), Northern Irish video game developer
