= Umurangi Generation =

2020 video game

- Developer: Origame Digital
- Publishers: Origame Digital; Playism
- Director: Tali Faulkner
- Composer: ThorHighHeels
- Engine: Unity
- Platforms: Windows; Nintendo Switch; Xbox One; PlayStation 4; PlayStation 5; Quest 2; Quest 3
- Release: Windows; 19 May 2020; Switch; 5 June 2021; Xbox One; 17 May 2022; PS4, PS5, Quest 2, Quest 3; 18 April 2024
- Genre: Photography
- Mode: Single-player

Umurangi Generation is a first-person photography simulation video game developed by Origame Digital and released for Microsoft Windows in May 2020. Ports for Nintendo Switch and Xbox One followed in June 2021 and May 2022, respectively. Versions for PlayStation 4 and PlayStation 5 released in April 2024, alongside a virtual reality version for the PlayStation VR2 and Meta Quest platforms.

== Gameplay ==
Umurangi Generation is a first-person photography game. The player is tasked with taking photos meeting specific conditions (such as photographing a particular piece of graffiti with a specific camera lens) but is otherwise free to exercise their creativity. The game allows the player multiple methods, techniques and opportunities for achieving their photography bounties, as well as complete freedom over any editing or effects put on photos. The player unlocks camera and lens attachments to achieve different effects, such as telephoto and fisheye lenses.

== Plot ==
Umurangi Generation takes place in Tauranga, New Zealand, in the near future during a time of crisis. The player takes the role of a Māori courier for the Tauranga Express. The United Nations has deployed soldiers and towering mecha to defend the island nation against alien invaders which resemble bluebottle jellyfish. The player travels around settings such as a rooftop party, a military checkpoint, a battle and an evacuation train to take pictures along with their friends, Micah, Atarau, Kete, and a chinstrap penguin named Pengi.

In-game advertisements and images provide further context, such as local resistance against the UN occupation, the prime minister being away on holiday during the crisis, and a dangerous contagious parasite epidemic. The player is punished for taking pictures of jellyfish but is otherwise free to roam and photograph.

The game ends with a cataclysmic scene of a shadowy creature perched over a mountain as the player walks towards a beach where several spirits of Māori people, mud crabs and Huia overlook the catastrophe. The game ends dedicating itself to the "Umurangi Generation: The last generation who has to watch the world die."

== Development and release ==
Umurangi Generation was developed by a Māori developer, Naphtali Faulkner. Faulkner developed the game in Unity in 10 months, starting full-time work on the project at the start of 2020. Before development, Faulkner worked on community apps with local Aboriginal groups, and would dabble in smaller projects in his free time. Faulkner says that Umurangi Generation is the first "real" game he's made.

Faulkner was inspired to make the game's photography system after teaching their younger cousin how to use a DSLR camera, and noting that explaining it to him felt like a video game tutorial. The gameplay was also inspired by the item management of the Arma series noting that the loadouts for characters in Arma felt like accessories that the player gets to play with minute to minute.

The concept of the game's world and themes stemmed from the Australian government's response to the 2020 bushfires, as well as the COVID-19 pandemic, and Faulkner's frustration at both crises being mishandled, despite the knowledge that the government had about climate change and virus control. Faulker views the game as a criticism of neoliberalism, stating that the goal of the political system is to comfort people in the face of elements that serve to harm them.

Faulkner's inspiration for the game's philosophy came from his history with Respectful Design, a design philosophy with an emphasis on decolonization of art. Faulkner is a member of the Ngāi Te Rangi iwi of New Zealand, and Māori culture can be seen throughout the game. "Umurangi" is Te Reo for "Red Sky," and feathers of the Huia, a traditional bird used in Māori ritual that was hunted to extinction, appear throughout the game.

Further inspiration for the setting and visual style included Neon Genesis Evangelion, Jet Set Radio, Shin Godzilla, and the designs of Yoji Shinkawa. Cyberpunk themes were also influential, but Faulkner became frustrated with the aesthetic refusing to evolve and continuing to be a reflection of the 1980s, when the genre had first developed. Faulkner's goal was to have Umurangi Generation be a reflection of the modern era, and has opted to use the term "shitty future" to categorize the game.

Umurangi Generation was published by Playism, a subsidiary of Active Gaming Media. It was released for PC on 19 May 2020. A set of DLC levels titled Umurangi Generation Macro was released on 7 November 2020. A Nintendo Switch port including the Macro DLC subtitled Special Edition was released on 5 June 2021. This version was later ported to Xbox One on 17 May 2022. Versions for PlayStation 4 and PlayStation 5 released on 18 April 2024, alongside a VR version of the game for PlayStation VR2 and Meta Quest devices.

=== Umurangi Generation Macro ===
A DLC titled Umurangi Generation Macro was released on 7 November 2020. It adds four new levels and new camera systems, such as shutter speed, apertures and ISO adjustments, as well as a selfie camera and an attachment stylized after the Game Boy Camera that produces low resolution photos. Roller skates were also added, enabling the player to traverse around the world more quickly, as well as a spray can for the player to paint objects in the world.

== Reception ==
Reception

Aggregate scores
Aggregator	Score
Metacritic	PC: 84/100; NS: 83/100
OpenCritic	88% recommend

Review scores
Publication	Score
Destructoid	9.5/10
Eurogamer	Recommended
GameSpot	9/10
Nintendo World Report	7.5/10
The Guardian	5/5
TouchArcade	4/5

Umurangi Generation received "generally favorable reviews" according to review aggregator Metacritic. Fellow review aggregator OpenCritic assessed that the game received strong approval, being recommended by 88% of critics.

Khee Hoon Chan gave the game a 9/10 for GameSpot, and praised its beautiful environments and engaging photography mechanic, as well as its biting social commentary that served to reinvigorate the ideas behind cyberpunk from a new perspective.

Mikhail Klimentov writing for The Washington Post also noted the game's unambiguous and sincere storytelling, and how the game forced the player to confront the realities of the fictional universe in-game as well as our own world, by exploring to document it.

The game won the Seumas McNally Grand Prize and the Excellence in Narrative awards at the Independent Games Festival Awards, whereas its other nomination was for the Nuovo Award.

== See also ==
- Penguin Colony, a 2026 video game by the same developer
