= Trobbiani =

Trobbiani is an Italian surname. Notable people with the surname include:

- Marcelo Trobbiani (born 1955), Argentine footballer and manager
- Matt Trobbiani, Australian video game developer
- Pablo Trobbiani (born 1976), Argentine footballer and manager
