= No Longer Home =

2021 video game

- Developer: Humble Grove Studios
- Publisher: Fellow Traveller
- Composer: Eli Rainsberry
- Platforms: Linux; macOS; Microsoft Windows; Nintendo Switch; Xbox One; Xbox Series X/S; PlayStation 4; PlayStation 5
- Release: Linux, macOS, Windows; 30 July 2021; Switch, Xbox One, Xbox Series X/S; 7 October 2021; PlayStation 4, PlayStation 5; 3 March 2023
- Genre: Indie point-and-click adventure game

No Longer Home is a point-and-click adventure game developed by Humble Grove Studios and distributed by Fellow Traveller. The game was released in 2021 for the PC, Nintendo Switch Xbox One, and the Xbox Series platforms. It was also ported to PlayStation 4 and PlayStation 5 in 2023. It received mixed reviews on the Metacritic aggregator for the PC and Switch platforms. No Longer Home was nominated on The Game Awards 2021 in the games for impact category.

The game takes place in an apartment flat that was owned by two non-binary university students named Ao and Bo. Now that they are graduating and must acknowledge to their inevitable fate of going down their separate paths of goodbye, something magical starts to emerge. The story also includes their friends and their newest flatmate, Lu. There is a website dedicated to sharing information about the game.
