= Citizen Sleeper 2: Starward Vector =

2025 video game

- Developer: Jump Over the Age
- Publisher: Fellow Traveller
- Designer: Gareth Damian Martin
- Artist: Guillaume Singelin
- Writer: Gareth Damian Martin
- Composer: Amos Roddy
- Engine: Unity
- Platforms: Windows; macOS; Nintendo Switch; Xbox Series X/S; PlayStation 5; Nintendo Switch 2
- Release: 31 January 2025
- Genre: Role-playing
- Mode: Single-player

Citizen Sleeper 2: Starward Vector is a 2025 role-playing video game developed by Jump Over the Age and published by Fellow Traveller. A sequel to Citizen Sleeper (2022), the game was released on 31 January 2025, for Windows PC, macOS, Nintendo Switch, PlayStation 5, and Xbox Series X and Series S. A Nintendo Switch 2 version was released on 25 June 2026.

== Plot ==
Continuing from the events of the first game, the sequel is set in the asteroid belt of the Helion System known as the Starward Vector, where a corporate war is brewing between multiple different interstellar corporations for control of the star system. The player takes control of a Sleeper, who is awoken with no past memories after attempting to reboot their system to escape the control of a gang who forced them to work in exchange for medicine they need to survive. The Sleeper must rely on their luck in order to escape and build a future where they can live freely.

== Gameplay ==
Gameplay screenshot of a ship being dismantled for scrap

In Citizen Sleeper 2, the player assumes control of a "Sleeper", a digitized human mind housed within a robotic body. Unlike the first game, which is set in a single location, Starward Vector is set in an asteroid belt known as the Starward Belt, and the player can explore multiple hub locations. The Sleeper can commandeer a spaceship, complete missions and contracts, and recruit crew members. As players progress, they will have to make various decisions that will change the game's overall narrative.

As with its predecessor, the player rolls a number of dice each in-game day, or "cycle". These dice are then placed into different tasks and interactions with other characters, where higher numbers generally indicate better outcomes. Crew members also have their own die, and have an ability named "Push" that can provide an additional boost, though doing so will cause the crew to accumulate Stress; high stress will damage a player's dice. If a dice is damaged three times, they can no longer be used until they are repaired. If the player stress level is full, they may gain a "glitch dice", which has an 80% chance of delivering negative outcomes, and a 20% chance of delivering the best possible outcome in a given situation. Players can choose from three different classes for their Sleeper: Operator, Extractor, and Machinist. Operators are more skilled in computers, hacking systems, and making strategic decisions, but are the most vulnerable to Stress. Extractors have a higher tolerance for Stress but lack in intuition, making decision-making more difficult. Machinists specialize in making repairs and modifications, but lack communication skills with crew members.

== Development ==
Solo developer Gareth Damian Martin returned as the game's director; Guillaume Singelin and Amos Roddy also returned as the game's character art designer and composer respectively. According to Damian Martin, they wanted to use the sequel to introduce more mechanics commonly found in tabletop role-playing games (TTRPG), citing Blades in the Dark, Mothership, and Heart: The City Beneath as their sources of inspiration. It was also mechanically more complicated than the first game, as Damian Martin was frustrated that some players labelled the first game as a visual novel rather than a role-playing game. While Damian Martin did not immediately create a sequel to Citizen Sleeper following its release, the original game's success prompted them to create downloadable content packs for it. Following a year of experimentation, they felt that a new game in the series with a distinct framework was necessary. Therefore, Starward Vector was "designed to be different" from its predecessor since its inception. Damian Martin dedicated Citizen Sleeper's successor to Jed Gillamac, a voice actor who was known to voice Citizen Sleeper 2's character Serafin in the trailers advertising the game. He died after voicing the second trailer.

Contracts were designed for worldbuilding, and they were inspired by "side episodes of a TV show" such as Firefly, Cowboy Bepop, and Farscape. The narrative mainly focused on a "ragtag group of people on a ship", "where people are not necessarily all each other's best friends and there's tension between them". While the game introduced crew members who can complete missions together with the player character, some of them were not intended to be permanent companions, and will only join the player for a brief period. Mass Effect 2 was described by Damian Martin as the "anti-reference" for the game, as Starward Vector's narrative focused more on morally grey ethical choices, and did not position the player character as the chosen one archetype. The main theme of the game was "crisis", with the player being tasked to navigate various challenges. The player character is caught in a system-wide corporate war, while their malfunctioning body is falling apart. Damian Martin was influenced by real-life events such as the COVID-19 pandemic and Russian invasion of Ukraine in 2022, as well as their own medical struggles, while creating the game's story. The game's stress system was a mechanic Damian Martin included that was based on tabletop game's "push your luck" system.

Starward Vector was announced in June 2023. Damian Martin released monthly text logs named "Helion Dispatches" to bridge the gap between the first game and the sequel. The game was envisioned as the last video game in the series, though Damian Martin planned to release a full TTRPG set in the Citizen Sleeper universe in the future.

== Reception ==
Reception

Aggregate score
Aggregator	Score
Metacritic	(PC) 86/100 (PS5) 90/100 (XSXS) 85/100

Review scores
Publication	Score
Eurogamer	5/5
Game Informer	9.5/10
GamesRadar+	4/5
IGN	8/10
PC Gamer (US)	80/100
VG247	5/5

Citizen Sleeper 2: Starward Vector received "critical acclaim" for the PlayStation 5 version while the Windows and Xbox Series X/S version received "generally favorable" reviews, according to review aggregator website Metacritic.

Writing for Eurogamer, Robert Purchese wrote that Starward Vector "improved the RPG formula in every way". He praised the newly introduced mechanics for making the experience tense and frequently putting them in precarious situations. Jay Peters from The Verge wrote that the game can be anxiety-inducing due to the presence of a consistent threat, and added that "tension is what makes the game compelling", as players often had to pick the best choice from several bad options. Rollin Bishop from GamesRadar wrote that the game was "largely rooted in modern tabletop narrative design", though he felt that many of the outcomes were already predetermined by the game, meaning that players lacked the opportunity to improvise. Harvey Randall from PC Gamer described the game as an ambitious sequel with a larger scope when compared with its predecessor, he felt that some of the mechanics in the game did not mesh well with the game's narrative structure. Jarrett Green from IGN felt that the experience was more engaging when compared with its first game due to the revamped survival systems, though he remarked that the game can be "slow paced, repetitive, and full of walls of text" due to its TTRPG-like design.

Purchese also strongly praised the writing, and the characters of the game, adding that the "heartfelt moments" people found in the original game remained intact in the sequel. Rachel Watts from VG247 also liked the story, and added that players can "always rely on something wild happening" regardless of their choices. Despite this, she wrote that events in the game were underpinned by "poignant human drama" and grounded characters dealing with everyday struggles. Randall added that the game was filled with "charming characters, excellent knife-twists to the heart, and fascinating worldbuilding". While he praised the characters for their "complex motivations and flawless characterisation", he felt that they were often reduced to "meatshields and dice vendors" during missions, and he was disappointed of the lack of "real, proper friction" between the player character and the companions. Green also praised the game's writing, adding that it excelled at "creating dense webs of philosophical and existential conflict", though he found some of the characters in the game to be uninspired.

=== Awards ===
Year	Award	Category	Result	Ref.
2025	Golden Joystick Awards	Best Indie Game	Nominated	
2025	Code The Rights (Note: A recent award created by Amnesty International)	Best Game	Won	
2025	The Indie Game Awards	Game Of The Year	Nominated	
2025	The Indie Game Awards	Best Narrative	Won	
2025	National Academy of Video Game Trade Reviewers	Outstanding Special Class Game	Pending	
2026	29th Annual D.I.C.E. Awards	Role-Playing Game of the Year	Nominated	
2026	22nd British Academy Games Awards	British Game	Nominated	
2026	22nd British Academy Games Awards	Game Beyond Entertainment	Nominated	
