= Carroll & Graf Publishers =

American publishing company (1982–2007)

- Status: Defunct
- Founded: 1982 (43 years ago)
- Founder: Kent Carroll; Herman Graf
- Defunct: 2007
- Successor: Perseus Books Group
- Country of origin: United States
- Headquarters location: New York City, New York

Carroll & Graf Publishers was an American publishing company based in New York City, New York that published a wide range of fiction and non-fiction by both new and established authors, as well as reprinted previously hard-to-find works. It closed in 2007.

== History ==
Publisher Kent Carroll, the editorial director of Grove Press from 1975 to 1981, co-founded Carroll & Graf in 1982 with Herman Graf, who was executive vice president of Grove Press. Headquartered on West 17th Street in New York City, it offered a variety of fiction and non-fiction, including history, biography, current affairs, mysteries (including British imports) and science fiction.

By 1995 Carroll & Graf was releasing 125 titles of fiction and non-fiction annually, by authors ranging from Anthony Burgess, Beryl Bainbridge, and Penelope Fitzgerald to Philip K. Dick and Eric Ambler. Best Evidence, which spent three months on the NY Times best seller list (Jan - March, 1981), was published by Carroll and Graf, in trade paperback format in 1988. A non-fiction best-seller, Crossfire: The Plot That Killed Kennedy, was transformed by Oliver Stone into the movie JFK.

Carroll & Graf was purchased by the Avalon Publishing Group in 1998, and in 2003 Will Balliett became its publisher. Avalon was purchased by the Perseus Books Group in January 2007. That May, Perseus president David Steinberger announced that Carroll & Graf would be shut down.

== Authors and editors ==
Notable authors included:

- Brian Aldiss
- Eric Ambler
- Diana Athill
- Beryl Bainbridge
- J.G. Ballard
- Sybille Bedford
- David Benioff
- Georges Bernanos
- Lesley Blanch
- Anthony Burgess
- Apsley Cherry-Garrard
- Lady Diana Cooper
- Philip K. Dick
- J. G. Farrell
- Penelope Fitzgerald
- George MacDonald Fraser
- Mavis Gallant
- Jane Gardam
- Erle Stanley Gardner
- Michael Gilbert
- Knut Hamsun
- Dorothy B. Hughes
- Henry James
- Alfred Lansing
- Thomas Ligotti
- Norman Mailer
- Jim Marrs
- Joseph McElroy
- Henry Miller
- John O'Hara
- Nicholas Proffitt
- James Sallis
- Michael Shaara
- Gilbert Sorrentino
- Jared Taylor
- Peter Taylor
- D.M. Thomas
- Auberon Waugh

Carroll & Graf editor-in-chief Philip Turner departed in 2006 and was replaced by Bill Strachan, who began a career in the business 35 years earlier as an Anchor Books editorial secretary, rising through the ranks at Viking Press, Houghton Mifflin and Henry Holt to Columbia University Press.
