= Gareth Damian Martin =

British video game developer

- Born: 1987 (age 38–39)
- Citizenship: United Kingdom
- Occupation: Video game developer
- Years active: 2020-present
- Notable work: In Other Waters, Citizen Sleeper, Citizen Sleeper 2: Starward Vector
- Website: https://jumpovertheage.com/

Gareth Damian Martin (Note: Contrary to a common misconception, their last name is Damian Martin and they do not publicly use their middle name.) is a British indie video game developer, writer and artist known for their games In Other Waters, Citizen Sleeper and Citizen Sleeper 2: Starward Vector, all released under the single-person studio Jump Over The Age.

== Early life and education ==
According to their personal biography, Damian Martin is the holder of a PhD in experimental literature from Royal Holloway, University of London.

== Career ==
=== Early career ===
From 2016 to 2019, Damian Martin contributed features to Eurogamer, Rock Paper Shotgun and Frieze Magazine. They are the creator and editor of Heterotopias, an independent zine about architecture in video games published on itch.io.

They worked at 59 Studio as an animator and visual designer and taught at the Bartlett School of Architecture.

=== Jump Over The Age ===
In 2018, Damian Martin founded the independent game development studio Jump Over The Age. Their first game, In Other Waters, was released in 2020 and marked the debut of Damian's collaboration with composer and sound designer Amos Roddy. It was followed by Citizen Sleeper in 2022 and its sequel Citizen Sleeper 2: Starward Vector in 2025. For Citizen Sleeper 2: Starward Vector, Damian Martin expanded the original game's single-station setting into a wider region known as the Belt. The sequel introduced a recruitable crew, timed contracts and a stress system through which the player's dice could become damaged or permanently impaired. They retained the series' emphasis on narrative choices and the use of dice as representations of a character's available actions.

Following the success of Citizen Sleeper, Damian Martin collaborated with TTRPG designer Alfred Valley to create Cycles of the Eye, a tabletop sequel to Citizen Sleeper.

In June 2026, Damian Martin announced Signet City, "a first person fungalpunk RPG" in which the player is set to control a parasitic fungus and its hosts in a costal city at a juncture due to issues of leadership, technology and environmental collapse. It is a long-time project of Damian Martin whose concept predates In Other Waters, and draws inspiration from Dishonored, post-punk, 1980s Britain and weird fiction. The reveal trailer for Signet City features the song "Abandon" by Irish post-punk band SPRINTS.

=== Reception ===
David Wildgoose of GameSpot described Damian Martin's writing for In Other Waters as "excellent [and] concise". Eurogamer ranked Citizen Sleeper 5th out of its 37 best games of 2022, describing Damian Martin as "one of the most exciting indie talents around". Wesley LeBlanc of Game Informer praised their writing for Citizen Sleeper: Starward Vector as "incredible sci-fi writing". The Magic Rain described Damian Martin's storytelling as "deeply human".

== Personal life ==
Damian Martin is non-binary and uses they/them pronouns.
