= Jodee Blanco =

American author and lecturer

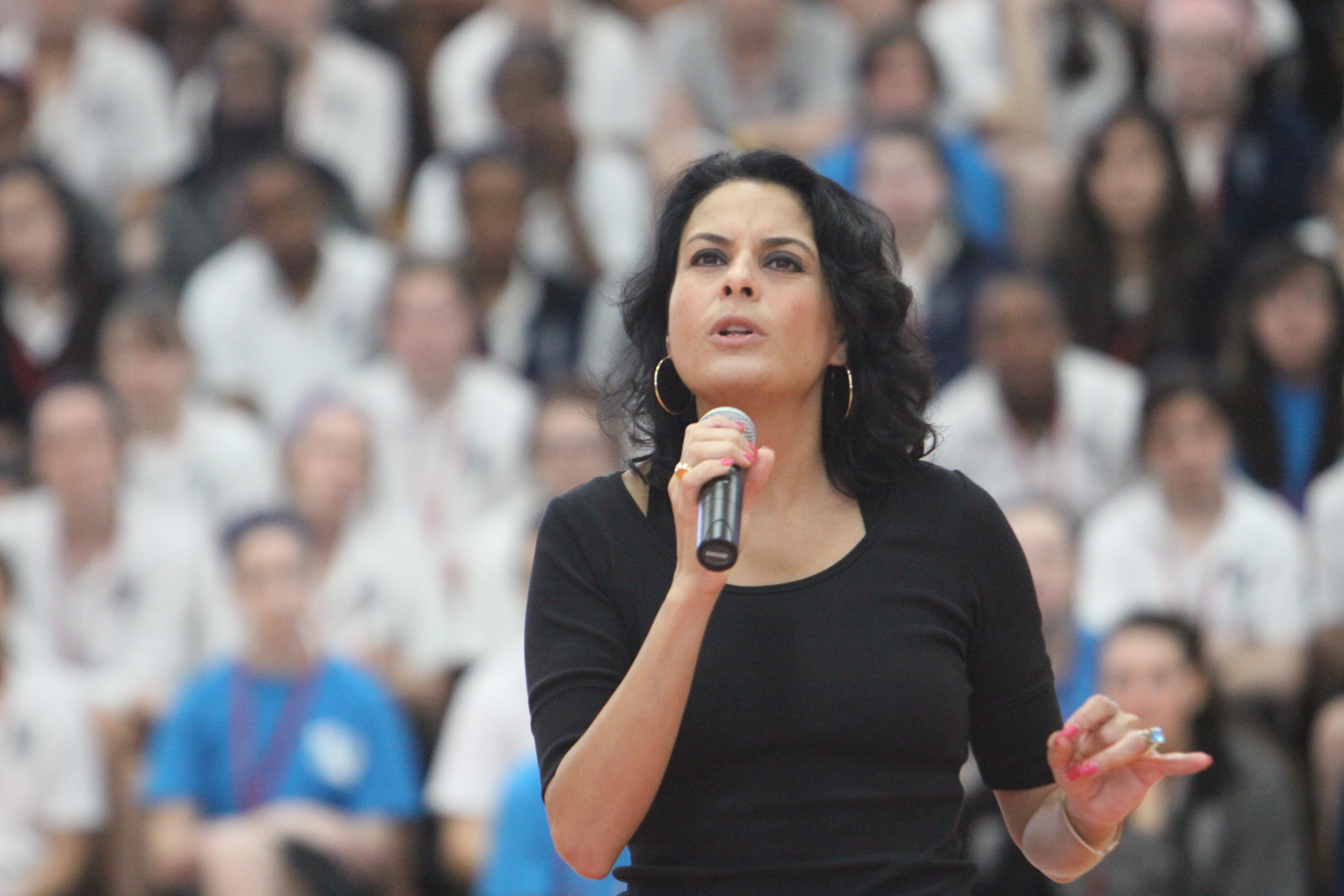
- Jodee Blanco is shown speaking at a Chicago area high school in 2021
- Born: 19 March 1964 (age 62)
- Education: New York University (B.A.)
- Occupations: Author, lecturer
- Website: www.jodeeblanco.com

Jodee Blanco (born March 19, 1964) is an American author and lecturer. She is the author of Please Stop Laughing at Me . . . One Woman's Inspirational Story, a New York Times best selling memoir that led to her becoming an anti-bullying crusader. She was an adjunct faculty member at the Center for Publishing at New York University.

== Early life and education ==
Born in Chicago, Illinois, Blanco was raised in Evergreen Park, and Palos Park, Illinois. She attended Carl Sandburg High School in Orland Park, Illinois and The American Community School in Halandri, Greece.

Blanco completed an associate's degree from The School of Continuing Education at New York University in 1984 and a Bachelor of Arts in Journalism from New York University's Washington Square School of Arts & Sciences in 1986.

== Career ==
From 1986 to 1991, Blanco was senior publicist for Diane Glynn Publicity, Inc. in New York City. In 1992, she founded Blanco & Peace, Ltd. with publicist Lissy Peace, where she created multi-media campaigns for celebrities, corporations, production companies and publishers. Among the individuals and entities that she's worked with include Mickey Rooney, Steve Allen, Oleg Cassini, Universal Studios, Warner Books, among others.

From 2000 to 2003 Blanco was an adjunct faculty member at New York University's Center for Publishing, teaching courses on literary publicity and communications. In 2001–2003, she taught communications and public relations at the Graham School at the University of Chicago.

In 2000, Blanco co-authored (with Catherine Lanigan) The Evolving Woman (Health Communications Inc.), a non-fiction work focusing on domestic violence. The book received the Celebration of Hope Award from then-senator Joe Biden. In 2003, her memoir Please Stop Laughing at Me . . . One Woman's Inspirational Story (Simon & Schuster) became a New York Times bestseller. The book established her as an early voice of the anti-bullying movement and gave rise to her lecture series aimed at reducing bullying in American schools.

Blanco has delivered her lecture series, It's NOT Just Joking Around!™ (INJJA), to students, teachers and parents in schools across the United States. She is the author of eight books and co-author of three. Her work has been featured on CBS, CNN, The New York Times and other notable media.

== See also ==
- Kent Carroll
