= Hacknet =

2015 video game

- Developer: Team Fractal Alligator
- Publisher: Fellow Traveller
- Engine: XNA; FNA (Note: The game also supports the FNA Game Engine, and is the default on platforms other than Windows)
- Platforms: Microsoft Windows, macOS, Linux
- Release: Microsoft Windows: WW: August 12, 2015; macOS, Linux: WW: December 18, 2015
- Genre: Simulation
- Mode: Single-player

Hacknet is a 2015 video game developed by Matt Trobbiani that allows the player to perform simulated computer hacking.

== Gameplay ==
The game simulates a Unix-like operating system, with every main element of the game's interface having its own window. Windows are tiled in a fashion highly reminiscent of the i3 window manager. The windows have multiple tiling configurations with their own wallpapers and color schemes, which can be found as files as the game progresses. The main gameplay is done through two large interfaces, a graphical display, and a Unix terminal. Both interfaces are essential for gameplay, though the player can use either as their main interface.

Along with the terminal, the computers in the game simulate a Unix-like file system, through which the player can explore the computer, and even destroy them by deleting critical system files. The core of the gameplay is to connect to other computers and run dedicated programs to break the security and acquire superuser privileges on the computer. The general procedure is to first run a scan to see what protections the computer has and then run programs matching what the scan revealed. Each program takes up a certain amount of memory, which the player has to manage, as there is only a limited amount of memory to share.

The game notably averts the common trope of bouncing a connection between several intermediary computers before reaching the target computer. Instead, a simplified system of a variable speed countdown is used to force the player to act quickly. If this countdown reaches zero, the player is given one last chance to avoid a game over by hacking their ISP and changing their IP address.

Once superuser privileges have been obtained, the file system of the computer is investigated. The exact task on each computer varies for each mission, but can, in general, be performed by running a specific command to access one or more files on the system.

A few systems have specialized interfaces, such as email systems and databases.

Most computer systems contain text files that can be read. A large majority of the files are quotes from the website bash.org.

== Story ==
=== Bit ===
The game begins with the player being automatically contacted by a user by the username "Bit". The automated message tells the player that it was sent in the event of Bit's death and asks that the player investigate his death.

Bit then starts to teach you the game mechanics by way of simple missions. Bit will then inform the player to join the hacktivist group Entropy, as they are currently recruiting members. By locating their proxy server and hacking into it, the player is congratulated by Entropy for being the first person to pass the test. Afterwards, the player proves themselves by shutting down a tabloid server that has taken a negative stance towards Entropy.

After shutting down the server, Entropy accepts the player into their ranks and provides them with several contracts to fulfill, ranging from changing someone's score in a clicker game to deleting stolen files.

=== Naix ===
After completing a few of Entropy's missions, the player is eventually assigned to investigate a hacker by the alias of Naix. Naix recently stole a large amount of data from a company, damaging the hacking community's reputation in the process. After deleting Naix's stolen data, he takes offense to being investigated and attacks the player's system, deleting their interface. This attack can be defended against, albeit requires strict timing by using a trap program. If the attack is successful, it will result in the game interface disappearing and the computer rebooting, leaving the player with a minimal console interface. Once the player has recovered their system from the attack by downloading Naix's system, the player can choose to either take revenge on Naix by counter-deleting his system, or follow the guidance of their mission control and make a statement that such behavior is not acceptable, resulting in the resumption of the player's missions with Entropy.

==== Naix's Tests ====
If the player counter-hacked Naix, he relents, making a truce with the player, and gives them a test by defacing a bloatware antivirus company's homepage. Once successful, the player completes another test by hacking directly into the antivirus company's mainframe. After completing his tests, Naix apologizes, admitting the player's skill and invites them to join a community named /el.

==== /el Message Board ====
The player is whitelisted by Naix, granting access to an anonymous Internet forum. While other members of the forum are stumped by a series of trials set up by a group named the Polar Star, the player completes the tests and is rewarded with a new hacking program. After that, a member of /el challenges the community to hack into an always-online hard drive connected to the internet to be used as a server. If the community cannot crack it, the member will consider them failures and begin to use the hard drive. Undeterred, the player hacks into the server and deletes a file set up by the member, passing the test.

=== CSEC ===
If the player didn't hack Naix and only reported back to Entropy, they are invited to another organization called CSEC, going through an automated test. If the player hacked Naix, proved their skill, and completed /el's missions, the Polar Star directly recommends them to a CSEC admin named Vap0r, skipping the automated trials altogether. Either way, the player is assigned to break into a fried chicken chain's servers and steal the recipe. After uploading the recipe to a drop server, the player is given an account to CSEC's contract hub, allowing them to accept and fulfill various contracts. While downloading several program's from CSEC's assets server, the player downloads a seemingly useless program named Sequencer.

==== Project Junebug ====
One late-game contract in the game is called "Project Junebug". While the player can see it right after joining CSEC, the mission will remain locked until all other CSEC missions have been taken care of. The mission is a request to provide euthanasia for someone terminally ill by hacking their pacemaker and shutting it off.

=== Finale ===
As the final story arc of the game, the player is contacted directly by Vap0r revealing herself to be an old friend of Bit. Vap0r works with the player to break into the computers of a computer security software company named EnTech. As the pair do so, they are faced with a security system that makes computers invulnerable to the tools currently at the disposal of the player. While the player manages to find alternative ways into the protected systems, they discover that Bit was involved in a project for the company; specifically, the creation of a highly advanced operating system specialized in computer hacking named HackNet. It is revealed that the plan for the project is to unleash HackNet to the world in order to cause consumer demand for a protection system EnTech developed, which is the only software that can protect against it.

Bit in particular was a major contributor. As the project was nearing its completion, Bit began to question the morality of the project and wanted to delete it. The EnTech CEO requested a hitman to "discourage him", but due to miscommunication, this led to Bit being assassinated. Although the CEO only wanted to intimidate Bit into silence and destroy his computers, he is killed before the CEO can call off the hitman.

Once all the facts of the story have been revealed to the player, they are contacted by Vap0r, who has been preparing to launch an attack on EnTech and requires the player's assistance. The player activates Sequencer, which turns out to be a modified music sequencer program. By activating it, the program signals Vap0r to connect the player to EnTech's backup archive by forcing it to run an online update check, performing a simultaneous takedown of the production server and the backup server with the player's help and proceeding to eradicate all copies of the HackNet project.

Additionally, by command of Bit himself, they bring down the server at the heart of Porthack, the tool that Bit made. Once this final mission is completed, Bit delivers some final voice-acted words, explaining that the player now has the only remaining copy of HackNet before the game credits roll.

== Labyrinths ==
A DLC expansion for Hacknet, titled Hacknet Labyrinths was announced on August 30, 2016. The expansion was set to come out December 2016; however, development issues delayed release to March 31, 2017.

The expansion features new hacking tools and security systems, as well as a 3- to 4-hour chapter to the game. It includes more secrets, more UI themes and a full new soundtrack, from artists such as synthwave artist OGRE and Rémi Gallego, creator of metal/electronic act The Algorithm.

=== Story ===
A mysterious individual named Kaguya begins recruiting several individuals, including the player. After passing Kaguya's trials, the player has their Hacknet UI wiped, joins a hub server named Bibliotheque, and is introduced to two other skilled hackers, Coel and D3f4ult. Kaguya explains to the team that they have recruited them for a mysterious job, but first assigns them to steal several programs in preparation for the task. While the player, Coel, and D3f4ult break into several servers and steal programs, Kaguya works on securing software, intel, and contacts for the upcoming job.

After stealing several programs, the player and D3f4ult break into an MMO to change a user's points as a test, as Kaguya needs to prove the team is good enough for them to get some intel. While the two break into the MMO, Kaguya and Coel work on a confidential mission mentioning "Nisei MK III", something that has been discussed between the two since the beginning of the DLC.

Kaguya assigns all team members to gain access to the booking mainframe of an airline company named PacificAir, utilizing all the tools and programs they stole. The team eventually manages to hack into the mainframe and each member is given a final task. The player, having gained access to the mainframe server first, is instructed to install a backdoor as a "backup plan". D3f4ult works with Kaguya to analyze the security protocols and find a way through for the team, and Coel's mission is sparse of details, only telling her "you know the stakes."

After all members complete their respective tasks, Kaguya explains their plan. With Coel, the two have been sabotaging a chemical weapon research — Nisei MK III — and they have deleted all digital backups. However, a hardcopy of the data exists in a PacificAir plane, PA_0022, which Kaguya wants crashed to prevent the weaponization of the data. PA_0018, a second flight, contains the research's reports.

While Kaguya and Coel argue about the morality of the situation, D3f4ult suddenly accepts the mission, catching everyone off-guard, and attempts to crash the PA-0018 by deleting the plane's firmware. However, Coel goes rogue, activating a backdoor program which bans Kaguya and D3f4ult from Bibliotheque. She asks the player to save the plane while she holds D3f4ult and Kaguya off to stop them from reconnecting. At this point, the player can decide whether to crash the plane Kaguya asked them to, crash both planes, or save them.

==== Save Ending ====
By downloading the second plane's firmware, reinstalling it in the first plane, and rebooting the controls, the player is able to save PA_0022 and its passengers. Coel thanks the player for their help, and the two hackers wipe Kaguya and D3f4ult's computers to stop them from attacking the planes again. Coel instructs them to lay low, directing them to a server which will remove Kaguya's trackers and return them to the Hacknet UI — the base game.

==== Crash Ending ====
By doing nothing and waiting for the first plane to crash, Kaguya and D3f4ult are able to rejoin Bibliotheque's group chat as Coel escapes. D3f4ult expresses concern as the second plane with the reports continues flying, but Kaguya reluctantly allows the plane to remain in the air, as they believe the research does not outweigh the loss of life. Kaguya thanks the two and disbands the group, promising to contact D3f4ult and the player after things have cooled down.

==== Double Crash Ending ====
If the player chooses to crash both planes by deleting the second plane's firmware, Kaguya and D3f4ult rejoin. D3f4ult notices the second plane has also gone down while Kaguya tries to reassure themselves and the group that it was the safest option, disbanding the team.

==== Subvert Psylance Investigation ====
If the player has completed the DLC before the end of the main game, the player receives a CSEC contract called Subvert Psylance Investigation, in which they're asked to help the posters' friend, who is being framed for an attack she did not commit. The attack is mentioned as the PA_0022 incident, with the poster asking the player to "COVER TRACKS WELL" and signing off as -K.

During the mission, the player hacks into Psylance Internal Services — the cybersecurity company working for PacificAir — to replace the incident report with the one from CSEC, that references the Nisei MK III project Coel was tracking for Kaguya. This could suggest that the chemical weapon threat was, to an extent, true.

Additionally, by running a decryption program on the file provided by CSEC, the player can see that it was encrypted on Kaguya's computer, making Kaguya or Coel the only people that could have given the mission. Based on the other clues, it is heavily implied the poster is Kaguya.

== Development ==
Hacknet was developed by Matt Trobbiani, the sole developer of Team Fractal Alligator, based in Australia.

== Reception ==
Reception

Aggregate score
Aggregator	Score
Metacritic	82/100

Review score
Publication	Score
GameSpot	8/10

Hacknet received generally positive reviews from critics.

GameSpot gave the game an 8/10, praising the game for its unique presentation puzzle design.

== Extensions ==
In May 2017, official mod support for Hacknet titled Hacknet Extensions was released worldwide, in which players can create their own custom stories and campaigns for the game. These extensions can be shared and downloaded from the Steam Workshop. Extensions are separate from the main game, and are accessed from a separate menu from the title screen.

Hacknet Extensions also features extension-exclusive tools and the ability to implement custom music and themes.
