= Screencheat =

2014 video game

- Developer: Samurai Punk
- Publisher: Surprise Attack
- Engine: Unity
- Platforms: Microsoft Windows; OS X; Linux; PlayStation 4; Xbox One; Nintendo Switch
- Release: Windows, OS X, Linux; 21 October 2014; PS4, Xbox One; 1 March 2016; Nintendo Switch; 29 November 2018
- Genre: First-person shooter
- Modes: Single-player, multiplayer

Screencheat is a first-person shooter video game developed by Samurai Punk and published by Surprise Attack. The game was released for Microsoft Windows, OS X, and Linux in October 2014 and was released for PlayStation 4 and Xbox One in March 2016. The game was later ported to Nintendo Switch in November 2018, under the name Screencheat: Unplugged, and featuring enhanced graphics and a revamped interface.

== Gameplay ==
Screencheat is a multiplayer first-person shooter video game, but in functionality it is a second-person shooter, because every player's character model is invisible. Since the viewpoints of all players are shown on the screen, players are required to look at others' screens to deduce their opponents' location, hence the name of the game. The maps are brightly colored in order to make it easier to figure out where a player is.

Screencheat includes several different gamemodes. Some, including My First Deathmatch, Hillcamper (similar to King of the Hill, but with the hill moved to another place after every few seconds), and Capture the Fun (where players fight for possession of a piñata), are multiplayer FPS standards. The game also has a handful of unique gamemodes, such as One Shot, where each player is limited to one shot and cannot reload until a certain amount of time, and Murder Mystery, in which players have to kill a specific opponent with a particular weapon.

== Development and release ==
Screencheat was developed by Australia-based studio Samurai Punk and published by Surprise Attack. The game's inception came from the 2014 Global Game Jam, where it received several awards and honourable mentions. The game was released for Microsoft Windows, OS X, and Linux on 21 October 2014. Prior to release, a free public beta period ran from 4 August to 3 September. It was released for PlayStation 4 and Xbox One on 1 March 2016. In November 2018, Samurai Punk released Screencheat: Unplugged, optimized for Nintendo Switch with remastered graphics and a new weapon-unlocking system.

== Reception ==
Reception

Aggregate score
Aggregator	Score
Metacritic	71/100 (PC); 69/100 (PS4); 72/100 (XBO)

Review scores
Publication	Score
PC Gamer (US)	78/100
Hooked Gamers	8.3/10
Multiplayer.it	6.5/10
Digitally Downloaded	3.5/5

Screencheat received "mixed or average" reviews from critics upon release, according to review aggregator website Metacritic. Critics praised the game for building an enjoyable experience around a single novel idea, but they also criticized the game's lack of depth, and limited replayability.
