= The Pale Beyond =

2023 video game by Bellular

- Developer: Saltstone Studios
- Publisher: Fellow Traveller
- Director: Thomas Hislop
- Programmers: Thomas Hislop; Noel Watters
- Artists: Jessica Campbell; Ethan Mclean; Katie Noble; Nadine McLaughlin
- Writers: Thomas Hislop; Erica Rivers
- Composers: James Bruce; Jackson Parodi
- Engine: Unity
- Platforms: Windows, macOS, Nintendo Switch
- Release: 24 February 2023
- Genres: Role-playing, survival
- Mode: Single-player

The Pale Beyond is a survival role-playing video game developed by Saltstone Studios and published by Fellow Traveller. It was released for Microsoft Windows and macOS on 24 February 2023. The game follows an Antarctic expedition that gets trapped in the ice as the player must manage the crew successfully to survive. Saltstone Studios, a small development company based in Belfast, created the game and was inspired by historical Antarctic expeditions.

== Gameplay ==
The game requires the player to make decisions regarding crewmembers. In this sequence, the player as First Mate chooses what to do with a stowaway.

As the acting Captain of the Temperance after the Captain's disappearance at the beginning of an Antarctic expedition, the player must manage the crew and keep them alive to survive the ice. The game has time that passes each week, during which the player is responsible for managing a number of resources, including food, fuel, and decorum. "Decorum" represents the ship's overall morale and how the crew is holding together. Each week, the player is responsible for deciding requests which can involve settling fights between crew-members or taking sides on arguments. Often, decisions that could seem reasonable on the face of themselves can lead the player towards ruin, and for a successful playthrough, the player must consider their resources accordingly. It is important to also keep up the loyalty of crew-members in order to ensure survival (and that your decisions are followed or supported). Rations that are on board the ship eventually expire, requiring the crew to hunt for food, and fuel that is available through coal in the ship's stores rapidly depletes as well, requiring the player to carefully stockpile supplies to survive.

The game uses a "locked tree" system, which allows players to attempt to change the fate of their crew either after deleting newer save files or choosing load points after completing a game.

== Story ==
=== Setting ===
The world of The Pale Beyond is closely inspired by the British Empire of the early 20th century, though it remains fictional. The story takes place primarily on a polar continent equivalent to Antarctica, without any overt supernatural elements.

=== Characters ===
The Pale Beyond features an ensemble cast of characters, with the player controlling Robin Shaw. As a blank-slate protagonist, the player defines Shaw's background and personality as the story unfolds; the narrative avoids using gendered pronouns to describe Shaw. Shaw is hired by Captain Rufus Hunt to serve as First Mate. While Hunt is respected by his crew, he is sly and not entirely forthcoming with Shaw at the story's outset.

The other main characters are the expedition's specialists. Brothers Grimley and Yoren Stoke lead the sailors; Grimley is a dour carpenter and accordion player, while Yoren (known as Junior) is more sociable and serves as the ship's cook. The expedition also includes Kurt Darling, a gregarious and swaggering navigator famed for the films of his past expeditions; Clive Hammond, a truculent engineer; and Richard Templeton, the chief science officer and a stickler for hierarchy. As the representative of the expedition's benefactor, Templeton also acts as second-in-command after Shaw becomes captain. Among the civilians, the crew includes the expedition's young and intrepid photographer Kasha Bellford, the timid doctor Arthur Nutlee, and the mysterious, aloof kennel master Lady Cordell.

Additionally, the game features sixteen minor characters: sailors, scouts, engineers, and scientists working under the Stoke brothers, Darling, Hammond, and Templeton, respectively. These characters primarily serve during the resource management portions of the game, though each has a distinct design and personality and plays a role in minor story beats.

=== Plot ===
Robin Shaw is interviewed at the beginning of the game by Captain Hunt, an old Antarctic expeditionary veteran, to be his First Mate on the Temperance, a ship that is leaving for an Antarctic expedition to find The Viscount, a lost expedition and the Temperance's sister ship. However, Hunt remains evasive about the expedition's true goals and its benefactor, and his inattentiveness is evident—at one point, Shaw discovers him drunk in the Captain's quarters.

Hunt goes missing a month after the journey begins once the Temperance gets stranded in Antarctic ice, and as First Mate, the player is put into the role of Captain and must help the vessel survive the polar winter. Templeton informs Shaw that they must hold a vote to become Captain, using the loyalty of the crew (or lack thereof) to determine the result. Templeton also assures Shaw that a rescue party is being sent by their benefactor, but that they must hold out for the set number of weeks needed to make it. After several weeks stranded on the Temperance, the ship sinks from the pressure and the crew makes camp on the ice. As the ground begins to crack, the crew is forced further inland. Eventually, the crew is forced to abandon the ice altogether, salvaging the Temperance's three remaining lifeboats to sail for a nearby island which was presumably the Viscount's final destination.

The crew manage to reach the island and find signs left behind by the Viscount crew, informing them of a supply cache on the coast on the opposite side of the island that can sustain the crew until rescue arrives. The signs also carry a warning not to travel further inland. It is at this point where Shaw must decide whether to prioritize the safety of the crew and head for the coast or focus on their original mission and head inland to discover the fate of the Viscount.

- If Shaw chooses to head for the coast, the crew finds the supply cache and plenty of penguins to hunt as they wait for the rescue ship to arrive. However, one day they are alarmed when the mountain at the center of the island erupts, revealing itself to be a volcano. The rescue ship, having caught sight of the eruption, arrives at the island and safely evacuates Shaw and the crew. They are then met by their benefactor, Lady Appertton who is disappointed that Shaw disobeyed orders and failed to complete the expedition's objective. Depending on how much of the crew survived and how loyal they are to Shaw, Shaw is either pardoned, arrested, or left stranded on the island.
- If Shaw chooses to head inland, they find the still intact Viscount hidden inside a secret cove, with a massive tree having grown on the deck of the ship. Shaw enters the ship and is shocked to find Hunt waiting for him. Hunt explains that the tree's fruit can grant whoever eats it the ability to perceive multiple timelines and even travel between them. Hunt discovered the tree the first time the expedition was stranded and had been going through countless loops trying to either avert the disaster or save the entire crew, but failing every time. The tree is also what the expedition's benefactors are truly seeking. Afterwards, either Hunt or Templeton will try to overthrow Shaw for the role of Captain and puts it up to another crew vote. Depending on Shaw's choices and how the crew votes, the crew will either sail the Viscount and the tree back to civilization or burn down the tree along with the ship to keep its secrets it out of human hands and sending Shaw out on a lifeboat to make contact with the rescue ship.

== Development ==
The Pale Beyond is the first game from Belfast-based video game developer Saltstone Studios. The group was founded by Thomas Hislop and Michael Bell, friends who took programming courses together at Queen's University Belfast. Bell founded a YouTube channel called "Bellular Gaming" which began to get a following while Hislop got involved with theater in his spare time. The friends decided to work together to develop video games as they thought their skillsets would complement each other.

Originally, the studio tried to develop a mobile game which was cancelled before it could be released, and another game which also failed. The studio announced a World of Warcraft mod that would have overhauled the early quests in the game with voice acting and other modern features, which was shut down by the game's developer, Blizzard. Hislop said in an interview that the lessons from these original games they attempted to develop helped to narrow the scope of what they were going to try to create with The Pale Beyond to something that was within their abilities.

The development team used historical Arctic expedition stories, including the Imperial Trans-Antarctic Expedition, the Terra Nova Expedition, and Franklin's lost expedition as inspiration for some of the elements facing the player. Hislop also cited the book The Lost Men, which chronicles the Shackleton expedition's support team that was building depots for them, and Endurance: Shackleton's Incredible Voyage as having anecdotes that were inspiring for their gameplay. The game designers considered adding supernatural horror elements to the game, but consistently decided to stick with real-world survival concerns throughout development. Hislop said that "real history is weirder" in reference to their decision to not include those elements. Hislop noted that animals are commonly afterthoughts in historical accounts of surviving winter cold, and that they wanted to make sure that you felt the tough decisions of deciding to slaughter the sled dogs if you decide to by giving them a voice through the kennel master's character. The game also includes an in-depth focus on how people are interacting and staying together, with Hislop noting that the effect of a shared trauma can bring people together in a unique way.

Hislop noted that they were particularly focused on the artistic design of the title during development. Audio director James Bruce was tasked with making sound effects for the game. The Endurance book had notes about the sound the Endurance made as ice slowly crushed the hull, and Bruce recorded sounds to mimic the noise as described by sailors. The team used BBC Sound Archive recordings of penguins and seals. The sound design was important because of the featureless landscape. Hislop said, "You can't do your normal filler of like, 'Oh, we'll have birds chirping and trees swaying.' It's, 'Uh, James, can you make wind sound interesting for 10 hours? And not repetitive?'"

Following the release of The Pale Beyond, the studio renamed itself to Saltstone Studios, and is currently working on a follow-up title, The Hearth and Harbour.

== Reception ==
The Pale Beyond has received "generally favourable" reviews according to Metacritic. Rock Paper Shotgun's Rachel Watts compared the game favourably with Frostpunk, describing it as "more human" and noted that the game's loyalty system made you make wrenching choices in specific ways. Watts said that "decisions are hard because you're losing characters you've made connections with" but criticised the game for its save system's lengthy time between saves. Polygon's Alexis Ong felt that the game maintained a "desolate sort of charm, rough edges and all" but lightly critiqued a fourth wall breaking moment towards the end of The Pale Beyond's plot along with its overall narrative cohesion.
