= Gunbrella =

2023 video game

- Developer(s): Doinksoft
- Publisher(s): Devolver Digital
- Platform(s): Windows; Nintendo Switch
- Release: September 13, 2023
- Genre(s): Action-adventure, platform
- Mode(s): Single-player

Gunbrella is a 2023 action-adventure video game developed by American indie studio Doinksoft and published by Devolver Digital. The game follows a gruff woodsman on a quest for revenge, armed with the mysterious Gunbrella: a firearm that doubles as an umbrella. Gunbrella combines elements of both the shooter and platformer genres, while incorporating unique gameplay mechanics such as using an umbrella as the primary weapon and tool.

Gunbrella was released on September 13, 2023, for Windows and Nintendo Switch.

== Gameplay ==
Players take on the role of a mysterious protagonist who wields this unique tool to fight enemies, solve puzzles, and traverse various environments. The Gunbrella has three primary functions: shooting projectiles, blocking damage, and can be used to traverse ziplines and other terrains. The game features a blend of a side-scrolling platformer with shooter mechanics. Players will navigate through a series of levels on their journey, and as they investigate the origin of the Gunbrella they will encounter and interrogate cops, cultists, ghouls, and much more. Resources like scrap and spare parts can be acquired for upgrades and ammunition throughout the mysterious journey.

== Plot ==
Set in a dystopian steampunk world, players play as a gruff woodsman who is investigating the origins of the Gunbrella. The weapon has a special insignia on it but otherwise has no other identifying symbols. The protagonist sets their course for the nearest major city to inquire more about the weapon but instead finds himself in a local town that has been besieged by a rebel group. The woodsman finds himself unable to continue his journey since the blockades have halted train services out of the town. Unable to leave, the woodsman begins to explore the secrecy's of the town and its people as he begins his quest to uncover the mystifying origins of the Gunbrella.

== Development ==
Gunbrella is developed by Doinksoft, an independent video game development studio based in Oregon. Doinksoft has also created the titles Demon Throttle, Gato Roboto, and Devolver Bootleg, which are all published by Devolver Digital. Gunbrella was announced at the Nintendo Indie Showcase in May 2022 and was released on September 13, 2023.
