= Matt Trobbiani =

Australian video game developer

- Education: University of Adelaide
- Occupation: Video game developer
- Notable work: Hacknet

Matt Trobbiani is an Australian video game developer and voice actor who developed the indie video game Hacknet (2015).

His experience as a developer was the subject of a profile in Rolling Stone in 2016.

== Education ==
Trobbiani received a Computer Science degree at the University of Adelaide.

== Career ==
=== 2012–2015: Hacknet ===
Trobbiani developed the video game Hacknet as an indie developer, first posting an unfinished version of it on IndieDB in 2012, where it gave the site its highest day of traffic in its history. Despite this, he was unsure of the game's prospects for success, believing that people only downloaded it because it was free. He borrowed $10,000 AUD to finish the game, taking an advance to cover the marketing costs. When it released on Steam in 2015, it garnered a large number of sales, ultimately selling 100,000 copies four months after release and making him "rich" by indie game developer standards.

He was able to make back the cost of development after years of being frugal with his money, earning the equivalent of a six-figure salary for the years he spent developing the game, despite still living in the same house with his siblings where he developed it. In an interview with Game Developer, he stated that, in Hacknet, one of his major goals was to make the player directly be the one who was making decisions, without any avatar separating them from the game.

=== 2016–present: Post-Hacknet ===
In August 2021, Trobbiani released a second game, Wrestledunk Sports, During its development, he began voice-acting for the 2025 game Hollow Knight: Silksong, notably voicing the character Trobbio, who was named after him. He also helped playtest the game near its release. In an interview, Trobbiani described his experience voice acting and testing such a highly-anticipated game, as being a "real privilege". At the October 2026 Nintendo Indie World showcase, Winds of Viridia, a soulslike action-adventure developed by the company Shark Jump and Trobbiani, was announced for early 2027.
