= Oyungezer =

Turkish video game magazine

- March 2022 cover
- Type: Video game magazine
- Format: Paper Magazine
- Owner: Sinan Akkol
- Publisher: Seti Publishing
- Editor: Serpil Ulutürk
- Founded: September 2007
- Language: Turkish
- Headquarters: Istanbul, Turkey
- Circulation: 20,000
- Price: 6.50 YTL
- ISSN: 1307-8933
- Website: oyungezer.com.tr

Oyungezer is a Turkish video game magazine published monthly.

== History ==
Oyungezer was launched by the former editors of the Turkish edition of LeveL, a Czech Republic-based magazine with a similar focus. The editors, after spending a month in recluse, announced the launch of the Oyungezer website and its subsequent forums, with the first issue released in November 2007.

It sold roughly 7,000 copies upon release, which was a record for a first-time issue of a gaming magazine.

== Sections ==
Oyungezer has five distinct sections separated by content:

- A preview section titled 360 drc, edited by Furkan Faruk Akıncı, which focuses on the major new releases of the month.
- A strategy guide edited by the Güven brothers, which offers tips and information concerning specific games.
- Ekran Dışı (Out of the Screen), an entertainment section edited by Damla Pınar Gök. It reviews recently released non-gaming entertainment products, mostly consisting of book, album, and movie reviews. It also hosts reader mail-ins, editor columns, and famed editor Göktuğ Yüksel's personal N.E.M. page.
- Organize Sanayi (Organized Industry), a section focused on hardware.
- Pixel, a retro gaming-focused section.

== Special issues ==
- Xbox 360 OGZ Special (2012)
- League of Legends OGZ Special (2014) (Sold separately)
- League of Legends OGZ Special 2nd issue (2014) (Sold separately)

== Review system ==
Oyungezer reviews are scored between 0.0 and 10.0. The highest score in the magazine was a 9.9 given to Grand Theft Auto IV by Tuğbek Ölek and The Elder Scrolls V: Skyrim by Umut Yanık in the November 2008 issue.

The magazine's lowest scores awarded were a 1.0 for The Incredible Hulk and a 3.0 for Soldier of Fortune: Payback both given by Kaan Alkın.

== Other ventures ==
Oyungezer's parent company, SETİ Yapım ve Yayıncılık has expanded its operations since the inception of the magazine. A sister magazine to Oyungezer, Free-2-Play was released in 2009, focusing on free-to-play MMORPGs.

SETİ Yapım ve Yayıncılık has also undertaken the content management of TTNET Oyun, a digital video game distribution platform created by the leading internet service provider in Turkey, Türk Telekom. SETİ's other projects (all spearheaded by Oyungezer) include The Game, a gaming lobby at the Point Hotel Barbaros in Istanbul, METUTECH-ATOM, a video game development center placed inside the METU, and the Electronic Sports League.
