= Penguin Colony =

2026 video game by Origame Digital

- Developer: Origame Digital
- Publisher: Fellow Traveller Games
- Director: Napthali Faulkner
- Composer: David Mason
- Platforms: Microsoft Windows; Nintendo Switch 2
- Release: Microsoft Windows; October 16, 2026; Nintendo Switch 2; 2027
- Genre: Walking simulator
- Mode: Single-player

Penguin Colony is a 2026 walking simulator video game developed by Origame Digital and published by Fellow Traveller Games, featuring the voice of Lenval Brown. The game is an anti-colonial retelling of At the Mountains of Madness, and places the player as a penguin, who is free to explore and observe the remains of a doomed Nazi scientific expedition to Antarctica. The game draws extensively on its developers' own Māori culture. It received generally positive reviews upon release, with critics praising its unusual perspective and its cultural/political critique, but also noting its short runtime, awkward controls and sparse, sometimes monotonous presentation.

== Gameplay and plot ==
Penguin Colony places the player in control of a penguin in an Antarctic setting inspired by At the Mountains of Madness, and tasks them with exploring the surrounding area, instructing the player to "follow the wind" to progress. The game incorporates some puzzle and platformer elements, as well as penguin-centric belly-sliding and swimming mechanics, and the ability to switch between control of different penguins, but the game has been described as a walking simulator overall.

While the player controls a penguin, the game's story is told through voice-over narration, primarily from Howard Blakely, an English scientist accompanying a Nazi German expedition to the Antarctic wilderness (voiced by Lenval Brown of Disco Elysium fame). By the time of the player's arrival, the expedition has already fallen into disarray, with most of its members dead, mutilated, or consumed by madness. Interspersed between the penguin-exploration components, cutscenes highlight the struggles of a group of Māori warriors, who are revealed to be racing to contain and defeat the Nazis and their discoveries. In a final series of cutscenes at the end of the game, the Māori warriors find Howard in the throes of delusions of grandeur, kill him, and then reckon with the destruction already unleashed and the future, similar evils to come.

Towards the end of the game, gameplay sequences are increasingly interrupted by fourth-wall breaking images of Māori art and music, and mixed-media footage denouncing the genocides committed by the British Empire, as well as the general silence of the video games industry in response to the Gaza genocide.

Following the game's conclusion, the player is presented with a "star map" of their journey through the game that highlights the various collectibles and sites that they encountered, encouraging players to share and discuss their results and noting the form's connection to astronomical methods used for traditional Polynesian navigation.

== Release and reception ==
Reception

Aggregate score
Aggregator	Score
Metacritic	(PC) 74/100

Review score
Publication	Score
The Guardian	4/5

Penguin Colony received mixed to positive reviews on release, with critics praising the game's unusual lens and its forceful critique of both Lovecraftian horror and European colonialism, while criticizing its short length and lack of catharsis. In a mixed review for Screen Rant, Ben Brosofsky noted that the game's brief runtime and at times monotonous gameplay stop short of delivering a "definitive punch" to players. Writing for Rock Paper Shotgun, Edwin Evans-Thirwell praised the game's absurdist sense of humor and called it "probably the best pisstake of Lovecraft and Lovecraftian horror" in a video game, making special note of the game's metatextual critique of the soulslike genre. The Guardian's Lewis Gordon described it as one of the year's "boldest, most original games," specifically praising the game's "star map" feature for highlighting what you missed.

At the request of the game's developer and with the support of its publisher, the game is not available for sale in Israel in order to "demonstrate solidarity with Palestine".
