= The Stillness of the Wind =

2019 farming simulation game

- Developer: Lambic Studios (Coyan Cardenas)
- Publisher: Fellow Traveler
- Engine: Unity
- Platforms: Windows, Nintendo Switch
- Release: WW: February 7, 2019
- Genre: Simulation
- Mode: Single player

The Stillness of the Wind is a farming simulation game developed by Coyan Cardenas and published by Fellow Traveler. An indie game released on February 7, 2019, The Stillness of the Wind focuses on Talma, an elderly goat farmer who tends her isolated farm as messages from the city where her family has moved become darker and darker. The game's thematic focus on aging and loss is a marked contrast from other games in the cozy genre. Reception to the game was generally positive.

== Gameplay ==
Talma farms on her land and waters her crops.

Stillness follows a Harvest Moon-esque gameplay style, where the player controls Talma, an elderly farmer who takes care of goats, chickens, and plants. Unlike other farming simulation games, Talma moves slowly and struggles with basic tasks, but emotes joy when taking care of her animals and laughs when playing on the ground. Talma is able to forage in the desert for fungi, and interact with a passing salesman. Letters are sent from family members speaking of an unknown, but dark situation in the city and the tone of their language has increasing desperation as the game continues.

The game thematically focuses on Talma's determination and journey as a farmer. As time passes, Talma begins to dream and hallucinate (as Talma farms, she may hear the sounds of children playing, or she can listen to the horn of a train, signifying her memories of the past and her possible dementia). Seasons begin to change, forcing the player to adapt to new situations. In the end of the game during winter, Talma passes away.

== Development ==
Coyan Cardenas, a solo developer and founder of Lambic Studios, began development of The Stillness of the Wind after completing a previous indie game, Where the Goats Are. The idea for a game set in a rural, lonely life was from when Cardenas and his girlfriend would fantasize about moving out of London to raise goats on a homestead in the countryside. The melancholic setting and story emerged during development, as the structure of the game lent itself to the narrative of "isolation" from civilization. Cardenas also intentionally designed the game to be the reverse of the "hero's journey" that is common across the video game industry. He was inspired by the films Andrei Tarkovsky's Nostalghia and Béla Tarr's The Turin Horse, and from the novel One Hundred Years of Solitude by Gabriel García Márquez.

Where the Goats Are, Cardenas's first attempt at tackling the concept, was intended to be a month-long project, and Cardenas had minimized the scope of the game to fit the timetables he created for himself. Feeling that he had not properly explored the idea fully in Goats, Cardenas decided to make a follow-up game on the same subject instead of developing something completely new. Cardenas added features that were not previously in Goats to The Stillness of the Wind, including goat breeding, foraging, and gardening. After finishing work on The Stillness of the Wind, an exhausted Cardenas took six months off before coming back to game development.

== Reception ==
Reception

Aggregate score
Aggregator	Score
Metacritic	(PC) 76/100 (NS) 66/100

Review scores
Publication	Score
The Guardian	4/5
Slant Magazine	4.5/5

According to review aggregator website Metacritic, the PC version of The Stillness of the Wind received generally favorable reviews while the Nintendo Switch version was met with mixed or average reviews. The Guardian's Andy Robertson felt that the game "encourages thinking about old age in a unique and provocative way", but noted that the writing could be "heavy-handed" at times. Slant Magazine's Jed Pressgrove, in a positive review, noted that the game helps you "grasp the importance that every moment can have on a mortal plane". Polygon's Colin Campbell said that the game was "less about doing and more about feeling", and called it "meditative, slow, and sad".
