= Orwell (video game) =

Simulation video game

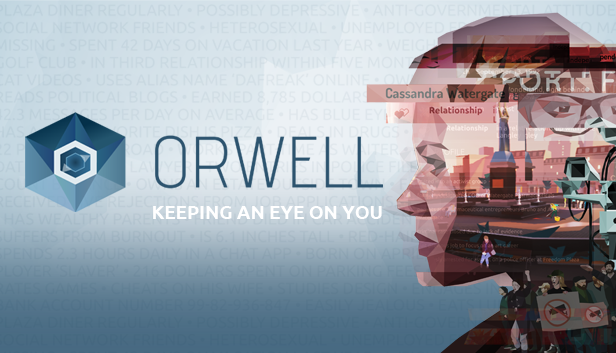
- Developer: Osmotic
- Engine: Unity
- Platforms: Windows, OS X, Linux, Android, iOS
- Release: Windows; October 27, 2016; Linux, OS X; December 16, 2016; iOS; March 31, 2020; Android; July 3, 2020
- Genre: Simulation
- Mode: Single-player

Orwell is a series of episodic simulation video games by indie developer Osmotic Studios in which the player assumes the role of a state operative and monitors surveillance sources to find national security threats.

== Overview ==
Orwell was created by German developer Osmotic Studios. The series is named after George Orwell, the author of the dystopian novel Nineteen Eighty-Four, references to which can be found throughout the game. The first game in the series, subtitled 'Keeping an Eye on You', was released as a five-part episodic series on October 20, 2016. A three-part sequel subtitled 'Ignorance is Strength' was released February 22, 2018.

== Plot ==
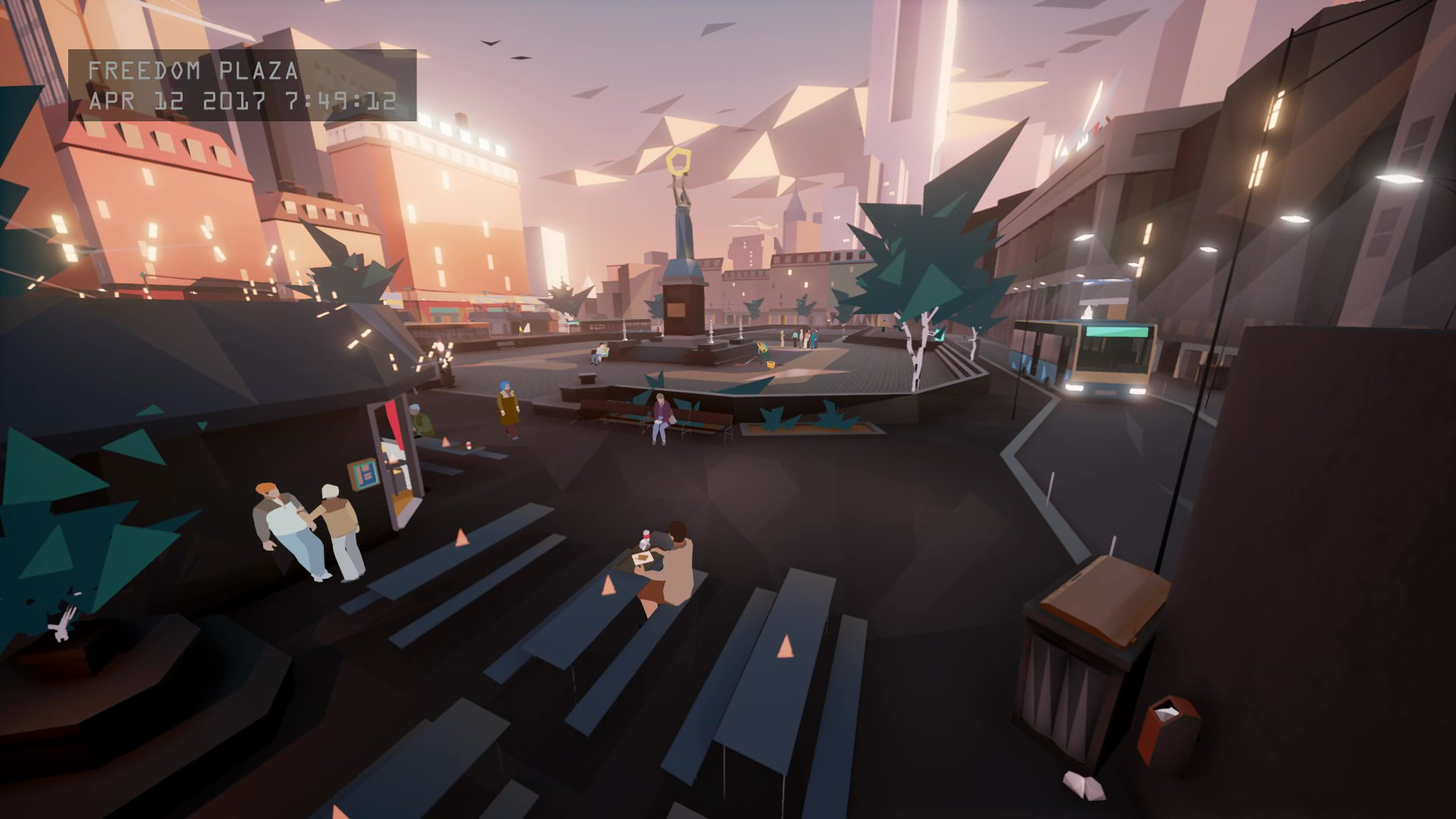
The Freedom Plaza in Bonton, seen in the opening cutscene

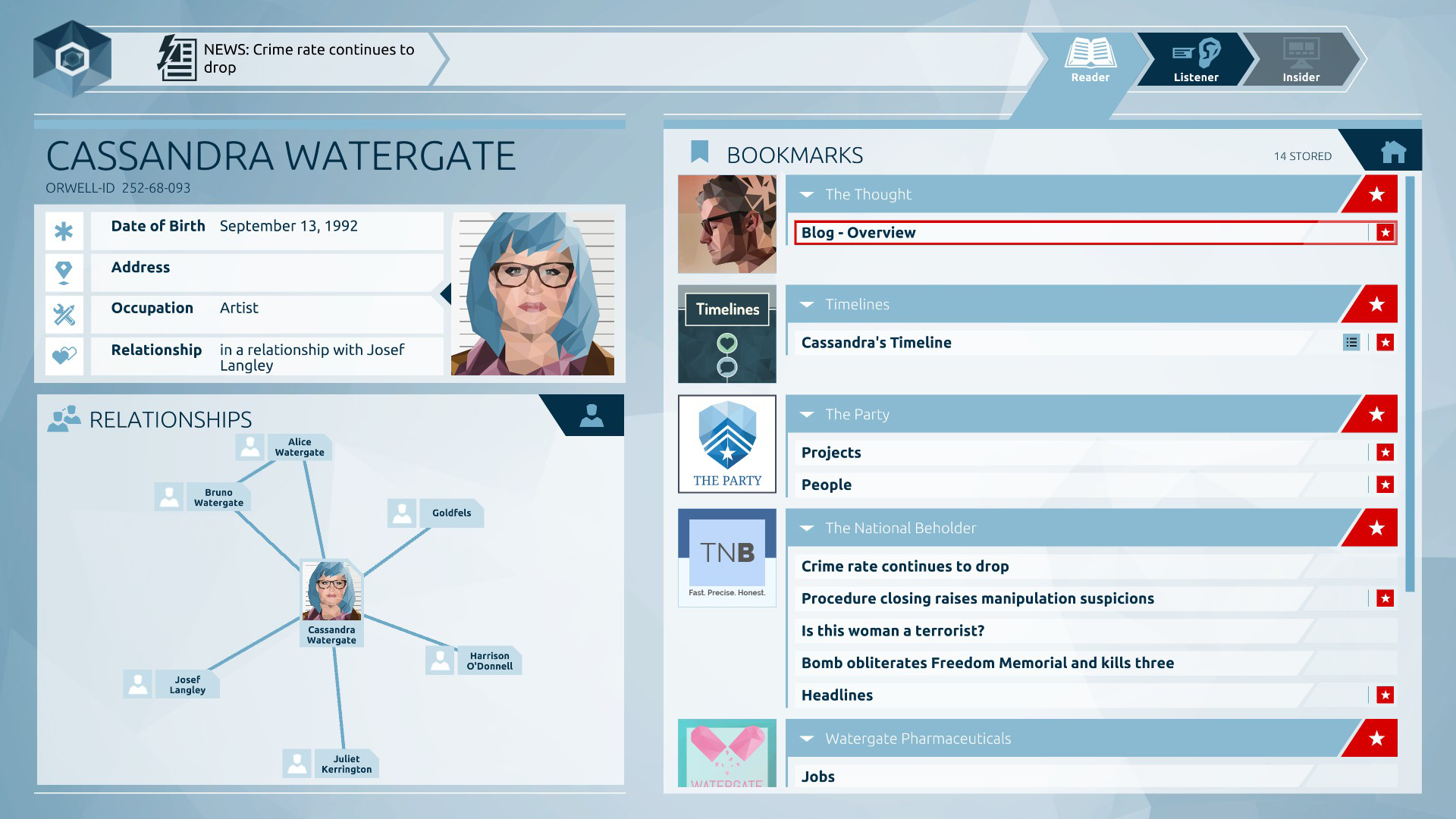
The game's interface

Orwell takes place in a country called The Nation, led by a paternalistic and authoritarian government known as The Party in the capital of Bonton. In 2011, The Party passed the Safety Bill, a law expanding the government's ability to spy on its citizens in the name of national security. As part of the bill the Ministry of Security, led by Secretary of Security Catherine Delacroix, commissioned a covert surveillance system codenamed Orwell.

The player takes the role of an Orwell investigator outside of The Nation, who has just been selected to use the system. Each episode takes place over one in-game day.

== Orwell: Keeping an Eye on You (2016) ==
No.	Title	Original release date
1	"The Clocks Were Striking Thirteen"	October 20, 2016
On April 12, 2017, a bomb explodes in the populated Freedom Plaza in Bonton, destroying the statue and killing several people. A note containing the first three stanzas of the German folk song Die Gedanken sind frei (The Thoughts are Free) is found at the site. Present at the Plaza shortly before the explosion was Cassandra Watergate, an artist who was arrested for assaulting a police officer at a protest at the Plaza several weeks prior. The player is tasked by their assigned Advisor Symes to investigate Cassandra as their only lead, with the goal of determining whether she had anything to do with the bombing. The player explores Cassandra's various correspondence and finds various connections: her acquittal from the assault charge due to a lack of evidence, her relationship with her defense lawyer Josef Langley, her reliance on antidepressants, and her association with a group called Thought, via a man called Goldfels. Eventually, Cassandra confesses in a private conversation with Juliet that she did assault the police officer in a rage, although Juliet counters that Cassandra did it to defend her against him. It is up to the player which version they upload, but either way the assault charge is reopened and Cassandra is again arrested for it. Suddenly, a second bomb explodes at Bonton's Stelligan University, ruling Cassandra out as the bomber.
2	"A Place Where There Is No Darkness"	October 27, 2016
Still reeling from the news of the second explosion, Symes tasks the player with investigating the Thought group and Goldfels in particular. It isn't long before the player is able to identify Goldfels as Abraham Goldfels, a former Stelligan lecturer and activist. Thought is soon identified as an activist group protesting the government's pro-surveillance stance, identifying Abraham as the leader and two of his former students as key members: national newspaper columnist Harrison O'Donnell and Rhosen Tech's PR Assistant Juliet Kerrington. At the same time, the group's blog is hacked by an individual identifying themselves as Initiate, with Harrison reversing the hack shortly after. In addition to finding another Thought activist known as Nina, the player also finds out that Thought had previously protested at Freedom Plaza, Stelligan and an unknown third location, suggesting a third bomb was about to explode. Investigating further, the player finds two separate locations the bomb could be. To get a definitive answer, Symes remotely interrogates Cassandra using the information acquired by the player. If the player chooses the right location and has found enough information on Cassandra, she identifies the third location as the Circle Mall, and the bomb is defused. Otherwise, the bomb explodes with many casualties.
3	"Unperson"	November 3, 2016
Regardless of the events in the previous episode, Symes tasks the player with investigating Nina as the suspected bomber. The player soon learns that Nina is Sergeant Nina Maternova, a single mother and former combat engineer in the Nation's army. After her lover was killed in battle, she was dishonorably discharged for going AWOL and has since suffered from PTSD. While the player investigates, Initiate contacts Nina asking about the bombs which Nina denies knowledge of. As a prank, Initiate attempts to hack the Party's website - The player is able to warn the site's IT people in time, or can instead allow it to happen. Getting paranoid, Nina notices the player's intrusions into her computer and decides to escape with her son. Depending on the information the player has previously uploaded about Nina, as well as what the player uploads during Nina's attempted escape, she can either be arrested, escape or be killed in a shootout. After the events with Nina, her email account receives an email from Abraham, detailing the bombs as a plan between the two of them.
4	"Memory Hole"	November 10, 2016
Shocked at the revelation from the previous day, Symes tasks the player with once again investigating Abraham with the goal of finding his location. While this is going on, Harrison & Juliet discuss the events with Nina, deciding to seek help from Josef. At the same time, Josef is contacted by an anonymous sender offering to release Cassandra from custody in exchange for information on Thought's members. The player is able to separately investigate Josef due to his past connection with Abraham & Cassandra. It's revealed that Josef once represented Abraham in a court case, and was asked by him to represent Cassandra for her assault charge. A regular money transfer from his bank account can also be found by the player and marked as charitable or suspicious. At the same time, Harrison gets in touch with Initiate and tries to recruit him into Thought, to which Initiate identifies himself as an existing member. Initiate reveals the existence of Orwell to Harrison. Knowing they're both being listened to, they quickly make plans using an encryption cipher provided by Initiate. Shortly after, the investigation into Thought is leaked to the National Beholder newspaper, causing Harrison to lose his columnist job and Thought's blog to be flooded with hate comments. Soon after, the player investigates Juliet's computer and suffers a strange disconnection from Orwell's servers. Feeling the pressure, Harrison & Juliet call Josef who reveals the implication of the Safety Bill: out-of-context quotes can be used against a target, and with their collective association with Thought, they can all be arrested if Thought is determined to have been created for terrorist purposes. Depending on the player's actions with Josef's regular account, he is either arrested shortly after the call or he incriminates Harrison as a person of interest. Eventually, the player finds that Abraham was once called Gunther Aarons, a person from Stuttgart who went missing in 1993 and migrated to the Nation. In addition, they find that Abraham had suffered from an inoperable cancer and had died over a year prior to the game's events, meaning that someone else was using his identity to cause the bombings. At the same time, the previous disconnection is revealed to have been an attack on Orwell by Initiate. In a new post on Thought's blog, Harrison reveals Symes as Benjamin Costigan and reveals his personal information, including his address.
5	"Under the Spreading Chestnut Tree"	November 18, 2016
Instead of Symes, the player is greeted by Minister Delacroix as their new advisor, rating their performance so far. Depending on whether the player let Nina escape, Symes is revealed to either be in hiding or shot to death at his home. Abraham is revealed to have returned and calls all Thought members to a conference call at 4 pm. Noting the time needed to process datachunks, Delacroix limits the player to uploading only 20 datachunks. Each member of Thought reacts differently to Abraham's return, with Initiate in particular believing it to be a trap. At the same time, Cassandra is released by the authorities. Once the player has used up their datachunk limit, the conference call starts with all remaining Thought members (excluding Nina) present. At the same time, Initiate attacks Orwell again using an IP provided by Abraham, taking over the player's control. Within the conference call, Initiate reads the information acquired by the player and realises that Abraham died long before the bombings and deduces that Abraham is in fact Juliet. During the call, depending on whether the player has uploaded a certain location on Harrison's phone, Harrison will stay in the call or be arrested. Juliet confesses to orchestrating the game's events, including masquerading as Abraham, the manipulation of Nina and the re-incrimination of Cassandra. Juliet then reveals that Thought had failed in its goals of peaceful protest and that everything was meant to convince only one person of Orwell's failings: the player. Juliet notes that as an observer of everything that had played out, the player understood the fundamental issues with Orwell and could bring down the system by highlighting themselves as a target person. Initiate protests against this, and instead suggests the player incriminates Delacroix. Each member of Thought reads the player's record on themselves and decides to either support the player or refuses to do so. At this stage, the player has the choice of one of several actions: Incrimination of Thought - Delacroix provides remote access to Initiate's PC, which identifies him as a South African security programmer who once did an internship at Rhosen Tech and subsequently knew the real Abraham well. After finding an out-of-context line which suggests Thought was created as a terrorist cell, all the members are arrested. Orwell is rolled out to the delight of the public, and the player is promoted to advisor and invited to immigrate to The Nation.; Delacroix's Demise - Initiate provides access to Delacroix's PC, but she pulls the plug on it before the player can get anything. However, the player is able to get access to her phone via other means. The player subsequently finds messages from Delacroix remarking the bombings as a good thing, and her being the one behind the Thought leak to the National Beholder. Uploading either confession causes Delacroix to resign, Orwell to be dismantled by an independent agency, and for the player to be wanted by the Nation for their part in Orwell, pending extradition.; Self-Sacrifice - Following Juliet's plea, the player finds a PC left on by Abraham before his death. The files on his PC detail his role in the development of Orwell, as well as his past dealings with Juliet and Initiate. Through the files, the player finds Orwell's record on themselves, confirming Juliet's past claim that Orwell was also keeping an eye on the investigators despite not being Nation citizens. The player then uploads the details on themselves, knowing that followup on uploaded chunks is mandatory. The subsequent events cause a global outcry, causing the Party to shut down Orwell as well as Thought to become a major political party. The player is made an honorary member of Thought, mainly in an attempt to get them a pardon due to crimes against the state.; A Half-Hearted Attempt - The player attempts to incriminate Delacroix, via the above messages, but fails to gain access to her phone. The player subsequently decides to turn in the members of Thought through the transcript of Initiate and the real Abraham, as stated above. Orwell is announced publicly, with neither positive nor negative opinions, all members of Thought are arrested (including Juliet), Delacroix is left alone, and the player is wanted for arrest. It is unknown what happens to Initiate.; Regardless of the final outcome, the game ends with the player, (either as their character or a different, unknown person) uploading a datachunk into their character's profile, suggesting that some form of Orwell lives on.

== Orwell: Ignorance is Strength (2018) ==
A sequel, entitled Orwell: Ignorance is Strength, was announced in August 2017.

No.	Title	Original release date
1	"Thesis"	February 22, 2018
On the same day as the Freedom Plaza bombing, Captain Oleg Bakay of the Parges Army receives a threatening phone call on a confidential phone and subsequently disappears. Advisor Ampleford tasks the player with finding Bakay. The player explores the relationship between Bakay and the caller, Raban Vhart of the anti-government People's Voice blog, both being from the neighboring country of Parges, Vhart being the principal of the school which Bakay's daughter attended, and the school being destroyed in an attack in 2007. It is also discovered that Bakay is a turned asset covertly working for the Nation, and that he disappeared because his cover was blown. Eventually, Bakay is found hiding in a reinforced cellar below the destroyed school. Depending on the information provided by the player, a team sent by Ampleford either apprehends Bakay or executes him as a traitor. Regardless of the outcome, Vhart uses footage from cameras in the cellar to show the team's actions, blaming the school attack on Bakay and inciting his followers to protest.
2	"Antithesis"	March 8, 2018
Emboldened by the response to the previous day's events, Raban discussed with his wife Karen & brother Ilya that he intends to send a public provocation for Parges's President Kassart. Ampleford tasks the player with stopping the provocation, using Raban's relations with the two as a weapon against him. The player explores the lives of both and finds suspicious activity from both, including Ilya being accused for a missing pharmaceutical shipment and Karen quietly providing counselling to Nina Maternova. Depending on what the player uploads, either can be arrested (or depending on the player's actions in Keeping An Eye on You, Karen can be injured in the Circle Mall bombing). Alternatively, if both suspicion are accounted for, the player can instead discover that Ilya & Karen are having an affair with one another, both alienated by Raban's increasingly extreme behavior. Whatever scandal the player finds is leaked anonymously on social media. Depending on how long the player takes, the resulting coverage either diminishes the impact of Raban's provocation or forces him not to publish it altogether.
3	"Synthesis"	March 22, 2018
The player is introduced in this chapter to the final tool on the bar, as the player looks for information to create narratives to combat a series of articles released during the day, by literally hijacking public discourse in an attempt to discredit Raban's credibility and reach.

== Reception ==
Reception

Aggregate score
Aggregator	Score
Metacritic	77/100

Review scores
Publication	Score
Game Informer	6/10
GameSpot	8/10
Polygon	9/10

Orwell received an aggregate score of 77/100 on Metacritic, indicating generally favorable reviews. The first season was reviewed and generally well-received by multiple gaming news outlets. Destructoid considered it a potential game of the year, calling it "a fantastic nail-biter, taking all the best parts of Person of Interest, The Conversation, The Lives of Others, and putting them in a post-Snowden world." Polygon lauded the game for making a "thrilling adventure" from "how we balance our own liberty and our safety", particularly the dilemmas the game presents. GameSpot also liked that "choices matter and resonate", and praised how the game "uses simple mechanics to tell a complex and engaging story, one that feels particularly relevant". The Verge described that the game's "uncomfortable" decisions became a "selling point", saying that "it's rare for a game to put you in such a morally compromising position".

However, Rock Paper Shotgun said that the game "takes a significant bite out of the thrill of the snoop" because "the actual research is severely limited", and "the sense of achievement is mightily diminished". PC Gamer also criticized the game because "you don't do much actual investigation", and "the drama hangs on you deciding between two conflicting pieces of information—a gut instinct guess, with no way to further your understanding of the situation". Game Informer was even more critical of the game, saying that they did not find Orwell's treatment of surveillance and terrorism compelling, and that the game is "simply content to repeat what novels and films have more eloquently".

The follow-up Ignorance is Strength received an aggregate score of 74/100 on Metacritic, suggesting "mixed or average reviews". Destructoid said "Orwell continues to be a solid thriller" and "the fact it's got me thinking at all is a success in itself." However, GameSpot said that the sequel "does not leave as strong an impression as the first game did, even if the central mechanics are still inherently compelling". Rock Paper Shotgun criticized the pacing of the episodes, and that the game's introduction was not very interesting.
