= Alfred Lansing =

American journalist and writer (1921–1975)

Alfred Mark Lansing (July 21, 1921 – August 27, 1975) was an American journalist and writer, best known for his book Endurance: Shackleton's Incredible Voyage (1959), an account of Sir Ernest Shackleton's Antarctic explorations.

== Life ==
Lansing was a native of Chicago, Illinois, the son of Edward (1896–1949), a Chicagoan who worked as an electrician, and his wife Ruth Henderson (1896–1975), a native of New Jersey. After serving in the U.S. Navy from 1940 to 1946, where he received a Purple Heart, he enrolled at North Park College and later at Northwestern University, where he majored in journalism. He edited a weekly newspaper in Illinois until 1949, when he joined the United Press and in 1952 became a freelance writer. He spent time in New York, writing for the books section of Reader's Digest and Time Inc., eventually returning to Chicago to become the editor of the Bethel Home News. Lansing settled in Bethel, CT where he was the editor of the Bethel Home News. He died there in 1975.

== Endurance: Shackleton's Incredible Voyage ==
Lansing is best known for his best-selling book Endurance: Shackleton's Incredible Voyage, the account of the failed Imperial Trans-Antarctic Expedition of Sir Ernest Shackleton and his crew to the South Pole in 1914. The book is named after the ship used by Shackleton, the Endurance, and it became a bestseller when it was first published in 1959. Whilst researching the book, Lansing spoke with ten of the expedition's surviving members and was granted access to the journals and personal diaries of eight others in order to get a more complete view of the expedition. While he was writing Endurance, Lansing lived in Sea Cliff, Long Island, with his wife, Barbara, son Angus, and daughter, Holly.

== Bibliography ==
- Drugs (Series: LIFE Science Library) with Walter Modell (1967)
- Endurance: Shackleton's Incredible Voyage (1959)
