= List of role-playing video games: 2022 to 2023 =

This is a comprehensive index of commercial role-playing video games (RPGs), sorted chronologically by year. Information regarding release platform, release type, RPG subgenre, game setting, developers, publishers, and country of origin is provided where available. The table can be sorted by clicking on the small boxes next to the column headings.

This list includes all RPG subgenres, including MMORPGs, Action RPGs and Tactical RPGs. This list does not include MUDs and Roguelikes by default, unless they have an additional RPG subgenre. For standalone lists on these subgenres, see List of MUDs and List of roguelikes

== Legend ==
Video game platforms
LIN	Linux, SteamOS	Luna	Amazon Luna	OSX	macOS
NS	Nintendo Switch	PS4	PlayStation 4	PS5	PlayStation 5
WIN	Windows, all versions Windows 95 and up	XBO	Xbox One	XBX/S	Xbox Series X/S

Types of releases
Compilation	A compilation, anthology or collection of several titles, usually (but not always) belonging to the same series
Early access	A game launched in early access is unfinished and thus might contain bugs and glitches or have some of the content missing
Episodic	An episodic video game that is released in batches over a period of time
Expansion	A large-scale DLC to an already existing game that adds new story, areas and additions and/or changes to the game's mechanics
Full release	A full release of a game that launched in early access first
Limited	A special release (often called "Limited" or "Collector's Edition") with bonus collector's material. Often provided to people who pre-order a game
Port	The game first appeared on a different platform and a port was made. The game is like the original, with few or no differences
Remake	The game is an enhanced remake of an original, made using a new engine and/or assets and thus containing completely new sound, graphics and possibly changes to the story and/or gameplay
Remaster	The game is a remaster of an original, released on the same or different platform, with (usually minor) changes to graphics, sound and/or gameplay
Rerelease	The game was re-released on the same platform with no or only minor changes

Video game genres
Action RPG	Action role-playing game	Dungeon crawl	Dungeon crawl	JRPG	Japanese-style role-playing game
MMORPG	Massively multiplayer online RPG	Monster tamer	Monster-taming game	MUD	Multi-user dungeon
Real-time	Real-time game	Roguelike	Roguelike, Roguelite	Sandbox	Sandbox game
Soulslike	Soulslike	Tactical RPG	Tactical role-playing game	Turn-based	Turn-based game

== List ==
Year	Title	Platform	Type	RPG Subgenre	Setting	Developer	Publisher	COO	Ref.
2022	.hack//G.U. Last Recode	NS		Action RPG		CyberConnect2	Bandai Namco Entertainment		
2022	Adventure Academia: The Fractured Continent	WW: NS, PS4,WIN		Tactical RPG		Acquire	JP: Acquire; WW: PQube		
2022	Airoheart	WIN, NS, PS4, PS5, XBO, XBX/S				Pixel Heart Studio	Soedesco		
2022	ANNO: Mutationem	NS, WIN, PS4, PS5		Action RPG		ThinkingStars	Lightning Games		
2022	The Ascent	PS4, PS5		Action RPG		Neon Giant	Curve Digital		
2022	Astlibra Revision	WIN		Action RPG		KEIZO	WhisperGames		
2022	Astro Aqua Kitty	PS5		Action RPG		Tikipod			
2022 (WW)	Atelier Sophie 2: The Alchemist of the Mysterious Dream	WIN, NS, PS4				Gust	Koei Tecmo		
2022 (WW)	Babylon's Fall	WIN, PS4, PS5	Original	Action RPG	Fantasy	PlatinumGames	Square Enix	JP	
2022	Baldur's Gate: Dark Alliance II	WIN, OSX, LIN, NS, PS4, PS5, XBO, XBX/S		Action RPG		Black Isle Studios	Interplay Entertainment		
2022	Biomotor Unitron	NS				SNK			
2022	Biomutant	PS5, XBX/S		Action RPG		Experiment 101	THQ Nordic		
2022	Black Witchcraft	WIN		Action RPG		Quattro Gear	Crest		
2022	Blackguards 2	NS		Tactical RPG		Daedalic Entertainment			
2022	Blossom Tales II: The Minotaur Prince	WIN, LIN, NS				Castle Pixel	Playtonic Friends		
2022 (JP)	Bravely Default: Brilliant Lights	iOS, DROID				Square Enix			
2022	Bravery & Greed	WIN, NS, PS4, XBO		Roguelike, Dungeon crawl		Rekka Games	Team17		
2022	Brigandine: The Legend of Runersia	WIN		Tactical RPG		Matrix Software	Happinet		
2022 (JP)	Cadavers for Dinner	NS, PS4		Tactical RPG		Nippon Ichi Software			
2022	The Caligula Effect 2	WIN				historia, FuRyu	historia		
2022	Captain Velvet Meteor: The Jump+ Dimensions	NS		Action RPG		Shueisha			
2022	Chained Echoes	WIN, OSX, LIN, NS, PS4, XBO				Matthias Linda	Deck13 Spotlight		
2022	Chrono Cross: The Radical Dreamers Edition	WIN, NS, PS4, XBO				Square Enix			
2022	Circus Electrique	WIN, NS, PS4, PS5, XBO, XBX/S		Tactical RPG		Zen Studios	Saber Interactive		
2022 (WW)	Citizen Sleeper	WIN, OSX, NS, XBO, XBX/S	Original	Narrative RPG	Sci-fi	Jump Over the Age	Fellow Traveller	UK	
2022	Coromon	NS				TRAGsoft	Freedom Games		
2022	Crisis Core: Final Fantasy VII Reunion	WIN, NS, PS4, PS5, XBO, XBX/S		Action RPG		Square Enix			
2022 (WW)	Crystar	NS		Action RPG		Gemdrops	JP: FuRyu; WW: NIS America		
2022	Crystarise	WIN		Action RPG		Yukiusagi Games			
2022 (JP)	Custom Robo	NS		Action RPG					
2022 (JP)	Custom Robo V2	NS		Action RPG					
2022	Cyberpunk 2077	PS5, XBX/S		Action RPG		CD Projekt Red			
2022	Danganronpa S: Ultimate Summer Camp	WIN, PS4, iOS, DROID				Spike Chunsoft			
2022	Dark Deity	NS		Tactical RPG		Sword & Axe LLC	Freedom Games		
2022 (EU/NA)	Death End Request 2	NS				Compile Heart	Idea Factory		
2022	Demon Gaze Extra	NS, PS4, WIN		Dungeon crawl		Cattle Call, Kadokawa Games	Clouded Leopard Entertainment		
2022	Diablo Immortal	iOS, DROID, WIN		Action RPG		Blizzard Entertainment, NetEase	Blizzard Entertainment		
2022 (WW)	Digimon Survive	WIN, NS, PS4, XBO		Tactical RPG		Hyde	Bandai Namco Entertainment		
2022	The Diofield Chronicle	WIN, NS, PS4, PS5, XBO, XBX/S		Tactical RPG		Square Enix, Lancarse	Square Enix		
2022	Disgaea 4: A Promise Revisited	iOS, DROID		Tactical RPG		Nippon Ichi Software			
2022 (WW)	Disgaea 6 Complete	WIN, PS4, PS5		Tactical RPG		Nippon Ichi Software			
2022	Disney Mirrorverse	iOS, DROID		Action RPG		Kabam			
2022	Dolmen	WIN, PS4, PS5, XBO, XBX/S		Action RPG		Massive Work Studio	Prime Matter		
2022	Doraemon Story of Seasons: Friends of the Great Kingdom	WIN, NS, PS5				Marvelous	Bandai Namco Entertainment		
2022	Dragon Quest Builders	iOS, DROID		Action RPG, Sandbox		Square Enix			
2022	Dragon Quest Treasures	NS		Action RPG		Tose	Square Enix		
2022 (JP)	Dragon Quest X Offline	WIN, NS, PS4, PS5		MMORPG		B.B. Studio	Square Enix		
2022 (JP)	Dragon Quest X Online All In One Package version 1-6	WIN, NS, PS4		MMORPG		Square Enix			
2022	Dual Universe	WIN		MMORPG, Sandbox		Novaquark			
2022	Dungeon Defenders: Awakened	PS4		Action RPG		Chromatic Games			
2022	Dungeon Munchies	PS4, PS5, WIN, OSX, NS		Action RPG		Majaja	Chorus Worldwide		
2022 (WW)	Dusk Diver 2	NS, PS4, PS5, WIN		Action RPG		WANIN Games	JP: Justdan International; WW: Idea Factory		
2022	Dying Light 2 Stay Human	WIN, NS, PS4, PS5, XBO, XBX/S	Original	Action RPG		Techland			
2022	EarthBound	NS							
2022	EarthBound Beginnings	NS							
2022	Echoes of Mana	iOS, DROID		Action RPG		WFS	Square Enix		
2022	Edens Zero: Pocket Galaxy	iOS, DROID				Konami			
2022	Edge of Eternity	NS, PS4, PS5, XBO, XBX/S				Midgar Studio	Dear Villagers		
2022	Eiyuden Chronicle: Rising	WIN, NS, PS4, PS5, XBO, XBX/S		Action RPG		Rabbit & Bear Studios	505 Games		
2022 (WW)	Elden Ring	WIN, PS4, PS5, XBO, XBX/S	Original	Action RPG	Dark fantasy	FromSoftware	Bandai Namco Entertainment	JP	
2022	The Elder Scrolls Online: High Isle	PS4, PS5, XBO, XBX/S, WIN, OSX, Stadia		MMORPG		ZeniMax Online Studios	Bethesda Softworks		
2022 (WW)	ELEX II	WIN, PS4, PS5, XBO, XBX/S	Original	Action RPG	Post-apocalyptic, Sci-fi	Piranha Bytes	THQ Nordic	DE	
2022 (WW)	Expeditions: Rome	WIN	Original	Tactical RPG	Historical	Logic Artists	THQ Nordic	DK	
2022 (JP)	Fairy Fencer F: Refrain Chord	NS, PS4, PS5		Tactical RPG		Sting	Compile Heart		
2022	Fallen Angel	NS		Action RPG		Matrioshka Games	V Publishing		
2022 (EU/NA)	Fallen Legion Revenants	WIN, PS5, XBO, XBX/S		Action RPG		YummyYummyTummy	NIS America		
2022 (EU/NA)	Fallen Legion: Rise to Glory	WIN, PS5, XBO, XBX/S		Action RPG		YummyYummyTummy	NIS America		
2022	Final Fantasy VI Pixel Remaster	WIN, iOS, DROID				Square Enix			
2022	Final Fantasy VII Remake Intergrade	WIN		Action RPG		Square Enix			
2022	Fire Emblem Warriors: Three Hopes	NS				Omega Force	Nintendo		
2022	Fishing Paradiso	WIN, OSX, LIN, NS				Odencat			
2022	Foxhole	WIN		MMORPG, Sandbox		Siege Camp			
2022	Front Mission 1st: Remake	NS		Tactical RPG		MegaPixel Studio	Forever Entertainment		
2022 (JP)	Fullmetal Alchemist Mobile	iOS, DROID		Tactical RPG		Square Enix			
2022	G-Mode Archives+: Megami Tensei Gaiden: Shinyaku Last Bible	NS				G-Mode			
2022	Gamedec	NS				Anshar Studios	Untold Tales		
2022	Garden Story	XBO		Action RPG		Picogram	Kowloon Nights, Rose City Games		
2022 (JP)	Genkai Tokki: Seven Pirates H	NS				Felistella	Compile Heart		
2022	Gnosia	WIN				Petit Depotto	Playism		
2022	Goddess of Victory: Nikke	iOS, DROID				Shift Up	Level Infinite		
2022	Godfall: Ultimate Edition	WIN, PS4, PS5, XBO, XBX/S		Action RPG		Counterplay Games	Gearbox Publishing		
2022	Gotham Knights	WIN, PS5, XBX/S	Original	Action RPG		WB Games Montréal	Warner Bros. Interactive Entertainment		
2022	Grime	PS4, PS5, XBO, XBX/S				Clover Bite	Akupara Games		
2022	Guild Wars 2: End of Dragons	WIN		MMORPG		ArenaNet	NCSoft		
2022 (JP)	Hakoniwa Bokujou Hitsuji Mura	NS				Success			
2022	Harvestella	WIN, NS				Square Enix			
2022 (JP)	Heaven Burns Red	iOS, DROID, WIN				Key, WFS			
2022	Hellpoint	PS5, XBX/S		Action RPG		Cradle Games	tinyBuild		
2022 (WW)	Horizon Forbidden West	WIN, PS4	Original	Tactical RPG	Post-apocalyptic, Sci-fi	Guerrilla Games	Sony Interactive Entertainment	NL	
2022 (JP)	Hyperdimension Neptunia: Sisters vs. Sisters	PS4, PS5				Compile Heart			
2022	I Was a Teenage Exocolonist	WIN, OSX, LIN, NS, PS4, PS5				Northway Games	Finji		
2022 (JP)	Infinity Souls	iOS, DROID				Clover Lab, Seven Arcs	Aniplex		
2022	Jack Move	NS, PS4, XBO, WIN				So Romantic	HypeTrain Digital		
2022 (JP)	Kemono Friends 3	PS4				Appirits			
2022 (WW)	King Arthur: Knight's Tale	WIN	Original	Tactical RPG	Dark fantasy	NeocoreGames		HU	
2022	Kingdom Hearts Integrum Masterpiece for Cloud	NS		Action RPG		Square Enix			
2022 (JP)	Knights in the Nightmare Remaster	NS				Sting Entertainment			
2022 (JP)	KonoSuba: God's Blessing on this Wonderful World! Cursed Relic and the Perplexed Adventurers	NS, PS4				Entergram			
2022	Kowloon High-School Chronicle	NA/EU: PS4; WW: WIN		Dungeon crawl		Toybox Inc.	Arc System Works		
2022 (JP)	Labyrinth of Zangetsu	WIN, NS, PS4				KaeruPanda	Acquire		
2022	The Last Oricru	WIN, PS5, XBX/S		Action RPG		GoldKnights	Prime Matter		
2022 (JP)	The Legend of Heroes: Kuro no Kiseki II -CRIMSON SiN-	PS4, PS5				Nihon Falcom			
2022	The Legend of Heroes: Trails from Zero	WIN, NS, PS4				Nihon Falcom	NIS America		
2022 (JP)	The Legend of Nayuta: Boundless Trails	NS		Action RPG		PH3 GmbH	Nippon Ichi Software		
2022	Little Witch Nobeta	WIN, NS, PS4		Soulslike		Pupuya Games, SimonCreative	Justdan International		
2022	Live A Live	NS				Square Enix	JP: Square Enix; WW: Nintendo		
2022	The Lord of the Rings Online: Before the Shadow	WIN		MMORPG		Standing Stone Games	Daybreak Game Company		
2022	Lost Ark	WIN		MMORPG		Smilegate	Amazon Games		
2022	Lost Eidolons	WIN		Tactical RPG		Ocean Drive Studio			
2022	Lost Epic	WIN, PS4, PS5		Action RPG		Team Earth Wars	One or Eight		
2022 (WW)	Made in Abyss: Binary Star Falling into Darkness	WIN, NS, PS4		Action RPG		Chime Corporation	Spike Chunsoft		
2022	Maglam Lord	NS, PS4		Action RPG		Felistella	PQube		
2022	Mary Skelter 2	WIN		Dungeon crawl		Compile Heart	Ghostlight		
2022 (JP)	Megaton Musashi X	NS, PS4, PS5		Action RPG		Level-5			
2022	Metal Max Xeno Reborn	WIN, NS, PS4				24Frame, Cattle Call, Kadokawa Games	PQube		
2022 (EU/NA)	Monark	WIN, NS, PS4, PS5				Lancarse	NIS America		
2022	Monochrome Mobius: Rights and Wrongs Forgotten	JP: PS4, PS5; WW: WIN				Aquaplus	JP: Aquaplus; WW: Shiravune		
2022	Monster Crown	PS4, XBO				Aurum	Soedesco		
2022	Monster Hunter Rise	WIN		Action RPG		Capcom			
2022	Monster Hunter Rise: Sunbreak	WIN, NS		Action RPG		Capcom			
2022 (JP)	Monster Menu: The Scavenger's Cookbook	NS, PS4		Tactical RPG		Nippon Ichi Software			
2022	Mortal Shell: Complete Edition	NS		Action RPG		Cold Symmetry	Playstack		
2022 (WW)	Mount & Blade II: Bannerlord	WIN, PS4, PS5, XBO, XBX/S	Original	Action RPG	Historical	TaleWorlds Entertainment	Prime Matter	TR	
2022	My Hero: Ultra Impact	iOS, DROID		Action RPG		Bandai Namco Entertainment			
2022 (WW)	Neptuna x Senran Kagura: Ninja Wars	NS, WIN				Idea Factory, Compile Heart, Tamsoft	JP: Compile Heat; WW: Idea Factory		
2022	Nexomon + Nexomon: Extinction: Complete Collection	NS, PS4, XBO				VEWO Interactive	PQube		·
2022	Ni no Kuni: Cross Worlds	iOS, DROID, WIN				Netmarble	Level-5		
2022	Nier: Automata The End of Yorha Edition	NS		Action RPG		Virtuos	Square Enix		
2022	No Place for Bravery	WIN, NS		Action RPG		Glitch Factory	Ysbyrd Games		
2022	Nobody Saves the World	NS, PS4, PS5, WIN, XBO, XBX/S		Action RPG		Drinkbox Studios			
2022	Octopath Traveler: Champions of the Continent	iOS, DROID				Square Enix, Acquire	Square Enix		
2022	Omori	NS, XBO, XBX/S, PS4				Omocat LLC	Playism		
2022	The Outbound Ghost	NS, PS4, PS5, WIN				Conradical Games	Digerati		
2022	Outriders Worldslayer	WIN, PS4, PS5, XBO, XBX/S, Stadia		Action RPG		People Can Fly	Square Enix		
2022	Outward: Definitive Edition	WIN, PS5, XBX/S				Nine Dots	Prime Matter		
2022	Pascal's Wager: Definitive Edition	NS		Action RPG		TipsWorks	Yooreka Studio		
2022	Pathfinder: Wrath of the Righteous	NS, PS4, XBO				Owlcat Games	Prime Matter		
2022	Persona 5 Royal	WIN, NS, PS5, XBO, XBX/S				Atlus	Atlus USA		
2022	Phantasy Star Online 2	PS4		Action RPG, MMORPG		Sega Online R&D	Sega		
2022	Phantasy Star Online 2: New Genesis	PS4		Action RPG, MMORPG		Sega Online R&D	Sega		
2022	Pokémon Legends: Arceus	NS		Action RPG, Monster tamer		Game Freak	The Pokémon Company, Nintendo		
2022	Pokémon Scarlet and Violet	NS		Monster tamer		Game Freak	The Pokémon Company, Nintendo		
2022	Potion Permit	WIN, NS, PS4, PS5, XBO, XBX/S				MassHive Media	PQube		
2022 (EU/NA)	Prinny Presents NIS Classics Volume 2	WIN, NS		Tactical RPG		Nippon Ichi Software			
2022 (EU/NA)	Prinny Presents NIS Classics Volume 3	WIN, NS		Tactical RPG		Nippon Ichi Software			
2022	Puzzle & Dragons Nintendo Switch Edition	NS				GungHo Online Entertainment			
2022	Puzzle Quest 3	WIN, iOS, DROID				Infinity Plus Two	505 Games		
2022	Re:Legend	WIN				Magnus Games Studio	505 Games		
2022	Record of Lodoss War: Deedlit in Wonder Labyrinth	NS		Action RPG		Team Ladybug, WSS Playground	Playism, WSS Playground		
2022	Relayer	PS4, PS5		Tactical RPG		Kadokawa Games	JP: Kadokawa Games; WW: Clouded Leopard Entertainment		
2022	Relayer Advanced	WIN		Tactical RPG		Kadokawa Games	Dragami Games		
2022	Reverie Knights Tactics	WIN, OSX, LIN, PS4, XBO		Tactical RPG		40 Giants Entertainment	1C Entertainment		
2022	RimWorld Console Edition	PS4, XBO		Action RPG		Double Eleven			
2022	Roadwarden	WIN, OSX, LIN				Moral Anxiety Studio	Assemble Entertainment		
2022	Romancing SaGa: Minstrel Song Remastered	WIN, NS, PS4, PS5, iOS, DROID				Square Enix			
2022	RPG Time: The Legend of Wright	NS, PS4				DeskWorks!	Aniplex		
2022	RPGolf Legends	WIN, NS, PS4, PS5, XBO		Action RPG		ArticNet	Kemco		
2022	Ruinsmagus	WIN		Action RPG		CharacterBank	CharacterBank, Mastiff		
2022 (EU/NA)	Rune Factory 5	NS, WIN				Hakama	NA: Xseed Games; EU: Marvelous		
2022	Salt and Sacrifice	WIN, PS4, PS5		Action RPG		Ska Studios			
2022	SD Gundam Battle Alliance	WIN, NS, PS4, PS5, XBO, XBX/S		Action RPG		Artdink	Bandai Namco Entertainment		
2022	Seven Pirates H	NS				Felistella	eastasiasoft		
2022	Shadow Madness	WIN				Crave	Piko Interactive, Bleem!		
2022	Shadowrun Trilogy	NS, PS4, PS5, XBO, XBX/S		Tactical RPG		Harebrained Schemes	Paradox Interactive		
2022	Shadows Over Loathing	WIN, OSX				Asymmetric Publications			
2022	Shining Force II	NS		Tactical RPG					
2022 (JP)	Shiren the Wanderer: The Tower of Fortune and the Dice of Fate	iOS, DROID		Roguelike		Spike Chunsoft			
2022	Soccer Story	WIN, NS, PS4, PS5, XBO, XBX/S, Stadia				PanicBarn	No More Robots		
2022 (WW)	Soul Hackers 2	WIN, PS4, PS5, XBO, XBX/S				Atlus			
2022	Souldiers	WIN, NS, PS4, PS5, XBO, XBX/S		Action RPG		Retro Forge	Dear Villagers		
2022	Soundfall	WIN, NS, PS4, PS5, XBO, XBX/S		Looter shooter		Drastic Games	Noodlecake Studios		
2022	SpellForce 3 Reforced	PS4, PS5, XBO, XBX/S				Grimlore Games	THQ Nordic		
2022	Star Ocean: The Divine Force	WIN, PS4, PS5, XBO, XBX/S		Action RPG		Tri-Ace	Square Enix		
2022	Star Wars Knights of the Old Republic II: The Sith Lords	NS				Obsidian Entertainment	LucasArts		
2022	Star Wars: The Old Republic: Legacy of the Sith	WIN		MMORPG		BioWare Austin	Electronic Arts		
2022	Steelrising	WIN, PS5, XBX/S		Action RPG, Soulslike		Spiders	Nacon		
2022 (EU/NA)	Story of Seasons: Pioneers of Olive Town	PS4				Marvelous Interactive	Xseed Games		
2022	Stranger of Paradise: Final Fantasy Origin	WIN, PS4, PS5, XBO, XBX/S		Action RPG		Team Ninja	Square Enix		
2022	Sunday Gold	WIN				BKOM Studios	Team17		
2022	Super Lesbian Animal RPG	WIN				ponett			
2022	Sword and Fairy: Together Forever	PS4, PS5, XBO, XBX/S		Action RPG		Softstar	eastasiasoft, E-Home Entertainment		
2022 (WW)	Sword Art Online: Alicization Lycoris	NS		Action RPG		Aquria	Bandai Namco Entertainment		
2022	Sword of the Vagrant	NS, PS4, XBO		Action RPG		O.T.K. Games	Rainy Frog		
2022	Symphony of War: The Nephilim Saga	WIN				Dancing Dragon Games	Freedom Games		
2022	Tactics Ogre: Reborn	WIN, NS, PS4, PS5		Tactical RPG		Square Enix			
2022	Tails Noir	NS				EggNut	Raw Fury		
2022	Temtem	WIN, NS, PS5, XBX/S		MMORPG		Crema	Humble Bundle		
2022	This Way Madness Lies	WIN				Zeboyd Games			
2022 (WW)	Thymesia	WIN, NS, PS5, XBX/S	Original	Action RPG	Fantasy	OverBorder Studio	Team17	TW	
2022	Tiny Tina's Wonderlands	WIN, PS4, PS5, XBO, XBX/S		Action RPG		Gearbox Software	2K Games		
2022	Touhou Shoujo: Tale of Beautiful Memories	NS		Action RPG		The N Main Shop	Mediascape		
2022	Tower of Fantasy	WIN, iOS, DROID				Hotta Studio	Level Infinite		
2022 (WW)	Triangle Strategy	NS, WIN	Original	Tactical RPG	Fantasy	Artdink, Netchubiyori	JP: Square Enix; WW: Nintendo	JP	
2022	Tribes of Midgard	NS, XBO, XBX/S		Action RPG		Norsfell Games	Gearbox Publishing		
2022 (JP)	Trinity Trigger	NS, PS4, PS5		Action RPG		Three Rings	FuRyu		
2022	Ultra Kaiju Monster Rancher	NS				Koei Tecmo	Bandai Namco Entertainment		
2022	Undecember	WIN, iOS, DROID		Action RPG		Needs Games	Line Games Corporation		
2022	Undernauts: Labyrinth of Yomi	PS5		Dungeon crawl		Experience	Aksys Games		
2022	Unexplored 2: The Wayfarer's Legacy	WIN, XBO, XBX/S				Ludomotion	Big Sugar		
2022	Valkyrie Elysium	PS4, PS5, WIN		Action RPG		Soleil	Square Enix		
2022	Valkyrie Profile: Lenneth	PS4, PS5				tri-Ace	Square Enix		
2022	Vampire: The Masquerade – Swansong	WIN, NS, PS4, PS5, XBO, XBX/S				Big Bad Wolf	Nacon		
2022	Vanaris Tactics	WIN		Tactical RPG		Matheus Reis	Toge Productions		
2022	Vestaria Saga II: The Sacred Sword of Silvanister	WIN		Tactical RPG		Vestaria Project	Dangen Entertainment		
2022	Voice of Cards: The Beasts of Burden	WIN, NS, PS4				Alim	Square Enix		
2022	Voice of Cards: The Forsaken Maiden	WIN, NS, PS4				Alim	Square Enix		
2022 (JP)	Void Terrarium 2	NS, PS4		Roguelike, Action RPG		Nippon Ichi Software			
2022	The Waylanders	WIN				Gato Studio			
2022	Weird West	WIN, PS4, XBO		Action RPG		WolfEye Studios	Devolver Digital		
2022	Wildcat Gun Machine	WIN, NS, PS4, XBO		Dungeon crawl		Chunkybox Games	Daedalic Entertainment		
2022	The Witch's House MV	NS, PS4, XBO				Fummy	Dangen Entertainment		
2022	The Witcher 3: Wild Hunt	PS5, XBX/S		Action RPG		CD Projekt Red			
2022	Wolfstride	NS				OTA IMON Studio	Raw Fury		
2022	Wonder Boy Collection	NS, PS4		Action RPG		Bliss Brain	ININ Games		
2022	World of Warcraft: Dragonflight	WIN, OSX		MMORPG		Blizzard Entertainment			
2022	Worth Life	NS				Hakama			
2022	Xenoblade Chronicles 3	NS		Action RPG		Monolith Soft	Nintendo		
2022 (EU/NA)	Ys VIII: Lacrimosa of Dana	PS5		Action RPG		Nihon Falcom	NIS America		
2023	8-Bit Adventures 2	WIN				Critical Games			
2023	Abomi Nation	NS, XBO, XBX/S		Monster tamer		Orange Pylon Games	DANGEN Entertainment		
2023	Achilles: Legends Untold	WIN, PS5, XBX/S		Action RPG		Dark Point Games			
2023	Affogato	WIN				Befun Studio	Spiral Up Games		
2023	Alchemic Cutie	NS, PS4, PS5				Viridian Software, Vakio	PM Studios		
2023	Another Crusade	WIN, NS, PS4, PS5, XBO, XBX/S				Dragon Vein Studios	Limited Run Games		
2023	Arcadian Atlas	WIN		Tactical RPG		Twin Otter Studios	Serenity Forge		
2023	Asgard's Wrath 2	Quest		Action RPG		Sanzaru Games	Oculus Studios		
2023	Astlibra Revision	NS		Action RPG		KEIZO	WhisperGames		
2023	Atelier Marie: The Alchemist of Salburg – Remake	WIN, NS, PS4, PS5				Gust	Koei Tecmo		
2023 (JP)	Atelier Resleriana: Forgotten Alchemy and the Polar Night Liberator	iOS, DROID				Gust	Koei Tecmo, Akatsuki Games		
2023 (JP)	Atelier Ryza 3: Alchemist of the End & the Secret Key	WIN, NS, PS4, PS5				Gust	Koei Tecmo		
2023	Atlas Fallen	WIN, PS5, XBX/S		Action RPG		Deck13 Interactive	Focus Entertainment		
2023	Atomic Heart	WIN, PS4, PS5, XBO, XBX/S		Action RPG		Mundfish	Focus Entertainment		
2023	Avatar Generations	iOS, DROID				Navigation Games	CDE Entertainment		
2023 (WW)	Baldur's Gate 3	OSX, PS5, WIN, XBX/S	Original	Turn-based RPG	Fantasy	Larian Studios		BE	
2023	Baldur's Gate: Dark Alliance	iOS, DROID		Action RPG		Interplay Entertainment			
2023	Banchou Tactics	WIN		Tactical RPG		Secret Character, Itsaraamata	Flyhigh Works		
2023	Barotrauma	WIN				Undertow Games, Fakefish Games	Daedalic Entertainment		
2023	Baten Kaitos I & II HD Remaster	NS				Monolith Soft	Bandai Namco Entertainment		
2023	Black Clover M: Rise of the Wizard King	iOS, DROID				Vic Game Studios	Garena		
2023	Bleak Faith: Forsaken	WIN		Action RPG		Archangel Studios			
2023 (JP)	Blue Protocol	WIN		Action RPG		Bandai Namco Online	Amazon Games		
2023	Born of Bread	WIN, NS, PS5, XBX/S		Action RPG		Wild Arts	Dear Villagers		
2023 (WW)	The Caligula Effect 2	PS5				historia	JP: FuRyu; WW: NIS America		
2023 (WW)	The Caligula Effect: Overdose	PS5				historia	JP: FuRyu; WW: NIS America		
2023	Cassette Beasts	NS, XBO, XBX/S, WIN				Bytten Studio	Raw Fury		
2023	Cattails: Wildwood Story	NS				Falcon Development			
2023	Citizen Sleeper	PS4, PS5				Jump Over the Age	Fellow Traveller		
2023	Clash: Artifacts of Chaos	WIN, PS4, PS5, XBO, XBX/S		Action RPG		ACE Team	Nacon		
2023 (CN)	Cookie Run: Kingdom	iOS, DROID, WIN		Action RPG		Devsisters, Tencent Games			
2023	Cross Tails	WIN, NS, PS4, PS5, XBO, XBX/S				RideonJapan	Kemco		
2023 (WW)	Crymachina	NS, PS4, PS5		Action RPG		Aquria	JP: FuRyu; WW: NIS America		
2023	Dark Envoy	WIN				Event Horizon	Twin Sails Interactive		
2023	Darkest Dungeon II	WIN		Dungeon crawl, Roguelike		Red Hook Studios			
2023	Dead Island 2	WIN, PS4, PS5, XBO, XBX/S		Action RPG		Dambuster Studios	Deep Silver		
2023	Demeo	PS5				Resolution Games			
2023 (WW)	Diablo IV	WIN, PS4, PS5, XBO, XBX/S	Original	Action RPG	Fantasy	Blizzard Entertainment		US	
2023	Digimon World: Next Order	WIN, NS				B.B. Studio	Bandai Namco Entertainment		
2023 (WW)	Disgaea 7: Vows of the Virtueless	WIN, NS, PS4, PS5		Tactical RPG		Nippon Ichi Software	OC: NIS America; WW: Nippon Ichi Software		
2023 (WW)	Dokapon Kingdom: Connect	NS, WIN				Sting	JP: Compile Heart; WW: Idea Factory		
2023	Dragon Ball Z: Kakarot	PS5, XBX/S		Action RPG		CyberConnect2	Bandai Namco Entertainment		
2023 (JP)	Dragon Quest Champions	iOS, DROID				Omega Force	Square Enix		
2023	Dragon Quest Monsters: The Dark Prince	NS				Tose	Square Enix		
2023	Dragon Quest Treasures	WIN		Action RPG		Tose	Square Enix		
2023	The Dragoness: Command of the Flame	NS, PS4, PS5, XBX/S		Tactical RPG		Crazy Goat Games	PQube		
2023	Dungeon Drafters	WIN		Roguelike, Dungeon crawl		Manalith Studios	Dangen Entertainment		
2023	Dwerve	NS		Action RPG		Half Human Games			
2023	Eastern Exorcist	NS, PS4, XBO		Action RPG		Wildfire Game	Bilibili		
2023	Etrian Odyssey Origins Collection	WIN, NS				Atlus			
2023	Everhood: Eternity Edition	PS4, PS5, XBO, XBX/S				Foreign Gnomes	Blitworks Games		
2023	Eversoul	DROID, iOS				NINEARK	Kakao Games		
2023	Everspace 2	WIN		Action RPG		Rockfish Games			
2023	Evil Wizard	WIN, XBO, XBX/S		Action RPG		Rubber Duck Games	E-Home Entertainment		
2023	Fae Farm	WIN, NS		Action RPG		Phoenix Labs			
2023	Fairy Fencer F: Refrain Chord	WIN, NS, PS4, PS5		Tactical RPG		Sting Entertainment, Compile Heart	Idea Factory		
2023 (WW)	Fate/Samurai Remnant	WIN, NS, PS4, PS5		Action RPG		Omega Force, Kou Shibusawa	Koei Tecmo		
2023	Final Fantasy Pixel Remaster	NS, PS4				Square Enix			
2023	Final Fantasy VII: Ever Crisis	iOS, DROID, WIN		Action RPG		Applibot, Square Enix	Square Enix		
2023	Final Fantasy XVI	PS5		Action RPG		Square Enix			
2023	Fire Emblem	NS		Tactical RPG					
2023	Fire Emblem Engage	NS		Tactical RPG		Intelligent Systems	Nintendo		
2023 (JP)	Fire Emblem: Fūin no Tsurugi	NS		Tactical RPG					
2023	For the King II	WIN		Roguelike		IronOak Games	Curve Games		
2023	Forspoken	WIN, PS5		Action RPG		Luminous Productions	Square Enix		
2023	Front Mission 1st: Remake	WIN, PS4, PS5, XBO, XBX/S		Tactical RPG		MegaPixel Studio	Forever Entertainment		
2023	Front Mission 2: Remake	NS		Tactical RPG		Storm Trident	Forever Entertainment		
2023	Fuga: Melodies of Steel 2	WIN, NS, PS4, PS5, XBO, XBX/S		Tactical RPG		CyberConnect2			
2023 (JP)	G-Mode Archives+: Megami Ibunroku Persona: Ikū no Tō-hen	NS, WIN		Dungeon crawl		Atlus	G-Mode		
2023	Gloomhaven	NS, PS4, PS5, XBO, XBX/S		Tactical RPG		Flaming Fowl Studios, Saber Interactive	Twin Sails Interactive		
2023	Gnosia	PS4, PS5, XBO, XBX/S				Petit Depotto	Playism		
2023	Goddess of Victory: Nikke	WIN		Action RPG		Shift Up	Level Infinite		
2023	Gothic Classic	NS		Action RPG		Piranha Bytes	THQ Nordic		
2023	Gothic II Complete Classic	NS		Action RPG		Piranha Bytes	THQ Nordic		
2023	Great Ambition of the SLIMES	NS, WIN		Tactical RPG		Altair Works	Flyhigh Works		
2023	Hammerwatch 2	NS, PS5, WIN		Action RPG		Crackshell	Modus Games		
2023 (WW)	Hogwarts Legacy	NS, PS4, PS5, XBO, XBX/S, WIN	Original	Action RPG	Fantasy	Avalanche Software	Warner Bros. Games	US	
2023	Honkai: Star Rail	PS5, WIN, iOS, DROID				HoYoverse			
2023 (WW)	Hyperdimension Neptunia: Sisters vs. Sisters	JP: NS; WW: WIN, PS4, PS5				Compile Heart	JP: Compile Heart; WW: Idea Factory		
2023 (WW)	In Stars and Time	WIN, NS, PS4, PS5	Original	Turn-based RPG	Fantasy	insertdisc5	Armor Games Studios	CA	
2023	Infinity Strash: Dragon Quest The Adventure of Dai	WIN, NS, PS4, PS5, XBX/S		Action RPG		Game Studio, Kai Graphics	Square Enix		
2023	Iron Danger	PS5, XBX/S		Action RPG		Action Squad Studios	Daedalic Entertainment		
2023 (WW)	The Iron Oath	WIN, OSX, LIN	Original	Tactical RPG	Dark fantasy	Curious Panda Games	Humble Games	US	
2023 (WW)	Jagged Alliance 3	WIN, PS4, PS5, XBO, XBX/S	Original	Tactical RPG	Modern	Haemimont Games	THQ Nordic	BG	
2023	Jujutsu Kaisen: Phantom Parade	OSX, iOS, DROID		Action RPG		Sumzap			
2023	Killsquad	PS4, PS5		Action RPG		Novarama			
2023	King's Bounty II	PS5, XBX/S				Fulqrum Games	Prime Matter		
2023	Knight vs Giant: The Broken Excalibur	WIN, NS, PS5, XBX/S		Roguelike, Action RPG		Gambir Studio	PQube		
2023	Labyrinth of Galleria: The Moon Society	WIN, NS, PS4, PS5		Action RPG		Nippon Ichi Software			
2023	Labyrinth of Zangetsu	WIN, NS, PS4		Dungeon crawl		KaeruPanda	PQube		
2023	Landstalker	NS							
2023	The Last Spell	WIN, NS, PS4, PS5				Ishtar Games	The Arcade Crew		
2023	The Legend of Heroes: Trails into Reverie	WIN, NS, PS4, PS5				Nihon Falcom	NIS America		
2023 (WW)	The Legend of Heroes: Trails to Azure	WIN, NS, PS4				Nihon Falcom	NIS America		
2023 (WW)	The Legend of Nayuta: Boundless Trails	WIN, NS, PS4		Action RPG		Nihon Falcom	NIS America		
2023 (WW)	Lies of P	WIN, PS4, PS5, XBO, XBX/S	Original	Action RPG, Soulslike	Modern	Round8 Studio	Neowiz	KR	
2023	Lisa: Definitive Edition	WIN, NS, PS4, PS5, XBO, XBX/S				Dingaling Productions	Serenity Forge		
2023	Little Goody Two Shoes	WIN, NS, PS5, XBX/S				AstralShift	Square Enix Collective		
2023	Live A Live	WIN, PS4, PS5				Historia	Square Enix		
2023	Long Gone Days	WIN, NS, PS4, PS5, XBO, XBX/S				This I Dreamt	Serenity Forge		
2023 (WW)	Loop8: Summer of Gods	WIN, NS, PS4, XBO				Sieg Games	Marvelous		
2023	The Lord of the Rings: Heroes of Middle-earth	iOS, DROID				Capital Games	Electronic Arts		
2023	Lords of the Fallen	WIN, PS5, XBX/S		Action RPG		Hexworks	CI Games		
2023	Lost Eidolons	PS5, XBX/S		Tactical RPG		Ocean Drive Studio			
2023	Mario & Luigi: Superstar Saga	NS	Port			AlphaDream	Nintendo		
2023	Mary Skelter Finale	WIN		Dungeon crawl		Compile Heart	Idea Factory		
2023	Mato Anomalies	WIN, NS, PS4, PS5, XBO, XBX/S				Arrowiz	Prime Matter		
2023	Meg's Monster	WIN, NS, XBO, XBX/S				Odencat			
2023	Mega Man Battle Network Legacy Collection	WIN, NS, PS4				Capcom			
2023	Mega Man X DiVE Offline	WIN, iOS, DROID		Action RPG		Capcom			
2023 (WW)	Mercenaries Lament: The Seven Stars of the Silver Wolf and Shrine Maiden	NS, PS4, PS5		Tactical RPG		RideonJapan, Esquadra	JP: RideonJapan; WW: Circle Entertainment, Flyhigh Works		
2023	Miasma Chronicles	WIN, PS5, XBX/S		Tactical RPG		The Bearded Ladies	505 Games		
2023	Might & Magic: Clash of Heroes - Definitive Edition	WIN, NS, PS4				Dotemu			
2023	Mighty Quest Rogue Palace	iOS, DROID		Roguelike, Dungeon crawl		Ubisoft	Netflix Games		
2023	Mon-Yu	WIN, NS, PS5		Dungeon crawl		Experience	Aksys Games		
2023 (WW)	Monochrome Mobius: Rights and Wrongs Forgotten	PS4, PS5				Aquaplus, Design Act	NIS America		
2023	Monster Hunter Now	iOS, DROID		Action RPG		Niantic	Capcom		
2023	Monster Hunter Rise	PS4, PS5, XBO, XBX/S		Action RPG		Capcom			
2023	Monster Menu: The Scavenger's Cookbook	NS, PS4, PS5				Nippon Ichi Software	WW: NIS America; EU: Nippon Ichi Software		
2023	Mortal Kombat: Onslaught	iOS, DROID				NetherRealm Studios	Warner Bros. Games		
2023	Mugen Souls	NS				Compile Heart	Eastasiasoft		
2023	Mugen Souls Z	NS				Compile Heart	eastasiasoft		
2023	My Time at Sandrock	WIN, NS, PS4, PS5, XBO, XBX/S		Action RPG		Pathea Games	PM Studios		
2023	MythForce	WIN, NS, PS4, PS5, XBO, XBX/S		Action RPG		Beamdog	Aspyr		
2023 (JP)	Neptunia Game Maker R:Evolution	NS, PS4, PS5				Compile Heart			
2023	Ni no Kuni II: Revenant Kingdom	XBO, XBX/S				Level-5	Bandai Namco Entertainment		
2023	Noob: The Factionless	WIN, NS, PS4, PS5, XBO, XBX/S				Olydri Games	Microids		
2023	Oceanhorn 2: Knights of the Lost Realm	WIN, PS5, XBX/S		Action RPG		Comfox & Bros	Fireplace Games		
2023 (WW)	Octopath Traveler II	WIN, NS, PS4, PS5	Original	JRPG	Fantasy	Acquire, Square Enix	Square Enix	JP	
2023	One Piece Odyssey	WIN, PS4, PS5, XBX/S				ILCA	Bandai Namco Entertainment		
2023	The Outer Worlds: Spacer's Choice Edition	PS5, XBX/S		Action RPG		Obsidian Entertainment	Private Division		
2023	The Pale Beyond	WIN, OSX				Bellular Studios	Fellow Traveller		
2023	Persona 3 Portable	WIN, NS, PS4, XBO, XBX/S				Atlus	Sega		
2023	Persona 4 Golden	NS, PS4, XBO, XBX/S				Atlus	Sega		
2023	Persona 5 Tactica	WIN, NS, PS4, PS5, XBO, XBX/S		Tactical RPG		P-Studio	Atlus		
2023	Phantom Blade: Executioners	WIN, PS4, PS5, iOS, DROID		Action RPG		S-GAME			
2023	Pocket Mirror: GoldenerTraum	WIN				AstralShift, Visustella	Degica Games		
2023	Punishing: Gray Raven	WIN		Action RPG		Kuro Games			
2023	Puzzle Quest 3	PS4, PS5, XBO, XBX/S				Infinity Plus Two	505 Games		
2023	Quest for Camelot	NS		Action RPG					
2023	Rainbow Skies	NS				SideQuest Studios	eastasiasoft		
2023	Ravenbound	WIN		Action RPG, Roguelike		Systemic Reaction			
2023 (JP)	Rear Sekai	NS		Action RPG		Hakama	Bushiroad		
2023	Record of Agarest War	NS		Tactical RPG		Compile Heart	Aksys Games		
2023	Redemption Reapers	WIN, NS, PS4				Adglobe	Binary Haze Interactive		
2023	Remnant: From the Ashes	NS		Action RPG		Gunfire Games	Perfect World Entertainment		
2023	Reverse: 1999	WIN, DROID, iOS				Bluepoch			
2023 (WW)	Rhapsody: Marl Kingdom Chronicles	WIN, NS, PS5				Nippon Ichi Software			
2023	Risen	NS, PS4, XBO		Action RPG		Piranha Bytes	THQ Nordic		
2023	Romancelvania	WIN, PS5, XBX/S		Action RPG		The Deep End Games	2124 Publishing		
2023	Roots of Pacha	NS, PS4, PS5, WIN, OSX, LIN				Soda Den			
2023 (WW)	Rune Factory 3 Special	WIN, NS				Marvelous	JP: Marvelous; WW: Xseed Games		
2023	Sailing Era	NS, PS4, PS5, WIN				Gy Games	Bilibili		
2023	Salt and Sacrifice	NS		Action RPG		Ska Studios, Devoured Studios	Ska Studios		
2023 (WW)	Sea of Stars	WIN, NS, PS4, PS5, XBO, XBX/S	Original	Turn-based RPG	Fantasy	Sabotage Studio		CA	
2023	Shovel Knight Pocket Dungeon	iOS, DROID		Dungeon crawl		Yacht Club Games	Netflix Games		
2023 (WW)	Silent Hope	WIN, NS		Action RPG		Marvelous	Marvelous, Xseed Games		
2023	Small Saga	WIN, OSX				Jeremy Noghani			
2023	Souls of Chronos	WIN, NS, PS5				Astrolabe Games	Futu Studio		
2023	Soulvars	WIN, NS, PS4, PS5, XBO, XBX/S				ginolabo	Shueisha Games		
2023 (WW)	Space Wreck	WIN	Original	Turn-based RPG	Sci-fi	Pahris Entertainment		LV	
2023	SpellForce: Conquest of Eo	WIN		Tactical RPG		Owned by Gravity	THQ Nordic		
2023	Spirit of the Island	NS, PS4, PS5, XBO, XBX/S				1 Million Bits Horde	PID Games, Meta Publishing		
2023	Star Ocean: The Second Story R	WIN, NS, PS4, PS5		Action RPG		Gemdrops	Square Enix		
2023 (WW)	Starfield	WIN, XBX/S	Original	Action RPG	Sci-fi	Bethesda Game Studios	Bethesda Softworks	US	
2023 (WW)	Story of Seasons: A Wonderful Life	WIN, NS, PS5, XBX/S				Marvelous	JP: Marvelous; WW: Xseed Games		
2023	Stray Blade	WIN, PS5, XBX/S		Action RPG		Point Blank	505 Games		
2023	Stray Gods: The Roleplaying Musical	WIN, NS, PS4, PS5, XBO, XBX/S				Summerfall Studios	Humble Games		
2023	Sun Haven	WIN				Pixel Sprout Studios			
2023	Sunshine Manor	NS, PS4, PS5, XBO, XBX/S				Fossil Games	Hound Picked Games		
2023	Super Mario RPG	NS				ArtePiazza	Nintendo		
2023 (WW)	Sword Art Online: Last Recollection	WIN, PS4, PS5, XBO, XBX/S		Action RPG		Aquria	Bandai Namco Entertainment		
2023	Tails: The Backbone Preludes	WIN				EggNut	Raw Fury		
2023 (WW)	Tales of Symphonia Remastered	NS, PS4, XBO		Action RPG		Bandai Namco Entertainment Romania	Bandai Namco Entertainment		
2023	Tangledeep	PS4		Dungeon crawl		Impact GameWorks			
2023	Temtem: Showdown	WIN				Crema	Humble Games		
2023	Thirsty Suitors	WIN, NS, PS4, PS5, XBO, XBX/S		Action RPG		Outerloop Games	Annapurna Interactive		
2023	This Way Madness Lies	NS				Zeboyd Games			
2023 (KR)	Throne and Liberty	WIN		MMORPG		NCSoft			
2023 (JP)	Tokyo Xanadu eX+	NS		Action RPG		Nihon Falcom			
2023	Torchlight: Infinite	iOS, DROID		Action RPG		XD Games			
2023	Touhou: New World	PS4, PS5, WIN, NS		Action RPG		Ankake Spa	Xseed Games		
2023	Tower of Fantasy	PS4, PS5		Action RPG		Hotta Studio	Perfect World		
2023 (EU/NA)	Trinity Trigger	WIN, NS, PS4, PS5		Action RPG		Three Rings	Xseed Games, Marvelous		
2023	Untamed Tactics	WIN		Tactical RPG		Grumpy Owl Games	Ravenage		
2023	Various Daylife	iOS, DROID				Dokidoki Grooveworks, Square Enix	Square Enix		
2023 (WW)	void tRrLM2(); Void Terrarium 2	NS, PS4		Roguelike, Action RPG		Nippon Ichi Software			
2023	Wandering Sword	WIN				The Swordman Studio	Spiral Up Games		
2023 (WW)	Warhammer 40,000: Rogue Trader	WIN, OSX, PS5, XBX/S	Original	Turn-based RPG	Sci-fi	Owlcat Games		CY	
2023	Wartales	NS, WIN, XBO, XBX/S		Tactical RPG		Shiro Games/Unlimited			
2023	Weird West: Definitive Edition	PS5, XBX/S		Action RPG		WolfEye Studios	Devolver Digital		
2023	What the Duck	WIN, NS				Seize Studios	Untold Tales		
2023	Wild Hearts	WIN, PS5, XBX/S		Action RPG		Omega Force	Electronic Arts		
2023	WitchSpring R	WIN				Kiwi Walks			
2023	Wo Long: Fallen Dynasty	WIN, PS4, PS5, XBO, XBX/S		Action RPG		Team Ninja	Koei Tecmo		
2023	Wolcen: Lords of Mayhem	PS4, XBO		Action RPG		Wolcen Studio			
2023	World of Horror	WIN, NS, PS4, PS5				Panstasz	Ysbyrd Games		
2023	WrestleQuest	WIN, NS, PS4, PS5, XBO, XBX/S, iOS, DROID		Action RPG		Mega Cat Studios	Skybound Games		
2023 (JP)	Xicatrice	NS, PS4, PS5				Nippon Ichi Software			
2023	Xuan-Yuan Sword: Mists Beyond the Mountains	WIN, NS				Softstar	Gamera Games, eastasiasoft		
2023	Yggdra Union: We'll Never Fight Alone	WIN, NS		Tactical RPG		Sting Entertainment			
2023 (JP)	Ys Memoire: The Oath in Felghana	NS		Action RPG		Nihon Falcom			
2023 (JP)	Ys X: Nordics	NS, PS4, PS5		Action RPG		Nihon Falcom			
