= Cosmic Star Heroine =

2017 video game

- Developer: Zeboyd Games
- Publisher: Zeboyd Games
- Composer: HyperDuck SoundWorks
- Engine: Unity
- Platforms: Microsoft Windows; PlayStation 4 PlayStation Vita; Nintendo Switch; Google Stadia
- Release: Windows, PlayStation 4: WW: April 11, 2017; PlayStation Vita: NA: April 24, 2018; EU: June 5, 2018; Nintendo Switch: WW: August 14, 2018; Google Stadia: WW: April 1, 2021
- Genre: Role-playing
- Mode: Single-player

Cosmic Star Heroine is a science fiction role-playing video game by Zeboyd Games. The game's development was funded partially through a Kickstarter campaign. Cosmic Star Heroine was released in April 2017 for the PlayStation 4 and Microsoft Windows platforms; it was later ported in 2018 for PlayStation Vita in April and Nintendo Switch in August. It received a version for Google Stadia in April 2021.

== Gameplay ==
Cosmic Star Heroine is a role-playing game where the player recruits up to 11 playable characters, and chooses a party of four to go into combat with enemies. There are no random battles; combat takes place on the field like in Chrono Trigger, with visible enemies and bosses. These encounters do not respawn, but if a player desires to "grind" for more levels and money, they can start additional battles at any time with as a VR battle, somewhat similar to the ability in Cthulhu Saves the World to force an encounter. Rather than using traditional MP, a unique charge-based system is used. In battle, each character sets up to 7 abilities and a rest/defend type ability; in general, once an ability is used, it cannot be used again until the defend ability is used, which recharges all spent abilities. Additionally, each character has a specific pattern for gaining "Hyper" turns wherein their abilities are drastically more effective. This makes it so that "spamming" the most powerful ability is less effective due to needing to spend a turn resting to recharge it; the gameplay is based around setting up buffs and debuffs, then using powerful abilities on Hyper turns. Status effects also operate on a "reliable" basis, rather than having a percentage chance of success, but enemies also increase status ailment resistance after being inflicted with an ailment. Characters, both PCs and enemies, have a Style gauge that starts at 100% and increases with most actions. Style acts as a multiplier increasing damage done. Style can be lost via near-death and death, as well as certain powerful "Burst" moves that reset Style to 100%. This acts similar to mechanics in earlier games made by Zeboyd that increase the tension and damage dealt the longer a fight persists. The game has four difficulty settings which can freely be changed between in-game; enemies are tougher and deal more damage on the higher difficult settings.

The party can explore 3 planets, which contain both towns and dangerous combat-focused areas. Araenu has a cyberpunk theme, with megacorporations, slums, clubs and secret bases; Rhomu has a wild-west theme, with saloons, casinos, gunslinging, all underground after war devastated the surface; and Nuluup is a green and verdant planet with mysterious astral powers and a large population of reanimated souls of the dead. There is a base upgrading system similar to the one from the Suikoden series, in which NPCs can be recruited to join the starship flagship of Alyssa's force. Some of these NPCs can also offer bonuses and indirect support to the player's party in battle. There are a variety of sidequests as well, optional content the party can pursue for additional plot scenes and equipment.

== Plot ==
The adventure follows Alyssa L'Salle, an agent of the Agency of Peace & Intelligence (API). An API mission to an abandoned research lab on Rhomu comes into contact with a mission from the rival terrorist organization Astrea; the team investigates and finds the incomplete remnants of a "Project Lumina" research project guarded by berserk beasts. Alyssa's allies discover that Project Lumina seems to be the foundation for a mind control device. Director Steele, the head of the API, plans on using Lumina to impose order across the galaxy. Alyssa and her friends defect from the API and seek out the aid of Astrea and its leader, Arete. Steele's faction of the API attempts to perfect Lumina, while Alyssa and Astrea attempt to gain allies and build a counter-device to protect against Lumina's influence. Alyssa steals the API's flagship and makes it her own mobile base to investigate a spate of recent incidents: dark energy monsters roaming loose, kidnappings, and mysterious attacks. Eventually, Alyssa's force defeats Steele, himself driven mad by Lumina's dark influence. The victory is short-lived; Arete is revealed to also have been under the influence of Lumina's true master the whole time, having subtly influenced her followers to join Astrea, and she combines her own essence of the Lumina with the device recovered from Rhomu to resurrect an ancient evil god. Alyssa and her party defeat both Arete and the awoken dark god at its alien starship before they can overwhelm the galaxy.

== Development and release ==
Zeboyd Games officially announced their new upcoming title as Cosmic Star Heroine in June 2013. The game was part funded through a Kickstarter crowdfunding campaign, raising $132,689 towards its development in October of the same year. Zeboyd credited the crowdfunding success to the timing of the campaign and the careful selection of the backer rewards. The game was inspired by titles such as Chrono Trigger, Phantasy Star IV, Final Fantasy VII, and Mass Effect among others. The game was featured at PlayStation Experience 2015, where the PlayStation Vita version was also playable for the first time.

Cosmic Star Heroine was released for Microsoft Windows and PlayStation 4 on April 11, 2017. The game was largely released via digital distribution, such as PlayStation Network (PSN) and Steam. Limited Run Games made a physical edition of the game for the PlayStation 4 and the PlayStation Vita. In response to bug reports on the initial launch version and in preparation for the Vita version, several patches were released for the PC & PS4 versions. The PlayStation Vita port was released in May 2018, and a Nintendo Switch port in August. A port for Google Stadia was released on April 1, 2021.

The soundtrack to the game was produced by HyperDuck SoundWorks, who also composed the music to Dust: An Elysian Tail.

== Reception ==
Reception

Aggregate scores
Aggregator	Score
GameRankings	77.17%
Metacritic	PS4: 76/100; PC: 77/100

Review scores
Publication	Score
Destructoid	7.5/10
GameSpot	6/10
RPGFan	83/100
RPGSite	8.5/10

Cosmic Star Heroine received "generally favorable reviews" according to the review aggregation website Metacritic, while on Gamerankings it has 77%. Critics praised the combat system, retro graphics, and the soundtrack, but they found the story rushed, the characters underdeveloped, and the game still containing various unfixed technical issues at launch.

The game was nominated for "Game, Original Role Playing" at the National Academy of Video Game Trade Reviewers Awards.

A 2021 retrospective by Kurt Kalata largely echoed the contemporary reviews. He praised the battle system, calling it the best part of the game, as well as the general aesthetic of the graphics and the soundtrack. He also thought the story had tone issues and that the characters were underdeveloped and uninteresting. The review noted that the game remained the "most ambitious" work Zeboyd had produced, and that it set itself apart from other indie SNES JRPG tributes.
