= Centum (disambiguation) =

Centum denotes a class within the Indo-European language family, distinguished from the satem languages.

Centum may also refer to:

- Jalaa language, or Cèntûm, an endangered language isolate of Nigeria
- Centum Investments, an East African investment company
- Centum, a 2025 video game.
