= Lifeless Planet =

2014 video game

- European Microsoft Windows box art
- Developer: Stage 2 Studios
- Publishers: Lace Games (PC); Serenity Forge (PS4, Switch); Stage 2 Studios (XB1)
- Designer: David Board
- Composer: Rich Douglas
- Engine: Unity
- Platforms: Windows, OS X, Xbox One, PlayStation 4, Linux, Switch
- Release: Microsoft Windows; June 6, 2014; OS X June 23, 2014; Xbox One; May 13, 2015; Linux; March 25, 2016; PlayStation 4 July 19, 2016; Nintendo Switch; September 6, 2018
- Genres: Adventure, puzzle
- Mode: Single-player

Lifeless Planet is a 2014 puzzle adventure game developed by independent American company Stage 2 Studios and published by Serenity Forge. The game was released on June 6, 2014 for Microsoft Windows and on June 23, 2014 for OS X, and has been ported to the Xbox One on May 13, 2015, Linux on March 25, 2016 and to the PlayStation 4 on July 19, 2016. A version for Nintendo Switch released on September 6, 2018. Lifeless Planet was in development since 2011 and is primarily the product of the one developer, David Board.

== Plot ==
An astronaut travels to another planet that is thought to be filled with lifeforms. The mission is a failure as the ship is lost in the crash, both of the other crew members are killed, and the planet turns out to be an enormous wasteland seemingly completely devoid of life; however, among the vast emptiness is a derelict Soviet Union science outpost constructed on the planet. The game follows the protagonist as he explores the planet, figures out how the Soviets managed to travel to the planet and why the outpost is now empty, and why the planet is devoid of life. As he explores through the planet, he occasionally receives hallucinations and flashbacks of his life on Earth. As the protagonist makes his way across the planet in search of answers, he finds out he is not alone and the only other survivor is a mysterious Russian woman named Aelita who guides him through the planet's eerie landscape.

Through audio recordings left behind by the Soviet colonists, the protagonist is able to piece together what occurred on the planet. In 1974, the Soviets discovered a portal in Siberia which led them to the planet. The planet was originally filled with bountiful lifeforms, among them a strange type of green moss that acted as the primary energy source for the planet's native lifeforms (which the Soviets adapted as their main source of electricity on the planet). Wanting to use the planet to establish a "new Motherland" for their people, the Soviets kept their discovery a secret as they began colonizing the planet. The entrance portal was eventually discovered to be only one way, constructed in this manner by the planet's previous inhabitants due to the times between the planet and Earth being out of sync (Earth is hundreds of years ahead of the planet). To compensate, the previous inhabitants had constructed a second "exit" portal that led back to Earth, which was discovered by the Soviet colonists and used with the entrance portal to receive resources and new colonists.

However, the Soviets' overuse of the portals and the planet's resources caused the green moss to gradually die out, which led to the portal mutating the remaining lifeforms on the planet to become hostile towards the colonists. The portals themselves also became extremely unstable, and their connection to Earth was eventually severed. While looking for a solution, the Soviet scientists discovered that Aelita, a colonist who had lost both of her children early on in the crisis, had been maintaining a secret garden containing the various plant forms of the planet, among them the now extinct green moss. After observing that Aelita could interact with the plant forms, the desperate scientists experimented on her, injecting her with DNA taken from the plants of the planet. As a result, Aelita transformed into a human-plant hybrid that was able to survive on the planet and influence the growth of its plants. Unfortunately, this was insufficient to prevent the colonists' demise, and all of them were eventually wiped out, leaving Aelita the sole survivor.

After discovering this information, the protagonist is led by Aelita to the heart of the planet, where she sacrifices herself to restore the planet's original life forms. This also has the consequence of repairing the previously unstable portals, allowing the protagonist to leave the planet. As the protagonist makes his way to the exit portal, an interview flashback reveals that he had a wife on Earth. One day, she disappeared, later discovered to have fallen off of a cliff and rendered comatose, with a mysterious green moss growing around her toes by the time she was found by the protagonist. Afterward, she was placed under life support, which served as the reason for the protagonist volunteering to participate in the one-way expedition to the planet in the first place: despite knowing that it would take a long time (if at all) for his wife to recover, he was still unwilling to take her off of life support, as he wanted to give her "every chance to live again, even if [he] wasn't there". Reaching the portal, the protagonist returns to Earth, now hundreds of years into the future. Reflecting on his experiences, the protagonist arrives on a cliff (the same one of which his wife fell off) that overlooks a futuristic city.

== Gameplay ==
The player explores the desolate environment of Lifeless Planet.

The game contains platforming adventure and puzzles to solve. Levels in the game are linear, but their large size allow for limited exploration. The gameplay difficulty increases as the game progresses to match up with the player's skills learned from playing the game.

The game involves various mechanics. Namely, the two most important mechanics are the protagonist's oxygen and jetpack fuel levels. The protagonist must replenish his oxygen using various "Oxygen Supply Vehicles" and oxygen tanks scattered intermittently throughout the game, with each replenishing action granting an extra eight in-game hours of oxygen. The protagonist must also use his jetpack to cover short distances between platforms, with jetpack fuel allowing sustained boosts across larger gaps. Unlike oxygen replenishing sources, jetpack fuel tanks are usually strategically located beside difficult jumps that require more advanced platforming. An additional mechanic is a "mobile grabber arm" that is obtained fairly early on in the game, which allows the protagonist to grab objects and solve puzzles which would otherwise be out of reach.

Puzzles in the game are relatively simple, involving: finding and operating a switch to activate a power source; using dynamite to blow away obstacles; rolling and jumping on moveable rocks to access new areas; transporting green moss power sources to outlets; and pressing buttons in a specific order to open a giant gate (the latter two of which usually involve using the aforementioned mobile grabber arm). The first puzzle of the game involves exploring a small colonist town to find both halves of a passcode that is needed to gain entry into the main Soviet laboratory.

Lore in the game come mainly in the form of audio recordings left behind by the Soviet colonists, which act as the main source of exposition for the game. There are also a very small number of minerals that the protagonist can inspect. When the protagonist inspects a mineral or traverses an area of interest, he will make an entry into his log.

There are no hostile mobs that the protagonist must fight during his journey, but there are still several ways in which he may die. The most common method is falling to death, but the protagonist can also be killed by the planet's mutated plant life (provided he accidentally touches it) or by being incinerated in lava (which is only found in the game's "inferno" level). As such, the protagonist must generally follow the green footsteps whenever he encounters them, as they provide the safest path to take when navigating the planet.

== Development and release ==
The game was originally planned to be an action platformer, but as development of the story expanded, developer David Board chose to refocus the game to center on the story. The game is inspired by classic adventure games including LucasArts's The Dig and the platform game Another World, as well as by Cold War sci-fi B movies. Board said that he aimed for the game to convey the "combined sense of optimism and dread of what science was capable of in the hands of humankind".

The game was part funded through crowdfunding, launching a Kickstarter campaign in September 2011. The campaign achieved its $8,500 target within 24 hours of going live, and eventually closed with over $17,000 raised. The exposure generated by the campaign helped to secure a publishing deal for the game. Though Board originally intended to release the game in July 2012, delays meant it took until March 2014 for just the Steam Early Access release.

The early access release included the first six chapters of the game, approximately one third of the game's content which corresponds to about two hours of gameplay. PC Gamer described that gameplay as "perfunctory", with some puzzle solutions being extremely obvious, a lot of time spent "just walking", and some gameplay elements feeling "contrived". The final version of the game has around 20 chapters and which was released June 6, 2014. It would also include features not present in early access such as support for OS X, subtitles, and the option for Russian or German language. This game is similar to the work of Aleksey Nikolayevich Tolstoy, Aelita.

== Reception ==
Reception

Aggregate score
Aggregator	Score
Metacritic	PC: 59/100; XONE: 57/100; PS4: 60/100; NS: 53/100

Review scores
Publication	Score
Adventure Gamers	3/5
Eurogamer	7/10
Game Informer	7.25/10
GamesRadar+	2/5
Hardcore Gamer	7/10
Nintendo Life	5/10
Nintendo World Report	5/10
PC Gamer (US)	60/100
VideoGamer.com	5/10

Lifeless Planet received "mixed or average" reviews, according to review aggregator Metacritic.

Adventure Gamers praised the game's creative environmental puzzles, novel concept, great music, and strong atmosphere while criticizing the repetitive gameplay, visuals, flat voice acting, poor controls, and technical issues. Eurogamer disliked the title's clunky mechanics, weak puzzles, but thought that "the pure visual storytelling - the pure digital tourism, in fact - that sees this stoical game shine." Game Informer gave it a 7.25 out of 10, writing, "The aspects of Lifeless Planet that succeed elevate it past the technical shortcomings, but only so far. You will find a compelling world and a story worth experiencing, but you do so at the expense of well-polished animation and gameplay that hinders the overall experience." GamesRadar panned the game for its Xbox 360-era visuals, stiff controls, overly simplistic puzzle design, bad writing, and exploration, on which they wrote, "This initially open-looking world blocked us in with linear design and frequent dead ends, mocking our attempts at exploration. There's frequent unintentional back-tracking, because the planet looks so consistently bland..." Nintendo Life gave the game 5 stars out of 10 and concluded that despite its crude looks, disparate gameplay elements, unremarkable platforming and environmental puzzles, there was still an inherent enjoyable quality to the game. PC Gamer and Nintendo World Report liked the music and the narrative but similarly thought unfavorably of the simplistic puzzles, platforming, and static visuals.

== Sequel ==
An spiritual successor, called Lifeless Moon, was released in 2023.
