= Sister Other Paranoia =

2026 visual novel

- Logo of Sister Other Paranoia
- Developer: HazeDenki
- Publisher: Serenity Forge
- Director: nyalra
- Designers: Maruino (UI design); Yuto Hama (Logo design)
- Programmer: HAYAO
- Artist: Ohisashiburi
- Writer: nyalra
- Composer: Aiobahn +81
- Platform: Windows
- Release: August 15, 2026
- Genres: Adventure, Denpa, Visual novel
- Mode: Single-player

Sister Other Paranoia (Note: Japanese: 妹、他者、パラノイア, Hepburn: Imōto, Tasha, Paranoia) is a 2026 denpa-inspired visual novel developed by HazeDenki and published by Serenity Forge. It was released on Steam for Windows on August 15, 2026.

== Plot ==
The protagonist is a light novel writer who, unable to cope with what he perceives as the ugliness of the world and the thoughts of other people, develops the ability to read minds. He withdraws from society and submits a light novel to a newcomer award, which he unexpectedly wins. However, the jealousy and envy surrounding his success further deepen his distrust of other people and strain his remaining relationships.

His younger sister is his only source of comfort. The two, dependent on each other for emotional support, gradually develop a troubled and unhealthy codependent relationship.

As conflicts with other people accumulate, the protagonist can use his mind-reading ability to exploit their insecurities and manipulate them into suicide. The game explores the consequences of these actions, as well as questions surrounding happiness and the future of the protagonist and his sister.

== Gameplay ==
The game's visual-novel interface and artwork.

Sister Other Paranoia uses a classic visual novel format. The player progresses through text that covers the screen and can right-click to hide it and view the background artwork. Depending on the player's choices, the story branches into different narrative routes, with some paths involving the protagonist driving other characters to suicide.

The game combines an unsettling, retro-horror tone with elements of denpa fiction, and follows the daily life of a shut-in who experiences homicidal impulses. A playable demo was made available through HazeDenki's official Discord server ahead of the game's release.

== Characters ==
Hasuya (蓮也)
An up-and-coming light novel writer who becomes increasingly distrustful of people after frequently being exposed to their malice.

Sahana (沙華)
Hasuya's younger sister, who is unable to fit in at school and withdraws from the world. She is the only person with whom Hasuya has formed a close emotional bond.

Igusa (伊草)
Hasuya's only friend, whom he has known since his school days. He develops an inferiority complex toward Hasuya after Hasuya becomes a successful light novel author.

Tenjiku Botan (天竺 牡丹)
A college student and member of the otaku club who contacts Hasuya after his debut as a light novel author. She operates a moderately popular social media account focused on obscure novels and cult films.

Hiyakawa (冷川)
A senior member of the protagonist's literature club who studies philosophy. He is critical of Hasuya's writing and becomes resentful of Hasuya's success as a light novel author, despite being an aspiring writer himself.

== Development ==
The development of Sister Other Paranoia was first announced on December 30, 2025. The game attracted over 10,000 Steam wishlists on its first day after its announcement. nyalra served as director and scenario writer, Ohisashiburi provided the artwork, and Aiobahn +81 composed the music, with several members of the development team behind Needy Streamer Overload returning for the project. HazeDenki developed the game, while Serenity Forge published the game. nyalra stated that his experiences as a shut-in inspired the character of the sister.

== Reception ==
Reception

Aggregate score
Aggregator	Score
Metacritic	64/100

Sister Other Paranoia received "mixed or average" reviews from critics, according to the review aggregation website Metacritic.

John Rafael of NookGaming praised the game's character-driven narrative and its visual presentation, particularly its use of symbolic imagery, artwork, and music. He described the storyline as relatively simplistic and straightforward, while noting that the game's limited length resulted in some of its treatment of mental health issues being one-dimensional. He nevertheless recommended the game, describing it as an interesting and memorable experience.

Davide Fanelli of CrazyGameCommunity praised the game's thematic ambition, visual direction, and presentation, while noting that it was not suitable for everyone. He highlighted its focus on paranoia, social isolation, and the protagonist's internal monologues, as well as its NVL presentation and visual design.
