= Breath of Death VII: The Beginning =

2010 video game

- Cover art that depicts the four protagonists: Sara, Dem, Erik, and Lita
- Developer: Zeboyd Games
- Publisher: Zeboyd Games
- Platforms: Xbox 360, Windows
- Release: April 22, 2010 (XBLA); July 13, 2011 (Windows)
- Genre: Turn-based role-playing game
- Mode: Single-player

Breath of Death VII: The Beginning is an indie turn-based role-playing video game developed and published by Zeboyd Games. It was released on April 22, 2010, for Xbox 360 under the Xbox Live Arcade service, and on July 13, 2011, for Windows. It was later bundled with its spiritual successor, Cthulhu Saves the World, as a compilation pack. Despite the title, the game is standalone and unconnected to any other games. A parody of 8-bit Japanese role-playing games, it takes place in a post-apocalyptic world in which humans have gone extinct. The main character, an undead skeleton knight named Dem, is accompanied by other undead party members in a quest to stop an evil force. Breath of Death was positively received by critics, who commended its gameplay, story and low price, but also called it overly basic and generic. On December 12, 2024, a 16-bit-style remake was released as Breath of Death VII: The Beginning: Reanimated on Steam, developed by Shadow Layer Games.

== Gameplay ==
The player must travel through dungeons, which have random encounters. Battles are first-person and menu-based. Health is fully recovered after battles, while MP must be restored at save points.

Gameplay differences between the game's Xbox Live Arcade and PC versions include being able to remove old equipment from the inventory and save anywhere, not just at save points.

== Plot ==
The game is set in the future, where humanity has gone extinct after a nuclear war. Dem, a silent protagonist who is incapable of speaking, teams up with various other undead party members, including Sara, who can understand him through mind-reading, in order to stop an evil entity.

== Reception ==
Alex Fuller of RPGFan rated the game's PC version 3.5/5 points, particularly commending its battle system as easy-to-use, noting its time limit system in which enemies gain power each turn, and its combo system, allowing party members to join for attacks. David Sanchez of GameZone called it a "highly enjoyable parody adventure", that was short and somewhat generic but still worth playing at its low price. Supernovae of Jeuxvideo.com rated the game 15/20, comparing it heavily to retro games and saying that it was original, humorous and worth the price.
