= Virgo Versus the Zodiac =

- Developer(s): Moonana
- Publisher(s): Degica Games; Serenity Forge
- Engine: GameMaker
- Platform(s): macOS; Windows; Nintendo Switch; PlayStation 4; PlayStation 5; Xbox One; Xbox Series X/S
- Release: Windows; WW: December 12, 2019; Consoles; WW: August 23, 2023
- Genre(s): Role-playing
- Mode(s): Single-player

Virgo Versus the Zodiac is role-playing video game developed by Moonana. Degica published it for Windows and macOS in 2019, and Serenity Forge published it for PlayStation 4 and 5, Xbox One and Series X/S, and Switch in 2023.

== Gameplay ==
Previously, the personifications of the astrological signs alternated in controlling the Milky Way. Virgo objects when each is given their own portion of the galaxy to permanently rule, and she attempts to usurp control of the other regions. It is a role-playing game with turn-based combat. All combats are During combat, up to three combatants can fight on each side, and each character has two health bars. The second bar, called purity, provides additional health and can be increased by defensive abilities. Offensive abilities decrease it. If attacked characters have purity points, they can use them to make a counterattack using a special skill.

Instead of skill trees, character gain skills through equipment. There are also real-time shoot 'em up sequences and quick time events that apply bonuses during combat. Players can adjust how difficult these quick time challenges are. Combats can be redone at will, but the only way to change equipment or the difficulty level is to load a saved game. It features pixel art graphics. While exploring, players can interact with non-player characters and choose dialogue options based on personality traits related to astrological signs. These choices affect how the game progresses.

== Development ==
Degica Games released the Windows and macOS versions on December 12, 2019. Serenity Forge released it for PlayStation 4 and 5, Xbox One and Series X/S, and Switch on August 23, 2023.

== Reception ==
On Metacritic, Virgo Versus the Zodiac received positive reviews for the Windows version and mixed reviews on the Switch. RP Gamer praised the themes, music, and combat system, but they found the plot obtuse and disliked managing their equipment to get skills. RPGSite called it "quite unique" and praised the combat and morality system. Though they said the game is not particularly deep, they recommended it people who enjoy offbeat games or less heroic protagonists. RPGFan said "every aspect of the game is worthy of praise", but they particularly enjoyed the music. Although they enjoyed the protagonist, TouchArcade said Virgo Versus the Zodiac is "a rather ordinary indie RPG". They recommended against the Switch version, which they said had performance problems that made the action sequences difficult.

RPGamer selected it for two of their 2019 awards: most overlooked and the Michael A. Cunningham Memorial Award, which was once again awarded for the being an overlooked role-playing game.
