= Bad End Theater =

2021 video game

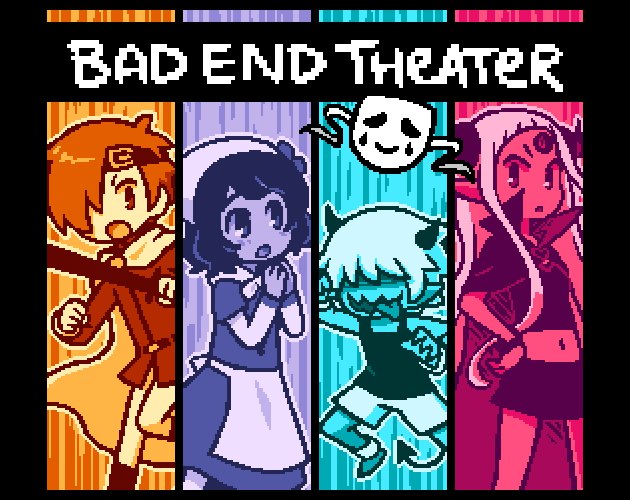
- Cover art with the main characters (from left to right): the Hero, the Maiden, the Underling, and the Overlord. The mask belongs to the theater's playwright, Tragedy.
- Developer: NomnomNami
- Publishers: NomnomNami (Windows); Serenity Forge (Console)
- Engine: Ren'Py
- Platforms: Windows: macOS; Linux; PlayStation 4; PlayStation 5; Xbox One; Xbox SeriesX/S; Nintendo Switch; Android
- Release: 26 October 2021: macOS, Linux, Windows; WW: 26 October 2021; Nintendo Switch, Xbox One, PlayStation 4, PlayStation 5; WW: 10 July 2025; Android; WW: 6 February 2022
- Genre: Visual novel
- Mode: Single-player

Bad End Theater (stylized in all caps) is a 2021 visual novel video game developed and published by indie developer NomnomNami. In the titular theater, the player controls the actions of four characters to explore different bad endings from the perspectives of each respective character. It was released for Windows on 26 October 2021 via Steam and for consoles on 10 July 2025 by Serenity Forge. Bad End Theater has received generally positive reviews, with reviewers praising the characters, gameplay, and story.

== Gameplay ==
The player can select one of four characters and assign personality traits to the other three. These characters are the Hero, the Maiden, the Underling, and the Overlord. These personality traits determine the choices the characters will make as the player controls their chosen character. The game has 41 bad endings from the different perspectives of each character, which can be unlocked through the choices of the player. Each ending functions as a clue to progress in other paths, and the unlocked paths can be seen in a decision tree. The game is narrated in the second person.

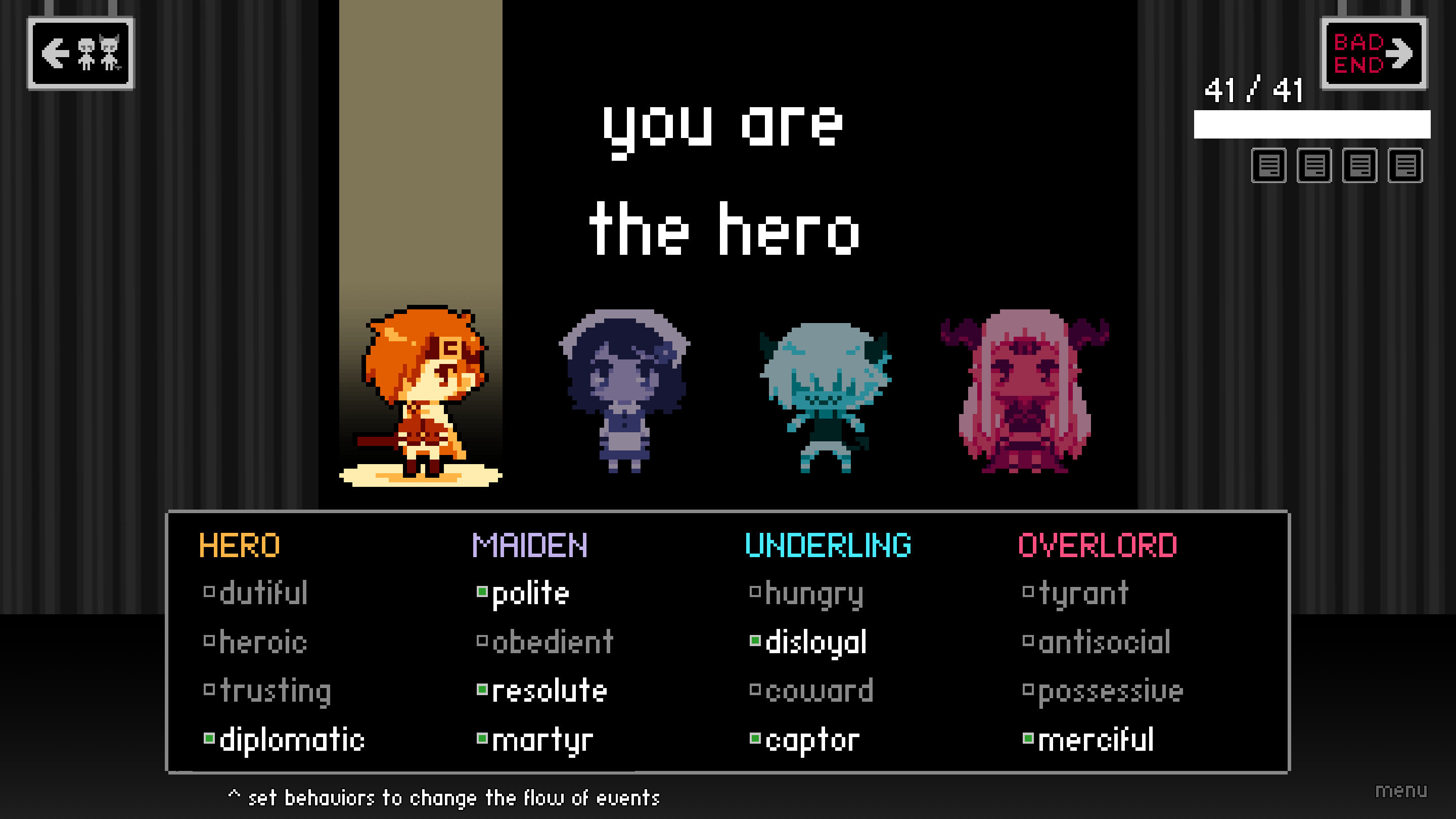
The character selection screen with all of the character traits, endings, and letters unlocked. The selected set of traits leads to the "True" bad ending.

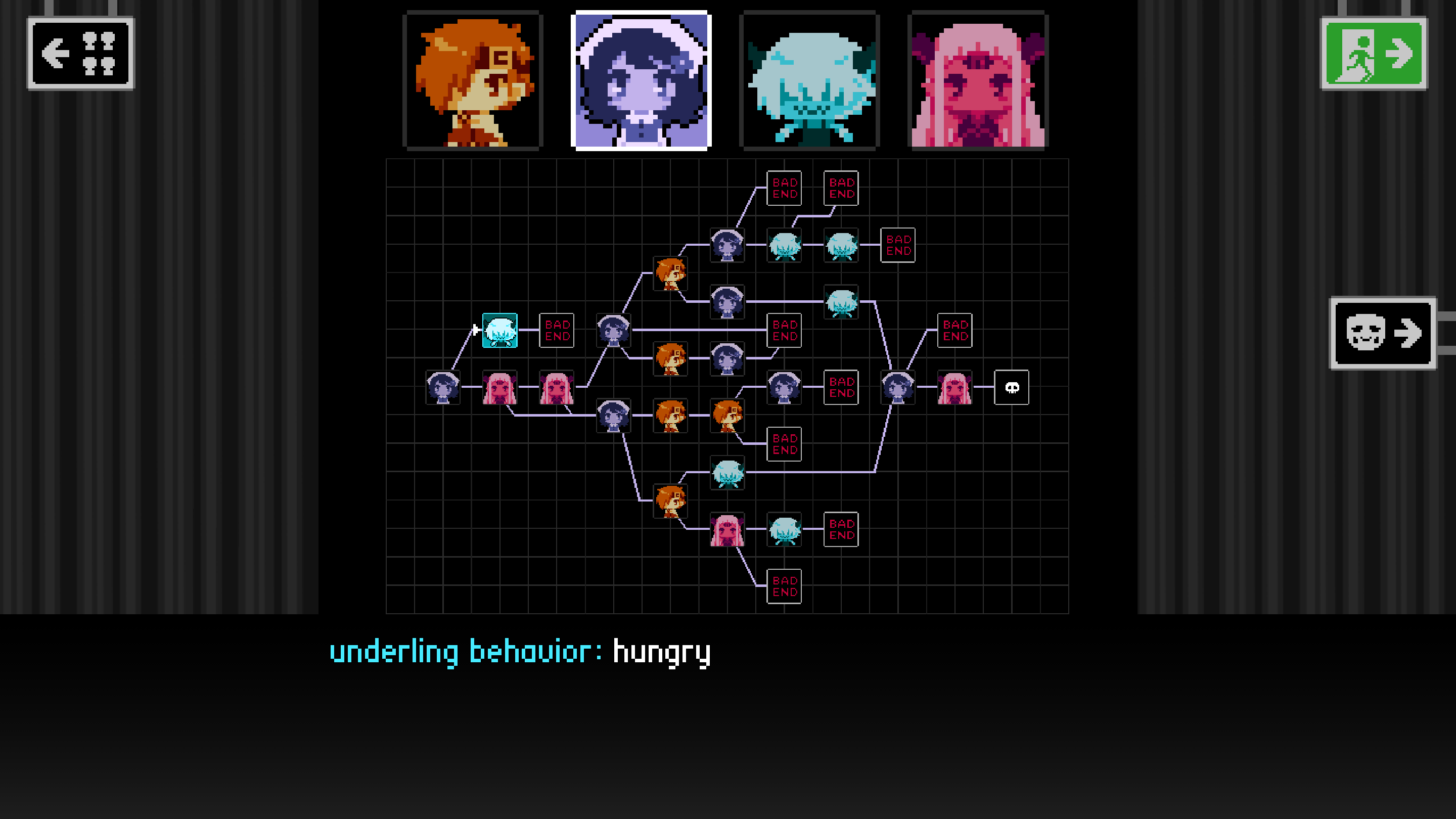
The tree diagram of the endings from the Maiden's perspective. If the player assigns the trait "hungry" to the Underling, the Maiden encounters her quickest bad ending: being promptly eaten by the Underling.

== Plot ==
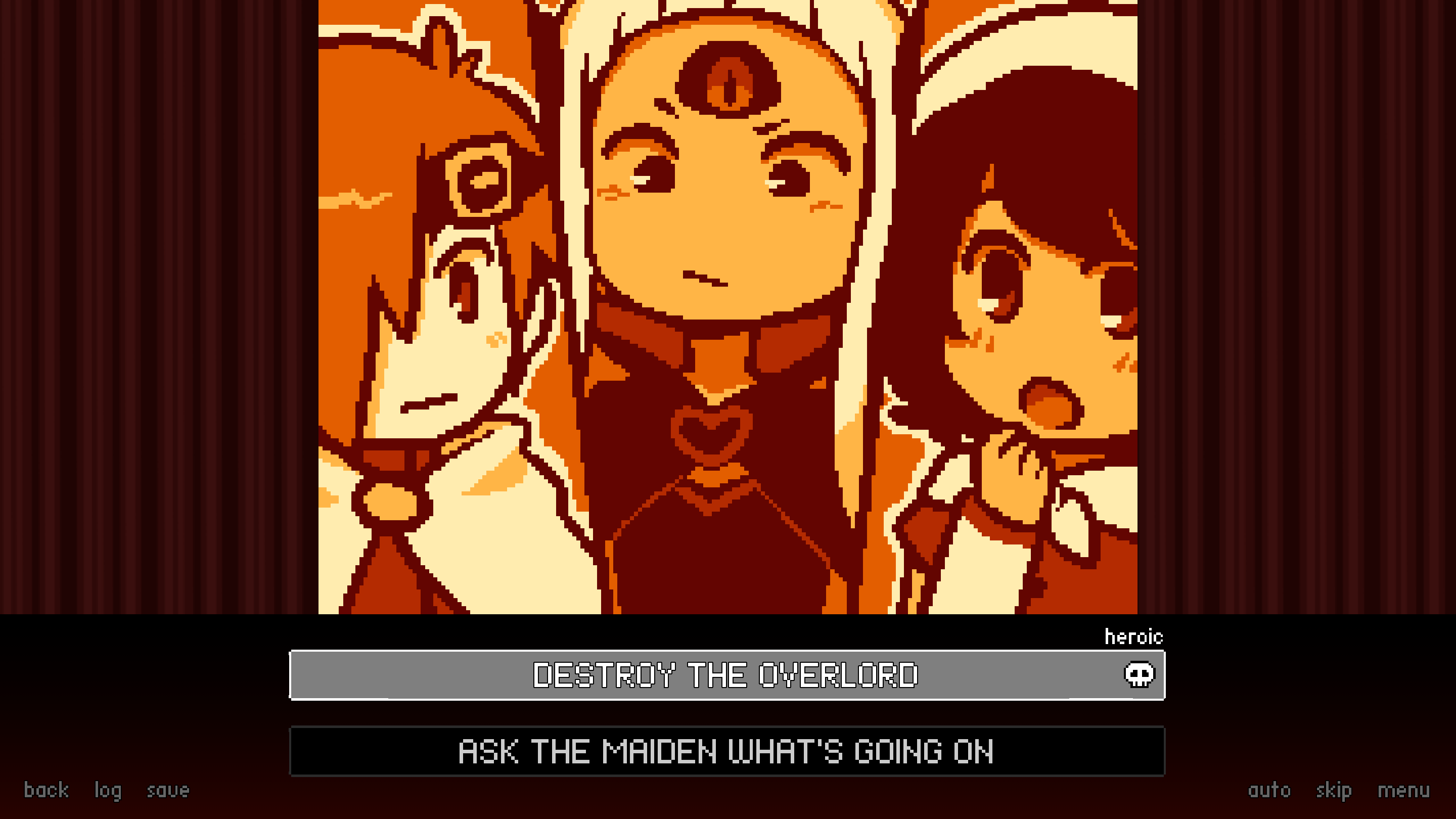
A confrontation between the Hero, the Overlord, and the Maiden, from the Hero's perspective (noted by the orange color). The player must choose how to proceed.

The characters act in a world of humans and demons, with a human village lying close by to a demons' castle. On most paths, the human Maiden ends up one way or the other in the castle where the demons live. The human Hero hears of this and goes to the castle in the Maiden's rescue. Along the way the Maiden and the Hero may interact with the demon Underling. The demon Overlord, ruler of the demons, and the Maiden bond in the latter's captivity. The player's choices determine the details and ultimate ending of the short story. As more storylines are discovered, mysterious letters are unlocked hinting at the nature of the theater's playwright.

Once all 41 bad endings have been discovered by the player, among them a climactic "true" bad ending featuring the main cast dying together, a new path outside the theater's story is unlocked. The player and the characters confront the theater's masked playwright, Tragedy. After a battle, it is revealed the player is Comedy, who had been looking for her lost lover Tragedy. Long before the theater's story began, Comedy and Tragedy had been separated due to their families' disapproval of their relationship. Tragedy later opened the Bad End Theater, witnessing many patrons come but none of them experiencing every story. It's only Comedy that explores it all and fights for a good ending for the characters. The in-story relationship between the Overlord and the Maiden is thus revealed to be a metaphor for Comedy's and Tragedy's relationship. The game ends with the reunion of Comedy and Tragedy, the good ending.

Each character has a pastel color, set of musical themes, and role associated to them. The Hero has an orange color and generally acts like an archetypical hero, being a young slayer of demons who attempts to protect the Maiden. The Maiden has a purple color and is expected by other humans to act like a damsel in distress, to be captured by the demon Overlord. The Underling has a cyan color and is an untrustworthy servant of the Overlord. The Overlord has a pink color and rules the demons. The game has a retro chiptune soundtrack and expressive pixel art. These elements contrast with the dark storylines of the theater.

The game's themes include prejudice, loyalty, free will, morality, fate, and the idea that truth depends on perspective.

== Development ==
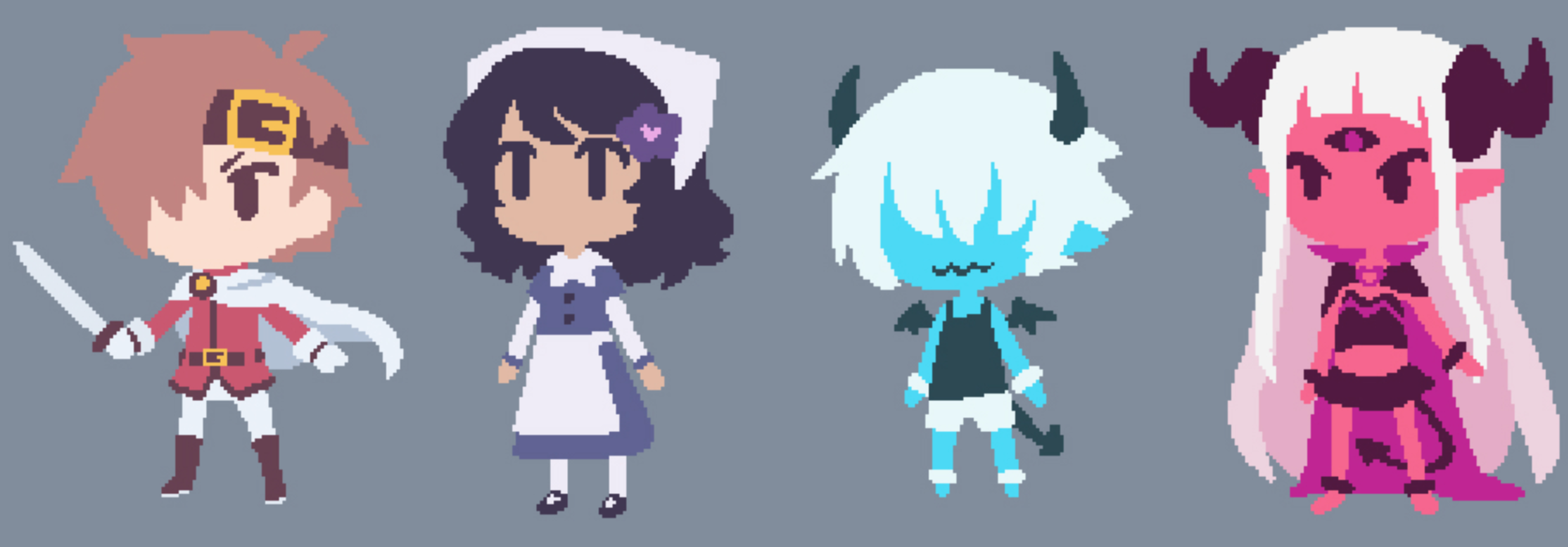
Concept art of the main cast

Bad End Theater was developed by indie game developer NomnomNami and was their first commercial game. Prior to its release the developer had made visual novels for years. They were drawn to create a visual novel where the player's choices as one character influenced how the story unfolded for others, and mentioned that the only other game with a similar mechanic they had played was Disgaea Infinite. NomnomNami wished for players to be motivated to explore all the paths they could, thinking the player would wonder if they could reach a good ending.

Discussing the cute visual style of the game, NomnomNami explained they wished to cause all the emotions of a tragic death without having to show gruesome details, instead opting for stylized drawings. They originally wanted to make a game about empathy but eventually that gave way to other themes like love.

The cast was originally designed in May 2015, and their characteristic color palettes were decided in 2017. The Underling and Overlord ultimately had their designs simplified, and the Hero went through many iterations.

The game uses the visual novel engine Ren'Py. In order to make the game more playable, NomnomNami designed the character trait toggles and timeline. They intended to find a balance between providing all the answers to the player and allowing them to explore by themselves.

== Reception ==
Reviewers have praised Bad End Theater's characters, gameplay, and story. Writing for TheGamer, Vanessa Esguerra described it as one of the best non-anime style visual novels.
