= The King's Bird =

2018 video game

- Developer: Serenity Forge
- Publisher: Graffiti Games
- Engine: Unity
- Platforms: Windows; Nintendo Switch; PlayStation 4; Xbox One
- Release: Windows; August 23, 2018; Switch, PS4, Xbox One; February 12, 2019
- Genre: Platform
- Mode: Single-player

The King's Bird is a platform game developed by American indie game studio Serenity Forge and published by Canadian indie game publisher Graffiti Games. The game was released for Windows on August 23, 2018 and presented at PAX East 2018 and the E3 Media Indie Exchange.

== Gameplay ==
Players utilize momentum to dash and glide through challenges in a world of silhouettes. As the levels progress, they becoming increasingly challenging. The game emphasizes a minimalist, artistic presentation with bright colors and gameplay inspired by other games of the precision-platformer genre, such as Dustforce, Super Meat Boy and N+.

== Reception ==
Reception

Aggregate score
Aggregator	Score
Metacritic	(PC) 67/100 (NS) 66/100

Review scores
Publication	Score
GameSpot	(PC) 5/10
Jeuxvideo.com	(PC) 12/20
Nintendo Life	(NS) 7/10
Nintendo World Report	(NS) 6/10

The game received generally positive reviews, with an average of 67 on Metacritic for the PC version and a 66 for the Switch version. Tom McShea of GameSpot gave the game a 5/10, complementing "the great sense of freedom" found in the game's movement but criticizing excessive difficulty in later levels, saying "as the walls close tighter around you, that fun begins to dissipate". Twinfinite's Andrew McMahon, who gave the game a 3.5/5, also criticizes the later levels, stating they require "pinpoint accuracy". However, he praised the aesthetic presentation saying "you’ll feel like you are floating through a real-life painting in each Kingdom." Inés Barriocanal of IGN Spain gave the game a 7.5/10, saying it has a "really beautiful and vibrant environment" and "celestial music", though she says the controls are sometimes "not as accurate as I would like". The game received a 3.5/5 from Jordan Helm of Hardcore Gamer, who said the game has "sparse storytelling", but that it delivers "on its challenge and integration of physics" and this results in "a satisfying precision-platformer overall." TrueAchievements' Mark Delaney put the game on his list of "Favorite Indie and Under the Radar Games at PAX West 2018", saying that "The King's Bird is a perfect fit for speedrunners who like to achieve perfection."

The Switch, PS4 and Xbox One versions were nominated for the Central Park Children's Zoo Award for Best Kids Game at the 9th Annual New York Game Awards.
