= Serenity Forge =

American video game developer

Serenity Forge LLC
- Type: Private
- Industry: Video games
- Founded: 2014; 12 years ago
- Founder: Zhenghua Yang
- Headquarters: Boulder, Colorado, US
- Number of employees: 40+ (2025)
- Website: serenityforge.com

Serenity Forge LLC is an American video game developer and publisher based in Boulder, Colorado. The studio was founded in 2014 by Zhenghua "Z" Yang. As of December 2025, it has 40+ employees.

== History ==
Upon graduating from the University of Colorado Boulder's Leeds School of Business in 2014, Zhenghua Yang (commonly referred to as Z) formally founded Serenity Forge in Boulder, Colorado, with the mission to "create meaningful games that challenge the way players think," according to the company's official website. Despite his academic background in finance and economics, Yang, a lifelong gamer, decided to pursue a career in video games because he saw more potential and fulfillment in the medium. Prior to graduating college, Yang (under the Serenity Forge brand) released the studio's debut game Loving Life in 2012. Loving Life released for free on online platforms and serves as an autobiographical visual novel detailing Yang's personal experience coping with chronic refractory idiopathic thrombocytopenic purpura, a rare autoimmune disease that saw him hospitalized for over two years as a teenager.

In 2016, Serenity Forge began publishing games by third-party developers in addition to making its own. The Studio's first publishing releases were Stage 2 Studios' science fiction exploration game Lifeless Planet and developer Ludo Land's narrative puzzle game Four Sided Fantasy.

== Games ==
Year	Title	Developer(s)	Publisher(s)	Platform(s)	Ref.
2012	Loving Life	Serenity Forge	Serenity Forge	Microsoft Windows	
2014	Lifeless Planet	Stage 2 Studios	Serenity Forge	PlayStation 4, Nintendo Switch	
2014	Luna's Wandering Stars	Serenity Forge	Serenity Forge	Microsoft Windows	
2015	Pixel Galaxy	Serenity Forge	Serenity Forge	Microsoft Windows	
2016	Four Sided Fantasy	Ludo Land	Serenity Forge	Microsoft Windows, PlayStation 4, Xbox One	
2017	Mystic Melee	Serenity Forge	Serenity Forge	Microsoft Windows	
2017	Pinstripe	Atmos Games	Serenity Forge, Armor Games	Microsoft Windows, PlayStation 4, Nintendo Switch, Xbox One, macOS	
2018	A Case of Distrust	Ben Wander	Serenity Forge	Microsoft Windows, Nintendo Switch, iOS	
2018	The King's Bird	Serenity Forge	Graffiti Games	Microsoft Windows, PlayStation 4, Nintendo Switch, Xbox One	
2018	Where the Water Tastes Like Wine	Dim Bulb Games, Serenity Forge	Serenity Forge, Good Shepherd Entertainment	Microsoft Windows, PlayStation 4, Nintendo Switch, Xbox One, macOS	
2019	Virgo Versus The Zodiac	Moonana	Serenity Forge	Microsoft Windows, Nintendo Switch, PlayStation 4, PlayStation 5, Xbox One, Xbox Series X/S	
2020	Half Past Fate	Serenity Forge	Way Down Deep	Microsoft Windows, Nintendo Switch	
2020	The Alto Collection	Snowman, Serenity Forge	Snowman	Microsoft Windows, PlayStation 4, Nintendo Switch, Xbox One	
2020	Neversong	Serenity Forge, Atmos Games	Serenity Forge	Microsoft Windows, PlayStation 4, Nintendo Switch, Xbox One, Apple Arcade	
2021	Half Past Fate: Romantic Distancing	Serenity Forge	Way Down Deep	Microsoft Windows, Nintendo Switch	
2021	Cyanide & Happiness - Freakpocalypse (Episode 1)	Explosm, Skeleton Crew Studios	Serenity Forge	Microsoft Windows, Nintendo Switch, PlayStation 4, PlayStation 5, Xbox One, Xbox Series X/S	
2021	Date Night Bowling	Serenity Forge	Way Down Deep	Microsoft Windows	
2021	Land of Screens	Serenity Forge	Way Down Deep	Microsoft Windows, Nintendo Switch	
2021	Doki Doki Literature Club Plus!	Team Salvato, Serenity Forge	Serenity Forge	Microsoft Windows, Nintendo Switch, PlayStation 4, Xbox One, PlayStation 5, Xbox Series X/S, macOS, Android, iOS	
2021	Death's Gambit: Afterlife	White Rabbit	Serenity Forge	Microsoft Windows, Nintendo Switch, PlayStation 4, Xbox One	
2022	Land of Screens	Serenity Forge	Way Down Deep	Microsoft Windows, Nintendo Switch	
2022	Flipper Lifter	Serenity Forge	Serenity Forge	Playdate	
2023	Arcadian Atlas	Twin Otter Studios	Serenity Forge	Microsoft Windows, macOS, Linux, Nintendo Switch, PlayStation 4, Xbox One, PlayStation 5, Xbox Series X/S	
2023	Smile For Me	LimboLane	Serenity Forge	Nintendo Switch, PlayStation 4, Xbox One, PlayStation 5, Xbox Series X/S	
2023	Homestead Arcana	Serenity Forge	Skybound Entertainment	Microsoft Windows, Xbox Series X/S	
2023	LISA - Definitive Edition	Dingaling Productions	Serenity Forge	Microsoft Windows, Xbox Series X/S, Nintendo Switch, PlayStation 5	
2023	Lifeless Moon	Stage 2 Studios	Serenity Forge	Microsoft Windows, PlayStation 4, PlayStation 5, Xbox One, Xbox Series X/S	
2023	Long Gone Days	This I Dreamt	Serenity Forge	Microsoft Windows, Nintendo Switch, PlayStation 4, PlayStation 5, Xbox One, Xbox Series X/S	
2024	Loving Life (Remastered)	Serenity Forge	Serenity Forge	Microsoft Windows, Nintendo Switch	
2024	Keylocker	Moonana	Serenity Forge	Microsoft Windows, Xbox One, Xbox Series X/S, Nintendo Switch, PlayStation 4, PlayStation 5	
2024	Slay the Princess — The Pristine Cut	Black Tabby Games	Serenity Forge	Microsoft Windows, Nintendo Switch, PlayStation 4, PlayStation 5, Xbox One, Xbox Series X/S	
2024	To the Moon	Freebird Games	Serenity Forge	PlayStation 5, Xbox Series X/S	
2024	To the Moon: Sigmund Minisode 1 (Holiday Special)	Freebird Games	Serenity Forge	PlayStation 5, Xbox Series X/S, Nintendo Switch	
2024	To the Moon: Sigmund Minisode 2 (Holiday Special)	Freebird Games	Serenity Forge	PlayStation 5, Xbox Series X/S, Nintendo Switch	
2025	Centum	Hack The Publisher	Serenity Forge	Microsoft Windows, PlayStation 4, PlayStation 5, Xbox One, Xbox Series X/S, Nintendo Switch	
2025	Cooking Companions	Deer Dreams Studios	Serenity Forge	PlayStation 4, PlayStation 5, Xbox One, Xbox Series X/S, Nintendo Switch	
2025	Bad End Theater	NomnomNami	Serenity Forge	PlayStation 4, PlayStation 5, Xbox One, Xbox Series X/S, Nintendo Switch	
2025	Return to Ash	Serenity Forge	Serenity Forge	Microsoft Windows	
2025	Noctuary	Gratesca Studio	Serenity Forge	PlayStation 5, Xbox Series X/S, Nintendo Switch	
2025	Finding Paradise	Freebird Games	Serenity Forge	PlayStation 5, Xbox One, Xbox Series X/S	
2026	Puppergeist	Serenity Forge	Serenity Forge	Microsoft Windows, Xbox Series X/S, Nintendo Switch	
2026	Roman Sands RE:Build	Arbitrary Metric	Serenity Forge	Microsoft Windows, PlayStation 4, PlayStation 5, Xbox One, Xbox Series X/S, Nintendo Switch	
2026	A Bird Story	Freebird Games	Serenity Forge	PlayStation 5, Xbox Series X/S, Nintendo Switch	
2026	Springs, Eternal	Fullbright	Serenity Forge	Microsoft Windows	
2026	Delphinum	CINNADEV	Serenity Forge	Microsoft Windows, Xbox Series X/S	
2026	Sister Other Paranoia	HazeDenki	Serenity Forge	Microsoft Windows, macOS	
2027	Vivarium	Studio Meadowflower	Serenity Forge	Microsoft Windows, Xbox Series X/S	
2027	Faraday Blues	Serenity Forge	Serenity Forge	Microsoft Windows, PlayStation 5, Xbox Series X/S	
TBA	Fractured Blooms	Serenity Forge	Serenity Forge	Microsoft Windows, Xbox One, Xbox Series X/S	
