= This Way Madness Lies =

- Developer(s): Zeboyd Games
- Publisher(s): Zeboyd Games
- Platform(s): Windows; Nintendo Switch; PlayStation 5
- Release: Win; WW: November 10, 2022; Switch; WW: July 25, 2023; PS5; WW: September 12, 2023
- Genre(s): Role-playing
- Mode(s): Single-player

This Way Madness Lies is a 2022 role-playing video game by Zeboyd Games. It combines magical girl and Shakespearean themes in a retro pixel art aesthetic.

== Gameplay ==
Players control a group of magical girls who attempt to help Romeo fight monsters. They are Shakespeare fans and often reference his works throughout the game. It is styled after 1990s console JRPGs and uses retro pixel art graphics. Combat is turn-based. Each character has unique skills selectable through menus similar to Shining Force. Characters do not use equipment, such as weapons or armor, and the party levels up as a whole. The difficulty level is changeable at any time.

== Development ==
Developer Zeboyd Games is based in the United States. It released This Way Madness Lies for Windows on November 10, 2022; for Switch on July 24, 2023; and for PlayStation 5 on September 12, 2023.

== Reception ==
Reception

Aggregate score
| Aggregator | Score |
|---|---|
| Metacritic | 84/100 |

Review scores
| Publication | Score |
|---|---|
| Nintendo World Report | 9/10 |
| RPGamer | 4.5/5 |
| RPGFan | 90/100 |

This Way Madness Lies received "generally favorable" reviews on Metacritic. Calling it "fun and engaging", PC Gamer praised the graphics and pacing. RPGamer said that it is a welcome respite from longer games while remaining just as fulfilling. They enjoyed the humor, art, and combat system. Though they criticized the replay value, RPGFan called it "an excellent snack-sized title for fans of Shakespeare, magical girls, or JRPGs in general" and designated it an editor's choice. Digitally Downloaded said the combination of Shakespeare with magical girls was "a resounding success" and said that although the game may seem short, it is the perfect length for its content. Nintendo World Report said they wanted more control over the party's composition in combat, but they said having all characters gain experience at the same time mitigated this. They praised the humor and runtime, though they said they said the Switch has a long initial load time.
