= Monster Menu: The Scavenger's Cookbook =

- Developer(s): Nippon Ichi Software
- Publisher(s): Nippon Ichi Software
- Platform(s): PlayStation 4; Nintendo Switch; PlayStation 5
- Release: PS4, Switch; JP: January 27, 2022; AS: May 23, 2022; NA: May 23, 2023; EU: May 26, 2023; PS5; NA: May 23, 2023; EU: May 26, 2023
- Genre(s): Tactical role-playing
- Mode(s): Single-player

Monster Menu: The Scavenger's Cookbook is a 2022 tactical role-playing video game by Nippon Ichi Software. Players control a group of adventurers lost in a dungeon as they hunt monsters to eat so they do not starve.

== Gameplay ==
After entering a what is supposed to be an easy dungeon, an inexperienced adventurer nearly dies of starvation and dehydration. Players control a party they join as they attempt to survive in the procedurally generated dungeon by eating monsters. Besides hunger and dehydration, players must manage the party's happiness levels. Feeding characters food they find gross makes them unhappy, and hunger causes their statistics to drop. Different kinds of recipes can help to make food more palatable, such as hiding nutritious insects inside buns. When their hunger meter runs low, any further damage goes to their hit points. Combat is turn-based and takes place on a grid, as in tactical role-playing games. If the characters die, they respawn at their last checkpoint or the dungeon's entrance. Some equipment is retained. It uses anime-style graphics.

== Development ==
Nippon Ichi Software released Monster Menu: The Scavenger's Cookbook for the PlayStation 4 and Nintendo Switch in Japan on January 27, 2022. It was released for PlayStation 4, PlayStation 5, and Switch in North America on May 23, 2023, and the European released followed three days later.

== Reception ==
Monster Menu: The Scavenger's Cookbook received mixed reviews on Metacritic. RPGFan said the cooking minigame is fun at first, but the grinding required due to Monster Menu's randomness makes it feel repetitive. Push Square enjoyed the character creation and the cooking, but they similarly criticized the grinding and repetition. Sports Illustrated said it has "a weird amount of dodgy fan service", very little story, and poor combat. Digitally Downloaded praised its roguelike elements and compared its difficulty to Rogue itself. Despite enjoying the premise and the cooking minigame, they were disappointed that Monster Menu did not run with the survival concept. TouchArcade said it is playable but becomes "dreadfully dull" due to the repetition, grinding, and lack of depth. Although Nintendo World Report said they would look at a sequel, they found Monster Menu to be too focused on adding gameplay mechanics rather than fun.
