= Tails Noir =

2021 video game

- Developer: EggNut
- Publisher: Raw Fury
- Director: Aleksandra Korabelnikova
- Producer: Ishani Birch
- Designer: Alexander Kolchin
- Programmers: Nikita Danshin; Artem Pisarev; Diana Stolyrova
- Artists: Toma Klepinina; Kristina Dashevskaya; Kirill Simonenko; Julia Migacheva; Sonya Ptitsyna; Antonina Shipulina
- Writers: Danny Wadeson; Alexandra Korabelnikova; Martin Hanses
- Composers: Nikita Danshin; Arooj Aftab
- Engine: Unreal Engine 4
- Platforms: Microsoft Windows; PlayStation 4; PlayStation 5; Xbox One; Xbox Series X/S; Nintendo Switch
- Release: 8 June 2021: Microsoft Windows; 8 June 2021; PS4, PS5, Xbox One, Xbox Series X/S; 28 October 2021; Nintendo Switch; 9 February 2022
- Genre: Role-playing
- Mode: Single-player

Tails Noir (previously known as Backbone) is a 2021 noir role-playing indie video game by Canadian developer EggNut and published by Raw Fury. It was released for Microsoft Windows in June 2021, for PlayStation 4, PlayStation 5, Xbox One and Xbox Series X/S in October 2021, and on Nintendo Switch in February 2022. A prequel, titled Tails Noir Preludes, was released in February 2023 on Windows.

== Plot ==
Gameplay screenshot.

Set in a dystopian version of Vancouver, Canada, populated by anthropomorphic creatures, Tails Noir follows Howard Lotor, a raccoon and private detective tasked with solving mysteries.

== Reception ==
Reception

Aggregate score
Aggregator	Score
Metacritic	PC: 72/100; PS5: 63/100

Review scores
Publication	Score
Adventure Gamers	4/5
Destructoid	7/10
RPGFan	78/100
Shacknews	6/10
The Guardian	3/5

The game was awarded with the Gran Prix, Best PC Game and Best Art categories at the DevGAMM Unreal Engine competition in Minsk, Belarus, and with the Best Indie Game Award at the Strasbourg European Film Festival in France.

== Prequel ==
A prequel, titled Tails Noir Preludes, was released in February 2023 on Windows.
