= Jack Move =

2022 video game

- Developer: So Romantic
- Publisher: HypeTrain Digital
- Programmer: Edd Parris
- Artist: Joe Williamson
- Writer: Amalie Kae
- Composer: Charlie Fieber
- Engine: Unity
- Platforms: macOS; Windows; Nintendo Switch; PlayStation 4; Xbox One
- Release: macOS, Windows; September 8, 2022; Nintendo Switch, PlayStation 4, Xbox One; September 20, 2022
- Genre: Role-playing
- Mode: Single-player

Jack Move is a role-playing video game developed by So Romantic and published by HypeTrain Digital in 2022 for macOS, Windows, Nintendo Switch, PlayStation 4, and Xbox One.

== Gameplay ==
Jack Move is a single player turn based role playing game. The combat system of the game is based around strategic use of three different elements.

== Development ==
Development of the game started in 2012, with the creation of a battle system. According to a 2021 interview in Wireframe Magazine, game was developed in the Unity game engine, making use of 3D environments in conjunction with a forced perspective, video post-processing and other artistic techniques to create the illusion of a 2D overworld. The game was influenced by Golden Sun and the Final Fantasy series, as well as by elements of the film Hackers.

A public demo was released on Steam during the 2021 Steam Summer Festival. In August 2022 an animated trailer was released.

The Windows and macOS versions launched on September 8, 2022, with console versions for Nintendo Switch, PlayStation 4, and Xbox One following on September 20, 2022.

== Reception ==
Reception

Aggregate score
Aggregator	Score
Metacritic	PC: 75/100; NS: 87/100

Review scores
Publication	Score
Nintendo Life	NS: 9/10
Nintendo World Report	NS: 9/10
RPGamer	3/5
RPGFan	85/100

Jack Move received "generally favorable" reviews based on five critics on the review aggregator website Metacritic.

A number of praised the game's impactful nature in spite of its short length.
