= Robert Boyd (game developer) =

Developer of 8-bit and 16-bit-style games

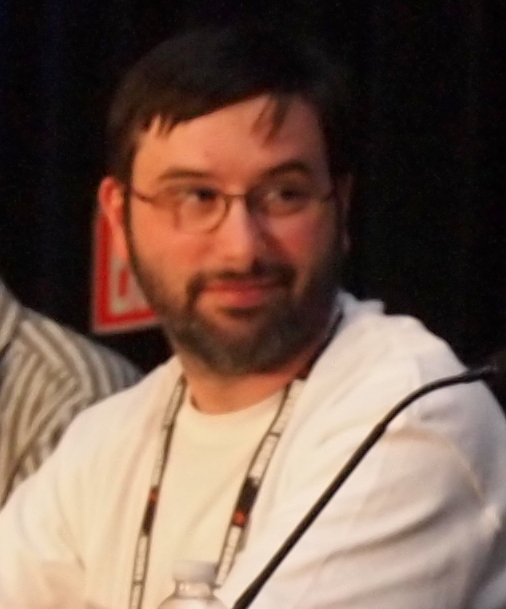
- Boyd in 2011
- Occupation: Game developer
- Notable work: Epiphany in Spaaace!, Molly the Were-Zompire, Breath of Death VII, Cthulhu Saves the World, Penny Arcade's On The Rain-Slick Precipice of Darkness 3, Penny Arcade's On The Rain-Slick Precipice of Darkness 4, Cosmic Star Heroine, Cthulhu Saves Christmas, This Way Madness Lies
- Website: zeboyd.com

Robert Boyd is an indie developer specializing in retro-style 16-bit role-playing video games. Based in Lake Arrowhead, California, he is most widely known for co-creating the indie game studio Zeboyd Games alongside William Stiernberg and programming, designing, and writing the studio's games. Stiernberg left the studio in 2023, but it continues onward under Boyd.

Much of the studio's work is comedic in nature and parodies Lovecraftian horror. Its first games were the interactive fiction works Epiphany In Spaaace! and Molly the Were-Zompire for Xbox Live Arcade, which were remastered for Windows in 2023. Soon afterward, the studio released its first RPGs, Breath of Death VII and Cthulhu Saves the World. The studio was then contracted to develop the third and fourth installments in the Penny Arcade Adventures series. In 2017, Zeboyd released the original IP Cosmic Star Heroine, a sci-fi adventure. The studio subsequently returned to comedy games with Cthulhu Saves Christmas and This Way Madness Lies.

The studio's games are typically short in length and have been positively received by critics and commended for their writing, gameplay, and value. Boyd is known as an advocate for low prices in indie games, running contrary to much of the industry.

== Games ==
Logo of Zeboyd Games

=== Epiphany in Spaaace! and Molly the Were-Zompire ===
Epiphany In Spaaace! is an interactive fiction story released on October 20, 2009, on Xbox Live Indie Games. A sci-fi parody, it follows the travails of Philemon K. Bort (possible Captain of the U.S.S. Epiphany, one of the latest additions to the Universal Galactic Space Corps fleet). Molly the Were-Zompire was released shortly afterwards on December 10, 2009. It follows the character Molly Desper, who is turned into a were-zombie-vampire. Both titles sold about 500-700 copies.

A remastered compilation pack of both games, under the modified title Molly the Werezompire, was released for Windows on December 29, 2023. Sam Wachter of RPGamer reviewed both games as "hilarious," saying that despite their short length, they were well worth the price.

=== Breath of Death VII: The Beginning ===
Co-created with William Stiernberg, Breath of Death VII: The Beginning was released on April 22, 2010, on Xbox Live Indie Games. A retro-style comedy RPG, Dem the Skeleton Knight, Sara the Ghost Historian, Lita the Vampire Techie, and Erik the Zombie Prince are customized via a branching ability tree. Robert felt that most turn-based RPGs were too slow, so Breath of Death VII battles employ a combo system based on player character choices with non-player characters receiving a strength bonus based on how many turns the fight has gone, giving the battles a pseudo-time limit. Additionally, the number of encounters in an area are limited. With more than 40,000 sales, Breath of Death VII has a 2/3 conversion rate from the trial.

Despite its title, it is the only game of its "series," and the previous "six" do not exist. The title is simply a parody of serial RPGs whose sequels are often not in chronological order.

=== Cthulhu Saves the World ===
Co-created with Bill Stiernberg, Cthulhu Saves the World was released on December 30, 2010, on Xbox Live. Cthulhu, the squid-faced, winged god created by H. P. Lovecraft emerges from the sea after centuries of slumber only to find his dark powers immediately sealed away by a mysterious holy wizard. A narrator then informs the player that the only way to break the curse is to become a true hero. Quickly breaking the fourth wall, Cthulhu informs the narrator that he was eavesdropping and now knows how to break the curse. Like Breath of Death VII, Cthulhu Saves the World has a branching level-up system and caps random encounters in an area (there is an option where the player can choose from the menu to have additional encounters). The "Hey There, Cthulhu" music video was produced by Nakatomi HMC using the parody song written and recorded by Eben Brooks. All in-game music was composed and recorded by Gordon McNeil.

Zeboyd Games began a Kickstarter fundraiser towards development of an enhanced version of the game for PC and Xbox 360 platforms; it was more than successfully funded on February 16, 2011, garnering over twice the fundraiser's goal. The new version was officially announced on March 14, 2011, retitling the game as "Cthulhu Saves the World: Super Hyper Enhanced Championship Edition Alpha Diamond DX Plus Alpha FES HD - Premium Enhanced Game of the Year Collector's Edition (without Avatars!)". The PC version was released on July 13, 2011, together with Breath of Death VII on Valve's Steam service. The Steam version was a financial success, making more revenue in its first week of release than in a year and a half on the Xbox 360. By November 21, 2011, the "Zeboyd Games Combo Pack" (Cthulhu Saves the World & Breath of Death VII) had sold over 100,000 copies on Steam in less than four months after release.

=== Penny Arcade's On the Rain-Slick Precipice of Darkness 3 and 4 ===
Zeboyd Games developed Episode 3 of Penny Arcade Adventures: On the Rain-Slick Precipice of Darkness, which was released on June 25, 2012. Robert Boyd and Bill Stiernberg, along with Jerry Holkins and Jeff Kalles, hosted a panel at PAX East in Boston on April 6, 2012. Zeboyd Games also developed Episode 4, which was released on June 7, 2013.

=== Cosmic Star Heroine ===
Cosmic Star Heroine is a science fiction RPG that was released in April 2017 for Microsoft Windows and PlayStation 4. A PS Vita and Nintendo Switch version followed in 2018. It received positive reviews.

=== Cthulhu Saves Christmas ===
Zeboyd officially announced Cthulhu Saves Christmas, a prequel to Cthulhu Saves the World, on their personal website on July 29, 2019. It was subsequently released on PC on December 23, 2019. In the side-scrolling JRPG, Cthulhu teams up with Santa Claus's granddaughter to stop Jack Frost before Christmas is cancelled forever. Along the way he fights Krampus, Mari Lwyd, and other “Christmas League of Evil villains” in turn-based combat. He also builds “R'lyehtionship” levels with his friends.

=== This Way Madness Lies ===
This Way Madness Lies is a Shakespeare-themed magical girl role-playing game. It was released on November 10, 2022, for Microsoft Windows.
