= Arcadian Atlas =

- Developer: Twin Otter Studios
- Publisher: Serenity Forge
- Designers: Taylor Bair, Becca Bair
- Programmer: Paddy Otterness
- Artist: Becca Bair
- Composer: Moritz P.G. Katz
- Engine: Unity
- Platforms: Windows; Linux; macOS; PlayStation 4; PlayStation 5; Xbox One; Xbox Series X/S; Nintendo Switch
- Release: Windows, macOS, Linux; July 27, 2023; PS4, PS5, Xbox One, Series X/S, Nintendo Switch; November 30, 2023
- Genre: Tactical role-playing
- Mode: Single-player

Arcadian Atlas is a tactical role-playing video game developed by Twin Otter Studios and published in 2023 by Serenity Forge. The game features 2D pixel art graphics inspired by games of the '90s like Chrono Trigger, Breath of Fire, and Suikoden and gameplay reminiscent of titles such as Tactics Ogre and Final Fantasy Tactics.

== Gameplay ==
Players engage in turn-based, tactical combat on a grid. They can control up to five characters in combat. Four character classes are initially available, but a total of ten are unlockable. Each class has a skill tree, and characters can change their class. Doing so causes them to stop progressing in their previous class, limiting their progression to the new one. Newly recruited characters can be customized and have the same amount of skill as other characters in the party.

== Plot ==
After poisoning the king of Arcadia, power-hungry Queen Venezia declares Princesses Lucretia and Annalise illegitimate and seizes power. After Lucretia confronts Venezia, she is exiled and flees. Players control two soldiers, Vashti and Desmond, who have been ordered to escort Annalise to a monastery and soon start navigating the royal intrigue.

== Development ==
Twin Otter Studios was founded by siblings Taylor and Becca Bair from Texas. They were inspired by classical turn-based RPG's and used RPG Maker MV as a base to create a homage. Taylor did the story and animation work, Becca did the pixel art, Paddy Otterness did the programming, and Moritz P.G. Katz was composer on the soundtrack and sound effects. They crowdfunded Arcadian Atlas through Kickstarter in 2016. It was only halfway funded until its last two days, when it reached its goal of $90K on May 8, 2016. During the initial development of the game, Becca took freelance work for additional money. Arcadian Atlas' development was included in the 2016 documentary Surviving Indie.

Soon after the Kickstarter campaign ended the engine was switched to Unity. The development was halted by the COVID pandemic and continued after Twin Otter Studios secured a publishing deal with Serenity Forge. Arcadian Atlas was aiming at the 2022 release but it was eventually pushed to the summer of 2023.

== Release ==
Arcadian Atlas was featured at Gamescom 2021 with a trailer specifying the release date. A new trailer was released in the summer of 2022.

Serenity Forge released for Linux, macOS, and Windows on July 27, 2023. Digital edition soundtrack was released along with the game with vinyl edition to be available at a later date in 2024.

Ports to the PlayStation 4 and 5, Xbox One and Series X/S, and Nintendo Switch were released on November 30, 2023.

== Reception ==
Reception

Aggregate scores
Aggregator	Score
Metacritic	PC: 63/100
OpenCritic	24% recommend

Review scores
Publication	Score
Nintendo World Report	6/10
RPGamer	3.5/5 stars
RPGFan	82%
TouchArcade	3.5/5

The PC version of Arcadian Atlas received "mixed or average" reviews from critics, according to the review aggregation website Metacritic. Fellow review aggregator OpenCritic assessed that the game received weak approval, being recommended by 24% of critics.

RPGamer recommended it to fans of turn-based tactical RPGs and indie games. They said the combat is easy but praised the game's focus on narrative.

RPGFan called it "a solid, concise SRPG crafted with a lot of heart".

RPGSite said it is "mediocre yet competent" and said it fails to effectively capitalize on its ideas. They criticized the story, the camera's fixed perspective, and what they felt was imbalanced combat, though they said fans of the genre may enjoy Arcadian Atlas if they are willing to forgive some issues in a new developer's first game.

MMORPG reviewer said that "If you’re looking for a good strategy game that you can play on modern platforms, I’d still give Arcadian Atlas a pass."

PC Gamer stated that "Arcadian Atlas doesn't bring anything revolutionary to bear, but the combat, the story, and especially the music all reach a high bar that make it worth paying attention to."
