= Centum (video game) =

2025 point-and-click adventure game

- Developer: Hack The Publisher
- Publisher: Serenity Forge
- Platforms: macOS; Nintendo Switch; PlayStation 4 PlayStation 5 Xbox One; Xbox Series X/S; Windows
- Release: March 11, 2025
- Genres: Point-and-click adventure, psychological horror, visual novel
- Mode: Single-player

Centum is a 2025 point-and-click adventure game developed by Hack The Publisher and published by Serenity Forge. The game was released on Nintendo Switch, macOS, PlayStation 4, PlayStation 5, Xbox One, Xbox Series X/S, and Windows on March 11, 2025.

Centum received generally favorable reviews upon release.

== Gameplay ==
Gameplay screenshot.

Centum is a point-and-click adventure game featuring various shifting settings and art styles. It also includes various in-game computer interfaces that continually evolve. Gameplay mostly consists of clicking on objects in the environment, navigating the interfaces, and selecting dialogue and actions from boxes.

== Plot ==
Centum is presented as a long-lost unreleased game and has an unreliable narrator. It initially begins with a prisoner attempting to escape their cell. The crux of the game revolves around an artificial intelligence adapting to the player's choices. The game features five main endings.

== Development ==
The title is in development by Hack The Publisher, an independent game developer based in Tallinn, Estonia. The studio previously released two games; tower defense game Dwarven Skykeep in 2022, and side-scrolling beat 'em up Vengeance of Mr. Peppermint in 2023.

In an interview with GamingBolt, studio head Andrey Kiryushkin named The Stanley Parable, Doki Doki Literature Club, and I Have No Mouth, and I Must Scream among Centum's inspirations.

== Release and marketing ==
Centum was announced by Hack The Publisher on April 29, 2024, during IGN's ID@Xbox presentation and was initially scheduled to release Summer 2024. Several outlets previewed the game in May 2024. Among other titles, Serenity Forge showcased Centum to the public at both Gamescom and PAX West 2024. At the Indie Horror Showcase 2024, the game was announced for a new release window of 2025. A release date of March 11, 2025, was announced in February 2025, alongside ports for additional platforms. The game is available on Nintendo Switch, macOS, PlayStation 4, PlayStation 5, Xbox Series X/S, and Windows systems.

== Reception ==
Reception

Aggregate score
Aggregator	Score
Metacritic	75/100

Review scores
Publication	Score
Edge	8/10
Game Rant	9/10
The Jimquisition	8.5/10

The review aggregation website Metacritic, which uses a weighted average, assigned the video game a score of 75 out of 100, based on 6 critics, indicating "generally favorable" reviews.

James Stephanie Sterling of The Jimquisition rated Centum 8.5/10 and found it to be an engaging and thought-provoking point-and-click adventure that captivates with its disturbing imagery and insightful critique of generative AI, managing to balance mystery and clarity while leaving a lasting impression. Nick Rodriguez of Game Rant scored Centum a 9/10, praising the branching storyline and timely themes.

Edge Magazine offered a positive review and considered the game to be a brilliantly crafted and immersive adventure game that challenges players with its dark, oppressive atmosphere and unconventional puzzles, ultimately rewarding them with a deep exploration of the relationship between author and audience while showcasing remarkable imagination and creativity.

Giovanni Colantonio of Digital Trends had mixed feelings about the game's abstract storytelling, but praised the atmosphere. He wrote, "Maybe it's a little too obtuse for its own good, confusing long and cryptic writing for depth. Maybe. All I know is that it's currently holding a spot in my brain that few games occupy. It's tucked away in a distant lobe, the same one that's responsible for producing my most surreal dreams. It's a half-remembered nightmare that I'm trying my best to recall the next morning."
