= Cthulhu Saves the World =

2010 video game

- Developer: Zeboyd Games
- Publisher: Zeboyd Games
- Platforms: Xbox 360, Windows
- Genre: Turn-based role-playing video game
- Mode: Single-player

Cthulhu Saves the World is an indie turn-based role-playing video game developed and published by Zeboyd Games. It was released in 2010 for the Xbox 360's Xbox Live Arcade service, and in 2011 for Windows. It was later bundled with its predecessor, Breath of Death VII, as a compilation release. A parody resembling a retro 16-bit JRPG and based on the Cthulhu Mythos, the game stars the Great Old One Cthulhu as an antiheroic protagonist who is stopped by a wizard before he can destroy the world. He must become a "true hero" in order to break the spell and regain his evil powers. The game received favorable reviews from critics, and was a commercial success. It was praised for its value, but criticized for aspects of its gameplay.

== Reception ==
Reception

Aggregate score
Aggregator	Score
Metacritic	78/100

Review scores
Publication	Score
GamesRadar+	4.5/5 stars
IGN	8/10

John Walker of Rock Paper Shotgun said that his review "barely matter[ed]" at the price the game was selling for, calling it incredibly low for such a game. Stating that the "core idea" of the game was already enough to sell it, he noted that it was a "coherent, detailed RPG" despite being a parody, praising the variety of monsters as "extraordinary". He also remarked that the game's story was humorous and had a high level of detail to its world interactions. Despite this, he criticized the game's random encounters, saying that despite the fact that the game allowed the player to "clear out" an area by defeating a certain number of enemies, it still felt "arduous". He also called it too easy to run out of magic points, saying that it was not well-balanced.

Charles Onylett of IGN scored the game positively, saying that it paid JRPGs the utmost respect despite satirizing them, and describing it as a "heartfelt homage". He said that the game's references would only register to those who had both played games like Final Fantasy and were familiar with the writings of H. P. Lovecraft. He called the game a "great success" despite having only a "sliver of a target audience". Andrew Webster of GamesRadar+ also gave it a positive review, saying that despite being too linear and short, its visuals were charming and its writing "hilarious".

== Legacy ==
A prequel game, Cthulhu Saves Christmas, was released for Windows on December 23, 2019.
