= List of Nintendo Switch 2 games =

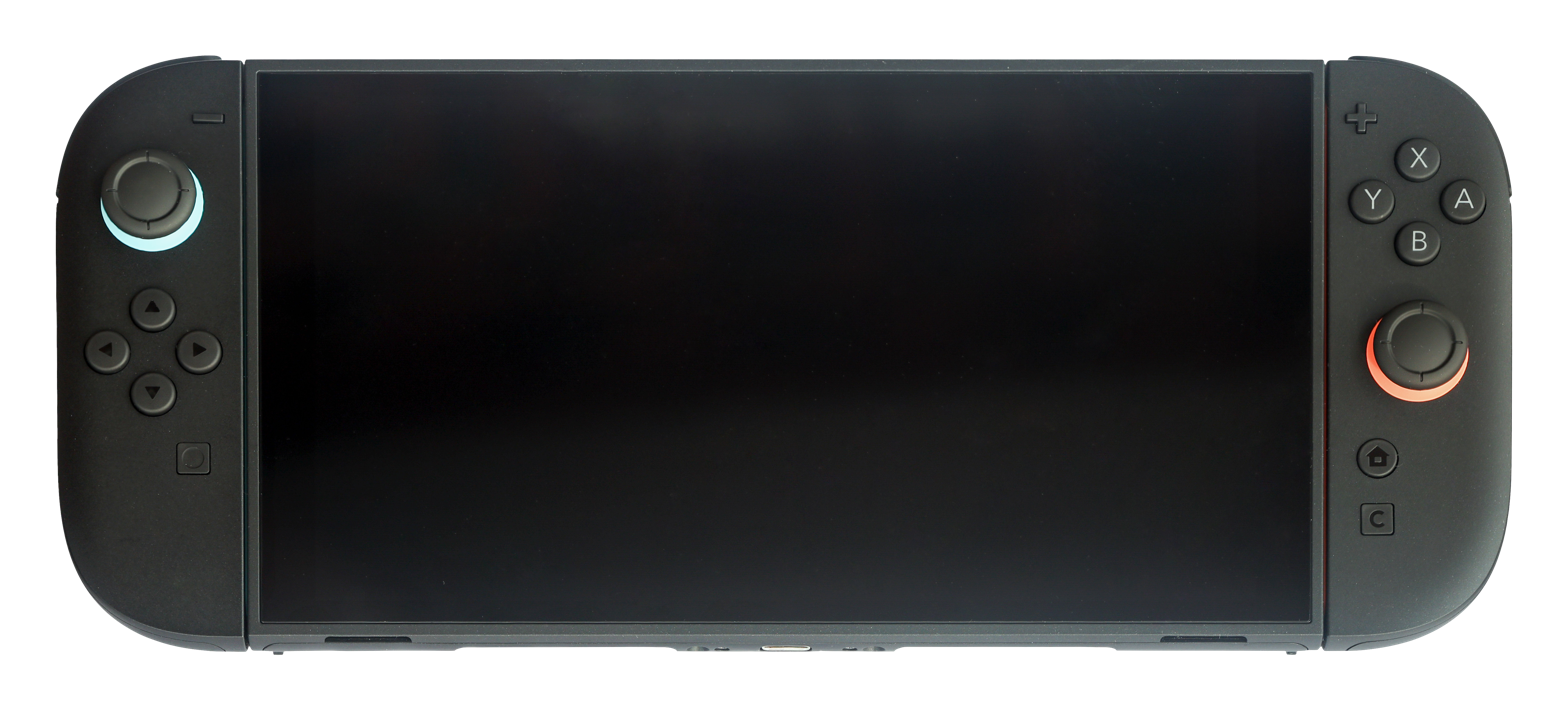
The Nintendo Switch 2 console in handheld mode, with Joy-Con 2 connected

The Nintendo Switch 2 is a video game console developed by Nintendo that serves as the successor to the Nintendo Switch. Like the original Switch, games are released both in physical and digital formats. Physical games are sold on cartridges that slot into the Switch 2 console unit. Digital games are purchased through the Nintendo eShop and stored either in the Switch 2's internal 256 GB of storage or on a microSD Express card. In addition to being backward compatible with most of the Switch games, the Switch 2 also supports Game-Key Cards, which require Internet connection for download before they can be played, as well as "Nintendo Switch 2 Edition" games, enhanced ports of Switch games that make use of the Switch 2's features.

There are currently 1042 (Note: This number is kept up to date by this script.) games in this list.

== List ==
List of Nintendo Switch 2 games
Title	Developer(s)	Publisher(s)	Release date	Ref.
007 First Light - Deluxe Edition	IO Interactive	IO Interactive	March 18, 2027	
1000xResist – Nintendo Switch 2 Edition	Sunset Visitor	Fellow Traveller Games	August 20, 2026	
1001 Threads of Mizan	MBC Game Studio	MBC Game Studio	2027	
13Z: The Zodiac Trials	Mixed Realms	Clouded Leopard Entertainment	January 14, 2027	
4PGP – Nintendo Switch 2 Edition	3goo	3goo	February 4, 2026	
A Game About Digging a Hole Together	Mipumi Games	Rokaplay Bou·tique, Drillhounds	December 4, 2026	
A Little to the Left Nintendo Switch 2 Edition	Max Inferno	Secret Mode	November 9, 2026	
A Tower Full of Cats	Devcats	Alchemy Games	October 28, 2026	
A-Train: All Aboard! Tourism – Nintendo Switch 2 Edition	Artdink	Artdink	December 18, 2025	
A-Train 9 Evolution	Artdink	Artdink	June 4, 2026	
Absolum – Nintendo Switch 2 Edition	Guard Crush Games, Supamonks	Dotemu	September 17, 2026	
Acornia: Mirror Worlds	Splashteam	The Arcade Crew	Q2 2027	
Adorable Adventures	Wild Sheep Studio	PQube	November 12, 2026	
The Adventures of Elliot: The Millennium Tales	Square Enix, Claytechworks	Square Enix	June 18, 2026	
Aeterna Lucis	Aeternum Game Studios	Aeternum Game Studios	December 3, 2026	
Aether Wizard Life	Vonder Games	Kinetic Publishing	Q3/Q4 2028	
Aethus	Pawsmonaut Games	Making Port	Q1/Q2 2027	
AFL 26	Big Ant Studios	Nacon	April 7, 2026	
Age Twisters	Piccolo Studio	Krafton	2027	
Akatori	Contrast Games	Contrast Games	2027	
Akiba Lost	IzanagiGames	IzanagiGames	September 17, 2026	
Alien: Isolation 2	Creative Assembly	Sega	TBA	
Alien: Rogue Incursion Evolved Edition	Survios	Survios	April 21, 2026	
Aliens: Fireteam Elite 2	Cold Iron Studios	Daybreak Game Company	Q1/Q2 2027	
The Alighieri Circle: Dante's Bloodline	One-O-One Games	Entalto Publishing	Q4 2026	
Alphadia I & II – Nintendo Switch 2 Edition	Exe-Create	Kemco	October 1, 2026	
Alphadia III – Nintendo Switch 2 Edition	Exe-Create	Kemco	November 19, 2026	
Alphadia F	Exe-Create	Kemco	Q4 2026	
Amanda the Adventurer 3	Mangledmaw Games	Dread XP	May 28, 2026	
Amnesia: Rebirth	Frictional Games	Abylight Studios	April 30, 2026	
Among Us Story: On Guard	Innersloth	Innersloth	February 17, 2027	
Ancestors: The Humankind Odyssey	Panache Digital Games	Fictions	December 8, 2026	
And Roger	TearyHand Studio	Kodansha	June 18, 2026	
The Angel Next Door Spoils Me Rotten: Memorial Vacation	Mages	Mages	July 23, 2026	
Anima: Gate of Memories 1 & 2 Remaster	Anima Project	Anima Publishing	2026	
Animal Crossing: New Horizons – Nintendo Switch 2 Edition	Nintendo EPD	Nintendo	January 15, 2026	
Animula Nook	LilliLandia	Tencent Games	TBA	
Anomalith	Winning Entertainment Group	FuRyu	October 28, 2026	
Another Crab's Treasure – Nintendo Switch 2 Edition	Aggro Crab	Aggro Crab	August 20, 2026	
Another Eden Begins – Nintendo Switch 2 Edition	Studio Prisma	Wright Flyer Studios	September 17, 2026	
Apex Legends	Respawn Entertainment, Iron Galaxy	Electronic Arts	August 5, 2025	
The Apothecary Diaries: The False Imperial Brother	Gust	Koei Tecmo	March 18, 2027	
Arcade Archives 2: Ace Driver	Namco	Hamster Corporation	May 28, 2026	
Arcade Archives 2: Ace Driver: Victory Lap	Namco	Hamster Corporation	October 22, 2026	
Arcade Archives 2: Adventure Canoe	Taito	Hamster Corporation	February 19, 2026	
Arcade Archives 2: Air Combat 22	Namco	Hamster Corporation	July 3, 2025	
Arcade Archives 2: Aqua Jet	Namco	Hamster Corporation	August 14, 2025	
Arcade Archives 2: Arkanoid	Taito	Hamster Corporation	May 7, 2026	
Arcade Archives 2: Arkanoid: Revenge of Doh	Taito	Hamster Corporation	September 3, 2026	
Arcade Archives 2: Armadillo Racing	Namco	Hamster Corporation	July 23, 2026	
Arcade Archives 2: Balloon Bomber	Taito	Hamster Corporation	October 1, 2026	
Arcade Archives 2: Battlantis	Konami	Hamster Corporation	October 9, 2025	
Arcade Archives 2: Bomb Bee	Namco	Hamster Corporation	November 20, 2025	
Arcade Archives 2: Bomb Jack Twin	Tehkan	Hamster Corporation	January 15, 2026	
Arcade Archives 2: Cameltry	Taito	Hamster Corporation	June 4, 2026	
Arcade Archives 2: Combat School	Konami	Hamster Corporation	August 6, 2026	
Arcade Archives 2: Crazy Balloon	Taito	Hamster Corporation	October 1, 2026	
Arcade Archives 2: Cyber Commando	Namco	Hamster Corporation	April 30, 2026	
Arcade Archives 2: Cyber Cycles	Namco	Hamster Corporation	August 20, 2026	
Arcade Archives 2: Dacholer	Nichibutsu	Hamster Corporation	September 17, 2026	
Arcade Archives 2: Devastators	Konami	Hamster Corporation	March 19, 2026	
Arcade Archives 2: Elevator Action	Taito	Hamster Corporation	November 5, 2026	
Arcade Archives 2: Exzisus	Taito	Hamster Corporation	November 5, 2026	
Arcade Archives 2: Final Lap	Namco	Hamster Corporation	March 26, 2026	
Arcade Archives 2: Galactic Warriors	Konami	Hamster Corporation	November 13, 2025	
Arcade Archives 2: Gee Bee	Namco	Hamster Corporation	October 2, 2025	
Arcade Archives 2: Hyper Crash	Konami	Hamster Corporation	July 9, 2026	
Arcade Archives 2: Karnov	Data East	Hamster Corporation	September 10, 2026	
Arcade Archives 2: Konami GT	Konami	Hamster Corporation	April 16, 2026	
Arcade Archives 2: Labyrinth Runner	Konami	Hamster Corporation	January 22, 2026	
Arcade Archives 2: Lady Bug	Universal Entertainment	Hamster Corporation	July 2, 2026	
Arcade Archives 2: Mach Breakers	Namco	Hamster Corporation	September 4, 2025	
Arcade Archives 2: Mega Zone	Konami	Hamster Corporation	February 12, 2026	
Arcade Archives 2: Midnight Landing	Taito	Hamster Corporation	October 23, 2025	
Arcade Archives 2: Moon Shuttle	Nichibutsu	Hamster Corporation	June 25, 2026	
Arcade Archives 2: Mouser	Universal Entertainment	Hamster Corporation	July 23, 2026	
Arcade Archives 2: Mr. Do!	Universal Entertainment	Hamster Corporation	May 15, 2026	
Arcade Archives 2: Mr. Do's Castle	Universal Entertainment	Hamster Corporation	September 17, 2026	
Arcade Archives 2: Ninja Emaki	Nichibutsu	Hamster Corporation	August 20, 2026	
Arcade Archives 2: The Outfoxies	Namco	Hamster Corporation	December 18, 2025	
Arcade Archives 2: Pinball Action	Tehkan	Hamster Corporation	August 13, 2026	
Arcade Archives 2: Plump Pop	Taito	Hamster Corporation	March 5, 2026	
Arcade Archives 2: Polaris	Taito	Hamster Corporation	April 9, 2026	
Arcade Archives 2: Quester	Namco	Hamster Corporation	January 29, 2026	
Arcade Archives 2: Rack 'Em Up	Konami	Hamster Corporation	June 11, 2026	
Arcade Archives 2: Rave Racer	Namco	Hamster Corporation	February 26, 2026	
Arcade Archives 2: Rezon	Allumer	Hamster Corporation	November 12, 2026	
Arcade Archives 2: Ridge Racer	Namco	Hamster Corporation	June 5, 2025	
Arcade Archives 2: Roc'n Rope	Konami	Hamster Corporation	December 11, 2025	
Arcade Archives 2: Scion	Seibu Kaihatsu	Hamster Corporation	October 30, 2025	
Arcade Archives 2: Scrambled Egg	Technōs Japan	Hamster Corporation	August 28, 2025	
Arcade Archives 2: Seicross	Nichibutsu	Hamster Corporation	November 19, 2026	
Arcade Archives 2: Shot Rider	Seibu Kaihatsu	Hamster Corporation	November 12, 2026	
Arcade Archives 2: Space Cyclone	Taito	Hamster Corporation	June 18, 2026	
Arcade Archives 2: Space Invaders	Taito	Hamster Corporation	December 25, 2025	
Arcade Archives 2: Space Invaders Part 2	Taito	Hamster Corporation	January 1, 2026	
Arcade Archives 2: Steel Worker	Taito	Hamster Corporation	September 18, 2025	
Arcade Archives 2: Stinger	Seibu Denshi	Hamster Corporation	October 15, 2026	
Arcade Archives 2: Swimmer	Tehkan	Hamster Corporation	October 29, 2026	
Arcade Archives 2: Syvalion	Taito	Hamster Corporation	July 16, 2026	
Arcade Archives 2: Tag Team Wrestling	Technōs Japan	Hamster Corporation	May 21, 2026	
Arcade Archives 2: Tatakae! Big Fighter	Nichibutsu	Hamster Corporation	May 28, 2026	
Arcade Archives 2: Tekken	Namco	Hamster Corporation	June 25, 2026	
Arcade Archives 2: Thundercade	SETA Corporation	Hamster Corporation	October 15, 2026	
Arcade Archives 2: Tokyo Wars	Namco	Hamster Corporation	November 6, 2025	
Arcade Archives 2: Top Speed	Taito	Hamster Corporation	February 5, 2026	
Arcade Archives 2: TX-1	Tatsumi	Hamster Corporation	July 30, 2026	
Arcade Archives 2: TX-1 V.8	Tatsumi	Hamster Corporation	November 19, 2026	
Arcade Archives 2: V'Ball	Technōs Japan	Hamster Corporation	August 13, 2026	
Arcade Archives 2: Video Hustler	Konami	Hamster Corporation	September 11, 2025	
Arcade Archives 2: Wiz	Seibu Kaihatsu	Hamster Corporation	September 3, 2026	
Arcade Archives 2: Xevious 3D/G	Namco	Hamster Corporation	September 24, 2026	
Arizona Sunshine	Vertigo Games	Vertigo Games	January 21, 2027	
Armatus	Counterplay Games	Fictions	January 7, 2027	
The Ascent Ultimate Edition	Neon Giant	Curve Digital, Krafton	December 2, 2026	
Asdivine Knot – Nintendo Switch 2 Edition	Exe-Create	Kemco	September 4, 2026	
Asphalt Legends – Nintendo Switch 2 Edition	Gameloft Barcelona	Gameloft	February 16, 2026	
Assassin's Creed Shadows	Ubisoft Quebec	Ubisoft	December 2, 2025	
Astonishia Story	Waycoder, Netmarble Neo	NIS America	February 11, 2027	
Astral Ascent – Nintendo Switch 2 Edition	Hibernian Workshop	MP2 Games	October 8, 2026	
Atelier Karia: The Night Kingdom & the Guide of Memories	Gust	Koei Tecmo	February 25, 2027	
Atelier Ryza: Ever Darkness & the Secret Hideout DX	Gust	Koei Tecmo	November 13, 2025	
Atelier Ryza 2: Lost Legends & the Secret Fairy DX	Gust	Koei Tecmo	November 13, 2025	
Atelier Ryza 3: Alchemist of the End & the Secret Key DX	Gust	Koei Tecmo	November 13, 2025	
Atelier Yumia: The Alchemist of Memories & the Envisioned Land – Nintendo Switch 2 Edition	Gust	Koei Tecmo	June 9, 2026	
Attack on Titan 3	Omega Force	Koei Tecmo	December 10, 2026	
Aurascope	Nick Oztok	Nick Oztok	TBA	
Avatar Legends: The Fighting Game	Gameplay Group International	PM Studios, Paramount Games Studio	October 29, 2026	
Ayakashi Fishing Folktails	Toybox	Imagineer	October 8, 2026	
Azure Striker Gunvolt Trilogy Enhanced – Nintendo Switch 2 Edition	Inti Creates	Inti Creates, Nighthawk Interactive	October 22, 2026	
Back to the Dawn	Metal Head Games	Clouded Leopard Entertainment, Spiral Up Games	March 5, 2026	
Backyard Baseball	Mega Cat Studios	Mega Cat Studios	TBA	
Bakudo	Sayil Games	Shueisha Games	2027	
Balatro	LocalThunk	Playstack	February 25, 2026	
Ball x Pit – Nintendo Switch 2 Edition	Kenny Sun	Devolver Digital	October 28, 2025	
Banchou Tactics: Lion Heart	Corecell Technology, Itsaraamata	Corecell Technology	September 10, 2026	
Bandit Trap	Picomy	PM Studios	April 30, 2026	
Bang! Bang! Bandits – Nintendo Switch 2 Edition	Nippon Columbia	Nippon Columbia	March 19, 2026	
Baptiste	Digital Dreams	Firenut Games	Q3/Q4 2026	
Barbie Rewind	Digital Eclipse	Atari	November 12, 2026	
Battle Spirits Crossover	FuRyu	FuRyu	October 7, 2026	
Becrowned	13th Street Games	Top Hat Studios	Q1 2027	
Bel's Fanfare	Chibig	Chibig	Q3/Q4 2027	
Bestiario	Wiggin Industries	SelectAPlay	TBA	
Beyblade X Evobattle Nintendo Switch 2 Edition	Groovebox Japan Co., Ltd.	FuRyu	December 18, 2025	
Beyond the Dark: Nightwatch	Atlantis Studio	Atlantis Studio	October 22, 2026	
Big Hops Together	Luckshot Games	Luckshot Games	December 24, 2026	
Big Walk	House House	Panic	August 4, 2026	
The Binding of Isaac: Repentance+	Edmund McMillen	Nicalis	November 19, 2026	
BioEden	Broken Arms Games	Focus Entertainment	September 3, 2026	
Bit Boy!! Arcade 2	Bplus	Bplus	TBA	
BlazBlue: Entropy Effect X – Nintendo Switch 2 Edition	91Act	Astrolabe Games	August 13, 2026	
Blighted	Drinkbox Studios	Drinkbox Studios	2027	
Blood: Refreshed Supply – Nintendo Switch 2 Edition	Monolith Productions, Nightdive Studios	Atari, Nightdive Studios, Warner Bros. Games	May 7, 2026	
Blood Dungeon – Nintendo Switch 2 Edition	Messhof	Messhof	August 25, 2026	
Bloomwalker	Netmarble Neo	Netmarble	TBA	
Blue Prince	Dogubomb	Raw Fury	March 3, 2026	
Blue Reflection Quartet	Gust	Koei Tecmo	July 30, 2026	
Bluey's Happy Snaps	Gameloft	Gameloft	October 15, 2026	
Bluey's Quest for the Gold Pen	Halfbrick Studios	PM Studios	May 28, 2026	
Bokura	Tokoronyori	Kodansha	July 29, 2026	
Bokura: planet	Tokoronyori	Kodansha	August 7, 2025	
Book Nook	Malapata Studio	Wings	TBA	
Borderlands 4	Gearbox Software	2K	TBA	
Botany Manor – Nintendo Switch 2 Edition	Balloon Studios	Whitethorn Games	July 2, 2026	
Braid, Anniversary Edition – Nintendo Switch 2 Edition	Thekla	Thekla	February 14, 2026	
Bravely Default: Flying Fairy HD Remaster	Cattle Call	Square Enix	June 5, 2025	
Brew & Dash	Boitata Games	Alchemy Games	December 11, 2026	
Brigandine: Abyss	Happinet Corporation	Happinet Corporation	August 27, 2026	
Broken Sword – Shadow of the Templars: Reforged – Nintendo Switch 2 Edition	Revolution Software	Revolution Software	November 12, 2025	
BrokenLore: Don't Play	Serafini Productions	Serafini Productions	TBA	
BrokenLore: Miki-Chan	Serafini Productions	Serafini Productions	2027	
Brotato – Nintendo Switch 2 Edition	Thomas Gervraud, Evil Empire	Seaven Studio	November 20, 2025	
Bubble Bobble 4 Friends: The Baron is Back! – Nintendo Switch 2 Edition + Stardrop Mountain	Taito	Clear River Games	February 25, 2027	
Bubsy 4D	Fabraz	Atari	May 22, 2026	
Bunraku	Electo Studios	Electo Studios	TBA	
Burger Bistro Story – Nintendo Switch 2 Edition	Kairosoft	Kairosoft	October 8, 2026	
Burggeist for Nintendo Switch 2	Ghrian Studio	Kodansha	October 27, 2026	
Cairn	The Game Bakers	The Game Bakers	Q1/Q2 2027	
Call of Duty: Modern Warfare 4	Infinity Ward, Digital Legends	Activision	October 23, 2026	
Call of Duty: Warzone	Infinity Ward, Raven Software	Activision	November 6, 2026	
Call of the Elder Gods	Out of the Blue	Kwalee	May 12, 2026	
Card & Casino	D3 Publisher	D3 Publisher	April 23, 2026	
Card-en-Ciel – Nintendo Switch 2 Edition	Inti Creates	Inti Creates	January 29, 2026	
Carmageddon: Rogue Shift	34BigThings	34BigThings	February 6, 2026	
Carpet Cleaning Simulator	DaimaGame	Regista	November 19, 2026	
Carrier Command 2	Geometa	Infogrames	TBA	
Cassette Beasts 2002	Bytten Studio	Raw Fury	March 2027	
Cast n Chill – Nintendo Switch 2 Edition	Wombat Brawler	Wombat Brawler	December 18, 2025	
Castle of Heart: Retold	7Levels	7Levels	TBA	
Castlebound	Ogre Pixel	Ogre Pixel	November 11, 2026	
Caves of Qud – Nintendo Switch 2 Edition	Freehold Games	Kitfox Games	TBA	
Chillin' by the Fire	Oink Games	Oink Games	July 31, 2025	
Chippy & Noppo – Nintendo Switch 2 Edition	peakvox	O-Two	April 30, 2026	
Chit Chat Party!	Alim	GungHo Online Entertainment	September 16, 2026	
Chivalware	Regal Pigeon	Dotemu	November 5, 2026	
ChromaGun 2: Dye Hard	Pixel Maniacs	PM Studios	February 12, 2026	
Citadelum	Abylight Barcelona	Abylight	January 22, 2026	
Cities: Skylines – Expanded Edition	Tantalus Media	Paradox Interactive	October 28, 2026	
Citizen Sleeper – Nintendo Switch 2 Edition	Jump Over the Age	Fellow Traveller	June 25, 2026	
Citizen Sleeper 2: Starward Vector – Nintendo Switch 2 Edition	Jump Over the Age	Fellow Traveller	June 25, 2026	
City Hunter	Sunsoft, Red Art Studios	Sunsoft, Clouded Leopard Entertainment	February 26, 2026	
City of None	Noel Berry, Liam Berry	Extremely OK Games	2027	
Clean Up Earth	Magic Pockets	Magic Pockets	TBA	
Clive Barker's Hellraiser: Revival	Boss Team Games	Saber Interactive	October 8, 2026	
CloverPit	Panik Arcade	Future Friends Games	August 13, 2026	
Coffee Talk Tokyo	Toge Productions, Chorus Worldwide	Chorus Worldwide	May 21, 2026	
Colorbound – Nintendo Switch 2 Edition	Panpipe Studios	Whitethorn Games	October 12, 2026	
Colors Live 2	Collecting Smiles	Collecting Smiles	TBA	
Commandos: Origins Deluxe Edition	Claymore Game Studios, Engine Software	Kalypso Media	December 15, 2026	
Console Archives: Bokosuka Wars	ASCII	Hamster Corporation	June 25, 2026	
Console Archives: Bubble Bobble	Taito	Hamster Corporation	August 26, 2026	
Console Archives: Chack'n Pop	Taito	Hamster Corporation	October 1, 2026	
Console Archives: The Conveni	Human Entertainment	Hamster Corporation	July 23, 2026	
Console Archives: The Conveni 2	Human Entertainment	Hamster Corporation	September 3, 2026	
Console Archives: Cool Boarders	UEP Systems	Hamster Corporation	February 5, 2026	
Console Archives: Crazy Climber	Jorudan, Nichibutsu	Hamster Corporation	September 17, 2026	
Console Archives: Dezaemon	Atena	Hamster Corporation	February 19, 2026	
Console Archives: Doraemon	Hudson Soft	Hamster Corporation	July 30, 2026	
Console Archives: The Drug Store	Human Entertainment	Hamster Corporation	October 15, 2026	
Console Archives: Elevator Action	Taito	Hamster Corporation	November 5, 2026	
Console Archives: The Firemen 2: Pete & Danny	Human Entertainment	Hamster Corporation	November 19, 2026	
Console Archives: Firework Thrower Kantaro's 53 Stations of the Tokaido	Sunsoft	Hamster Corporation	June 4, 2026	
Console Archives: Geki-Oh ShienRyu	Warashi	Hamster Corporation	May 28, 2026	
Console Archives: Hercules no Eikou II: Taitan no Metsubou	Data East	Hamster Corporation	July 16, 2026	
Console Archives: Ishin no Arashi	Koei	Hamster Corporation	April 16, 2026	
Console Archives: Karate Champ	Data East	Hamster Corporation	September 24, 2026	
Console Archives: L'Empereur	Koei	Hamster Corporation	June 11, 2026	
Console Archives: The Legend of Kage	Taito	Hamster Corporation	June 18, 2026	
Console Archives: MagMax	Nichibutsu	Hamster Corporation	May 7, 2026	
Console Archives: Marl Jong	Nippon Ichi Software	Hamster Corporation	October 29, 2026	
Console Archives: Master of Monsters: Disciples of Gaia	SystemSoft	Hamster Corporation	May 14, 2026	
Console Archives: Monster Rancher Hop A Bout	Tecmo	Hamster Corporation	TBA	
Console Archives: Ninja Gaiden II: The Dark Sword of Chaos	Tecmo	Hamster Corporation	February 5, 2026	
Console Archives: Ninja Gaiden III: The Ancient Ship of Doom	Tecmo	Hamster Corporation	April 23, 2026	
Console Archives: Ninja-Kid II	APL	Hamster Corporation	March 19, 2026	
Console Archives: Nobunaga Oda Den	Koei	Hamster Corporation	November 12, 2026	
Console Archives: Nobunaga's Ambition	Koei	Hamster Corporation	March 5, 2026	
Console Archives: Nobunaga's Ambition II	Koei	Hamster Corporation	September 10, 2026	
Console Archives: Raiden Project	Seibu Kaihatsu	Hamster Corporation	October 22, 2026	
Console Archives: Rhapsody: A Musical Adventure	Nippon Ichi Software	Hamster Corporation	July 9, 2026	
Console Archives: Rhapsody II: Ballad of the Little Princess	Nippon Ichi Software	Hamster Corporation	August 20, 2026	
Console Archives: Ripple Island	Sunsoft	Hamster Corporation	October 8, 2026	
Console Archives: Rohga: Armor Force	Data East	Hamster Corporation	April 30, 2026	
Console Archives: Seicross	Nichibutsu	Hamster Corporation	April 9, 2026	
Console Archives: Sonic Wings Special	Video System	Hamster Corporation	March 12, 2026	
Console Archives: T.R.A.G.: Tactical Rescue Assault Group - Mission of Mercy	Sunsoft	Hamster Corporation	July 2, 2026	
Console Archives: Terra Cresta	Nichibutsu	Hamster Corporation	March 26, 2026	
Console Archives: Toujinmakyouden Hercules no eikou	Data East	Hamster Corporation	May 21, 2026	
Console Archives: Touki Denshou Angel Eyes	Tecmo	Hamster Corporation	August 13, 2026	
Console Archives: UFO: A Day in the Life	ASCII	Hamster Corporation	August 6, 2026	
Constance	btf Games	btf Games, ByteRockers' Games, Parco Games	July 30, 2026	
Contact Protocol	Cold Zephyr Games	Kinetic Publishing	Q2 2027	
Content Warning	Wilnyl, Philip, thePetHen, Skog, Zorro	Landfall	April 1, 2026	
The Convenience Store	Chilla's Art	Regista	September 24, 2026	
Cookie Clicker	DashNet	Playsaurus	TBA	
Coral Island	Stairway Games	Balor Games	December 7, 2026	
Core Keeper – Nintendo Switch 2 Edition	Pugstorm	Fireshine Games	January 28, 2026	
Cotton Reboot!	Rocket-Engine	Clear River Games	October 22, 2026	
Cotton Rock with You: Oriental Night Dreams	Success	Success	August 6, 2026	
Cozy Grove – Nintendo Switch 2 Edition	Spry Fox	The Quantum Astrophysicists Guild	March 12, 2026	
Cozy Grove: Camp Spirit – Nintendo Switch 2 Edition	Spry Fox	The Quantum Astrophysicists Guild	July 15, 2026	
Crazy Taxi: World Tour	Sega	Sega	2027	
Crescent County	Electric Saint	Kinetic Publishing	Q2/Q3 2027	
The Crew Motorfest	Ubisoft Ivory Tower	Ubisoft	October 8, 2026	
Crisis Core: Final Fantasy VII Reunion	Square Enix, Tose	Square Enix	September 9, 2026	
Croc: Legend of the Gobbos Platinum Edition – Nintendo Switch 2 Edition	Titanium Studios, Big Boat Interactive	Argonaut Games, PM Studios, Strictly Limited Games	2027	
Croc 2: Kingdom of the Gobbos – Nintendo Switch 2 Edition	Titanium Studios	Argonaut Games, PM Studios, Strictly Limited Games	2027	
Cronos: The New Dawn	Bloober Team	Bloober Team	September 5, 2025	
Crymelight	FuRyu	FuRyu	November 4, 2026	
Culdcept Begins – Nintendo Switch 2 Edition	Neos Corporation	Neos Corporation	July 16, 2026	
Cult of the Lamb – Nintendo Switch 2 Edition	Massive Monster	Devolver Digital	October 22, 2026	
Cultic: Complete Edition	Jasozz Games	Atari, Infogrames	TBA	
Curse of Resthaven	Hilltop Studios	Digital Bandidos	November 12, 2026	
Cyberpunk 2077: Ultimate Edition	CD Projekt Red	CD Projekt	June 5, 2025	
Cytus II	Esquadra	Flyhigh Works	2027	
D-topia	Marumittu Games	Annapurna Interactive	July 14, 2026	
Daemon X Machina: Titanic Scion	Marvelous First Studio	Marvelous	September 5, 2025	
Daisenryaku SSB2	SystemSoft Beta	SystemSoft Beta	February 26, 2026	
Damon and Baby	Arc System Works	Arc System Works	TBA	
Danganronpa 2×2	Gemdrops, Too Kyo Games, Spike Chunsoft	Spike Chunsoft	January 14, 2027	
Dark Auction – Nintendo Switch 2 Edition	IzanagiGames	Good Smile Company	June 10, 2026	
Darkest Dungeon II: Nintendo Switch 2 Edition	Red Hook Studios	Red Hook Studios	October 22, 2026	
Darwin's Paradox!	ZeDrimeTim	Konami	April 2, 2026	
Dave the Diver – Nintendo Switch 2 Edition	Mintrocket	Mintrocket	November 6, 2025	
Dawngazer	Monochrome Corporation	Good Smile Company	2028	
DayZ: Cool Edition	Bohemia Interactive	Bohemia Interactive	August 20, 2026	
Dead Age 2	Silent Dreams	Headup Games	August 18, 2026	
Deadzone Rogue	Prophecy Games	Prophecy Games	March 17, 2026	
Dear me, I was...	Arc System Works	Arc System Works	July 31, 2025	
Decapolice	Level-5	Level-5	2027	
Deck of Haunts	Mantis Games	Dangen Entertainment	October 8, 2026	
Decollate Decoration	Kanekodo	Kemco	July 16, 2026	
Deep Rock Galactic: Survivor – Nintendo Switch 2 Edition	Funday Games	Ghost Ship Publishing	October 9, 2026	
Deltarune	Toby Fox	8-4	June 5, 2025	
Delve Survivors	Idioslab	NGJ Corporation	January 21, 2027	
Demeo x Dungeons & Dragons: Battlemarked	Resolution Games	Resolution Games	June 16, 2026	
Demi and the Fractured Dream	Yarn Owl	Annapurna Interactive	February 2027	
Demon Castle Story – Nintendo Switch 2 Edition	Kairosoft	Kairosoft	April 9, 2026	
Demon Slayer: Kimetsu no Yaiba – The Hinokami Chronicles 2 – Nintendo Switch 2 Edition	CyberConnect2	Sega	October 29, 2026	
Demonschool	Necrosoft Games	Ysbryd Games	2026	
Denshattack!	Undercoders	Fireshine Games	July 15, 2026	
Depth Loop	Kemco	Kemco	2026	
Derby Stallion 2	ParityBit	Game Addict	September 24, 2026	
Descenders	RageSquid	No More Robots	TBA	
Desolus	Mark J. Mayers	The Quantum Astrophysicists Guild	October 15, 2026	
Destroy All Humans!	Black Forest Games	THQ Nordic	June 23, 2026	
Destroy All Humans! 2: Reprobed	Black Forest Games	THQ Nordic	September 15, 2026	
Devil May Cry 5 Devil Hunter Edition	Capcom	Capcom	June 23, 2026	
Diablo IV: Age of Hatred Collection	Blizzard Entertainment	Blizzard Entertainment	September 15, 2026	
Dicevaders	Pengonauts	Playstack	September 29, 2026	
Digimon Story: Time Stranger	Media.Vision	Bandai Namco Entertainment	July 10, 2026	
Dinkum – Nintendo Switch 2 Edition	James Bendon	Krafton	April 22, 2026	
Disgaea 7 Complete	Nippon Ichi Software	NIS America	October 10, 2025	
Disgaea Mayhem	Nippon Ichi Software	NIS America	January 29, 2026	
The Disney Afternoon Collection	Digital Eclipse	Atari	February 26, 2026	
Disney Dreamlight Valley – Nintendo Switch 2 Edition	Gameloft Montreal	Gameloft	March 25, 2026	
Disney Speedstorm – Nintendo Switch 2 Edition	Gameloft Barcelona	Gameloft	July 15, 2026	
Dispatch – Nintendo Switch 2 Edition	AdHoc Studio, PlayEveryWare	AdHoc Studio	January 28, 2026	
Divinity: Original Sin II – Nintendo Switch 2 Edition	Larian Studios	Larian Studios	December 15, 2025	
Dogpile	Studio Folly, Toot Games, Foot	Wings	August 20, 2026	
Dokapon Kingdom: Connect 2	Sting	Compile Heart, Idea Factory International	Q2/Q3 2027	
Donkey Kong Bananza	Nintendo EPD	Nintendo	July 17, 2025	
Dosa Divas	Outerloop Games	Outerloop Games	April 14, 2026	
Drag x Drive	Nintendo EPD	Nintendo	August 14, 2025	
Dragon Ball: Sparking! Zero	Spike Chunsoft	Bandai Namco Entertainment	November 14, 2025	
Dragon Quest I & II HD-2D Remake	Square Enix, Artdink, Square Enix Creative Studio V	Square Enix	October 30, 2025	
Dragon Quest VII Reimagined	Square Enix, HexaDrive	Square Enix	February 5, 2026	
Dragon Quest XI S: Echoes of an Elusive Age – Definitive Edition	Square Enix	Square Enix	September 24, 2026	
Dragon Quest Heroes: Torneko's Mystery Dungeon -Classic HD-	Square Enix	Square Enix	September 9, 2026	
Dragon Quest Monsters: The Withered World	Square Enix	Square Enix	December 3, 2026	
Dragon Ruins II: Aftermath	Exe-Create	Kemco	Q4 2026	
Dragon's Dogma 2: Dark Arisen	Capcom	Capcom	October 9, 2026	
Draw King	Takahiro Miyazawa	Takahiro Miyazawa	February 5, 2026	
Dread Delusion	Lovely Hellspace	DreadXP	March 17, 2026	
Dream Shogi 4K	Silverstar	Silverstar	February 12, 2026	
Dream Town Island – Nintendo Switch 2 Edition	Kairosoft	Kairosoft	May 21, 2026	
The Drifter – Nintendo Switch 2 Edition	Powerhoof	Powerhoof	June 22, 2026	
Dumb Ways to Party	PlaySide Studios	PlaySide Studios	2026	
Dumpster Gang	Coyote House Games	Curve Games	March 2027	
DuneCrawl	Alientrap	Alientrap	2026	
Dungeon Village 2 – Nintendo Switch 2 Edition	Kairosoft	Kairosoft	July 23, 2026	
Dungeons of Dusk	68k Studios	New Blood Interactive	2026	
The Duskbloods	FromSoftware	FromSoftware, Nintendo	2027	
Duskfade	Weird Beluga Games	Fireshine Games	August 13, 2026	
Dynasty Warriors 3: Complete Edition Remastered	Omega Force	Koei Tecmo	October 1, 2026	
Dynasty Warriors: Origins	Omega Force	Koei Tecmo	January 22, 2026	
EA Sports FC 26	EA Vancouver, EA Romania	EA Sports	September 26, 2025	
EA Sports FC 27	EA Vancouver, EA Romania	EA Sports	September 25, 2026	
Earth Defense Force 5 for Nintendo Switch 2	Sandlot	D3 Publisher	October 8, 2026	
Earth Defense Force 6	Sandlot	D3 Publisher	January 28, 2027	
Echo Weaver	Moonlight Kids	Akupara Games	October 8, 2026	
Echoes: A Transmission Story	Hashcode Digital	Super Rare Originals	TBA	
eFootball Kick Off!	Konami	Konami	June 3, 2026	
Elden Ring: Tarnished Edition	FromSoftware	FromSoftware, Bandai Namco Entertainment	August 28, 2026	
The Elder Scrolls IV: Oblivion Remastered	Virtuos; Bethesda Game Studios	Bethesda Softworks	August 11, 2026	
The Elder Scrolls V: Skyrim Anniversary Edition	Bethesda Game Studios, Iron Galaxy	Bethesda Softworks	December 9, 2025	
The Eminence in Shadow: Phantom Echoes	Aiming, Team Caravan	Aiming, Clouded Leopard Entertainment, NIS America	2027	
Ending the Happy Route	Water Phoenix	Kemco	January 29, 2026	
Enter the Gungeon 2	Dodge Roll	Devolver Digital	2026	
Epic Mickey: Rebrushed	Purple Lamp Studios	THQ Nordic	October 6, 2026	
Eriksholm: The Stolen Dream	River End Games	Nordcurrent	December 3, 2026	
The Escapists 3	Team17	Team17	2027	
Escape the Backrooms	Blackbird Interactive	Secret Mode	July 7, 2026	
Eternal Anima	Marvelous Europe	Marvelous	March 4, 2027	
EthrA	StoneLab Games	StoneLab Games	TBA	
Everbloom	Torbie	Fictions	Q2 2027	
Everspace 2 - Galactic Edition	Rockfish Games	Rockfish Games	August 12, 2026	
Everything is Crab – Nintendo Switch 2 Edition	Odd Dreams Digital	Secret Mode	January 26, 2027	
The Exit 8 – Nintendo Switch 2 Edition	Kotake Create	Kotake Create	August 29, 2025	
Exit Lab: 15 Rooms	Intense	Intense	February 26, 2026	
Exstetra	Studio Saizensen	FuRyu	September 2, 2026	
Factorio – Nintendo Switch 2 Edition	Wube Software	Wube Software	December 22, 2025	
Fading Echo	Emeteria	New Tales	September 17, 2026	
Fall Up	Unicellular Games	Astrolabe Games	December 3, 2026	
Fallen Fates	Hibernian Workshop	Hibernian Workshop	TBA	
Fallout 4: Anniversary Edition	Bethesda Game Studios	Bethesda Softworks	February 24, 2026	
Fangtopia	Absolutely Games	Secret Mode	October 26, 2026	
Fantasy Boy	Serafini Productions	Serafini Productions	TBA	
Fantasy Life i: The Girl Who Steals Time – Nintendo Switch 2 Edition	Level-5	Level-5	June 5, 2025	
Far Cry 3 Classic Edition	Ubisoft Montreal	Ubisoft	Q2 2027	
Far Cry 3: Blood Dragon Classic Edition	Ubisoft Montreal	Ubisoft	Q2 2027	
Faraway	Steph Thirion	Annapurna Interactive	November 5, 2026	
Farming Simulator: Signature Edition	Giants Software	Giants Software	December 9, 2025	
Fast Fusion	Shin'en Multimedia	Shin'en Multimedia	June 5, 2025	
Fatal Frame II: Crimson Butterfly Remake	Team Ninja	Koei Tecmo	March 12, 2026	
Fatal Fury: City of the Wolves	KOF Studio	SNK	October 22, 2026	
Fate/Extra Record	Type-Moon Studio BB, Meteorise	Aniplex, Xseed Games	January 28, 2027	
Figment 1	Bedtime Digital	Bedtime Digital	November 19, 2026	
Figment 2	Bedtime Digital	Bedtime Digital	November 19, 2026	
Final Fantasy VII Rebirth	Square Enix Creative Business Unit I	Square Enix	June 3, 2026	
Final Fantasy VII Remake Intergrade	Square Enix Creative Business Unit I	Square Enix	January 22, 2026	
Final Fantasy VII Revelation	Square Enix Creative Business Unit I	Square Enix	April 8, 2027	
Final Fantasy X/X-2 HD Remaster	Square Enix 1st Production Department, Virtuos	Square Enix	July 23, 2026	
Final Fantasy XIV	Square Enix Creative Studio III	Square Enix	August 4, 2026	
Final Fantasy Resonance	Square Enix, Lancarse	Square Enix	October 22, 2026	
Final Fantasy Tactics: The Ivalice Chronicles – Nintendo Switch 2 Edition	Square Enix Creative Business Unit III	Square Enix	September 30, 2025	
Fire Emblem: Fortune's Weave	Intelligent Systems	Nintendo	September 17, 2026	
Fitness Boxing: Touken Ranbu – Shutsujin! Exercise Honmaru	Imagineer	Imagineer	January 15, 2027	
Fitness Boxing 3: Your Personal Trainer – Nintendo Switch 2 Edition	Imagineer	Nintendo	July 16, 2026	
Floor Plan: Slap Out of It! – Nintendo Switch 2 Edition	Turbo Button	Turbo Button	Q2 2027	
The Florist	Unclear Games	Unclear Games	2026	
Forever Ago	Third Shift	Annapurna Interactive	October 8, 2026	
Fortnite	Epic Games	Epic Games	June 5, 2025	
Fountains – Nintendo Switch 2 Edition	John Pywell	Crunching Koalas	September 24, 2026	
The Fox's Way Home – Nintendo Switch 2 Edition	BeXide	BeXide	February 26, 2026	
Frog Sqwad	Panic Stations	Panic Stations	October 28, 2026	
Fruit Mountain Party – Nintendo Switch 2 Edition	BeXide	BeXide	April 23, 2026	
Full Metal Schoolgirl	Yuke's	D3 Publisher	October 23, 2025	
Funguys Swarm	Stairway Games	Stairway Games	August 25, 2026	
FZ: Formation Z	Granzella	Clear River Games	May 21, 2026	
Gal Guardians: Servants of the Dark	Inti Creates	Inti Creates	January 28, 2027	
Game Dev Story – Nintendo Switch 2 Edition	Kairosoft	Kairosoft	June 25, 2026	
Gear.Club Unlimited 3	Eden Games	Nacon	February 19, 2026	
Gecko Gods	Inresin	Super Rare Originals	June 25, 2026	
Girls und Panzer: All-Star Tank Carnival	D3 Publisher	D3 Publisher	March 25, 2027	
Girls und Panzer Hakunetsu! Mahjong Tag Battle Desu!	Mages	Mages	2027	
Glaciered	Studio Snowblind	Playism	2026	
Glow Box	Monthly Wetland	Waku Waku Games	October 29, 2026	
Go-Go Town! – Nintendo Switch 2 Edition	Prideful Sloth	Prideful Sloth	July 16, 2026	
Goat Simulator 3	Coffee Stain North	Coffee Stain Publishing	April 1, 2026	
Gobble	Nippon Ichi Software	NIS America	September 23, 2026	
Gobliiins Collection	Red Art Games	Red Art Games	August 6, 2026	
Goblin Cleanup	Crisalu Games	Team17	2027	
Godzilla: Destroy All Monsters Melee - Remastered	Pipeworks Software	Atari	November 3, 2026	
Golf With Your Friends 2	Radical Forge	Team17	2026	
Goodnight Universe	Nice Dream	Skybound Games	November 11, 2025	
Gothic III Classic	Piranha Bytes	THQ Nordic	November 24, 2026	
Granblue Fantasy: Relink - Endless Ragnarok	Osaka Cygames	Cygames	July 9, 2026	
Granblue Fantasy Versus: Rising Legendary Edition	Arc System Works	Cygames	September 16, 2026	
Gravastar	Studio Atma	Studio Atma	TBA	
Graveyard Keeper II	Lazy Bear Games	tinyBuild	September 22, 2026	
Gravity Circuit 2	Domesticated Ants Games	Dear Villagers	Q2 2027	
The Great Villainess: Strategy of Lily	Alliance Arts, One or Eight, WSS Playground	Alliance Arts	December 2, 2026	
GRID Legends: Deluxe Edition	Codemasters	Feral Interactive	January 29, 2026	
Grim Trials	Glory Jam	Softsource	August 20, 2026	
Grime II	Clover Bite	Kwalee	November 26, 2026	
The Grimm Reapress and the Drearytale Monster	Nippon Ichi Software	NIS America	April 30, 2026	
Ground Zero Hero	Rowan Edmondson	Acclaim Entertainment	August 20, 2026	
Gunvolt Chronicles: Luminous Avenger iX 1+2 Dual Collection – Nintendo Switch 2 Edition	Inti Creates	Inti Creates	July 9, 2026	
Gunvolt Chronicles: Luminous Avenger iX 3	Inti Creates	Inti Creates	2027	
Hades II – Nintendo Switch 2 Edition	Supergiant Games	Supergiant Games	September 25, 2025	
Handy Hockey	ITL	ITL	July 31, 2025	
Harold Halibut	Slow Bros.	Slow Bros.	November 12, 2026	
Harvest Moon: Echoes of Teradea – Nintendo Switch 2 Edition	Appci Corporation	Natsume Inc.	October 15, 2026	
Hasbro Games Junior Collection	Casual Brothers	Outright Games	November 6, 2026	
Haste	Landfall	Landfall	April 1, 2026	
Hatsune Miku: Starry Party	Good Smile Company	Good Smile Company	2027	
Haunted Paws	LazyFlock	LazyFlock	May 2027	
Heartworm	Vincent Adinolfi	DreadXP	October 1, 2026	
Heave Ho 2	Le Cartel Studio	Devolver Digital	July 16, 2026	
Hela: of Mice & Magic	Windup Games	Knight's Peak	December 1, 2026	
Hell Is Us	Rogue Factor	Nacon	October 8, 2026	
Hello Kitty and Friends: Freeze Tag Party	Imagineer	Imagineer	November 26, 2026	
Hello Kitty Island Adventure – Nintendo Switch 2 Edition	Sunblink	Sunblink	November 13, 2025	
Hello Kitty Party Land	G-Style	Bandai Namco Entertainment	October 29, 2026	
Herdling – Nintendo Switch 2 Edition	Okomotive	Panic Inc.	November 12, 2026	
High on Life – Nintendo Switch 2 Edition	Squanch Games	Squanch Games	August 28, 2025	
High on Life 2	Squanch Games	Squanch Games	July 1, 2026	
Hitman: Absolution – Nintendo Switch 2 Edition	IO Interactive	Feral Interactive	October 22, 2026	
Hitman: World of Assassination – Signature Edition	IO Interactive	IO Interactive	June 5, 2025	
Hoa 2	Skrollcat Studio	PM Studios	2026	
Hoarder	Byzel	Awaken Realms	2027	
Hogwarts Legacy	Avalanche Software, Shiver Entertainment	Warner Bros. Games	June 5, 2025	
Hollow Knight – Nintendo Switch 2 Edition	Team Cherry	Team Cherry	February 5, 2026	
Hollow Knight: Silksong – Nintendo Switch 2 Edition	Team Cherry	Team Cherry	September 4, 2025	
hololive Treasure Mountain MegaPack – Nintendo Switch 2 Edition	BeXide	CCMC	September 17, 2026	
holoVillage: Our Cozy Days	Roboqlo	Holo Indie	October 21, 2026	
Holy Horror Mansion	Level-5	Level-5	2027	
Homura Hime	Crimson Dusk	Playism	2027	
Hoshin Engi Re:surrection	Lastwonder	Shueisha Games	2027	
Hot Wheels: Infinite Rush	Milestone	Milestone	September 10, 2026	
Hotel Barcelona	White Owls Inc.	Dark Product	TBA	
House Flipper 2	Frozen District, Empyrean	Frozen District	October 15, 2026	
Human: Fall Flat – Nintendo Switch 2 Edition	No Brake Games	Curve Digital	March 19, 2026	
Human: Fall Flat 2	No Brakes Games	Devolver Digital	TBA	
Humblets	Berry Bite	HypeTrain Digital	TBA	
Hunter's Moon: A Sovereign Syndicate Adventure	Crimson Herring Studios	Zugalu Entertainment	TBA	
Hyperspace Neptunia: Unlimited	Compile Heart	Idea Factory	August 27, 2026	
Hyperyuki: Snowboard Syndicate	Wabisabi Games	Acclaim Entertainment	Q1/Q2 2027	
Hyrule Warriors: Age of Calamity - Definitive Edition	Omega Force	Koei Tecmo, Nintendo	February 25, 2027	
Hyrule Warriors: Age of Imprisonment	AAA Games Studio	Koei Tecmo, Nintendo	November 6, 2025	
I Am Your Beast	Strange Scaffold	Strange Scaffold	October 20, 2026	
The Idolmaster SideM	D3 Publisher	Bandai Namco Entertainment	TBA	
The Immortal John Triptych	Joe Richardson Games	Akupara Games	August 27, 2026	
Inazuma Eleven RE	Level-5	Level-5	2026	
Inazuma Eleven: Victory Road – Nintendo Switch 2 Edition	Level-5	Level-5	November 13, 2025	
Indiana Jones and the Great Circle	MachineGames	Bethesda Softworks	May 12, 2026	
Industria	Bleakmill	Headup Games	October 19, 2026	
Infinite Alliance	Critical Games	Electric Airship	2026	
InKonbini: One Store. Many Stories	Beep Japan Inc.	Nagai Industries	April 30, 2026	
Into the Dead: Our Darkest Days	PikPok	PikPok	March 2027	
Ira	ABShot	Nicalis, Pikii	July 30, 2026	
Isekai Rondo – Nintendo Switch 2 Edition	Exe-Create	Kemco	January 22, 2026	
Isekai Villain – Nintendo Switch 2 Edition	Exe-Create	Kemco	June 4, 2026	
It Takes Two	Hazelight Studios, Turn Me Up Games	Electronic Arts	October 15, 2026	
Jaden Industries: Cozy Automation Puzzler	Pushka Studios	Pushka Interactive Studios	November 23, 2026	
The James Pond Legacy: The Pond Is Not Enough	System 3 Software	System 3 Software	January 15, 2027	
Jenny LeClue - Detectivu	Mografi	Mografi	September 7, 2026	
Joe & Mac Retro Collection	Red Art Games	Red Art Games	October 29, 2026	
Jotunnslayer: Hordes of Hel	Games Farm, Artillery	Grindstone	July 30, 2026	
Jujutsu Kaisen Rumble: Survivation	poncle	Shueisha Games	2027	
Jumbo Airport Story – Nintendo Switch 2 Edition	Kairosoft	Kairosoft	August 6, 2026	
Junkster	Stormcloud Games	Stormcloud Games	June 16, 2026	
Jurassic World Evolution 2: Complete Edition	Frontier Developments	Frontier Developments	July 30, 2026	
Just Dance: Decades of Hits – Nintendo Switch 2 Edition	Ubisoft	Ubisoft	November 10, 2026	
Katuba's Poacher	Joe Yu	Red Dunes Games	TBA	
Kemono Teatime	Studio Lalala	Studio Lalala	TBA	
Kena: Bridge of Spirits	Ember Lab	Ember Lab	March 26, 2026	
Kernel Hearts	Ephemera	Whitethorn Games	September 17, 2026	
Kingdom Come: Deliverance II Royal Edition	Warhorse Studios	Deep Silver	2027	
Kingdom III: Rising Realms	Fury Studios	Raw Fury	2027	
Kingdom Hearts HD 1.5 + 2.5 Remix	Square Enix	Square Enix	October 8, 2026	
Kingdom Hearts HD 2.8 Final Chapter Prologue	Square Enix	Square Enix	October 8, 2026	
Kingdom Hearts III	Square Enix	Square Enix	October 8, 2026	
Kingdom Hearts IV	Square Enix	Square Enix	Q3/Q4 2027	
Kingdom's Return: Time-Eating Fruit and the Ancient Monster – Nintendo Switch 2 Edition	Inti Creates	Inti Creates	April 23, 2026	
Kinki Spiritual Affairs Bureau	Noto Muteki	Amata Games	July 29, 2026	
Kirby Air Riders	Bandai Namco Studios, Sora Ltd.	Nintendo	November 20, 2025	
Kirby and the Forgotten Land – Nintendo Switch 2 Edition + Star-Crossed World	HAL Laboratory	Nintendo	August 28, 2025	
Kirby and the World Beyond	HAL Laboratory	Nintendo	Q2 2027	
Kitaria Fables 2	Secret Level Studios	PQube	Q2 2027	
Kitsune: The Journey of Adashino	Rias	Room6, yokaze	Q2 2027	
KochiKame: Ryo-san's Billion-yen Beat	Kairosoft	Shueisha Games	TBA	
Kokutoto	Tenda Games	Tenda Games	June 24, 2026	
KuloNiku: Bowl Up!	Gambir Studio	Raw Fury	November 25, 2026	
Kunitsu-Gami: Path of the Goddess	Capcom	Capcom	June 5, 2025	
Kuukiyomi 4: Consider It Nintendo Switch 2 Edition	G-Mode	G-Mode	September 18, 2025	
Kyoto Xanadu	Nihon Falcom	Nihon Falcom	July 16, 2026	
The Last Salvage Squad	Sunfish Kumano	Waku Waku Games	June 18, 2026	
Layers of Fear: Final Masterpiece Edition	Bloober Team	Bloober Team	December 19, 2025	
The Legend of Heroes: Trails Beyond the Horizon	Nihon Falcom	NIS America	January 15, 2026	
The Legend of Heroes: Trails from Zero	Nihon Falcom	NIS America	September 10, 2026	
The Legend of Heroes: Trails to Azure	Nihon Falcom	NIS America	September 10, 2026	
The Legend of Zelda: Breath of the Wild – Nintendo Switch 2 Edition	Nintendo EPD	Nintendo	June 5, 2025	
The Legend of Zelda: Ocarina of Time	Nintendo EPD	Nintendo	November 5, 2026	
The Legend of Zelda: Tears of the Kingdom – Nintendo Switch 2 Edition	Nintendo EPD	Nintendo	June 5, 2025	
Lego Batman: Legacy of the Dark Knight	Traveller's Tales	Warner Bros. Games	September 18, 2026	
Lego Harry Potter Collection	Traveller's Tales, Double Eleven, Cast Iron Games	Warner Bros. Games	October 16, 2026	
Lego Party – Nintendo Switch 2 Edition	SMG Studio	Fictions	July 30, 2026	
Lego Skylines	Iceflake Studios	Paradox Interactive	2027	
Lego Voyagers	Light Brick Studio	Annapurna Interactive	September 15, 2025	
Leingham Tavern Story: Alan and the Time Goddess	Exe-Create	Kemco	Q2 2027	
Lelu	Electronic Sheep Games	Super Rare Originals	January 21, 2027	
Let's Sing 2027	Voxler	THQ Nordic	November 3, 2026	
Let's Sing ABBA	Voxler	THQ Nordic	November 3, 2026	
Lies of P: Complete Edition	Neowiz, Round8 Studio	Neowiz	August 6, 2026	
Lifted	Adventure Works	Adventure Works	TBA	
Listen Up! We Tried to Make "Those Games" Even More Extreme! Some Things Have to be Learned the Hard Way!	Monkey Craft	D3 Publisher	December 3, 2026	
Little Corners	Meteor Pixel	Weekend Games	2026	
Little Nightmares Enhanced Edition Complete Edition	Engine Software	Bandai Namco Entertainment	October 10, 2025	
Little Nightmares II Enhanced Edition	Supermassive Games	Bandai Namco Entertainment	May 29, 2026	
Little Nightmares III	Supermassive Games	Bandai Namco Entertainment	October 10, 2025	
Littlelands	Rafael Martín, Kyle Creamer	Apogee Entertainment	TBA	
Little Rocket Lab – Nintendo Switch 2 Edition	Teenage Astronauts	No More Robots	December 10, 2025	
Lollipop Chainsaw RePOP – Nintendo Switch 2 Edition	Dragami Games	Dragami Games	May 28, 2026	
Look Outside	Francis Coulombe	Devolver Digital	October 30, 2026	
The Lord of the Rings: War in the North – Legacy Edition	Aspyr	Aspyr	August 11, 2026	
Lords of the Fallen II	Hexworks	CI Games	Q1 2027	
Lorelei and the Laser Eyes – Nintendo Switch 2 Edition	Simogo	Annapurna Interactive	April 23, 2026	
Lost and Found Co. – Nintendo Switch 2 Edition	Bit Egg	Bit Egg	Q1/Q2 2027	
Lost Museum: Echoes of the Chromageists	Wit One	Happinet	Q2/Q3 2027	
Lou's Lagoon – Nintendo Switch 2 Edition	Tiny Roar	Megabit, Rokaplay	August 27, 2026	
LoveR Kiss: Endless Memories	Dragami Games	Dragami Games	November 27, 2025	
Lovish	Labs Works	Dangen Entertainment	February 5, 2026	
Lucky Luke: The Lonesome Cowboy Collection	Graphite Lab	Infogrames	January 13, 2027	
Lufia I & II: The Sinistrals Saga	Taito	Taito, Clear River Games	2027	
Lynked: Banner of the Spark – Nintendo Switch 2 Edition	FuzzyBot	Dreamhaven	September 12, 2025	
Madden NFL 26	EA Orlando	EA Sports	August 14, 2025	
Madden NFL 27	EA Orlando	EA Sports	August 13, 2026	
Maestro	Double Jack	Double Jack	September 17, 2026	
Magical Blush	Alkacer Game Studio	Dangen Entertainment	2027	
Majogami	Inti Creates	Inti Creates	October 30, 2025	
Mamon King for Nintendo Switch 2	Litmus	Litmus	October 8, 2026	
Manairons – Nintendo Switch 2 Edition	JanduSoft, 3Cat	JanduSoft	October 29, 2026	
Maneater 2	Tripwire Interactive, Demiurge Studios	Tripwire Interactive	2027	
Mario Kart World	Nintendo EPD	Nintendo	June 5, 2025	
Mario Tennis Fever	Camelot Software Planning	Nintendo	February 12, 2026	
Marupoyo: The Round Chick's Adventure	Casual Brothers	Casual Brothers	November 26, 2026	
Marvel Cosmic Invasion	Tribute Games	Dotemu	December 1, 2025	
Marvel Rivals	NetEase Games	NetEase Games	TBA	
Marvel's Guardians of the Galaxy: Encore Edition	Eidos-Montréal	CDE Entertainment	November 5, 2026	
Maseylia: Echoes of the Past	Sol Brothers	Sol Brothers	2026	
Meccha Chameleon	Lemorion_1224, Haganeiro	Lemorion_1224	September 9, 2026	
MechAnimals	BouncyBrain	BouncyBrain	TBA	
Mechborn	Turtle Juice	Curve Games	Q1 2027	
Mega Man: Dual Override	Capcom	Capcom	Q1/Q2 2027	
MegaGum	N-Zone, FrostyFroggs, Chibbi Phoenix	N-Zone Productions	2027	
Meltmare	//commentout	//commentout	TBA	
Melty Blood: Twi-Lumina	French-Bread	French Bread	April 22, 2027	
Memory of Memorie: A Chill Story – Nintendo Switch 2 Edition	BeXide	BeXide	July 23, 2026	
The Mermaid Mask	SFB Games	SFB Games	July 16, 2026	
Metal Gear Solid: Master Collection Vol. 2	Konami	Konami	August 27, 2026	
Metal Slug Ultimate Collection	SNK	SNK	2027	
Metaphor: ReFantazio	Studio Zero	Sega	November 12, 2026	
Metro Quester Zero	Thousand Games	Kemco	Q2 2027	
Metroid Prime 4: Beyond – Nintendo Switch 2 Edition	Retro Studios	Nintendo	December 4, 2025	
Metroid Ravenous	MercurySteam, Nintendo EPD	Nintendo	January 28, 2027	
Mewgenics	Edmund McMillen, Tyler Glaiel	Nicalis	September 8, 2026	
Middle-earth: Shadow of Mordor Game of the Year Edition	Monolith Productions, Aspyr	Aspyr	September 30, 2026	
Middle-earth: Shadow of War Definitive Edition	Monolith Productions, Aspyr	Aspyr	September 30, 2026	
The Midnight Walk	MoonHood	Fast Travel Games	March 26, 2026	
Mighty Cuphead Adventure	Studio MDHR	Studio MDHR	TBA	
Mina the Hollower – Nintendo Switch 2 Edition	Yacht Club Games	Yacht Club Games	May 29, 2026	
Minecraft	Mojang Studios	Mojang Studios	October 27, 2026	
Minecraft Dungeons II	Mojang Studios, Double Eleven	Xbox Game Studios	September 29, 2026	
Mind Diver	Indoor Sunglasses	Playism	August 27, 2026	
Minishoot' Adventures — Nintendo Switch 2 Edition	SoulGame Studio	Seaven Studio	March 3, 2026	
MIO: Memories in Orbit	Douze Dixièmes	Focus Entertainment	January 20, 2026	
Mixtape	Beethoven & Dinosaur	Annapurna Interactive	May 7, 2026	
Model Debut3 #nicola	Racjin	FuRyu	October 14, 2026	
Model Debut4	Racjin	FuRyu	August 26, 2026	
Momento	Fat Alien Cat, Nomo Studios	Silver Lining	June 30, 2026	
Momotaro Dentetsu 2: Anata no Machi mo Kitto Aru – Nintendo Switch 2 Edition	Konami	Konami	November 13, 2025	
Monochrome Mobius: Rights and Wrongs Forgotten	Aquaplus	NIS America	May 28, 2026	
Monopoly: Star Wars Heroes vs. Villains	Behaviour Interactive	Ubisoft	June 30, 2026	
Monster Girls and the Mysterious Adventure Remastered Edition	Nekotokage Games	Waku Waku Games	July 16, 2026	
Monster Hunter Stories 3: Twisted Reflection	Capcom	Capcom	March 13, 2026	
Monster Hunter Wilds	Capcom	Capcom	December 4, 2026	
Monster Train 2	Shiny Shoe	Big Fan Games	2026	
Montabi	Monkabi	Akupara Games	August 6, 2026	
Moomin: Midsummer Madness	Crossbridge Game Studio	Shochiku	November 12, 2026	
Moomintroll: Winter's Warmth – Nintendo Switch 2 Edition	Hyper Games	Kakehashi Games	September 18, 2026	
Moonlight Peaks – Nintendo Switch 2 Edition	Little Chicken	Marvelous	July 7, 2026	
Moonlighter 2: The Endless Vault	Digital Sun	11 Bit Studios	September 2, 2026	
Moros Protocol	Pixel Reign	Super Rare Originals	October 1, 2026	
Mortal Kombat: Legacy Kollection	Digital Eclipse	Atari	October 30, 2025	
Moss: The Forgotten Relic	Polyarc	Polyarc	July 16, 2026	
MotoGP 26	Milestone	Milestone	April 29, 2026	
Mouse: P.I. for Hire	Fumi Games	PlaySide Studios	April 16, 2026	
Mouse Work	Nitrome	PM Studios	December 7, 2026	
Mr. Magpie's Harmless Card Game	Giant Light Studios	Behaviour Interactive, Gambit Digital	Q1/Q2 2027	
Mr. Records	Glee Cheese Studio	Wired Productions	TBA	
Muramasa: Revenant Blades	Vanillaware	Xseed Games	February 4, 2027	
My Arms Are Longer Now	Toot Games	Jackbox Games	March 11, 2027	
My Friendly Neighborhood	John Szymanski, Evan Szymanski	DreadXP	October 22, 2026	
My Hero Academia: All's Justice	Byking	Bandai Namco Entertainment	September 3, 2026	
My Time at Evershine	Pathea Games	Pathea Games	2027	
N Plus Infinity Times Two	Metanet Software	Metanet Software	2027	
Namco Legendary Mountains	BeXide	BeXide	June 25, 2026	
NBA 2K26	Visual Concepts	2K	September 5, 2025	
NBA 2K27	Visual Concepts	2K	September 4, 2026	
The Necromancer's Tale	Psychic Software	Silver Lining	June 24, 2026	
The New Denpa Men	Genius Sonority	Genius Sonority	April 6, 2026	
Next: The Portopia Serial Murder Case	Room6	G-Mode	March 4, 2027	
Nicktoons & The Dice of Destiny	Fair Play Labs, Petit Fabrik	GameMill Entertainment	December 5, 2025	
Nightmare Busters Rebirth	Pix'n Love	Pix'n Love	December 2026	
Nightmare Circus	FairPlay Studios	Red Dunes Games	TBA	
Ninja Baseball League-Man: Bases Loaded	City Connection, Irem	City Connection	December 10, 2026	
Ninja JaJaMaru: Yokai Night Parade	City Connection, Amazing	City Connection, Clear River Games	2027	
Ninjala 2: The Uncharted World	GungHo Online Entertainment	GungHo Online Entertainment	Q1/Q2 2027	
Nintendo Switch 2 Welcome Tour	Nintendo EPD, Nintendo Cube	Nintendo	June 5, 2025	
Nintendo Switch Sports Resort	Nintendo EPD	Nintendo	October 22, 2026	
No Man's Sky – Nintendo Switch 2 Edition	Hello Games	Hello Games	June 5, 2025	
No Rest for the Wicked	Moon Studios	Moon Studios	TBA	
No Sleep for Kaname Date – From AI: The Somnium Files	Spike Chunsoft	Spike Chunsoft	July 25, 2025	
Nobunaga's Ambition: Awakening Complete Edition	Koei Tecmo	Koei Tecmo	June 5, 2025	
Nobunaga's Ambition: Hishou	Kou Shibusawa	Koei Tecmo	Q4 2026/Q1 2027	
Noroi Ayashi: The ∞th Oddity	SuperNiche	Game Source Entertainment	2027	
Nostalgic Train	Tatamibeya	Amata Games	August 26, 2026	
Novel Rogue – Nintendo Switch 2 Edition	Exe-Create	Kemco	January 29, 2026	
Obakeidoro 2: Chase & Seek	Free Style	Free Style	October 9, 2025	
Observer: System Redux	Bloober Team	Aspyr	June 18, 2026	
Octopath Traveler	Acquire	Square Enix	July 13, 2026	
Octopath Traveler 0	Square Enix, DokiDoki Grooveworks	Square Enix	December 4, 2025	
Octopath Traveler II	Acquire	Square Enix	July 13, 2026	
Old Coin Pusher Gaiden	STP Works	STP Works	August 13, 2026	
Once Upon a Katamari	RENGAME	Bandai Namco Entertainment	October 8, 2026	
Ondeh Ondeh Kaya's Tasty Tale	Bandai Namco Entertainment Asia	Bandai Namco Entertainment	2027	
One Military Camp	Abylight Barcelona	Abylight	May 28, 2026	
One Move Away	Ramage Game	Playstack	May 28, 2026	
One Piece: Grand Gourmet	Kairosoft	Bandai Namco Entertainment	October 23, 2026	
One Piece: Pirate Warriors 4 – Nintendo Switch 2 Edition	Omega Force	Bandai Namco Entertainment	November 21, 2025	
One Turn Kill	Team Denden	Wakuwaku Games	October 28, 2026	
Onimusha: Way of the Sword	Capcom	Capcom	September 4, 2026	
Onyx: The Dark Grip	Bloober Team	Bloober Team	2027	
Opus: Prism Peak	Sigono	Shueisha Games	April 16, 2026	
Orbitals	Shapefarm	Kepler Interactive	September 3, 2026	
Order of the Sinking Star	Thekla	Arc Games	October 8, 2026	
Order Up!!	SuperVillain Studios	Nicalis	2026	
Our Flick Erasers 4 – Nintendo Switch 2 Edition	Sat-Box	Sat-Box	April 30, 2026	
Out of Words	Kong Orange, Wired Fly, Morten Sondergaard	Epic Games Publishing	2027	
Outbound	Silver Lining Interactive	Square Glade Games	May 14, 2026	
The Outlast Trials	Red Barrels	Red Barrels	October 27, 2026	
Outlaws + Handful of Missions: Remaster – Nintendo Switch 2 Edition	Nightdive Studios	Atari	July 16, 2026	
Ova Magica	Skinny Frog	Top Hat Studios	November 10, 2026	
Over the Hill	Strelka Games, Funselektor	Funselektor	2027	
Overcooked! 2 – Nintendo Switch 2 Edition	Team17, Ghost Town Games	Team17	November 6, 2025	
Overrogue – Nintendo Switch 2 Edition	Exe-Create	Kemco	January 15, 2026	
Overwatch	Blizzard Entertainment	Blizzard Entertainment	April 14, 2026	
Pac-Man World 2 Re-Pac	Now Production	Bandai Namco Entertainment	September 26, 2025	
Palia – Nintendo Switch 2 Edition	Singularity 6	Singularity 6	December 2026	
Paper Perjury	Paper Cat Games	Paper Cat Games	2027	
Paper Perjury 2: Shadow of Justice	Paper Cat Games	Paper Cat Games	2028	
Paper Sky	Brute Force	Brute Force	2026	
Parasocial	Chilla's Art	Regista	November 12, 2026	
Parcel Simulator	Dansan Digital	Fellow Traveller Games	December 9, 2026	
Parkasaurus: Dinoluxe Edition	Washbear Studio	Infogrames	August 5, 2026	
Party Party Time 3 Nintendo Switch 2 Edition	Sat-Box	Sat-Box	September 18, 2026	
Pastry Panic!	Megatent	Nicalis	TBA	
Path of Mystery 2: The Mermaid Legend Murder Case	Toybox	Imagineer	September 17, 2026	
Paw Patrol: Dino World	3DClouds	Outright Games	October 2, 2026	
Peak	Aggro Crab, Landfall	Aggro Crab, Landfall	October 22, 2026	
Penguin Colony	Origame Digital	Fellow Traveller Games	2026	
People of Note	Iridium Studios	Annapurna Interactive	April 7, 2026	
Persona 3 Reload	Atlus	Sega	October 23, 2025	
Persona 4 Revival	Atlus	Sega	May 20, 2027	
Persona 6	Atlus	Sega	TBA	
Petal Runner	Nano Park Studios	Iam8bit	March 8, 2027	
Petit Planet	miHoYo	Hoyoverse	2027	
PGA Tour 2K25	HB Studios	2K	February 6, 2026	
Phasmophobia	Kinetic Games	Kinetic Games	2027	
Picross S Climax	Jupiter Corporation	Jupiter Corporation	December 10, 2026	
Pikmin 4 – Nintendo Switch 2 Edition + Dandori Academy	Nintendo EPD, Eighting	Nintendo	November 12, 2026	
Pikuniku 2	Sectordub	Devolver Digital	2027	
Pipistrello and the Cursed Yoyo – Nintendo Switch 2 Edition	Pocket Trap	PM Studios	August 20, 2026	
Pit Panic	Flying Rat Studio	Flying Rat Studio	July 21, 2026	
Pixel Washer	Valadria	Acclaim Entertainment	2027	
Planet of Lana II: Nintendo Switch 2 Edition	Wishfully	Thunderful Games	March 5, 2026	
Plants vs. Zombies: Replanted	PopCap Games, The Lost Pixels	Electronic Arts	October 23, 2025	
Pokémon Legends: Z-A – Nintendo Switch 2 Edition	Game Freak	Nintendo, The Pokémon Company	October 16, 2025	
Pokémon Pokopia	Koei Tecmo, Game Freak	Nintendo, The Pokémon Company	March 5, 2026	
Pokémon Winds and Waves	Game Freak	Nintendo, The Pokémon Company	2027	
Police Simulator: Patrol Officers	Aesir Interactive	Astragon	June 4, 2026	
Pool Room Billiard	ITL	D3 Publisher	January 22, 2026	
Possessor(s)	Heart Machine	Devolver Digital	April 29, 2026	
PowerWash Simulator 2	FuturLab	FuturLab	October 23, 2025	
Pragmata	Capcom	Capcom	April 17, 2026	
Pratfall	Quad Head	Daedalic Entertainment	TBA	
Precognition	Half Mermaid Productions	Kinetic Publishing	Q2 2028	
The Prince of Tennis: Doki Doki Survival eternal passion – Nintendo Switch 2 Edition	Konami	Konami	July 30, 2026	
The Prince of Tennis: Sweet School Festival 0-40 and more – Nintendo Switch 2 Edition	Konami	Konami	July 30, 2026	
Prinny Party: Going Overboard! — Nintendo Switch 2 Edition	Nippon Ichi Software	NIS America	November 11, 2026	
Pritto Prisoner – Nintendo Switch 2 Edition	PinCool	PinCool	December 25, 2025	
Professor Layton and the Curious Village Remake	Level-5	Level-5	2027	
Professor Layton and the New World of Steam	Level-5	Level-5	December 9, 2026	
Psikyo Memories	Edia	Edia	February 18, 2027	
Psyvariar 3 – Nintendo Switch 2 Edition	Red Art Studios	Success, Red Art Games	March 19, 2026	
Punyan for Nintendo Switch 2	G-Mode	G-Mode	November 20, 2025	
Putty World	System 3 Software	System 3 Software	Q2 2027	
Puyo Puyo Tetris 2S	Sega	Sega	June 5, 2025	
Queen's Domain	Freshly Baked Games	Future Friends Games	October 30, 2026	
Quest of Dungeons	Upfall Studios	Flyhigh Works	August 27, 2026	
R-Type Dimensions III	KRITZELKRATZ 3000	ININ Games	May 19, 2026	
R-Type Tactics I – II Cosmos – Nintendo Switch 2 Edition	Granzella	Granzella	March 12, 2026	
R.E.P.O.	Semiwork	Semiwork	2027	
Raccoin: Chaos Max Edition	Doraccoon	Playstack	November 10, 2026	
Radiant Starlets	Buster X Buster	Buster X Buster	TBA	
Ragnarok Console Project	Waycoder	Gravity, Daweon Game Media Lab	Q1/Q2 2027	
Raidou Remastered: The Mystery of the Soulless Army	Atlus	Atlus, Sega	June 19, 2025	
Rain World – Nintendo Switch 2 Edition	Videocult	Akupara Games	February 18, 2027	
The Ramen Sensei – Nintendo Switch 2 Edition	Kairosoft	Kairosoft	September 3, 2026	
Ratatan	Game Source Entertainment	Ratata Arts Co., Ltd.	October 14, 2026	
Ravenswatch – Nintendo Switch 2 Edition	Passtech Games	Nacon	December 10, 2026	
Rayman Legends Retold	Ubisoft Milan, Ubisoft Montpellier	Ubisoft	December 3, 2026	
Rayman Origins: Enhanced Edition	Ubisoft Montpellier	Ubisoft	December 3, 2026	
Reanimal	Tarsier Studios	THQ Nordic	February 13, 2026	
Reel Fishing: Days of Summer – Nintendo Switch 2 Edition	Tachyon Inc.	Natsume Inc.	October 22, 2026	
Red Dead Redemption – Nintendo Switch 2 Edition	Rockstar San Diego, Double Eleven, Cast Iron Games	Rockstar Games	December 2, 2025	
Red Rooster	Summer Eternal	Summer Eternal	TBA	
Relayer Advanced Definitive Edition	Dragami Games	Dragami Games	September 25, 2025	
The Relic: First Guardian	Project Cloud Games	Perp Games	October 9, 2026	
Remothered: Broken Porcelain Remastered	Stormind Games	Stormind Games	Q1 2027	
Remothered: Red Nun's Legacy	Stormind Games	Stormind Games	December 3, 2026	
Remothered: Tormented Fathers Remastered	Stormind Games	Stormind Games	Q1 2027	
Resident Evil 2 Deluxe Edition	Capcom	Capcom	October 16, 2026	
Resident Evil 3	Capcom	Capcom	October 16, 2026	
Resident Evil 4 Gold Edition	Capcom	Capcom	October 16, 2026	
Resident Evil 7: Biohazard Gold Edition	Capcom	Capcom	February 27, 2026	
Resident Evil Requiem	Capcom	Capcom	February 27, 2026	
Resident Evil Veronica	Capcom	Capcom	2027	
Resident Evil Village Gold Edition	Capcom	Capcom	February 27, 2026	
RetroSpace	The Wild Gentlemen	Kwalee	TBA	
Reverie in the Moonlight – Nintendo Switch 2 Edition	Room6	Room6	November 19, 2026	
Rhythm Doctor – Nintendo Switch 2 Edition	7th Beat Games	7th Beat Games	December 2026	
Riders Republic	Ubisoft Annecy	Ubisoft	December 9, 2026	
Riichi Mahjong	D3 Publisher	D3 Publisher	December 25, 2025	
Ripple Island: Kyle & Cal's Restaurant	Sunsoft	Sunsoft	November 27, 2025	
Rise of the Tomb Raider: 20 Year Celebration	Crystal Dynamics	Aspyr	June 9, 2026	
The Road of Dust and Sorrow	Painted Black Games	Silver Lining Interactive	February 19, 2027	
Rogue Fortune	Glowmade	Glowmade	2027	
The Rogue Prince of Persia	Evil Empire	Ubisoft	December 16, 2025	
Rogue Reigns	Venn Studios	Venn Studios	Q1 2027	
RollerCoaster Tycoon Classic – Nintendo Switch 2 Edition	Graphite Lab	Atari	May 28, 2026	
Rollin' Rascal	Gabriel Gonzalez, Curiomatic	Gabriel Gonzalez, Curiomatic	2026	
Romancing SaGa 2: Revenge of the Seven – Nintendo Switch 2 Edition	Xeen	Square Enix	July 31, 2025	
Romancing SaGa 3: Destinies United	Square Enix	Square Enix	February 4, 2027	
Rooftops & Alleys: The Parkour Game – Nintendo Switch 2 Edition	ML Media	Shine Research	November 10, 2026	
Rotwood	Klei Entertainment	Klei Entertainment	March 3, 2026	
Rover's Tale	Observer Interactive	Team17	2026	
Royal Revolt Survivors	Team Warriors	Headup Games	March 16, 2026	
Rudolph the Red-Nosed Reindeer - Holiday Play Edition	Headless Chicken Games	GameMill Entertainment	October 16, 2026	
Rugby League 26	Big Ant Studios	Nacon	June 5, 2026	
The Rumble Fish 2 – Nintendo Switch 2 Edition	Dimps	3goo	January 22, 2026	
Run for Money: Hunters vs. Runners! Can You Win as Either?	D3 Publisher	D3 Publisher	December 4, 2025	
Rune Factory: Guardians of Azuma – Nintendo Switch 2 Edition	Marvelous	Marvelous	June 5, 2025	
RuneScape: Dragonwilds	Jagex	Jagex	September 15, 2026	
Rushing Beat X: Return of Brawl Brothers	City Connection	Clear River Games	March 19, 2026	
RV There Yet?	Nuggets Entertainment	Nuggets Entertainment	October 29, 2026	
Sai-Kyo-Oh! Clash Battle Kings	Nippon Columbia	Nippon Columbia	November 26, 2026	
Sail Forth – Nintendo Switch 2 Edition	Festive Vector	The Quantum Astrophysicists Guild	January 16, 2026	
Sayonara Wild Hearts – Nintendo Switch 2 Edition	Simogo	Annapurna Interactive	April 23, 2026	
Schrödinger's Call	Acrobatic Chirimenjako	Shueisha Games	October 28, 2026	
Scott Pilgrim EX	Tribute Games	Tribute Games	March 3, 2026	
Screenbound	Crescent Moon Games, Radical Forge	Crescent Moon Games, Digital Pajamas	TBA	
Scritchy Scratchy	Lunch Money Games	Funday Games	September 28, 2026	
Sea of Stars	Sabotage Studio	Sabotage Studio	June 8, 2026	
The Séance of Blake Manor	Spooky Doorway	Raw Fury	October 27, 2026	
Seeker Eye	Mages	Mages	February 25, 2027	
Seina: A Tale of Spirits	Argyro Brotsi	Pofupofu Studios	2026	
Sektori	Kimmo Lahtinen	Kimmo Factor	May 14, 2026	
Shadow Labyrinth – Nintendo Switch 2 Edition	Bandai Namco Studios	Bandai Namco Entertainment	July 18, 2025	
Shadow of the Tomb Raider: Definitive Edition	Eidos-Montréal	Aspyr	October 22, 2026	
Shadow Tactics: Blades of the Shogun	Mimimi Games	Daedalic Entertainment	March 18, 2026	
Shadow Tactics: Blades of the Shogun - Aiko's Choice	Mimimi Games	Daedalic Entertainment	March 18, 2026	
Shape of Dreams	Lizard Smoothie	Neowiz	September 17, 2026	
ShapeHero Factory	Asobism	Asobism	September 18, 2025	
Shellbound	Fake Lobster Games	Kinetic Publishing	Q2/Q3 2028	
Shelterra the Skyworld – Nintendo Switch 2 Edition	Kemco	Kemco	November 5, 2026	
Shenmue III Enhanced	Ys Net	Inin Games	Q1/Q2 2027	
Shikhondo: Blue Pieta	CFK	DeerFarm	December 10, 2026	
Shin-chan: Me and the Professor on Summer Vacation – The Endless Seven-Day Journey	Millennium Kitchen, Star Factory	Neos	March 4, 2027	
Shin-chan: Shiro and the Coal Town	h.a.n.d.	Neos	March 4, 2027	
Shine Post: Be Your Idol!	Konami	Konami	June 5, 2025	
Shinobi: Art of Venegance	Lizardcube	Sega	September 24, 2026	
Shironeko Project Infinity	Colopl	Colopl	2027	
Shrek 2 Remastered	Aspyr	Aspyr	November 10, 2026	
Shuten Order – Nintendo Switch 2 Edition	Too Kyo Games, Neilo	DMM Games	November 27, 2025	
Sid Meier's Civilization VII – Nintendo Switch 2 Edition	Firaxis Games	2K	June 5, 2025	
Signal Veil	Time Hunters	Serafini Productions	TBA	
Silly Polly Beast	Anji Games	Top Hat Studios	November 2026	
Silver Pines	Wych Elm Games	Team17	October 8, 2026	
Simogo Legacy Collection – Nintendo Switch 2 Edition	Simogo	Simogo	December 2, 2025	
SiN Reloaded – Nintendo Switch 2 Edition	Nightdive Studios	Atari	September 24, 2026	
The Sinking City 2	Frogwares	Frogwares	2027	
Skate Story	Sam Eng	Devolver Digital	December 8, 2025	
Skatesterre	Goon Squad	Headup Games	August 13, 2026	
The Sky Project: Land of Norris	Enthariel Games	Enthariel Games	TBA	
Sky the Scraper	Ryo Kobuchi	Hyper Real, Toydium, Chorus Worldwide	TBA	
Skyship Quest Story – Nintendo Switch 2 Edition	Kairosoft	Kairosoft	April 30, 2026	
Slime Rancher 2	Monomi Park	Monomi Park	January 2027	
The Slormancer Nintendo Switch 2 Edition	Slormite Studios	Plug In Digital	November 9, 2026	
Smalland: Survive the Wilds	Merge Games	Maximum Entertainment	May 14, 2026	
Smalland 2: Lost Realms	Maximum Entertainment	Maximum Entertainment	2027	
Snack World: Reloaded	Level-5	Level-5	2027	
Sniper Dan	Denki	PQube	September 17, 2026	
Snoopy & The Great Mystery Club	Cradle Games	GameMill Entertainment	March 17, 2026	
SNØ: Ultimate Freeriding	Studio Gauntlet	Amata	October 28, 2026	
SnowRunner	Saber Interactive	Focus Home Interactive	June 9, 2026	
Solarpunk	Cyberware	Rokaplay	June 8, 2026	
Soma – Nintendo Switch 2 Edition	Frictional Games	Abylight Studios	July 23, 2026	
Sombras: Negative Frames	Maboroshi Artworks	Entalto Publishing	December 3, 2026	
Sonic Frontiers Definitive Edition	Sonic Team	Sega	June 23, 2026	
Sonic Pico Park	Tecopark	Tecopark	November 12, 2026	
Sonic Racing: CrossWorlds – Nintendo Switch 2 Edition	Sonic Team	Sega	December 4, 2025	
Sonic X Shadow Generations	Sonic Team	Sega	June 5, 2025	
South of Midnight Weaver's Edition	Compulsion Games	Xbox Game Studios	March 31, 2026	
Sp(L/R)ite	Tricore, Inc.	Waku Waku Games	September 24, 2026	
Space Warlord Baby Trading Simulator	Strange Scaffold	Strange Scaffold, Frosty Pop	July 9, 2026	
The Spectrum Retreat: Redux	Dan Smith Studios	Ripstone Studios	October 29, 2026	
Spine	Nekki	Nekki	TBA	
Spirit Crossing	Spry Fox	Netflix	November 16, 2026	
Spirit Valor – Nintendo Switch 2 Edition	Exe-Create	Kemco	September 17, 2026	
Splatoon Raiders	Nintendo EPD	Nintendo	July 23, 2026	
Split Fiction	Hazelight Studios	Electronic Arts	June 5, 2025	
SpongeBob SquarePants: Titans of the Tide	Purple Lamp	THQ Nordic	November 18, 2025	
Spooky Spirit Shooting Gallery for Nintendo Switch 2	Nippon Columbia	Nippon Columbia, Aksys Games	August 6, 2026	
Sports Camp: A 35-Game Adventure	Fishing Cactus	Plug In Digital	August 20, 2026	
Sprawl Zero	Maeth	Kwalee	September 8, 2026	
Spyder: Agent 8	Sumo Digital	PQube	February 11, 2027	
Spyro: A Realm Beyond	Toys for Bob	Activision	2027	
Squirrel with a Gun	Dee Dee Creations	Maximum Entertainment	November 18, 2025	
Stage Fright	Ghost Town Games	Hello Games	2027	
Stage Tour	RedOctane Games	RedOctane Games	December 10, 2026	
Star Fox	Velan Studios	Nintendo	June 25, 2026	
Star Ocean: The Second Story R	Gemdrops	Square Enix	July 15, 2026	
Star Trek: Shadow Frontier	Bloober Team	Paramount Games Studio	2027	
Star Trek: Voyager – Across the Unknown	Gamexcite	Daedalic Entertainment	February 18, 2026	
Star Wars Outlaws Gold Edition	Massive Entertainment	Ubisoft	September 4, 2025	
Starbites – Nintendo Switch 2 Edition	Ikinagames	NIS America	July 14, 2026	
Stardew Valley – Nintendo Switch 2 Edition	ConcernedApe	ConcernedApe	December 25, 2025	
Stardust: Wish of Witch	Kniv Studio	Silver Lining Entertainment	Q1 2027	
Starsand Island	Seed Sparkle Lab	Seed Sparkle Lab	August 18, 2026	
Starseeker: Astroneer Expeditions	System Era Softworks	Devolver Digital	June 11, 2026	
Starship Troopers: Ultimate Bug War!	Auroch Digital	Dotemu	March 16, 2026	
Station Manager – Nintendo Switch 2 Edition	Kairosoft	Kairosoft	November 12, 2026	
Station to Station	Galaxy Grove	Engine Software	November 26, 2026	
Steins;Gate: Octet of Shifting Space	Mages	Mages	August 20, 2026	
Steins;Gate Re:Boot	Mages	Mages, Spike Chunsoft	August 20, 2026	
Stellar Code	Fragaria	Kemco	October 16, 2026	
Stellar Blade Complete Edition	Shift Up	Shift Up	November 5, 2026	
Step Theater	Pixel Smile	NB Games	December 2, 2026	
Storm Lancers – Nintendo Switch 2 Edition	ProbablyMonsters	ProbablyMonsters	December 9, 2025	
Story of Seasons: Grand Bazaar – Nintendo Switch 2 Edition	Marvelous	Marvelous	August 27, 2025	
Stray	BlueTwelve Studio	Annapurna Interactive	May 28, 2026	
Street Fighter 6	Capcom	Capcom	June 5, 2025	
Subnautica – Nintendo Switch 2 Edition	Unknown Worlds Entertainment	Unknown Worlds Entertainment	February 17, 2026	
Subnautica: Below Zero – Nintendo Switch 2 Edition	Unknown Worlds Entertainment	Unknown Worlds Entertainment	February 17, 2026	
Sugardew Island – Nintendo Switch 2 Edition	Rokaplay	Rokaplay	December 10, 2026	
Suika Game Planet	Aladdin X	Aladdin X	January 5, 2026	
Suikoden I & II HD Remaster: Gate Rune and Dunan Unification Wars	Konami	Konami	June 5, 2025	
Sulfur	Perfect Random	Perfect Random	October 28, 2026	
Sumikkogurashi Welcome to Pokapoka Onsen	Nippon Columbia	Nippon Columbia	November 19, 2026	
Super Battle Golf	Brimstone Games	Oro Interactive	March 25, 2027	
Super Bomberman Collection – Nintendo Switch 2 Edition	Red Art Games	Konami	February 5, 2026	
Super Mario Bros. Wonder – Nintendo Switch 2 Edition + Meetup in Bellabel Park	Nintendo EPD	Nintendo	March 26, 2026	
Super Mario Party Jamboree – Nintendo Switch 2 Edition + Jamboree TV	Nintendo Cube	Nintendo	July 24, 2025	
Super Meat Boy 3D	Sluggerfly	Headup Games	March 31, 2026	
Supermarket Simulator	Nokta Games	Silver Lining Interactive	November 12, 2026	
Survival Kids	Unity Technologies	Konami	June 5, 2025	
Sushi Bar Moebius for Nintendo Switch 2	Winglay	G-Mode	February 26, 2026	
Sword of the Sea	Giant Squid	Fictions	October 29, 2026	
System Shock	Nightdive Studios	Atari	December 18, 2025	
System Shock 2: 25th Anniversary Remaster – Nintendo Switch 2 Edition	Nightdive Studios	Atari	June 3, 2026	
Table Game World CCFolia	CCFolia	CCFolia	November 10, 2026	
Talaka	Potato Kid	Acclaim Entertainment	January 21, 2027	
Tales from Toyotoki: Arrival of the Witch	Fragaria	Kemco	August 6, 2026	
Tales of Arise – Beyond the Dawn Edition	Bandai Namco Studios	Bandai Namco Entertainment	May 22, 2026	
Tales of Eternia Remastered	Tose	Bandai Namco Entertainment	October 16, 2026	
Tales of the Shire: A The Lord of the Rings Game Nintendo Switch 2 Edition	Wētā Workshop	Fictions	March 25, 2026	
Tamagotchi Plaza Nintendo Switch 2 Edition	Hyde	Bandai Namco Entertainment	June 26, 2025	
Tamer Town	Crazy Goat Games	Crazy Goat Games	2026	
Tanuki: Pon's Summer	Denkiworks	Critical Reflex	November 10, 2026	
TCG Card Shop Simulator	OPNeon Games	OPNeon Games	September 15, 2026	
Teenage Mutant Ninja Turtles: Splintered Fate – Nintendo Switch 2 Edition	Super Evil Megacorp	Super Evil Megacorp	December 16, 2025	
Teenage Mutant Ninja Turtles Arcade: Wrath of the Mutants – Ninja Edition	Raw Thrills, Cradle Games	Trailmark Games	September 4, 2026	
Teeto	Eat Pant Games	Super Rare Games	July 15, 2026	
Tenebris Somnia	Andrés Borghi, Saibot Studios	New Blood Interactive	TBA	
Tenjutsu	Deepnight Games	Devolver Digital	2027	
Terranigma – Nintendo Switch 2 Edition	Clear River Games	Clear River Games	January 14, 2027	
Thermocline	Decent Treatment	Semicolon	TBA	
They Are Billions	Numantian Games	Suncrest Games	January 22, 2026	
Thief: The Dark Project Remastered – Nintendo Switch 2 Edition	Nightdive Studios, Eidos Montreal	Atari	December 3, 2026	
Threads of Time	Riyo Games	Balor Games	Q2/Q3 2027	
Tianji: Shadow of the Ancients	Justdan International	Justdan International	2027	
Titanium Court	AP Thomson	Fellow Traveller Games	October 29, 2026	
To a T	Uvula	Annapurna Interactive	June 11, 2026	
Toem 2	Something We Made	Something We Made	September 29, 2026	
Tokyo Scramble	Adglobe	Binary Haze Interactive	February 11, 2026	
Tomb Raider I–III Remastered	Aspyr	Aspyr	March 12, 2026	
Tomb Raider: Definitive Edition	Crystal Dynamics	Aspyr	November 18, 2025	
Tomb Raider: Legacy of Atlantis	Crystal Dynamics	Amazon Game Studios	February 12, 2027	
Tomba! Special Edition	Whoopee Camp; Limited Run Games	Limited Run Games	January 5, 2026	
Tomba! 2: The Evil Swine Return Special Edition	Whoopee Camp; Limited Run Games	Limited Run Games	December 15, 2025	
Tomo: Endless Blue	Onibi	Onibi	TBA	
Tony Hawk's Pro Skater 3 + 4	Iron Galaxy	Activision	July 11, 2025	
Tormented Souls 2	Dual Effect	PQube	October 15, 2026	
Toshinden Collection	Edia	Edia	2027	
Total Chaos	Trigger Happy Interactive	Atari, Infogrames	April 29, 2026	
Touhou Koumakyou: New Classic - the Embodiment of Scarlet Devil	Shanghai Alice Reprise	Alliance Arts	September 9, 2026	
Touhou Yukkuri Mountain – Nintendo Switch 2 Edition	BeXide	BeXide	May 28, 2026	
The Touryst: Deluxe	Shin'en Multimedia	Shin'en Multimedia	September 25, 2025	
Toy Story 3: Complete Edition	Digital Eclipse	Atari	October 15, 2026	
Toy Story: Retro Roundup!	Digital Eclipse	Atari	October 15, 2026	
Trails in the Sky 1st Chapter – Nintendo Switch 2 Edition	Nihon Falcom	GungHo	September 19, 2025	
Trails in the Sky 2nd Chapter – Nintendo Switch 2 Edition	Nihon Falcom	GungHo	September 17, 2026	
Trine 6: Together in Time	Frozenbyte	Cooldown Games	March 4, 2027	
Trinity Trigger DX	Three Rings	FuRyu	September 14, 2026	
Trivia Murder Party 3	Jackbox Games	Jackbox Games	2027	
Tropico 7 – Special Edition	Gaming Mind Studios	Kalypso Media	January 28, 2027	
Truck-kun is Supporting Me from Another World?!	Strange Scaffold	Frosty Pop Games	September 14, 2026	
Truxton Extreme	Tatsujin	Clear River Games	July 30, 2026	
Turok: Origins	Saber Interactive	Saber Interactive	Q2 2027	
Two Point Hospital: Full Health Collection	Two Point Studios	Sega	September 16, 2026	
Two Point Museum	Two Point Studios	Sega	October 28, 2025	
Twofold – Nintendo Switch 2 Edition	Studio Élan	Refint/games	September 17, 2026	
Ugly Within	Yamaitachi	Serafini Productions	TBA	
Ultimate Sheep Raccoon	Clever Endeavour Games	Clever Endeavour Games	December 9, 2025	
Un:Me	Historia	Shueisha	2027	
Unbeatable - Breakout Edition	D-Cell Games	Playstack	2026	
Uncanyon	Graceful Decay	Annapurna Interactive	2027	
Under Par Golf Architect	Broken Arms Games	Broken Arms Games	April 16, 2026	
Underward: Lastboss, Genius Gyaru Doctor	Intense	Intense	December 18, 2025	
Unrailed 2: Back on Track – Nintendo Switch 2 Edition	Indoor Astronaut	Indoor Astronaut	June 11, 2026	
Untarctica	Dog Temaki	Actsan Games	TBA	
Urban Myth Dissolution Center – Nintendo Switch 2 Edition	Hakababunko	Shueisha Games	October 28, 2026	
Utawarerumono: Past and Present Rediscovered	Aquaplus	Aquaplus	May 28, 2026	
Vaewolf	Milky Tea	Megabit	2027	
Valheim	Iron Gate Studio	Coffee Stain Publishing	September 9, 2026	
Valkyrie Saga	Public Void	Rawrlab Games	July 30, 2026	
Vampire Crawlers: The Turbo Wildcard from Vampire Survivors	poncle, Nosebleed Interactive	poncle	April 23, 2026	
Village in the Shade	Nippon Ichi Software	NIS America	July 30, 2026	
Villion: Code	Compile Heart	Compile Heart	June 25, 2026	
Viractal: Will You Trust Your Party? – Nintendo Switch 2 Edition	Sting	Sting	October 1, 2026	
Virtua Fighter 5 R.E.V.O. World Stage	Ryu Ga Gotoku Studio, Sega AM2	Sega	March 26, 2026	
Voidling Bound	Hatchery Games	Hatchery Games	TBA	
The Walking Dead: Streets of Survival	Odaclick Game Studios	Trailmark Games	September 18, 2026	
Waltz and Jam	Flyway Games	Flyway Games	December 3, 2026	
Wandering Sword – Nintendo Switch 2 Edition	The Swordman	Spiral Up Games	January 21, 2027	
Wanderstop	Ivy Road	Annapurna Interactive	June 23, 2026	
Warframe	Digital Extremes	Digital Extremes	March 25, 2026	
Warhammer 40,000: Boltgun	Auroch Digital	Focus Entertainment	October 14, 2026	
Warhammer 40,000: Boltgun 2	Auroch Digital	Big Fan Games	November 19, 2026	
Warhammer 40,000: Dark Heresy	Owlcat Games	Owlcat Games	TBA	
Warhammer 40,000: Rogue Trader	Owlcat Games	Owlcat Games	December 11, 2025	
Warhammer 40,000: Space Marine 2	Saber St. Petersburg	Focus Entertainment	Q4 2026	
Warhammer Age of Sigmar: Deathmaster	Old Skull Games	Dotemu	2027	
Warhammer Survivors	Auroch Digital	Auroch Digital	November 10, 2026	
Warota: I Live Next to The Demon King’s Castle LOL	Team Earth Wars	One or Eight	2027	
Warrior Cats: Clans of the Forest	Bamtang Games	Trailmark Games	October 23, 2026	
We Are So Cooked	Dwarven Brothers	1312 Interactive	TBA	
Weiß Schwarz Online	FuRyu, Lancarse	Bushiroad	March 24, 2027	
Werewolf: The Apocalypse - Rageborn	Crea-ture Studios	Nacon	2027	
What Have You Done, Father?	Making Port, Darkania Works	Making Port	September 10, 2026	
Where the Seeds Fall	CygamesEdge	Cygames	November 5, 2026	
White Creek	Story Bird Studios	PixelHeart	TBA	
Wild Hearts S	Omega Force	Koei Tecmo	July 25, 2025	
Winds of Viridia	Shark Jump	Shark Jump	Q1/Q2 2027	
Winning Post 10 2026	Koei Tecmo	Koei Tecmo	March 26, 2026	
The Witch's Bakery	Sunny Lab	Silver Lining Interactive	October 14, 2026	
Witchbrook	Chucklefish, Robotlity	Chucklefish	January 28, 2027	
The Witcher 3: Wild Hunt – Remastered	CD Projekt RED, Yigsoft	CD Projekt	September 29, 2026	
Wo Long: Fallen Dynasty Complete Edition	Team Ninja	Koei Tecmo	September 3, 2026	
Wo Long 2: Wings of Ember	Team Ninja	Koei Tecmo	March 4, 2027	
Wobbly Life – Nintendo Switch 2 Edition	RubberBandGames	Curve Games	August 20, 2026	
The Wolf Among Us Remastered	Telltale Games	Telltale Games	TBA	
The Wolf Among Us 2	Telltale Games	Telltale Games	2027	
Woodo – Nintendo Switch 2 Edition	Tiny Monks Tales	Daedalic Entertainment	September 16, 2026	
World Table Games & Games Collection 60+	Othello, MegaHouse	D3 Publisher	December 10, 2026	
Worms: Galactic Tactics	Absolutely Games	Team17	2027	
WWE 2K25	Visual Concepts, Shiver Entertainment	2K	July 23, 2025	
WWE 2K26	Visual Concepts, Shiver Entertainment	2K	March 13, 2026	
Xenoblade Chronicles: Definitive Edition – Nintendo Switch 2 Edition	Monolith Soft	Nintendo	June 9, 2026	
Xenoblade Chronicles 2 – Nintendo Switch 2 Edition	Monolith Soft	Nintendo	July 30, 2026	
Xenoblade Chronicles 3 – Nintendo Switch 2 Edition	Monolith Soft	Nintendo	December 3, 2026	
Xenoblade Chronicles X: Definitive Edition – Nintendo Switch 2 Edition	Monolith Soft	Nintendo	February 19, 2026	
Xenoblade Genesis	Monolith Soft	Nintendo	2027	
Xenotilt: Hostile Pinball Action	Wiznwar, Flarb	Flarb	July 16, 2026	
Yakuza 0 Director's Cut	Ryu Ga Gotoku Studio	Sega	June 5, 2025	
Yakuza Kiwami	Ryu Ga Gotoku Studio	Sega	November 13, 2025	
Yakuza Kiwami 2	Ryu Ga Gotoku Studio	Sega	November 13, 2025	
Yakuza Kiwami 3 & Dark Ties	Ryu Ga Gotoku Studio	Sega	February 12, 2026	
Yeah! You Want "Those Games", Right? So Here You Go! Now, Let's See You Clear Them!	Monkey Craft	D3 Publisher	December 3, 2026	
Yeah! You Want "Those Games", Right? So Here You Go! Now, Let's See You Clear Them! 2	Monkey Craft	D3 Publisher	December 3, 2026	
Yobarai Detective: Miasma Breaker – Nintendo Switch 2 Edition	Mebius	Mebius	October 30, 2025	
Yo-kai Watch 2: Haunted Domain	Level-5	Level-5	TBA	
Yooka-Replaylee	Playtonic Games	Playtonic Friends, PM Studios	October 9, 2025	
Yoshi and the Mysterious Book	Good-Feel	Nintendo	May 21, 2026	
Ys VIII: Lacrimosa of Dana	Nihon Falcom	NIS America	February 25, 2027	
Ys X: Proud Nordics	Nihon Falcom	Nihon Falcom, NIS America	July 31, 2025	
Yu-Gi-Oh! Tag Force GX	Matrix Software	Konami	February 16, 2027	
Zero Parades: Director's Cut	ZA/UM	ZA/UM	November 3, 2026	

== See also ==
- List of best-selling Nintendo Switch 2 games
