= Hidden Folks =

2017 hidden object video game

- Developer: Adriaan de Jongh
- Producers: Adriaan de Jongh; Mirthe Venbrux
- Designers: Adriaan de Jongh; Céline Veltman
- Programmers: Adriaan de Jongh; Aran Koning
- Artist: Sylvain Tegroeg
- Writer: Bram van Dijk
- Composer: Martin Kvale
- Engine: Unity
- Platforms: iOS, Linux, macOS, tvOS, Windows, Android, Nintendo Switch
- Release: iOS, Linux, macOS, tvOS, Windows; 15 February 2017; Android; 14 December 2017; Nintendo Switch; 31 October 2018
- Genre: Hidden object game
- Mode: Single-player

Hidden Folks is a hidden object game developed by Adriaan de Jongh and Sylvain Tegroeg. In the game, players are presented with a series of animated, interactive scenes and must find hidden characters, objects, and animals. The game was released for iOS, Android, Linux, macOS, and Windows in February 2017.

== Gameplay ==
Hidden Folks is a wimmelbilderbuch video game in which players are tasked with locating hidden characters, objects, and animals in a series of environments, similar to the British book series Where's Wally?. Each scene is animated and composed of monochrome art. The majority of objects in the environment can be interacted with by tapping or clicking on them.

== Development and release ==
Hidden Folks was developed by Dutch indie video game designer Adriaan de Jongh and Dutch artist Sylvain Tegroeg. A prototype of the game was created by de Jongh after he saw detailed illustrations at Tegroeg's graduate art show. The two began collaborating in 2014, when Tegroeg noticed and was impressed by how de Jongh had used his art. The idea of creating a hidden object game came naturally from Tegroeg's detailed art. All of the game's art was hand-drawn on paper, scanned in to create digital images on a computer, and then layered manually to form the scenes. The game was built using the Unity game engine, but de Jongh also built custom tools to specifically handle the process of digitising the hand-drawn art and maintaining detail on mobile devices. Hidden Folks was designed to be a casual and relaxing gaming experience. The game's audio is composed of noises made from the developers' mouths.

The game was announced in February 2016 and was released for iOS, Android, Linux, macOS, and Windows one year later on February 15.

== Reception ==
Reception

Aggregate score
Aggregator	Score
Metacritic	iOS: 83/100; PC: 78/100

Review score
Publication	Score
TouchArcade	iOS: 5/5

Polygon ranked the game 41st on their list of the 50 best games of 2017, while The Verge named it one of their 15 Best Games of 2017. It was also nominated for "Best Mobile Game" in IGN's Best of 2017 Awards.

=== Accolades ===
Year	Awards	Category	Result	Ref.
2017	Golden Joystick Awards	Handheld/Mobile Game of the Year	Nominated	
2017	The Game Awards 2017	Best Mobile Game	Nominated	
2018	National Academy of Video Game Trade Reviewers Awards	Use of Sound, New IP	Nominated	
2018	Game Developers Choice Awards	Best Mobile Game	Nominated	

== See also ==
- Lost and Found Co., another illustrated hidden-object game with animated scenes
