= Elusive (video game) =

Upcoming video game

- Developer: Chibig
- Publisher: Chibig
- Platforms: Nintendo Switch; Nintendo Switch 2; PlayStation 5; Windows; Xbox Series X/S
- Genre: Action-adventure
- Mode: Single-player

Elusive is an upcoming action-adventure game developed and published by Chibig for the Nintendo Switch, Nintendo Switch 2, PlayStation 5, Windows and Xbox Series X/S.

Inspired by It Takes Two, it is an adventure and exploration game with survival mechanics and a cozy atmosphere. Based on Ghibli's Arrietty, and on Mary Norton's Borrowers, the game stars Zoe, a borrower who explores the human world in search for her father.

Funded by a Kickstarter campaign, the game reached its objective in two hours, and multiplied that amount by six after a month of campaigning.
