= Bel's Fanfare =

- Developer: Chibig
- Publisher: Chibig
- Platforms: Nintendo Switch; Nintendo Switch 2; PlayStation 5; Windows
- Genre: Action-adventure
- Mode: Single-player

Bel's Fanfare is an upcoming action-adventure/RPG game developed and published by Chibig for the Nintendo Switch, Nintendo Switch 2, PlayStation 5 and Windows. Heavily inspired by the first 3D Zelda games, its graphic style is reminiscent of both the Nintendo 64 and GameCube generations.

== Gameplay ==
Bel's Fanfare is an action role-playing game set in a three-dimensional (3D) environment, inspired by games such as The Legend of Zelda: Majora's Mask and Undertale. Players control the on-screen character, Bel, from a third-person perspective to explore dungeons, solve puzzles, and fight monsters. Players may direct the character to perform basic actions such as walking, running, and jumping, and must use items to navigate the environment.

== Plot ==
The main character, Bel, is a demon-like creature who must purify the miasma that has taken over a ship by using her special gong shield. She must do it in order to free her father Belceboo and her siblings from the deepest part of the ship.

== Development ==
Funded in a Kickstarter campaign, the studio did double the minimum amount requested in less than 24 hours.
