= Mika and the Witch's Mountain =

- Developer: Chibig
- Publisher: Chibig
- Platforms: Nintendo Switch, PlayStation 5, Xbox Series and Steam
- Genre: Action-adventure
- Mode: Single-player

Mika and the Witch's Mountain is a 2023 action-adventure game developed and published by Chibig for the Nintendo Switch, PlayStation 5, Xbox Series and Steam.

== Gameplay ==
Mika and The Witch’s Mountain is an open-island, delivery-adventure game. Mika will explore the island, mostly on the back of the flying broom, while delivering parcels for the local people, obtaining new brooms with newer gameplay characteristics.

== Plot ==
Inspired in Kiki’s Delivery Service, it stars pre-teen witch Mika. She is sent to study in Miss Olagari’s witch school, but she gets literally kicked off the mountain-top the school is located on. To get back up, she must fly her way back to the top of Mount Gaun (Montgó) on her own.

== Development ==
The game was developed in Unity, the game engine. Funded in a Kickstarter campaign, it became the best selling ever Spanish videogame in the platform after getting more than 1 million USD on funding.

== Reception ==
Reception

Aggregate scores
Aggregator	Score
Metacritic	(NS) 66/100
OpenCritic	39% recommend

Review scores
Publication	Score
Nintendo Life	5/10
Shacknews	7/10
TouchArcade	3.5/5

The Nintendo Switch version of Mika and the Witch's Mountain received "mixed or average" reviews from critic, according to the review aggregation website Metacritic. Fellow review aggregator OpenCritic assessed that the game received weak approval, being recommended by 39% of critics.
