= Maseylia: Echoes of the Past =

- Developer: Sol Brothers
- Publisher: Sol Brothers
- Composer: Zach Fitzgerald
- Platforms: Windows; Nintendo Switch 2; PlayStation 5; Xbox Series X/S
- Release: 19 June 2026: Windows, Linux; WW: 19 June 2026; Nintendo Switch 2, PlayStation 5, Xbox Series X/S; WW: 2026
- Genre: Metroidvania

Maseylia: Echoes of the Past is a 3D action-adventure platformer/metroidvania developed and published by Sol Brothers. In the game, the player must travel through open-ended levels using platforming abilities. It is planned to be released on 19 June 2026 for Windows and Linux, and later for Nintendo Switch 2, PlayStation 5, and Xbox Series X/S.

== Gameplay ==
Maseylia: Echoes of the Past is an action-adventure platformer where the player can freely explore the levels with dynamic platforming abilities. The developer describes the game as Metroidvania that blends 2D exploration with modern 3D mechanics.

== Development and release ==
Maseylia is developed by French developer Sol Brothers, a team composed of two people. The game is developed for Microsoft Windows, Linux, Nintendo Switch 2, PlayStation 5, and Xbox Series X/S platforms. It was released on 19 June 2026 for Windows and Linux.
