= A Game About Digging a Hole =

2025 video game

- Steam storefront header
- Developer: Cyberwave
- Publishers: rokaplay Bou·tique, Drillhounds
- Engine: Unreal Engine 5
- Platform: Windows Xbox Series S/X iOS Android Nintendo Switch
- Release: February 7, 2025
- Genre: Simulation video game
- Mode: Single-player

A Game About Digging a Hole (AGADAH) is a 2025 simulation video game developed by Cyberwave and published by rokaplay Boutique and Drillhounds. In the game, the player is tasked with digging as big of a hole as they can. As the player digs, they can find ores to sell to a barn that allows them to purchase new or upgraded equipment. The game was designed in about 14 days and released on Steam on February 7, 2025. It received positive responses from critics and players, and sold 250,000 copies within a week of its release.

A follow-up, A Game About Digging a Hole Together, is set to release for Microsoft Windows, Nintendo Switch 2, PlayStation 5, and Xbox Series X/S on December 4, 2026.

== Gameplay ==
A Game About Digging a Hole is a simulation video game where the player is tasked with digging as big of a hole as possible in the backyard of their newly purchased house with the promise of buried treasure. A large red X is featured on the grass. As the player digs, they encounter several randomly-generated ores of different value that the player can collect and sell to a barn. The money earned from selling ores can then be used to upgrade the player's shovel, battery pack, inventory space, or to buy explosives and a jetpack. The player can also purchase refills to their battery or health bar. As the player digs deeper, they will also encounter three moles that try to prevent the player from digging any further and acquiring any treasure. The game also supports achievements. Once the player beats the game for the first time, it unlocks a new achievement mode. There are 10 total achievements with 8 viewable in-game in the players garage.

== Development and release ==
A Game About Digging a Hole was developed by German studio Cyberwave and published by rokaplay Bou-tique. The game was created while Cyberwave was on a holiday break, using his free time to create the game in about 14 days using Unreal Engine 5. It was originally built around the voxel terrain mechanics from one of the studio's other games, Solarpunk, although this was quickly discarded and replaced it with technology based on another video game, Motherload. The developer then added digging mechanics to it as well as randomly spawning ores, and had a fully functional video game.

The game was announced in December 2024, and was subsequently wish-listed by over 100,000 people on Steam. A Game About Digging a Hole was released on February 7, 2025. Within a week of its release, the game sold over 250,000 copies.

A mobile port was announced on August 1, 2025. The game was made available on Xbox Game Pass in December 2025.

== Reception ==
Reception

Aggregate score
| Aggregator | Score |
|---|---|
| OpenCritic | 52% recommend (Note: Based on 21 reviews) |

A Game About Digging a Hole received "generally favorable" reviews from critics, according to the review aggregation website Metacritic. The game was positively received by critics and players. Giovanni Colantonio of Digital Trends stated that the game "taps into a simple joy", and takes a "mundane premise and [turns] it into something hypnotic". He also wrote that Cyberwave found "surprising depth in minimalism" with creating the game. Similarly, Gamereactor UK wrote that it was "surprising" how Cyberwave "managed to strike such an exquisite balance" between player progression and getting to the end of the game's story. He also praised the game for giving "[delivering] what it promises", and gave the game an eight out of ten score.

By August 2025, a million copies had been sold.
