= Chibig =

Spanish video game developer

- Type: Private
- Industry: Video games
- Founded: 2017; 9 years ago in València
- Area served: Worldwide
- Website: chibig.com

Chibig is an indie video game developer based in Valencia, Spain. They released the adventure game Summer in Mara in 2019 for PC, Nintendo Switch and PlayStation 4.

In 2025, their game Mika and the Witch Mountain became the bestselling Spanish video game after raising $1 million USD on Kickstarter. They also funded the game Elusive on Kickstarter, which reached its objective in two hours, and multiplied that amount by six after a month of campaigning.
