= Queen's Domain =

- Developer: Freshly Baked Games
- Publisher: Future Friends Game
- Platforms: Nintendo Switch 2, PlayStation 5, Windows, Xbox Series S/X
- Release: 30 October 2026
- Genre: Action role-playing

Queen's Domain is a 2026 first-person action role-playing game developed by Freshly Baked Games and published by Future Friends Games. It was released on 30 October 2026 for PlayStation 5, Xbox Series X/S, Nintendo Switch 2, and Windows. The player takes the role of Prince Berium, who shipwrecks upon the Isle of Neasied and sets out to defeat the evil witch Queen Siraatsu.

== Gameplay ==
Queen's Domain is an action role-playing game based around combat and exploration. The player controls Prince Berium, who starts with shipwrecking upon the Isle of Neasied, the main setting. The player explores the isle in a first-person perspective, battling creatures, taking quests, and gathering the means to open paths to biomes and dungeons.

Queen's Domain's combat involves a methodical pace that prioritises strategic moves during encounters with enemies. The player can fight with primary and secondary attacks. The player has a stamina bar, but can run indefinitely. When battling a foe with primary attacks, the player's total damage output is represented by the stamina bar, which is depleted completely after taking a swing. The player is forced to wait for it to refill for a full-power attack or initiate another attack with weaker strength. By holding the attack button, the player can perform a charged attack with increased damage, but with a drawback of taking even more time for the stamina bar to refill. The secondary attacks don't use stamina, but recharge over time after use. The player can equip up to three secondary weapons, including daggers, chakrams, or other throwable weapons.

Shortly into the adventure, the prince gains access to a sword blessed with Wind Gems, which corresponds to the level designs that make use of platforming. Wind Gem adds abilities to the player character, used to airdash to cross gaps, reach distant ledges, and search for hidden secrets. There are no autosaves, and death takes the player back to the last savepoint while erasing all progress.

== Development and release ==
Queen's Domain was co-developed by Eric Berger and Bradley Boothe. Berger was interested in video gaming as a teenager, creating maps and mods for Unreal Tournament, before joining Gearbox Software as a level designer at age 19. Throughout the career, he worked for several development studios, including GlyphX, Mad Doc Software and Airtight Games, before he decided it was time to make a game he wanted to play. Just before making the decision, during his stint at Final Strike Games working on Rocket Arena, Berger met Bradley Boothe, a software engineer who shared Berger's frustration with traditional studios. Together, they founded two-person indie developer Freshly Baked Games.

Berger and Boothe worked on a prototype for several years before they found out its scope was too ambitious for them, discarding it for a stripped-down first-person fantasy video game inspired by FromSoftware's King's Field series. The overall development for this version took three years.

Queen's Domain was announced in December 2025 with a playable demo available on the same day. It was published by Future Friends Game. It was released on 30 October 2026 for Nintendo Switch 2, Xbox Series X/S, PlayStation 5, and Windows.

== Reception ==
Reception

Aggregate scores
Aggregator	Score
Metacritic	(PC) 88/100 (PS5) 92/100 (NS2) 85/100
OpenCritic	95% recommend

According to the review aggregation website Metacritic, the PlayStation 5 version of Queen's Domain received critical acclaim from reviewers, while the PC and Nintendo Switch 2 versions of Queen's Domain both received generally favorable reviews from critics. Fellow review aggregator OpenCritic assessed that the game received "mighty" approval, being recommended by 95% of critics.

Within two weeks of its launch, the game surpassed 200,000 sales.
