= Cast n Chill =

2025 fishing game

- Developer: Wombat Brawler
- Engine: Unity
- Platforms: Windows; MacOS; Nintendo Switch 2
- Release: June 16, 2025 (Windows & MacOS); December 18, 2025 (Switch 2)
- Genres: Cozy; Fishing
- Mode: Single-player

Cast n Chill is a cozy fishing simulation video game developed and published by Australian studio Wombat Brawler. It was released for Windows and MacOS on June 16, 2025, and for Nintendo Switch 2 on December 18, 2025. The game uses a pixel art style and features two-dimensional side-scrolling movement with simple controls and a fully-automated "idle" mode which can be toggled at any point during gameplay.

Gameplay consists of driving a small fishing boat or snowmobile, catching fish and filling out a logbook, and selling the fish to unlock upgrades and new areas.

== Gameplay ==
Cast n Chill features a customizable player character and choice of pet. The gameplay consists of driving a small boat (and eventually a snowmobile in winter locations) in two-dimensional side-scrolling levels which use parallax scrolling to create the effect of three dimensions. Tips are shown on the top of the screen for new players.

The game's shopkeeper NPC, Rusty, offers various items and upgrades for purchase by the player.

The player can select from various rods and bait, with different combinations being more suitable to different sizes and species of fish. When the player casts the fishing line, the camera breaks below the surface, showing the fish available for catching; each fish species has a recognizable design. When a fish is hooked, the player has to balance fighting the fish with reeling it in; attempting to reel too quickly may result in snapping the fishing line and losing the catch.

Catching a fish displays a placard on-screen which displays the size and weight of the fish, and after catching a fish for the first time, an entry is unlocked in the game's log book, which replaces the silhouette of the fish with its full design, and lists each species' rarity, sizes, and bait preferences, as well as the number caught or released by the player and information about the biggest catch for each species.

The game also has an "idle" mode in which the game runs automatically, catching and selling fish without any input from the player.

Fish can be sold, and the money from selling them can be used at the in-game store – run by an NPC named Rusty – to purchase new rods, bait, different boats, as well as new locations, which are purchased as licenses.

== Reception ==
WellPlayed gives the game a 9 out of 10, noting that the art style, simple controls and variety among positives, and that "there's little to do after completing the logbook". Nintendo Life has a review for the Switch 2 edition, giving it a 9 out of 10 while stating the game can be repetitive, a point also made in a 7.1 out of 10 review by Hooked Gamers.
