= Rollin' Rascal =

Upcoming video game

- Developers: Curiomatic; Kiskadee Games
- Publishers: Curiomatic; Kiskadee Games
- Platforms: Windows; Nintendo Switch; Nintendo Switch 2
- Genre: Action
- Modes: Single-player, multiplayer

Rollin' Rascal is an upcoming action game developed and published by Curiomatic and Kiskadee Games. It has gameplay inspired by the Sonic the Hedgehog series, and funded with crowdfunding via Kickstarter. It is set to be released for Microsoft Windows, Nintendo Switch, and Nintendo Switch 2.

== Gameplay ==
Rollin' Rascal is a 3D action platformer. The developer describes the game as "a love letter to high-speed 3D platformers" like Sonic the Hedgehog and Super Mario Bros.. It contains gameplay elements from the 3D Sonic games, including the spin dash, rail grinding, and homing attack. The player takes control of Rascal, who has an ability to dash quickly similarly to Sonic. Rascal can take control of enemies and use their abilities for attacking themselves or other purpose. The game supports online multi-player races.

== Development and release ==
Rollin' Rascal is developed by Curomatic. The game's crowdfunding campaign was announced on 6 February 2024 and made a game demo available on the same day. The Kickstarter hit its funding goal of $50,000 under 12 hours.

The game was initially announced for Microsoft Windows, with console ports promised as the Kickstarter's stretch goal. The developer plans to launch the game for both Nintendo Switch and Nintendo Switch 2 after the goals were met.
