= Schrödinger's Call =

2026 video game

- Developer: Acrobatic Chirimenjako
- Publisher: Shueisha Games
- Platforms: Nintendo Switch; Windows; Nintendo Switch 2
- Release: Switch, Windows; May 28, 2026; Nintendo Switch 2; October 28, 2026
- Genres: Visual novel, adventure
- Mode: Single-player

Schrödinger's Call is an adventure visual novel developed by Japanese studio Acrobatic Chirimenjako and published by Shueisha Games. The first chapter of the game was released as a demo on Steam on February 10, 2026. The full game was released for Nintendo Switch and Windows on May 28, 2026. A Nintendo Switch 2 version was released on October 28, 2026.

== Gameplay ==
The player is tasked with answering calls from different characters, making notes about each caller's life and feelings. The words must be properly chosen if they want to speak to the "immortal" souls, save them and advance the story.

== Plot ==
The main protagonist, Mary, is a young girl who awakens in an unfamiliar room with no memories of her past. She discovers her purpose: to serve as humanity's final conversational companion during the 21 nanoseconds between life and death, as the moon falls and the world comes to an end. Mary is the last human left alive, and listens to immortal souls who want to be saved, as they share their life stories, regrets, and unspoken thoughts. Each conversation becomes an "act of salvation", helping souls process what they left behind. All characters except for Mary are presented as humanoid animals like cats, frogs or owls.

== Reception ==
Reception

Aggregate scores
Aggregator	Score
Metacritic	(PC) 90/100
OpenCritic	95% recommend

Review score
Publication	Score
Hardcore Gamer	4.5/5

The PC version of Schrödinger's Call received generally favorable reviews from critics, according to the review aggregation website Metacritic. Fellow review aggregator OpenCritic assessed that the game received "mighty" approval, being recommended by 95% of critics. In his review for Hardcore Gamer, Ivanir Ignacchitti summarized Schrödinger's Call as "an impressive adventure game that offers an emotional dive into various tragedies, using empathy as a guiding force", adding: "It's one of those games that is so fascinating to see in motion because it has something to say and a strong vision of how to present it in terms of atmosphere and style."

Some reviewers highlighted that Schrödinger's Call is "mixing the charming with the truly strange and uncomfortable in terms of graphics and concept". One of the creators of the game states that it is "definitely emotional" and that "there's nothing 'scary' about this game at all". The game won the grand prize in the game development contest GAME BBQ vol.1, held by Game Creators Camp in 2021.
