= Warrior Cats: Clans of the Forest =

Turn-based role-playing video game

- Developer: Bamtang Games
- Publisher: Trailmark Games
- Platforms: Microsoft Windows; PlayStation 5; Xbox Series X and S; Nintendo Switch; Nintendo Switch 2
- Release: 23 October 2026
- Genres: Turn-based role-playing game; Action-adventure game
- Modes: Singleplayer, multiplayer

Warrior Cats: Clans of the Forest is a turn-based role-playing game developed by Bamtang Games and published by Trailmark Games, based on the Warriors book series by Erin Hunter. It was released on 23 October 2026 for PC, PlayStation 5, Xbox Series X and Series S, Nintendo Switch, and Nintendo Switch 2.

== Gameplay ==
In Warrior Cats: Clans of the Forest, players create and customize their own player character cat, rather than playing as an established character, a choice made based on the prevalence of fan-created characters in the series' fanbase. Despite this, the player can encounter characters from the series throughout gameplay, as well as characters created specifically for the game. The player is locked into the role of a warrior, and is unable to pursue other roles seen in the original book series. Each of the four Clans (organized groups the cats live in) has its own campaign.

The combat in the game utilizes a turn-based system, with Clan-specific techniques, supporting up to three characters on each side of battle. Players can hunt prey, fight off predators (such as badgers, dogs, and snakes), and fight in battles against rival Clans. The player's base stats are dependent on their Clan, and increase over time with level and training.

Outside of the game's main story mode (known as "Prophecy Mode"), there are also two additional modes: "Defender", a boss rush mode, and "Skirmish", an asynchronous multiplayer mode. The player's "den" can also be customized using a variety of craftable items.

== Development ==
Warrior Cats: Clans of the Forest is the first officially licensed video game adaptation of the Warriors series, with the only previous foray into the medium being a Roblox social roleplaying game, Warrior Cats: Ultimate Edition. In an interview with IGN, Bamtang Games's creative director, Adam Johnson, said that the development team "had dedicated super fans" assisting them throughout development, and that their primary goal was to create a lore-accurate adaptation of the series and its world. The decision to make the combat turn-based was based on analyzing the combat scenes in the books, which are often intricately strategized rather than being wild, instinctive cat fights.

The violence of the original series was discussed internally, and ultimately chosen to be portrayed with stylized scars rather than realism, keeping the original target demographic of middle grade readers in mind.

== Release ==
Warrior Cats: Clans of the Forest was released on 23 October 2026 for PC, PlayStation 5, Xbox Series X and Series S, Nintendo Switch, and Nintendo Switch 2. It was released in a standard edition, alongside the "Feral Edition", which includes the "Prophecy Pack" DLC. The DLC contains bonus features and cosmetic accessories for player characters. More bonus cosmetics were available with the "Purrfect Look Pack" add-on via pre-ordering either edition of the game.

== Reception ==
The game received mixed reviews from critics. It received a score of 7 out of 10 from Screen Rant, praising it as a solid turn-based RPG for both franchise fans and newcomers, though it criticized the outdated graphics and uncanny animal designs.
