= Those Games =

2023 puzzle video game

Yeah! You Want "Those Games," Right? So Here You Go! Now, Let's See You Clear Them!
- Those Games 1+2 Steam bundle cover art
- Developer: Monkey Craft
- Publisher: D3 Publisher
- Platforms: Windows, Nintendo Switch, PlayStation 4, PlayStation 5, Nintendo Switch 2
- Release: Those Games; Windows, Nintendo Switch; July 19, 2023; PlayStation 4, PlayStation 5 January 11, 2024; Nintendo Switch 2 December 3, 2026; Those Games 2 July 17, 2024; Nintendo Switch 2 December 3, 2026; Those Games Extreme; April 23, 2025; Nintendo Switch 2 December 3, 2026
- Genres: Puzzle, parody
- Mode: Single-player minigames

Those Games (Note: Japanese: あのゲー, Hepburn: Ano Gē) (known in full as Yeah! You Want "Those Games," Right? So Here You Go! Now, Let's See You Clear Them! (Note: Japanese: どこかで見た“あのゲー”ムたちを棒人間で作ってみたけれど、果たしてあなたはクリアできるのか？, Hepburn: Dokoka de Mita "Ano Gē"mu-tachi o Bōningen de Tsukuttemita keredo, Hatashite Anata wa Kuria Dekiru no ka?; lit. "I Tried Making 'Those Games' You've Seen Somewhere With Stick Figures, But Will You Be Able To Clear Them?")) is a parody puzzle video game developed by Monkey Craft and published by D3 Publisher. It was released on July 19, 2023, for Microsoft Windows and the Nintendo Switch console, and later for PlayStation 4 and PlayStation 5 console on January 11, 2024. A sequel, Yeah! You Want "Those Games," Right? So Here You Go! Now, Let's See You Clear Them! 2 or Those Games 2, was released on July 17, 2024 for the same platforms. A compilation of the two games released on December 19, 2024, with a physical release in Japan. A third game titled Listen Up! We Tried to Make "Those Games" Even More Extreme! Some Things Have to Be Learned The Hard Way! (Note: Japanese: どこかで見た“あのゲー”ムたちをもっと激しく作ってみたけれど、棒人間には限界があった件。, Hepburn: Dokoka de Mita “Ano Gē”mu-tachi o Motto Hageshiku Tsukuttemita keredo, Bō Ningen ni wa Genkai ga Atta Ken.; lit. "I Tried Making 'Those Games' Even More Intense, But There's a Limit to What You Can Do With Stick Figures.") or Those Games Extreme, was released for the same platforms on April 23, 2025. Nintendo Switch 2 versions for all three games are set to release on December 3, 2026.

The series is a parody of mobile game advertisements that often depict fake minigames that are usually not representative of the actual game once downloaded. Those Games compiles the minigames typically seen in such advertisements and brings them to fruition in fully-realized levels. All of the game modes utilize stick figures to depict various characters.

== Gameplay ==
Those Games and Those Games 2 each consist of 250 levels across five different game modes, each based on various minigames depicted in mobile game advertisements. After each level, the player is ranked on a three-star ranking system based on time taken to complete the level, which go towards increasing the player's IQ rating and unlocking further levels. Achievements are earned based on completing all levels in a game-set, and by getting three stars on each level. Coins earned from the game allows players to unlock titles and plates for their customizeable nameplate, used for online leaderboards. Those Games Extreme has 155 levels (including tutorial levels) consisting of more challenging versions of minigames featured in previous entries.

=== Those Games ===
- Cash Run: (25 levels) – the player must traverse a course while collecting stacks of banknotes. The player must then use the stacks as building blocks to circumvent obstacles in the course. Further levels introduce differing obstacles such as spike traps, traffic cones, and gambling using probability.
- Color Lab: (50 levels) – liquid of various mixed colors are placed in test tubes. The player must sort each color into its own individual test tube.
- Number Tower: (50 levels) – a game of arithmetic where the player has a starting number. The player must then add, subtract, multiply, or divide the starting number based on the tower they select in order to have a greater number than the last tower in the puzzle.
- Parking Lot: (25 levels) – motor vehicles are arranged in varying directions in a parking lot. The player's objective is to move the vehicles on its set path horizontally or vertically, and maneuver each vehicle out of the parking lot.
- Pin Pull: (100 levels) – the player must pull various pins to manipulate elements of a level. Many levels consist of assisting a stick figure in reaching treasure while eliminating enemies such as wolves, goblins, and orcs. Others involve just eliminating the enemies and keeping the stick figure character out of harm's way.

=== Those Games 2 ===
- Knock Back Shooter: (100 levels) – the player must aim balls that ricochet off of walls to eliminate enemies without hitting themselves in the process.
- Pin Pull 2: (50 levels) – similar to the previous games Pin Pull mode, players must pull various pins to clear missions such as guiding embers to a fireplace.
- Numbers Dungeon: (25 levels) – players ascend through a dungeon, defeating enemies to raise their number, allowing them to fight tougher enemies.
- Spellbinding Scroll: (25 levels) – players fire love arrows to swoon oncoming fans, passing through gates to raise their attack power.
- Draw & Guard: (50 levels) – players draw lines around a cat to protect them from enemies and obstacles for a certain amount of time.

== Development ==
The game is developed by Osaka-based studio Monkey Craft, who are known for previously having developed Klonoa Phantasy Reverie Series, as well as leading the Reroll remasters of both Katamari Damacy and We Love Katamari. The game took eight months to develop, and was worked on by a group of 15–20 people.

== Reception ==
The AV Club lauded the "Pull the Pin" minigame, but stated that, although Those Games is initially "a genuine kick", ultimately the ideas of the other minigames are "just not robust enough" to merit a full game.
