= Ratatan =

2026 video game

- Developers: Ratata Arts; TVT
- Release: October 15, 2026
- Genre: Rhythm

Ratatan is a rhythm game released on October 15, 2026. The title is a spiritual successor to the series Patapon.

== Development ==
The game was announced by Ratata Arts and Tokyo Virtual Theory. Hiroyuki Kotani serves as director with Kemmei Adachi as director and game designer, Kemmei Adachi as composer, and Kazuto Sakajiri as producer. Initially unveiled at BitSummit 2023, a Kickstarter campaign for Ratatan went live on August 1, 2023, to support the project.

Ratatan was developed by Ratata Arts and TVT, with development led by Hiroyuki Kotani, creator of the Patapon series. The development team included composer Kemmei Adachi, who previously worked on Patapon and LocoRoco.

== Gameplay ==
Ratatan is a rhythm-based action and strategy game incorporating roguelite elements. Players control a character known as a Ratatan, who commands an army of smaller creatures called Cobun through musical sequences performed in time with the game's soundtrack. These commands direct the army to attack, retreat, jump and perform special abilities while navigating side-scrolling environments. Maintaining consecutive rhythmic commands activates a Fever mode that increases combat effectiveness.

== Release and reception ==
Reception

Aggregate score
Aggregator	Score
Metacritic	(PC) 68/100 (NS2) 75/100 (PS5) 72/100

The game is available on PlayStation 5, Xbox Series X and Series S, Nintendo Switch 2, and Microsoft Windows. It was officially released on October 15, 2026. According to the review aggregation website Metacritic, the Nintendo Switch 2 version of the game received generally favorable reviews from critics, while the PC and PlayStation 5 versions of the game both received "mixed or average" reviews from critics.
