= Lost and Found Co. =

2026 hidden object adventure game

- Developer: Bit Egg Inc.
- Publishers: Bit Egg Inc.; Gamirror Games
- Director: Natachanan Lumpikanon
- Designer: Jirawat Srirak
- Programmer: Napakamee Nunthidechapun
- Composer: Cherdrush Apiratiwut
- Engine: Unity
- Platforms: Windows; macOS; Nintendo Switch; Nintendo Switch 2
- Release: Windows, macOS; 6 March 2026; Switch, Switch 2; Early 2027
- Genre: Hidden object adventure
- Mode: Single-player

Lost and Found Co. is a 2026 hidden object adventure game developed by Thai studio Bit Egg Inc. and published by Bit Egg and Gamirror Games. It was released for Windows and macOS on 6 March 2026. It is scheduled to release for Nintendo Switch and Nintendo Switch 2 in early 2027.

Set in the fictional town of Plumville, the game follows Ducky, a duck transformed into a human boy by the goddess Mei, who helps her operate a lost-property business to restore her waning powers. Players search illustrated, animated scenes for hidden objects and characters, complete optional objectives, and decorate Ducky's room.

Lost and Found Co. received "universal acclaim" according to Metacritic. It won the Grand Jury Award at the 2024 SEA Game Awards and Thai Game of the Year at the 2026 Thai Game Awards. By August 2026, it had sold more than 100,000 copies.

== Gameplay ==
Gameplay takes place in densely populated isometric scenes in which the player searches for characters and objects.

Lost and Found Co. is played across illustrated isometric stages populated by animated characters and objects. Each stage presents a list of objects or people that the player must find by examining the scene and clicking on them. Some targets are concealed behind other objects and can only be found by interacting with the environment. Stages also contain optional objectives, some of which are discovered through interactions with characters or objects.

The main story comprises eleven chapters, each involving a client who seeks help from the Lost and Found Co. Finding the requested objects advances the client's story, while characters introduced in earlier chapters may reappear later. The game has more than fifteen stages, which players can revisit to finish optional objectives or restart. Short animated sequences between chapters advance the main story. The environments contain numerous interactive details, with objects responding when clicked and some interactions triggering additional events.

Completing objectives earns "likes", which are needed to advance through the story. An in-game social media feed tracks the popularity of the lost-property business and displays selfies taken with characters encountered during stages. Increasing the business's popularity unlocks additional scenarios and cosmetic items. Players can use a hint system to help locate difficult objects. Some objects are possessed by creatures called juju, which can be collected to obtain additional hints. The game also has separate requests and challenge stages outside the main story.

As the business grows, Mei's shrine becomes an office, and Ducky gains a room that the player can decorate. Furniture and other decorative items can be purchased from Kit, then moved, resized and layered within the room.

== Premise ==
Lost and Found Co. takes place in Plumville, where Mei, an ancient war goddess, has lost much of her power as the number of people worshipping her has declined. She transforms a duck named Ducky into a human boy, further weakening herself. After drinking a potion obtained with the help of a fox named Kit, Mei is transformed into a small dragon.

Mei and Ducky establish a lost-property business at her shrine, hoping that helping the townspeople will attract new worshippers and restore her powers. Meanwhile, the corporation OKCO, led by its masked chief executive Zorro, plans to demolish the shrine for a property development. Mei and Ducky must prevent its destruction while helping the residents of Plumville recover their belongings.

== Development and release ==
Lost and Found Co. was developed by Bit Egg Inc., an indie game studio based in Thailand. Natachanan Lumpikanon directed the game.

According to Bit Egg, the studio chose the hidden object format partly to make use of its experience with Spine animation. Lumpikanon wanted to create a game that would be accessible to people who did not regularly play video games. His mother's interest in hidden object games was one influence on this decision. The developers also wanted more animation and environmental interaction than they had encountered in other games of the genre, and designed the stages around moving characters and interactive objects.

A demo was released on Steam on 17 July 2023. The game was shown during the 2024 Wholesome Direct, when versions for computers and mobile devices were planned. In May 2024, Gamera Games was announced as the publisher for mainland China, Taiwan, Hong Kong and Macao. The publisher changed its name to Gamirror Games in April 2025.

The game was originally scheduled for release on 11 February 2026, but was delayed by several weeks. It was released through Steam for Windows and macOS on 6 March 2026.

In 2026, Bit Egg received Thailand's Prime Minister's Export Award for Best Service Enterprise in Digital Content & Software. The award's official profile identified Lost and Found Co. as the studio's flagship title.

The game received a summer update in June 2026, adding two stages, "Master of Findjutsu" and "My Summer Memories 2", Japanese and German localisation, and additional items for decorating Ducky's room. A further update on 1 October introduced the stages "Love After Life" and "Fangtastic Feast", Korean localisation, dialogue history, and more decorative items.

Nintendo Switch and Nintendo Switch 2 versions are scheduled to release in early 2027.

== Reception ==
Reception

Aggregate scores
Aggregator	Score
Metacritic	90/100
OpenCritic	90/100

Review scores
Publication	Score
GameGrin	10/10
Kakuchopurei	90/100
SECTOR.sk	9/10
Oyungezer	9/10
Quest Daily	8/10

Lost and Found Co. received "universal acclaim" according to review aggregator Metacritic, which reported a score of 90 out of 100 based on six critic reviews. OpenCritic reported an average score of 90 out of 100, with 95% of critics recommending the game.

Violet Plata of GameGrin awarded the game 10 out of 10, praising its animation, story, variety of requests, room-decoration system and detailed environments. Jonathan Toyad of Kakuchopurei gave it 90 out of 100, commending its visual presentation and relaxed pace. He also noted that the more densely populated stages required careful observation to find their hidden objects.

SECTOR.sk gave the game 9 out of 10. The reviewer enjoyed its animated environments, varied stages and accessible gameplay, but found the dialogue sequences too frequent and considered some of the environmental interactions underdeveloped. Eser Güven of Oyungezer also awarded it 9 out of 10, praising the continuing story, optional objectives and visual style. He particularly enjoyed the increasing size and difficulty of the stages.

Sonia Heng of Quest Daily gave the game 8 out of 10. She praised its hand-drawn artwork, animation and interactive environments, as well as the optional objectives. Heng described the animated interludes as giving the game the feel of a "quirky interactive anime". Her criticisms concerned occasional aimless clicking when objects were difficult to find and some minor bugs.

Sam Wachter of RPGamer enjoyed the integration of story and hidden-object gameplay, particularly the way characters introduced in individual stages returned later in the narrative. She also praised the variety of locations and optional objectives. However, she found the hint system unreliable, citing unclear wording and typographical errors. She was particularly critical of hints for the more difficult optional objectives.

=== Sales ===
By August 2026, Bit Egg reported that Lost and Found Co. had sold more than 100,000 copies worldwide.

=== Accolades ===
Year	Award	Category	Result
2024	SEA Game Awards	Grand Jury Award	Won
2024	SEA Game Awards	Best Visual Art	Won
2024	gamescom asia Pitch Competition	Most Anticipated Game	Won
2025	Taipei Game Show Indie Game Award	Best Audio	Finalist
2026	Thai Game Fest	Thai Game of the Year	Won
2026	Thai Game Fest	Best of Game Design	Won
2026	Thai Game Fest	Best of Visual	Won
2026	Thai Game Fest	Best of Music & Audio	Won
2026	Design Excellence Award (DEmark)	Illustration and Character Design	Won

== See also ==
- Hidden Folks, another illustrated hidden-object game with animated scenes
