= Pinball Action =

1985 video game

- Arcade flyer
- Developer: Tehkan
- Publisher: Tehkan
- Platform: Arcade
- Release: JP: July 1985; NA: January 1986
- Genre: Pinball
- Modes: Single-player, multiplayer

Pinball Action (Note: Japanese: ピンボールアクション, Hepburn: Pinbōru Akushon) is a 1985 pinball video game developed and published by Tehkan for arcades. It was released in Japan in July 1985 and in North America in January 1986. Hamster Corporation released the game as part of their Arcade Archives series for the Nintendo Switch and PlayStation 4 in April 2025, as well as the Arcade Archives 2 series for the Nintendo Switch 2, PlayStation 5, Xbox Series X/S and Windows in August 2026.

== Gameplay ==
Pinball Action features three separate pinball areas in addition to the starting area. Each of the additional 'faces' has a challenge which, when completed, allows a player access to a special three extra credits. The three faces feature challenges modelled on ten-pin bowling, poker, and slot machines. The game has a tilt feature which mimics the effect possible on a non-video pinball machine. While multiball is not possible in the game, there are a number of ways to earn extra balls. Extra balls are awarded at 70,000 and 200,000 points. High scores can be obtained via the game's generous bonus scoring system, with the highest score obtainable being in the millions.

== Reception ==
In a 2000 retrospective of arcade pinball video games, Pinball Action easily surpassed Atari's Video Pinball in graphics, game complexity and sound, but lacked "completely accurate ball physics".

== See also ==
- David's Midnight Magic
- Video Pinball
