= Steel Worker =

1980 video game

- Arcade flyer
- Developer: Taito
- Publisher: Taito
- Platform: Arcade
- Release: JP: March 1980; EU: 1980
- Genres: Puzzle, strategy
- Modes: Single-player, multiplayer

Steel Worker (Note: Japanese: スチールワーカー, Hepburn: Suchīru Wākā) is a 1980 puzzle-strategy video game developed and published by Taito for arcades. It was released in Japan in March 1980 and Europe the same year. It is similar in gameplay to DMA Design's Lemmings which came 11 years later. Hamster Corporation released the game as part of their Arcade Archives series for the Nintendo Switch and PlayStation 4, as well as their Arcade Archives 2 series for the Nintendo Switch 2, PlayStation 5 and Xbox Series X/S in September 2025.

== Gameplay ==
The player must help a construction worker navigate through levels while he does high-altitude work to prevent him from falling to his death. The player can place scaffolding leading the worker in both directions, diagonal pathways or stairs. One platform helps connect the levels while obstacles such as falling girders must be avoided. Levels end when the worker reaches his destination, though causing him to fall three times will end the game.
