= Pathea Games =

Chinese video game developer

- Type: Private
- Industry: Video games
- Founded: 2010; 16 years ago
- Founder: Zifei Wu
- Headquarters: Chongqing, China
- Key people: Zifei Wu (Founder)
- Products: My Time at Portia; The God Slayer
- Website: patheagames.com

Pathea Games is a Chinese independent video game developer and publisher based in Chongqing, China. It was founded in 2010 by Zifei Wu, who also serves as the creative director.

The company is best known for its farm life sim role-playing games, My Time at Portia (2019) and My Time at Sandrock (2023).

== History ==
Pathea Games was founded by newcomer entrepreneur Zifei Wu, who had no experience with startup businesses. He admitted, "I didn't know how to run a company, hire people, or even manage a team to create a good game. I just thought that if I made a fun game on Steam, it would be a huge success." Their first released game was regarded a failure, and instead of rushing to put out another one, he assessed its issues, including marketing. They found greater success with My Time at Portia, which subsequently led to its sequel, My Time at Sandrock, in 2023.

In mid-2023, it was revealed of their upcoming open-world action RPG The God Slayer, marketed as part of Sony Interactive Entertainment's China Hero Project. Unlike their previous games, it is their first triple-A which features elemental combat and an Eastern-inspired backdrop. Set in the Zhou Kingdom, players control Cheng, a young Elemancer who witnessed his family brutally murdered by the Celestials. He embarks on a quest for vengeance and to help save his people. The God Slayer is anticipated to be released in late 2027.

On September 17, 2024, Pathea announced the third installment of My Time series, where a Kickstarter was launched on September 24 to help fund the project. Due to the positive reception surrounding the second game's multiplayer mode, it will be included in the third. It will also feature a cooperative mode, where up to four players can join.

== Games developed ==
Year	Title	Platform(s)
2016	Planet Explorers	Microsoft Windows, OS X, Linux
2019	My Time at Portia	Nintendo Switch, PlayStation 4, PlayStation 5, Windows, Xbox One, Xbox Series X/S
2020	Ever Forward	Nintendo Switch, PlayStation 4, PlayStation 5, Windows
2023	My Time at Sandrock	Nintendo Switch, PlayStation 4, PlayStation 5, Windows, Xbox One, Xbox Series X/S
2023	Let's School	Microsoft Windows, Nintendo Switch, PlayStation 4, PlayStation 5, Xbox One, Xbox Series X/S
2027	My Time at Evershine	Nintendo Switch 2, PlayStation 5, Windows, Xbox Series X/S
2027	The God Slayer	Windows, PlayStation 5, Xbox Series X/S
