= Pathea =

Pathea may refer to:

- Plural of Pathos
- Pathea Games, a video game developer that made My Time at Portia and My Time at Sandrock

== See also ==
- Panthea
