= Coral Island (video game) =

- Developer: Stairway Games
- Publisher: Humble Games
- Engine: Unreal Engine 4
- Platforms: PlayStation 5; Windows; Xbox Series X/S; Nintendo Switch 2
- Release: PS5, Windows, Xbox Series X/S; November 14, 2023; Nintendo Switch 2; December 7, 2026
- Genre: Farm life sim
- Modes: Single-player, multiplayer

Coral Island is a 2023 farming simulation game developed by Stairway Games and published by Humble Games. Coral Island entered early access for PC in October 2022, and was fully released for PC and game consoles on November 14, 2023. A version for Nintendo Switch 2 is set to release on December 7, 2026.

== Gameplay ==
The player controls a customizable protagonist who moves to a small community on a tropical island. Upon arrival, the protagonist is given an overrun farm and is tasked with restoring it and planting crops. Additional game mechanics include fishing, catching bugs, fighting monsters, exploring mines, and diving underwater to clean an oil spill. Players can also interact and form relationships with the town’s non-player characters (NPCs). As players' relationships with characters develop, they can unlock additional dialogue and storylines. Marriage is available, including options for same-sex partnerships, and players have the opportunity to conceive a child with their chosen partner.

The game includes an offering system tied to four altars located throughout the island. Each altar requires six offerings based on crops, animal products, foraged items, mineable resources, and insects and fish. The offerings can be submitted in any order, and players can receive a reward upon completing the entire bundle.

Each in-game day is tracked by a time and energy system that determines how many activities the player can perform. Events such as town festivals and character birthdays occur on specific days throughout the calendar. The player has an Energy bar and a Health bar, the former is depleted by performing actions with tools, while the latter is used when mining and in combat with monsters.

== Plot ==
The protagonist returns to Starlet Town, their hometown on Coral Island, to work on a farm there. The town is in disarray due to both an oil spill and giant dark roots appearing on the island, and it may be forced to cooperate with an oil-drilling company called Pufferfish Corporation, which secretly plans to convert the town into an oil facility. The protagonist sets out to revive the island and prevent the corporation from taking control of it, all while befriending the townsfolk, providing new products for the town's supermarket, and increasing the museum's popularity. During their mission, the protagonist meets the Chieftain, the leader of a group of monkey-like creatures called giants. The Chieftain grants the protagonist the power of nature and has them help revive his four fellow giants, who have been turned to stone in the mines. To do so, the protagonist must enter the mines and activate the runes at the bottom of each shaft. The protagonist also helps the island's harvest goddess and meets the merfolk who live near the island. Initially wary of humans, the merfolk come to trust the protagonist after their coral tree is revived, which in turn fully restores the island and eliminates the roots and oil spill.

Once the town's popularity reaches Rank C, Karen, the corporation's CEO, becomes more determined to take over the town. She attempts to run for mayor, prompting the protagonist to stop her by persuading the townsfolk to reject her votes. When the town reaches Rank A, Pufferfish Corporation's headquarters is infested with vines, which forces it to stop its operations and leave Coral Island. The protagonist does additional missions such as helping the giants rescue their fifth comrade, assisting a group of creatures called the Mural Guardians, and guiding a group of merfolk during their journey on land.

== Development ==
Stairway Games, an Indonesian developer, chose to set the game in a similar setting. The game's character art was heavily influenced by Disney animation. On Kickstarter, Coral Island had one of the most successful video game crowd-funding campaigns in the first half of 2021. After entering early access in October 2022, Humble Games released Coral Island for Windows, PlayStation 5, and Xbox Series X/S on November 14, 2023.

Shortly after the game's early access release in 2022, an imposter account on social media targeted fans with non-fungible token (NFT) scams. In response, the developers issued a warning and clarified that Coral Island is not an NFT game.

Immediately following the effective closure of Humble Games in July 2024, Stairway Games was unable to release updates to the console versions of Coral Island, and the planned release for a Nintendo Switch version of the game was also put into doubt.

Cooperative multiplayer was added to the game with the 1.2 Multiplayer and Romance Update on August 14, 2025.

== Reception ==
=== Early access ===
In 2022, Rock Paper Shotgun noted that the game's current version contained bugs but described it as "mature" compared to other titles in early access. They recommended it to players looking for a game similar to Stardew Valley but with faster progression. GamesRadar+ acknowledged the similarities to other farming simulators, particularly Stardew Valley, but praised Coral Island for the execution of its game mechanics and unique aesthetics. In May 2023, TechRadar stated that they were "thoroughly excited" by the game's roadmap and that Coral Island demonstrated the genre of farm sims still had room for new games.

=== Release ===
Upon release, Coral Island received "generally favorable" reviews according to review aggregator Metacritic. Siliconera described Coral Island as "owing a lot" to previous games in its genre, and said that the game builds upon its influences and adds quality-of-life improvements. Although they called it essential for fans of farming simulators, they advised players to wait for bug fixes on the PlayStation 5 version. TouchArcade stated that Coral Island "feels unfinished in parts" and may have left early access too soon. However, they said it has "a fantastic base to build on" and is a "joy to play" on the Steam Deck despite some technical issues. Gayming Magazine considered Coral Island to be derivative, but noted the game's inclusive character designs and choices, such as offering LGBTQ romance options for the player character and having non-player characters with diverse body types. GameSpot included Coral Island in its list of hidden gems released in 2023 and called it "a breath of fresh air" for the genre for its tropical setting, diverse cast, large map, and compelling story. GamesRadar+ included Coral Island in their list of the best farming games, and Rock Paper Shotgun included it in a list of the "best farming games like Stardew Valley on PC".

Coral Island was nominated for the "Sit Back And Relax" award in the 2023 Steam Awards.

== See also ==
- Fields of Mistria
- My Time at Sandrock
- Sun Haven
