= A Whisper of Fall: Jinyiwei =

Upcoming video game

- Developer: CangMo Game Entertainment
- Engine: Unreal Engine 5
- Platforms: PlayStation 5; Windows
- Genre: Action role-playing
- Mode: Single-player

A Whisper of Fall: Jinyiwei, formerly known under the working title Project: Jinyiwei, is an upcoming action role-playing game developed by CangMo Game Entertainment. It will be available for the PlayStation 5 and PC.

== Plot ==
The game takes place during the Ming Dynasty and features a Jinyiwei protagonist who gets drawn into a conspiracy related to the events of the era.

== Gameplay ==
A Whisper of Fall: Jinyiwei is an action roleplaying game. It heavily features stealth and assassination mechanics. The player can move silently, climb vertical walls, climb onto roofs, and perform assassinations from behind, and the game is designed for players to sneak through parts of the levels. The core combat system consists of common mechanics such as "block", "rebound," "execution" and "Dodge" as well as managing the player's "True Qi" and "Inner Breath." True Qi increases when a player successfully counterattacks or breaks enemy attacks. Running out of True Qi makes the player more susceptible to damage. Inner Breath is a stamina bar that is used up when evading attacks. There are multiple weapon systems in the game, including swords, guns, and double knives. There is martial arts combat as well. The game will feature multiple side quests.

== Development ==
CangMo Game Entertainment was established in 2022 with an initial investment from Hometown Interactive. The company consisted of six people in January 2024. Development is headed by Liu Qiwei, also known as Li You, who previously created the game JianPo, which released in 2021. In July 2024 CangMo joined PlayStation's China Hero Project, which is run by Sony Interactive Entertainment Shanghai. In August 2024, it received another round of funding, with Shanghai Yingche Network Technology Co buying 25.8% of the shares. The game was developed in Unreal Engine 5. It was featured in ChinaJoy 2024.

In late 2024, the studio decided to upgrade the project from an indie-level production to an AA-level production. As the previous plan had a smaller scope, the developers originally expected a development cycle of two years.
