= Starsand Island =

- Developer: Seed Sparkle Lab
- Publisher: Seed Sparkle Lab
- Platforms: Nintendo Switch 2; PlayStation 5; Windows; Xbox Series X/S
- Release: 18 August 2026
- Genre: Life simulation

Starsand Island (Chinese: 星砂岛) is a 2026 life simulation game developed and published by Seed Sparkle Lab. It is being developed for Nintendo Switch 2, PlayStation 5, Windows, and Xbox Series X/S. It was released into Steam early access on 11 February 2026, with the 1.0 version launching on 18 August 2026.

== Gameplay ==
Starsand Island is a life simulation game where the customizable player character begins a life in Starsand, their childhood place. Solara, the player character's childhood friend, gives a guide of how to make progress in the beginning of the game. The player can choose different careers, including an angler, crafter, explorer, farmer, or rancher.

The game has romance and friendship system with which the player can nurture relationships with NPC inhabitants.

== Development and release ==
Starsand Island was developed by Chinese studio Seed Sparkle Lab and produced by Golton Gao, with investment from Kingsoft and its subsidiary Amazing Seasun Games. The game was first announced on 6 May 2024. The game was originally announced to be released for Microsoft Windows in Q4 2025. Other considered platforms were PlayStation 5, Xbox Series X/S, and Nintendo Switch. A crowdfunding campaign was launched at Kickstarter to fund the game's development. The Kickstarter campaign ended on 31 May 2025, earning over $300,000.

The game released into early access for Windows and Xbox Series X/S on 11 February 2026, with a full release for Windows, Nintendo Switch 2, PlayStation 5, and Xbox Series X/S on 18 August 2026. It will have a collaboration event with Pathea Games' My Time at Portia, featuring two characters from that game. The developers have further promised to allow players to define their own "life story" through daily activities, relationships, and choices. It has been considered a cosy game by Emma-Jane Betts of GamesRadar+.

The game was temporarily delisted from Steam due to unauthorized use of visual elements from an unspecified title. It was theorized as a reaction to the game's minigame copying Tetris. The developer promised a free DLC costume as a compensation to players.

== Reception ==
Reception

Aggregate scores
Aggregator	Score
Metacritic	(PC) 67/100 (NS2) 52/100 (PS5) 70/100
OpenCritic	44% recommend (Note: Based on 27 reviews)

The PC, Nintendo Switch 2, and PlayStation 5 versions of Starsand Island all received "mixed or average" reviews from critics, according to the review aggregation website Metacritic. Fellow review aggregator OpenCritic assessed that the game received fair approval, being recommended by 44% of critics.
