= PlayStation Hero Projects =

Incubator program for game developers

The PlayStation Hero Projects are initiatives launched by Sony Interactive Entertainment (SIE) that provide financial support and mentorship to video game developers from underrepresented regions, helping them bring their games to a global audience. The project started in 2016 in China and has since expanded to India, the Middle East and North Africa.

== History ==
=== China Hero Project ===
After China partially lifted its ban on gaming consoles in January 2014, SIE launched the PlayStation 4 in the country in March 2015. However, the company struggled to gain a foothold in the Chinese market due to its decade-long absence and a user base that differed significantly from overseas markets. To address this, SIE laid out three policies at the 2016 PlayStation China Press Conference in Shanghai: "1) localizing excellent overseas titles and promoting community activities, 2) enhancing domestic Chinese titles, and 3) improving game development capabilities in China by promoting the China Hero Project." It was further explained that the project's goal was to support Chinese development studios in creating games for home consoles and bringing them to the global market, with backing from development tool providers, such as CRI Middleware and Silicon Studio. An initial example was also presented: Project Boundary, a multiplayer first-person shooter set in outer space. Further applications could be submitted starting on August 15, 2016. In March 2017, SIE presented the ten games, out of over 400 applications, that were accepted for the China Hero Project (Chinese: 中国之星计划; lit. 'China's star plan'). On March 7, 2019, SIE announced the second phase of the China Hero Project, which included 7 new titles. Due to the COVID-19 pandemic, the project came to a standstill, until a third phase was announced in November 2022. Bao Bo, Sony's director of China game production, declared that "the scale of the third phase [would] far exceed the previous two" and that each game would receive at least 1 million yuan. The first three titles were revealed in May 2023 during the 2023 Sony Expo: Awaken: Astral Blade, Exiledge and Will-less. The next three titles were revealed in July of the same year, ahead of Chinajoy 2023: The God Slayer, The Winds Rising and Daba: Land of Water Scar. A year later, once again right before Chinajoy, three more titles were announced: Unending Dawn, Kroraina (Loulan) and Project: Jinyiwei.

=== India Hero Project ===
During the India Game Developer Conference in May 2023, Sony announced the India Hero Project. Five games that were accepted were announced in March 2024. Each of the developers was eligible to receive at least $100,000, paid after the developers hit certain milestones and pass a review process, and also mentorship and access to SIE's internal resources.

=== MENA Hero Project ===
In August 2024, SIE announced a Hero Project for the Middle East and North Africa, more specifically for developers from Saudi Arabia, the United Arab Emirates, Bahrain, Iraq, Kuwait, Oman, Qatar, Jordan, Egypt, Morocco, and Tunisia.

== Games ==
=== China Hero Project ===
Phase	Title	Developer	Status	Ref.
1	Boundary (formerly Project Boundary)	Studio Surgical Scalpels	cancelled	
1	Lost Soul Aside	Ultizero Games	released in 2025	
1	The Walker	Haymaker	released in 2018	
1	Animal Force (formerly The X Animal)	Internet Stars	released in 2018	
1	Project X	Komogames	no recent updates	
1	Tiger Knight	NetDragon	released	
1	Pervader VR	Light & Digital	cancelled	
1	Hardcore Mecha (formerly Code: Hardcore)	Rocket Punch	released in 2019	
1	Immortal Legacy: The Jade Cipher (formerly Kill X)	Viva Games	released in 2019	
2	F.I.S.T.: Forged In Shadow Torch	TiGames	released in 2021	
2	In Nightmare	Magic Fish Games	released in 2022	
2	Anno: Mutationem	Thinking Stars	released in 2022	
2	Evotinction	Spikewave Games	released in 2024	
2	Lost Islands	Jolly Roger Game	released in 2024	
2	Convallaria	Loong Force	in development	
2	AI Limit	Sense Games	released in 2025	
3	Awaken: Astral Blade	Dark Pigeon Games	released in 2024	
3	Exiledge	Enigmatrix	in development	
3	Will-less	Cyaniris Game	in development	
3	The God Slayer	Pathea Games	in development	
3	The Winds Rising	TiGames	in development	
3	Daba: Land of Water Scar	DarkStar Games	in development	
3	Unending Dawn	Parcae's Fate	in development	
3	Kroraina (Loulan)	LiangWu Games	in development	
3	A Whisper of Fall: Jinyiwei (formerly Project: Jinyiwei)	Cang Mo Games	in development	

=== India Hero Project ===
Title	Developer	Status	Ref.
Requital: Gates of Blood	Holy Cow Productions	in development	
SURI: The Seventh Note	Tathvamasi Studios	in development	
Meteora: The Race Against Space Time	Big Boot Games	in development	
Fishbowl	imissmyfriends.studio	in development	
Mukti	underDOGS Studio	in development	

=== MENA Hero Project ===
Title	Developer	Country	Status	Ref.
Red Bandits	Team Agenda	Saudi Arabia	in development	
Enci's Solution	Dark Emerald	United Arab Emirates	in development	
The Perfect Run	Lanterns Studio	Tunisia	in development	
A Cat's Manor	Happiest Dark Corner	Bahrain	in development	
