= Boundary (video game) =

Defunct 2023 video game

- Developer: Studio Surgical Scalpels
- Publishers: Skystone Games; Huya Games
- Engine: Unreal Engine 4
- Platform: Windows
- Release: April 13, 2023 (early access)
- Genre: First-person shooter
- Mode: Multiplayer

Boundary was a multiplayer first-person shooter set in outer space, developed by Studio Surgical Scalpels. It was published in the Greater China region by Huya and internationally by Skystone Games. The game launched in early access on April 13, 2023, but was shut down in 2024 following a dispute between the developer and publisher.

== Gameplay ==
Boundary was a multiplayer first-person shooter set in outer space, where players engaged in 5v5 battles amidst floating debris and the remains of demolished space stations. The game featured classic game modes such as Team Deathmatch and Domination, and gave players complete freedom of movement.

== Development and release ==
The combat takes place in outer space surrounded by cosmic debris.

The game was first presented to the press as Project Boundary during the PlayStation China press conference, which was held in July 2016, one day before ChinaJoy. It was announced for the PlayStation 4 as part of Sony’s China Hero Project, a new program to promote China-based developers and bring their games to the global market. At ChinaJoy 2018, Sony Interactive Entertainment Shanghai released a new trailer, which stated that the game would release in 2019. In 2019, Studio Surgical Scalpels announced that the game would be called simply Boundary and that it would get a worldwide release. The developer also showed interest in potential Xbox One and PC versions. Later in the same year, during the Gamescom, it was announced that Huya would publish the game, the release was delayed to 2020 and the game would also release for PC.

In September 2020, Studio Surgical Scalpels released a new trailer celebrating the completed development. In early 2021, it was disclosed that Skystone Games, a new game publisher founded by Blizzard North co-founder David Brevik, would take over the global release of Boundary, except for the Greater China region, which would be left to Huya. Furthermore the release date was pushed back to summer of the same year.

On April 13, 2023, the game was launched as early access title for Windows, with the developer anticipating a full launch within six months to a year. Within 24 hours the game sold over 100 thousand copies. In June 2024, Skystone Games announced that it would be relinquishing the publishing rights for Boundary at the end of the month, citing ongoing delays and a lack of updates from the developer as the primary reasons for the decision. Studio Surgical Scalpels released their own statement, describing Skystone's decision as "extremely sudden and unreasonable". Furthermore the studio mentioned that it was "trying to regain the rights related to the operation of Boundary" and that "so far, the studio has not been able to recover the income it deserves from Skystone". As of January 2026, the game is still unavailable for purchase.

== Reception ==
Tyler Wilde of PC Gamer doubted that Boundary would be the next big FPS sensation, but his overall impressions of the game were largely positive.

Less than two weeks after its launch, the game had earned a "Mostly Positive" rating on Steam. Most of the negative feedback focused on issues that are fixable and not fundamental to the core design, such as balance problems, server issues and a steep learning curve for new players.
