= Nintendo Switch 2 Welcome Tour =

2025 video game

- Artwork
- Developers: Nintendo EPD; Nintendo Cube (Note: Additional work by CAProduction)
- Publisher: Nintendo
- Platform: Nintendo Switch 2
- Release: June 5, 2025
- Mode: Single-player

Nintendo Switch 2 Welcome Tour (Note: Japanese: Nintendo Switch 2 のひみつ展, Hepburn: Nintendō Suitchi Tsū no Himitsuten) is a 2025 video game developed by Nintendo EPD and Nintendo Cube and published by Nintendo for the Nintendo Switch 2. Released worldwide on June 5, 2025, as a launch title for the console, it is only available digitally on the Nintendo eShop.

As an introduction to the Nintendo Switch 2 system, Welcome Tour consists of 170 trivia questions and quizzes, 20 minigames, and 14 tech demos that showcase the console's different features and design in a virtual exhibition setting resembling the console.

The game was controversial upon announcement and had a mixed critical reception upon release, primarily due to it being priced and sold separately rather than being bundled as a pack-in with the console.

== Gameplay ==
On the right, the player is shown how magnets are used to attach the controller to the console, while the player character stands on a giant controller.

The game is essentially a "digital gallery" of small minigames, each designed to demonstrate certain functions of the system. There are four main activities, namely the following, collecting stamps at podiums that mark each point of interest on the accessory the player is on, tech demos that show off a feature of the Switch 2, minigames with a high-score system, and information desks that teaches the player about a certain part of the console followed by a quiz at the end of each.

As the player progresses, the player earns medals, and a checklist displays how many they have left to collect.

The game also features challenges that require a USB webcam, the GL/GR buttons found on the Charging Grip or Pro Controller, and a ultra-high-definition television. The missions can be skipped, but completing them with the accessories is needed to obtain a gold medal.

== Release ==
Welcome Tour was announced on April 2, 2025, in a Nintendo Direct focused on the Nintendo Switch 2. The title became controversial when it was announced that the game would be paid rather than a pack-in title, costing $9.99USD or $14.99CAD. Many consumers and journalists believed the game should have been free with the console, drawing negative comparisons to Wii Sports for the Wii. Reggie Fils-Aimé, former president of Nintendo of America, also seemingly criticized the decision after discussing the importance of pack-in titles.

The title was released on June 5, 2025, the same day as the Nintendo Switch 2, via the Nintendo eShop.

== Reception ==
Reception

Aggregate scores
Aggregator	Score
Metacritic	54/100
OpenCritic	24% recommended

Review scores
Publication	Score
Destructoid	3/10
Digital Trends	3/5
Edge	3/10
Eurogamer	3/5
Game Informer	6/10
GameSpot	6/10
GamesRadar+	3/5
IGN	5/10
Nintendo Life	8/10
Shacknews	7/10
Video Games Chronicle	3/5
The Jimquisition	1/10

According to review aggregator website Metacritic, Nintendo Switch 2 Welcome Tour received "mixed or average" reviews, based on 55 reviews. At the time of its release, the title was one of the lowest-rated titles of 2025 according to Metacritic, in a list of games with more than 7 critical reviews, and is Nintendo's worst-reviewed game since Animal Crossing: Amiibo Festival (2015). 24% of critics recommended the game, according to OpenCritic.

Criticism mainly focused on the game being a paid addition, rather than a pack-in game for the console. Critics negatively compared the game to Nintendo Land (2012) for the Wii U or Astro's Playroom (2020) for PlayStation 5, both of which were pack-in titles for their respective consoles. Nintendo Life gave a positive review of the game, writing that the game is a "calming, surprisingly engaging hardware exhibition with a handful of cool minigames". Edge wrote that any enthusiasm was "inauthentic" and "forced through the mouths of NPCs" gawking at features in the exhibit.

Japanese outlets were more receptive to Nintendo Switch 2 Welcome Tour. Game*Spark wrote that the minigames worked well at demonstrating the technology and would appeal to people interested in technical specifications. Kenta Hatakenaka of GAME Watch compared the game to 1-2-Switch (2017) and Wii Play (2006), noting that the games are examples of game software that introduces console hardware through mini-games. He also opined that Welcome Tour stands out by offering a deeper explanation of the mechanisms compared to those earlier titles. Toshin Kagami from Real Sound praised the game for clearly explaining the mechanisms in an easy-to-understand way and found the tech demos interesting. He also notes that the game provides a good experience as a virtual museum. However, Kagami criticized the minigames and the pricing, writing "I wouldn't recommend this to people who just want to play fun games on the Switch 2."

=== Sales ===
As reported by Newzoo, the game was the second best-selling digital game during its first month on the Nintendo eShop behind Deltarune.

=== Awards ===
On December 10, 2025, the game won the inaugural GameStop award for "Worst Game of the Year". The award was presented by James Rolfe as the Angry Video Game Nerd.
