= Lost Soul Aside =

2025 video game

- Developer: Ultizero Games
- Publisher: Sony Interactive Entertainment
- Director: Yang Bing
- Producer: Yang Bing
- Engine: Unreal Engine 4
- Platforms: PlayStation 5 Windows
- Release: 29 August 2025
- Genre: Action-adventure role-playing
- Mode: Single-player

Lost Soul Aside (Note: Chinese: 失落之魂; pinyin: Shīluò Zhī Hún.) is a 2025 action-adventure role-playing game developed by Ultizero Games and published by Sony Interactive Entertainment. The player assumes the role of Kaser, who embarks on a quest to save his sister Louisa and the rest of humanity from the Voidrax. The game began as a solo project by the developer Yang Bing, but it became part of Sony's China Hero Project and gradually grew into a team effort.

Lost Soul Aside was released for PlayStation 5 and Windows on 29 August 2025. It received mixed reviews from critics.

== Gameplay ==
Lost Soul Aside is an action-adventure role-playing game. It is played in single-player mode from a third-person perspective.

The player controls Kaser, who is aided by Arena, a companion capable of transforming into weapons and other elements used in battles and throughout the journey. Kaser can wield a sword, greatsword, poleblade, and scythe as weapons. He can also unleash Arena powers, which are abilities that have offensive and other effects.

The game follows a linear progression interspersed with a few open areas. The character Liana functions as the manual save system and hub for the player at specific points in the game. Within the story, she frequently encounters Kaser throughout the journey and documents his adventures for her novel.

The game includes the Surge of Voidrax, a challenge mode that features a hundred waves of enemies.

== Synopsis ==
Kaser and his younger sister Louisa were orphaned during the war between the Empire of Celestria and the Kingdom of Frosthold. They eventually joined GLIMMER, a resistance group led by Selene, against the Empire's tyranny.

During a festival in Primarius, the capital of the Empire, GLIMMER launches an operation to inspire the populace to rise up. However, the mission is disrupted by the arrival of the Voidrax, mysterious invaders from beyond dimensions, who devastate the capital and seize the souls from its inhabitants. Amid the destruction, Kaser falls into a vast underground laboratory and encounters Lord Arena, a dragon-like Voidrax, imprisoned within. Kaser merges with Arena's essence and is thus imbued with its power. They both escape to the surface. Vesper of the Holy Order drags Louisa into the onslaught in a bid to save himself, so her soul is captured by the invaders. Hereafter, Kaser and his companions embark on a quest to save Louisa and the rest of humanity.

Kaser, Arena, and Gethya travel to Mount Salvation in search of answers. Kaser and Arena fight the four Lords and release them from corrupted Voidrax energy. Their path leads them to Queen Seleria, who guards the seal imprisoning the Voidrax, including their leader Aramon, who once attempted to conquer the world and seize its Life Nexus. In an effort to break the seal, Aramon corrupts Voidrax energy to obtain control over others and commands the Voidrax to amass souls into five soul crystal fragments scattered across alternate dimensions to increase his power. In order to help Kaser and Arena gather the fragments, Seleria reveals the entrance to the Chronocore Dimension, where the duo retrieves a fragment, and discloses a few places to find other alternate dimensions. In Primarius, Emperor HighCastle empowers Victor and Vesper of the Holy Order with corrupted Voidrax energy and orders them to hunt down the resistance.

Throughout the quest, Kaser and Arena retrieve the soul crystal fragments from alternate dimensions. Kaser, Arena, and Gethya go to the Skycrest Badlands, while the Holy Order and Imperial Army pursue them. Kaser and Arena fight and kill the Voidrax that took Louisa's soul. They fight the Buckhorn Spirit-Dragon and release it from corrupted Voidrax energy. In return, the creature uses its power to open the way to the Aeroflux Dimension for them. The Empire unexpectedly releases all captured resistance members and civilians. HighCastle offers the Empire and Holy Order's assistance in GLIMMER's battle against the Voidrax threat. Nonetheless, Kaser and his companions remain wary of his motives. Kaser, Arena, and Gethya visit Mistwood. Kaser and Arena fight Master Neverwind and his disciples, including Zana, and release them from corrupted Voidrax energy. The master tells the duo that the Lethonix Dimension can be accessed through Seleria's ancestral shrine. Zana knows the way and leads them there. In Primarius, Vesper terrorizes and abuses the people of the slums, while Victor and Selene try to stop him. HighCastle kills Vesper and asserts his control. Kaser, Arena, and Zana continue to Frosthold. On the way, Zana shares that the King of Frosthold is her father and might be able to help. Kaser proves his worth in combat against Chief General Drogo, so the general expends Voidrax energy and thereby sacrifices his life to lower the storm-wall guarding the realm. The group discovers that the king is overtaken by corrupted Voidrax energy, but Kaser and Arena fight him and release him from the energy. The duo heads to the entrance of the Entropis Dimension, a place that is collapsing due to Voidrax energy depletion. Finally, in Primarius, HighCastle brings Kaser and Arena to the entrance of the Dragon Ruin Dimension, a place that has collapsed. He extorts the fragments by threatening to execute citizens and uses the fragments to transform himself into a powerful being. Nevertheless, he is slain in combat by Kaser, Arena, Zana, and Victor.

Kaser, possessing all the soul crystal fragments, prepares for the ultimate confrontation with Aramon. Seleria and the four Lords sacrifice themselves to bestow their power upon Kaser. Aramon reveals that he had manipulated Emperor HighCastle and the King of Frosthold into extracting Voidrax energy from the alternate dimensions, which weakened the seal. In a cosmic battle, Kaser and Arena destroy Aramon. At the Life Nexus, Kaser and his companions release the captured souls from the soul crystal. Kaser reunites with Louisa. The Empire pursues equality for its people and restores relations with Frosthold. Arena leaves for parts unknown.

== Development ==
Lost Soul Aside is a game developed by Ultizero Games and published by Sony Interactive Entertainment. Ultizero Games is based in Shanghai, China. The game was originally conceived as a solo project by Yang Bing, but it evolved into a team effort over the years. It was built using Unreal Engine 4.

Yang Bing started the development of Lost Soul Aside in 2014. At the time, he was a graduate student at Dongguk University in South Korea. After the game's initial reveal in a promotional video uploaded to Yang's YouTube channel in July 2016, Sony took notice and reached out him, as the company was interested in discussing the project and exploring a potential collaboration. In 2016, the two parties met in Shanghai, which marked the start of their partnership. In October 2016, Sony offered a place for the game in its China Hero Project. Yang regarded the opportunity to receive funding and technical support from Sony as a big deal, considering that China's console game market was not established, so he participated in the China Hero Project and worked closely with the people involved starting in 2016. With support from Sony and its game industry partners, Yang founded Ultizero Games in January 2017. Sony officially became the game's publisher in 2022. According to Yang, during a particularly challenging phase of development, Sony proposed a deeper level of cooperation that established its publishing role and helped the project get back on track. The Sony team worked jointly with the studio on certain aspects of development, such as project management, performance optimization, music and sound, and other areas. Yang attributed the game's long development cycle largely to early inexperience and the time required to build a capable team.

Tatsuo Eguchi, President of Sony Interactive Entertainment Shanghai, said that Lost Soul Aside was very significant for the start of the China Hero Project. He explained that it led to the idea that the Sony team might be able to help creators like Yang achieve their dreams if they provided various know-how and support. The game was part of the China Hero Project Phase 1, which launched in 2016.

In 2021, the game's overall tone was established, which was reflected in that year's trailer, and set the direction for the remainder of the development. The story outline always involved Kaser and his dragon companion Arena, but there was initially no clear conception of their relationship or the stories that they experience. This gradually took shape after the formation of the studio. The original concept was a lonely adventure undertaken by a person and a dragon, but additional characters as companions and their corresponding storylines were introduced to help make the world feel richer. The addition of these characters marked a shift from the 2016 trailer, which had a relatively stronger sense of loneliness in its scenes.

Yang was inspired by the Final Fantasy series, which contain some of his favorite games, in the design. He was particularly captivated by how the series fused fantasy and realism in its world, a balance that he also sought to achieve. For instance, the protagonist's outfit was designed, then physically produced, and finally digitally recreated within the game, reflecting the intention to blend fantastical and realistic elements much like the aforementioned series. The design of the outfit was created by Roen, a Japanese fashion company. In terms of action, Yang was inspired by Japanese titles such as Bayonetta, Ninja Gaiden, and Devil May Cry.

== Release ==
Lost Soul Aside was released for PC (Windows) and PlayStation 5 on 29 August 2025.

Yang Bing unveiled Lost Soul Aside with a promotional video uploaded to his YouTube channel on 30 July 2016. During a press conference in March 2017, Sony Interactive Entertainment announced that the game had joined its China Hero Project. During a press conference in November 2022, the company announced that it would serve as the game's global publisher. The game was initially confirmed as a timed exclusive for PlayStation 4 in October 2016, but a PlayStation 5 version was confirmed in April 2021 and a PC version was confirmed in July 2023. Media outlets suggested that the PlayStation 4 version may have been canceled, as the most recent statement did not list PlayStation 4 among the supported platforms.

During the PlayStation China 10th Anniversary Party in December 2024, Ultizero Games released a trailer revealing that Lost Soul Aside would be released on PlayStation 5 and PC in 2025. During the State of Play in February 2025, the studio released a trailer announcing the release date as 30 May 2025. However, in April 2025, the studio stated that the release was moved to 29 August 2025.

For the launch, Lost Soul Aside received a Standard Edition and a Digital Deluxe Edition as its digital versions. The latter adds extra content comprising a soundtrack, an art book, an Arena cosmetic (Golden Blaze), three weapon fragment cosmetics, and two accessories. The game was available for pre-order starting in February 2025. Kaser's initial reveal outfit (The Origin) and a few other items were bonus incentives for pre-ordering.

For the launch, Lost Soul Aside received a Standard Edition as its physical version. This includes a disc containing the game and a voucher to redeem the pre-order bonus content comprising Kaser's initial reveal outfit (The Origin) and a few other items.

== Reception ==
Reception

Aggregate scores
Aggregator	Score
Metacritic	PC: 55/100; PS5: 62/100
OpenCritic	22% recommend

Lost Soul Aside received "mixed or average" reviews on PC and PlayStation 5 from critics, according to review aggregator Metacritic. It was recommended by 22% of critics, according to review aggregator OpenCritic.
