= Let's School =

2023 video game

- Developer: Pathea Games
- Publishers: Pathea Games; PM Studios
- Platforms: Microsoft Windows; Nintendo Switch; PlayStation 4; PlayStation 5; Xbox One; Xbox Series X/S
- Release: PC: July 26, 2023; Console: July 16, 2024
- Genre: Simulation
- Mode: Single-player

Let's School is a campus management simulation video game developed by Pathea Games. It was released for PC in July 2023 and for PlayStation 4, PlayStation 5, Xbox One, Nintendo Switch and Xbox Series X and Series S in July 2024.

== Gameplay ==
Let's School is a campus management simulation game, offering a blend of simulation and strategy. In the game, the player assumes control of a school principal, who must build the campus from scratch, design the curriculum for each form, recruit teachers, and manage crises. The game features both a career mode which guides players towards their objectives, and a sandbox mode which allows them to build their school with little to no limitation.

== Development and release ==
The game was developed by Pathea Games, best known for My Time at Portia. It was originally released as a PC game in 2023. It initially started as a passion project for a member of Pathea Games, though the studio moved members of the Portia team to assist the game's development.

It was released for the PlayStation 4 and 5, the Xbox One and Xbox Series X and S, and Nintendo Switch on July 16, 2024.

== Reception ==
According to Metacritic, Let's School received "mixed or average" reviews.

Stephanie Liu from Siliconera wrote that "while Let's School is a lot of fun and has a lot of cute ideas, its implementation can sometimes be rough", and added that its "charm doesn't last long before it becomes a monotonous routine". Jade Sayers from Push Square felt that the game "misses out on any humanity by treating the school purely as a business", turning an otherwise enjoyable game into "another cog in the machine, taking away any individuality and losing the benefit of having the setting in a school environment by treating school life as purely transactional". Trent Cannon from Nintendo Life described the game as a "deep, engaging – if a bit soulless – simulator".
