= Nintendo Switch 2 =

Hybrid video game console

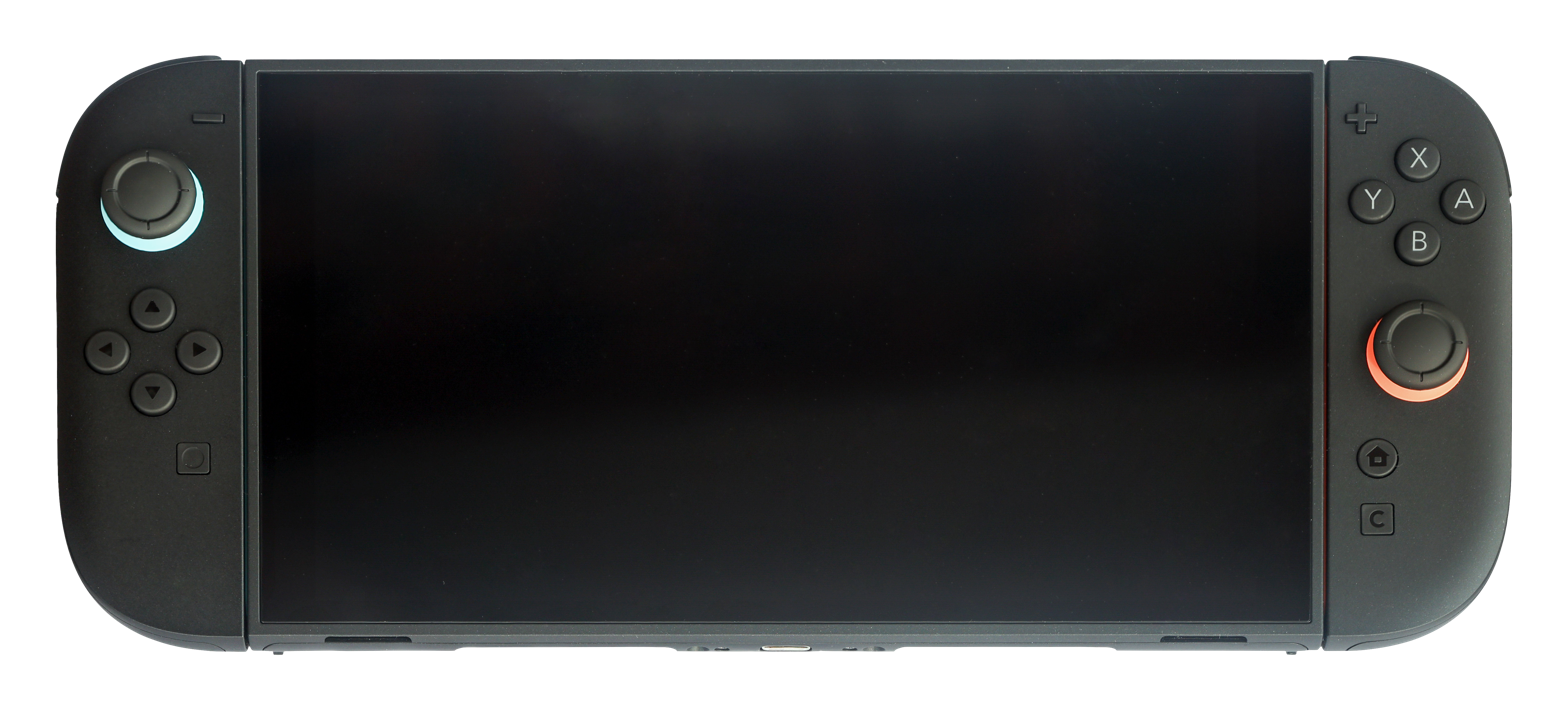
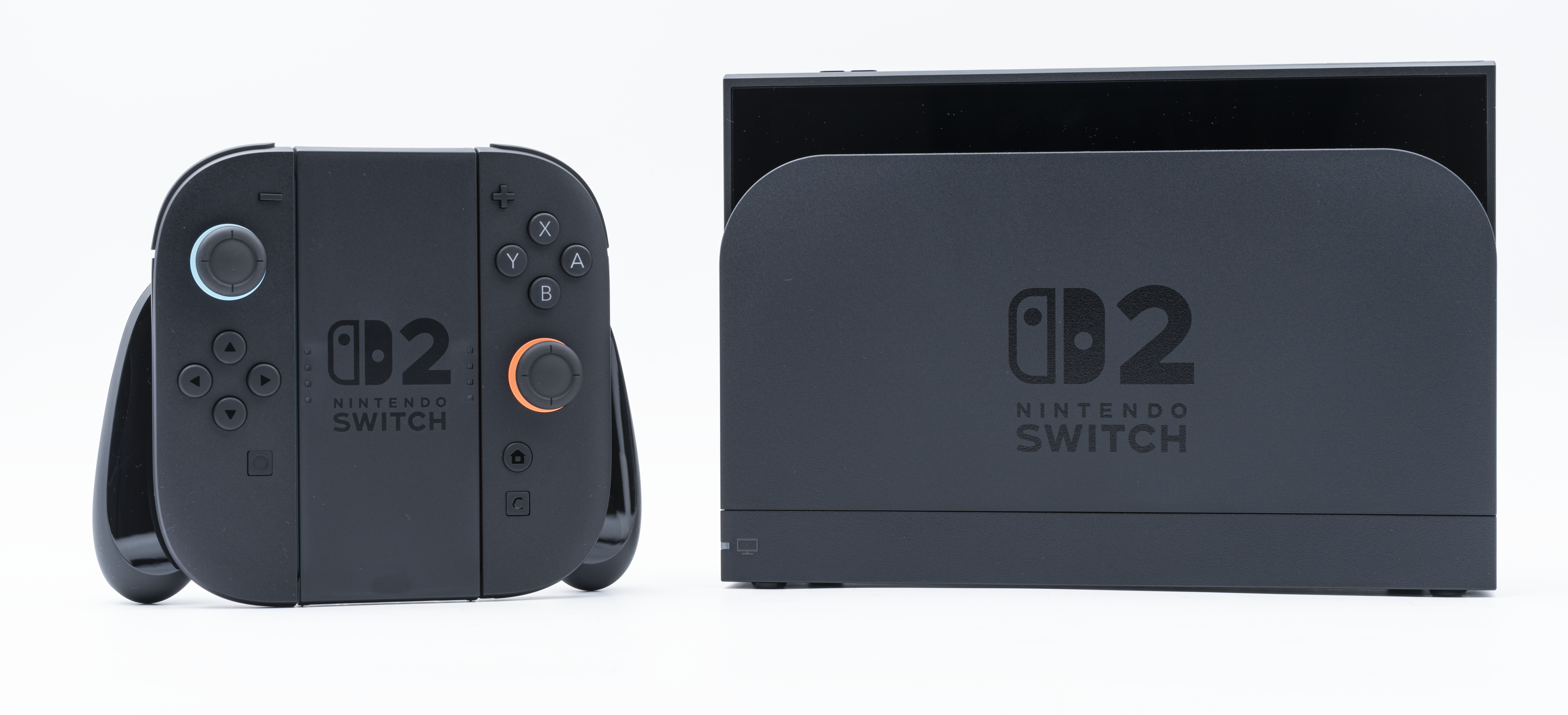
- Top: Console in "handheld mode" with Joy-Con 2 attached; Bottom: Console in "TV mode" with Joy-Con 2 attached to a grip and the main unit docked
- Codename: Ounce
- Developer: Nintendo TDD
- Manufacturer: Foxconn
- Type: Video game console
- Released: June 5, 2025: WW: June 5, 2025; PHL/SG/TH: June 26, 2025; MY: July 3, 2025; TW: July 10, 2025; UAE: September 17, 2025; ARG: October 10, 2025; IDN: December 10, 2026
- Introductory price: US$449.99 / A$699 / CA$629.99 / €469.99 / £395.99 / ¥49,980
- Units sold: 26.35 million as of September 30, 2026
- Media: Switch game card; Switch 2 game card; Digital distribution
- Operating system: Nintendo Switch system software
- System on a chip: Custom Nvidia Tegra T239 processor (codenamed "Drake")
- CPU: Octa-core ARM Cortex-A78C @ 998 MHz (docked); 1,101 MHz (undocked)
- Memory: 12 GB LPDDR5X 128-bit @ 6,400 MT/s (docked); 4,266 MT/s (undocked)
- Storage: 256 GB UFS 3.1
- Removable storage: microSD Express, up to 2 TB
- Display: 7.9-in LCD screen (279 ppi), 1080p up to 120 Hz with HDR10 and VRR; Docked: 720p/1080p/1440p up to 120 Hz, 4K at 60 Hz via HDMI with HDR10 and VRR
- Graphics: 1,536 Ampere-based CUDA cores; Docked: 1,007 MHz, 3.072 TFLOPS; Undocked: 561 MHz, 1.71 TFLOPS
- Sound: Undocked: Linear PCM 2.0 ch stereo speakers, 3D audio effects; Docked: Linear PCM 5.1 ch, 3D audio effects
- Input: Joy-Con 2; Nintendo Switch 2 Pro Controller; Multi-touch touchscreen; Microphone with noise-cancelling technology; Nintendo Switch 2 Camera
- Connectivity: Wi-Fi 6; Bluetooth; Headphone jack; 2 × USB-C; Dock: 2 × USB 2.0; 1 × Gigabit Ethernet; 1 × HDMI 2.1
- Power: 3.78 V 19.74 Wh 5,220 mAh Li-ion battery; Duration: 2–6.5 hours
- Current firmware: 23.5.0 (November 9, 2026; 8 days ago) [±]
- Online services: Nintendo eShop; Nintendo Switch Online
- Dimensions: 272 × 116 × 13.9 mm (10.71 × 4.57 × 0.55 in) with Joy-Con 2 attached
- Weight: 534 g (18.8 oz)
- Best-selling game: Mario Kart World (15.39 million, as of June 30, 2026) (list)
- Backward compatibility: Nintendo Switch (Note: According to Nintendo, certain Nintendo Switch games may not be supported or fully compatible.)
- Predecessor: Nintendo Switch
- Website: nintendo.com/gaming-systems/switch-2/

The Nintendo Switch 2 (Note: Japanese: ニンテンドースイッチ2, Hepburn: Nintendō Suitchi Tsū; Nintendo branded the console in Japan in its English name.) is a video game console developed by Nintendo and released in most regions on June 5, 2025. Like the preceding Nintendo Switch, it can be used as a handheld, as a tablet, or connected via the dock to an external display. The Joy-Con 2 controllers can be used while magnetically attached or detached from the console, are larger than the previous Joy-Con controllers, and include computer mouse functionality. Compared to the original Switch, the Switch 2 has a larger liquid-crystal display (LCD), more internal storage, updated graphics, and social features. It supports 1080p resolution (Full HD) and a 120 Hz refresh rate in handheld or tabletop mode, and 4K resolution with a 60 Hz refresh rate when docked, as well as HDR support on both the tablet and compatible external displays.

Games are available through physical game cards and Nintendo's digital eShop. Some game "key" cards contain no game content and require players to download the game via an internet connection. Select Switch games can use the improved Switch 2 performance through either free or paid updates. The Switch 2 retains the Nintendo Switch Online subscription service, which is required for some multiplayer games and provides access to the Nintendo Classics library of older emulated games; GameCube games are exclusive to the Switch 2. The GameChat feature allows players to chat remotely and share screens and webcams.

Nintendo revealed the Switch 2 on January 16, 2025 after long-lasting rumors, and announced its full specifications and release details on April 2. Pre-orders in most regions began on April 5. The system received praise for its social and technical improvements over its predecessor, though the increased prices of both the console and its games library were criticized. More than 3.5 million units were sold worldwide within four days of release, making the Switch 2 the fastest-selling Nintendo console. As of June 2026, the Switch 2 has sold over 23 million units worldwide. Mario Kart World, available as a bundled inclusion at launch, is its best-selling game with over 15 million copies sold.

== History ==
=== Background ===
Nintendo released the original Switch in March 2017, which was developed in the wake of the commercial failure of the Wii U. The Switch was promoted as a hybrid console with handheld, tabletop, and docked configurations, with Joy-Con controllers that can be separated from the main unit for the handheld or tabletop configurations. Compared to the other major consoles on the market at the time – the PlayStation 4 and Xbox One – the Switch had less-powerful computational hardware to keep the unit's price low, but sufficient to power the type of games Nintendo typically publishes; part of the company's long-term Blue Ocean Strategy to differentiate itself from the other console manufacturers. By December 2025, the Switch became Nintendo's best-selling console and the second best-selling gaming console overall, following the PlayStation 2. At the time of the Switch 2's announcement in January 2025, over 146 million Switch units had been sold worldwide.

=== Development ===
Nintendo began pre-production of its next console shortly after the Switch's release, with a team reviewing the performance limitations of the Switch and identifying what hardware changes could be made to address them. This also provided enough time to plan out the hardware so as to be able to ship software development kits (SDKs) to game development partners. Formal development of the Switch 2 (codenamed "Ounce") started in 2019, led by producer Kouichi Kawamoto, hardware director Takuhiro Dohta, and technical director Tetsuya Sasaki. Though past Nintendo consoles have generally featured a new type of hardware experience, such as the hybrid nature of the original Switch, the Switch 2 development team found that developers had adapted to writing their games toward the hybrid format and decided it would not be helpful to introduce any significant hardware changes, instead choosing to focus on computation performance improvements to give developers better tools with which to work with. Hardware components were selected to balance performance and battery life along with expanding the memory to support newer games.

Nintendo president Shuntaro Furukawa said the company sought to make the transition to its successor smooth for consumers, and backward compatibility was a key part of the design; Nintendo said, "Nintendo Switch is played by many consumers, and we decided that the best direction to take would be for consumers to be able to play their already purchased Nintendo Switch software on the successor to Nintendo Switch". As Nintendo prioritized improving the hardware, backward compatibility was more complex to implement than it had been for consoles such as Nintendo 3DS or Wii U, which have similar hardware to their predecessors. The Switch 2 uses a hybrid of software and hardware emulation to avoid a more taxing software-only solution. The name was partially influenced by the backward compatibility. Nintendo also considered "Super Nintendo Switch", similar to the Super Nintendo Entertainment System following the Nintendo Entertainment System, but decided this would diminish the compatibility feature. The new Joy-Con controllers were redesigned from the ground up. With the larger screen on the console, simply scaling the older Joy-Con to match size was not sufficient as their longer size would make it more difficult to hold and trigger the shoulder buttons. As such, Nintendo included more rounding-off of the corners and extended the shoulder buttons further towards the side of the controller. The HD Rumble feature was improved and surpassed the limits of the original Joy-Con, heightening its intensity to levels that are comparable to the controllers on the GameCube.

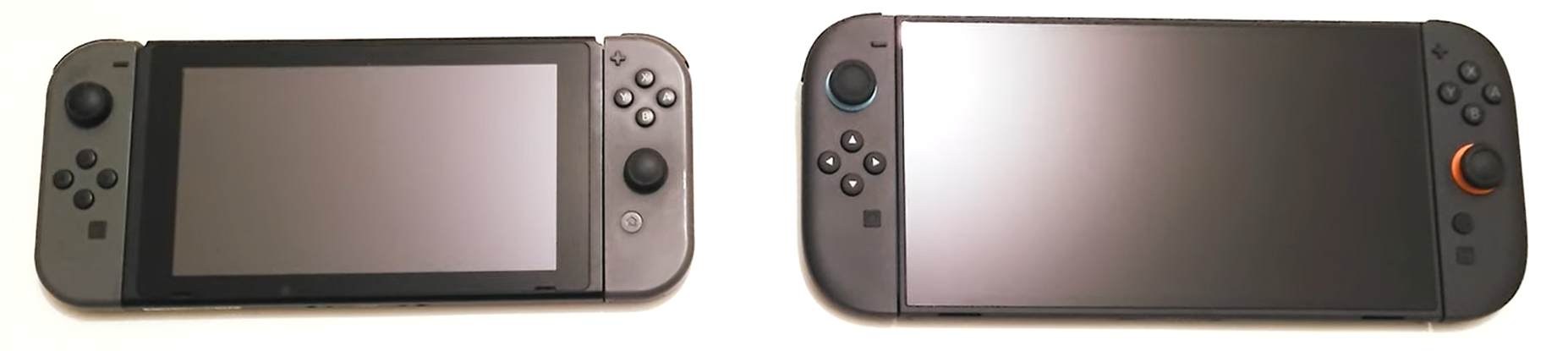
The Nintendo Switch 2 (right) features a larger screen and larger Joy-Con controllers compared to the original Nintendo Switch (left).

Rather than the rail system used on the original Switch, the new Joy-Con are connected using magnetic connections. Nintendo had originally explored magnetic connections for the first Switch model but the connection was determined to be too wobbly. With the Joy-Con 2, they refined the magnetic approach, making the connection stronger and easily removed with a mechanical release system. With this new system, the Joy-Con now audibly snap when the magnetic connection is made, which Dohta said helped to symbolize the Switch branding.

The capability of the Joy-Con to be used as computer mice was an idea introduced by Kawamoto who also played games on personal computers, as mouse control would not only allow the Joy-Con to help replace the screen's touch controls when the console is docked, but also could be used to introduce new forms of gameplay. Kawamoto said this idea represented Gunpei Yokoi's concept of "lateral thinking of withered technology" that has been part of Nintendo's approach for several decades. The Pro Controller was also similarly redesigned for the Switch 2, smoothing out the motions of the joysticks, and adding an audio jack and two programmable buttons in the grips that the player can customize.

The GameChat feature, which allows players to chat, and to share screens and webcams, is a result of Nintendo developers' own frustration with existing tools they had to use in game development during the 2020 COVID-19 pandemic shutdowns. Because standard software limited them to one shared screen, they pointed webcams at monitors for constant, simultaneous visibility. Kawamoto said that it felt "like we were all in the same place, each bringing our own console to play the game together, which was a lot of fun", leading to the development of the GameChat feature. The GameChat feature was developed to minimize the use of system resources that would take away from game performance, and some functionality is based on the same streaming service Wii U Chat that was developed for the Wii U and Wii U GamePad.

=== Industry rumors ===
Industry rumors began as early as 2019 of a high-end model of the Switch, often nicknamed the "Nintendo Switch Pro" in the media; many of the speculated features became part of the OLED Switch model, released in 2021. Nintendo confirmed it was working on its next gaming system during a call with investors in October 2020. Digital Foundry said that Nintendo may have been working on a "pro" model for the Switch, but by December 2022, it appeared to have fully transitioned all development towards the Nintendo Switch successor. Court reports from the 2023 FTC v. Microsoft case, which challenged Microsoft's acquisition of Activision Blizzard, included reference to Activision being briefed on the "Switch NG" in December 2022.

Video Games Chronicle reported in July 2023 that Nintendo had sent out SDKs for its next console to development partners and that Nintendo wanted to avoid the shortages that the ninth generation consoles, the PlayStation 5 and Xbox Series X/S, had suffered at launch. Nintendo showcased the Switch 2 in a private presentation during Gamescom in August; among the tech demos were a version of the Switch game The Legend of Zelda: Breath of the Wild (2017), running at a higher frame rate and resolution, and the Unreal Engine 5 demo The Matrix Awakens (2021).

While Nintendo officially acknowledged the development of the Switch's successor by May 2024, rumors and leaked photos of a new console persisted through 2024, as well as a data breach from Game Freak on the development of the next Pokémon game for the Switch's successor.

At the 2025 Consumer Electronics Show (CES) in early January, several third-party vendors showcased accessories scheduled for the Switch successor, leading Nintendo to issue a statement that none of the mock-ups used at the show were official. Nintendo filed a lawsuit against video game accessory company Genki in May 2025 for using detailed renders and a 3D printed model of the Switch 2 in their CES presentation; Genki settled with Nintendo in September 2025, paying an undisclosed sum and agreeing to avoid similar marketing approaches in the future.

=== Announcement and promotion ===
The Switch 2 was initially expected to launch in late 2024. In February 2024, Bloomberg News and The Nikkei both reported that Nintendo had informed publishers it was delaying the release into early 2025 to prevent console shortages and scalping. Bloomberg reported after the console's launch that the delay was also due in part to the console designers requesting more time to perfect the games that were to be released alongside the console at launch. Nintendo's shares fell by nearly six percent following the reported delay.

Nintendo revealed the Switch 2 on January 16, 2025, introducing its new design and magnetic Joy-Con controllers, and brief footage of a new Mario Kart game, which was later announced as Mario Kart World. A one-hour Nintendo Direct presentation about the Switch 2 premiered on April 2, with Nintendo Treehouse presentations on Switch 2 games airing in the following 2 days. Nintendo hosted a series of worldwide events from April through June to allow players to try the console before release. Furukawa said Nintendo was making preparations for the Switch 2's release to prevent excessive sales to resellers and scalpers, which had been a problem with previous Nintendo hardware releases.

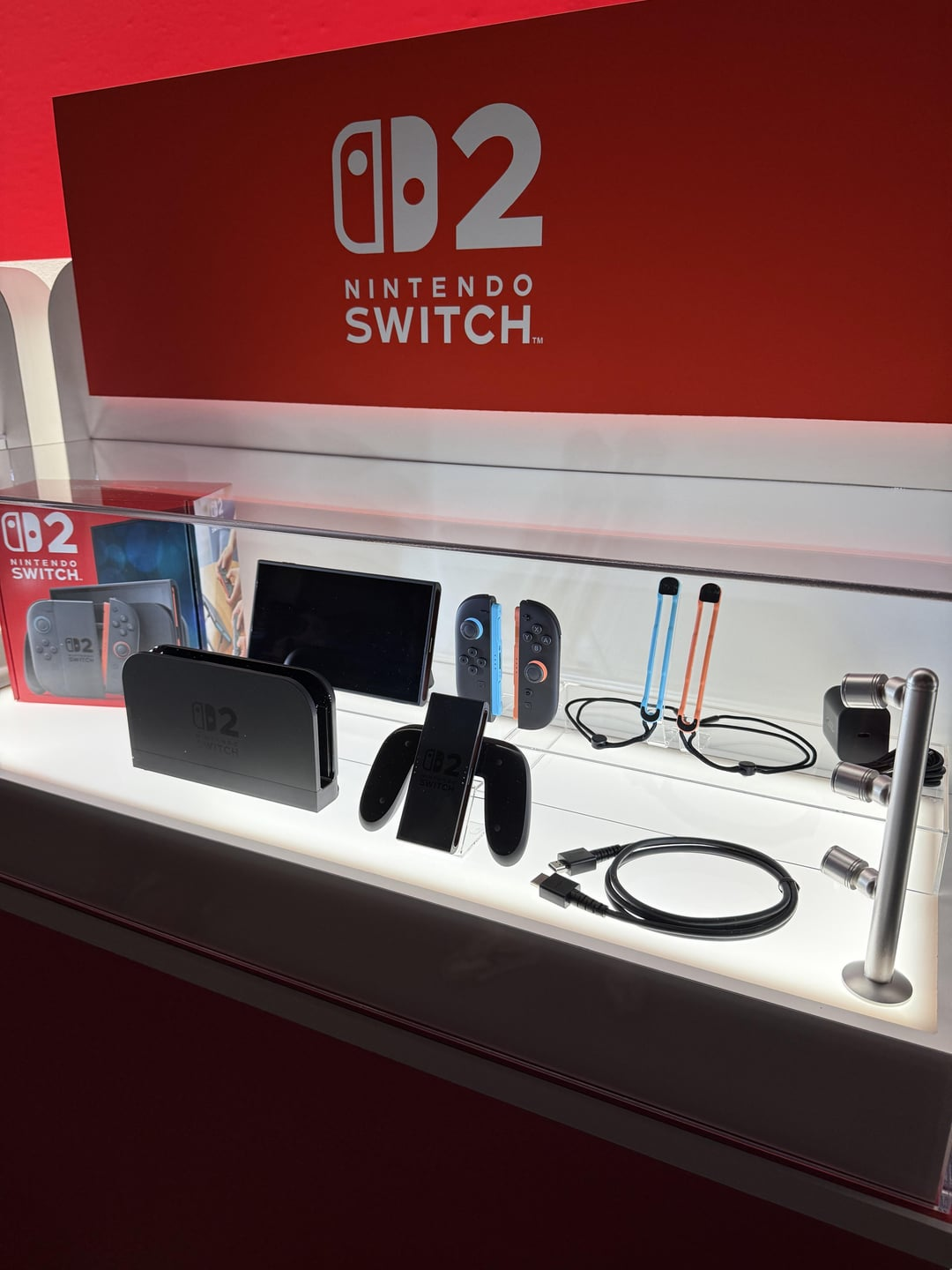
A promotional display of the Switch 2 in April 2025

As part of the promotion for the Switch 2, Nintendo of America partnered with Major League Baseball and the Seattle Mariners to have the Nintendo and Switch 2 logos be featured on the Mariners' team jerseys for the 2025 season. In April 2025, Nintendo of America released a commercial for the console starring actor Paul Rudd, directly referencing a commercial promoting the SNES that he also starred in 34 years prior. During the March 2025 installment of Nintendo Direct, Nintendo simultaneously announced and launched the Nintendo Today! application for iOS and Android devices, intended to act as the primary news and calendar hub for delivering information on various Nintendo platforms, including daily updates related to Nintendo Switch 2 hardware, software, services and forthcoming events following the Switch 2-focused Nintendo Direct.

==== Pre-orders ====
Months before the release, Nintendo stockpiled "hundreds of thousands" of units in the United States to avoid potential increased tariffs enacted by the Trump administration and reduce the likelihood of shortages. Nintendo also shifted production and sourcing of parts away from China and towards Southeast Asia, especially Vietnam, to avoid tariffs levied specifically against China.

To avoid reselling issues in Japan, a region-locked Switch 2 is being sold at retail in the country at a reduced cost, with a region-free version to be released via Nintendo's online store only. In other regions, while pre-orders have been made available through retailers, Nintendo established a pre-order waitlist to purchase directly from Nintendo, but requiring users to have a Nintendo Account and established playtime, among other requirements.

Pre-orders began in most regions on April 5, 2025. Shortly after the tariffs were announced on April 2, Nintendo delayed pre-orders in the US "to assess the potential impact of tariffs and evolving market conditions." A similar delay was also made for Canadian pre-orders as "to align with the timing of pre-orders to be determined in the US". Nintendo later affirmed that pre-orders for the console in the United States and Canada would start on April 24, 2025, with the console and console bundle with Mario Kart World remaining at the same price for launch, while some accessories saw an increase in price ranging from US$5 to $10.

Pre-orders for the US and Canada began on April 24 at midnight. Shortly after pre-orders went live, retailers Walmart, Target, and Best Buy reported widespread website errors and difficulties due to the overwhelming number of users attempting to reserve a pre-order, with console stock reportedly going out nationwide within minutes. Gaming retailer GameStop opened preorders later that day at 11 a.m. ET with glitches on the site being reported.

Nintendo cautioned Japanese consumers that over 2.2 million people had registered for the opportunity to pre-order the Japan-only console model through the company, far exceeding their expectations, and that they would not likely be able to meet all of these pre-orders by its launch date; those not selected would be automatically carried into similar programs for later shipments of the console. Stores in Japan used lotteries and similar mechanisms to handle the limited supply of consoles during its launch period. Nintendo issued a similar caution for those in the US pre-ordering through its store. Retailers began receiving shipments in late May 2025. Some who had pre-ordered Switch 2 consoles posted footage two weeks prior to the release, though they were unusable without a day-one patch.

=== Release and pricing ===
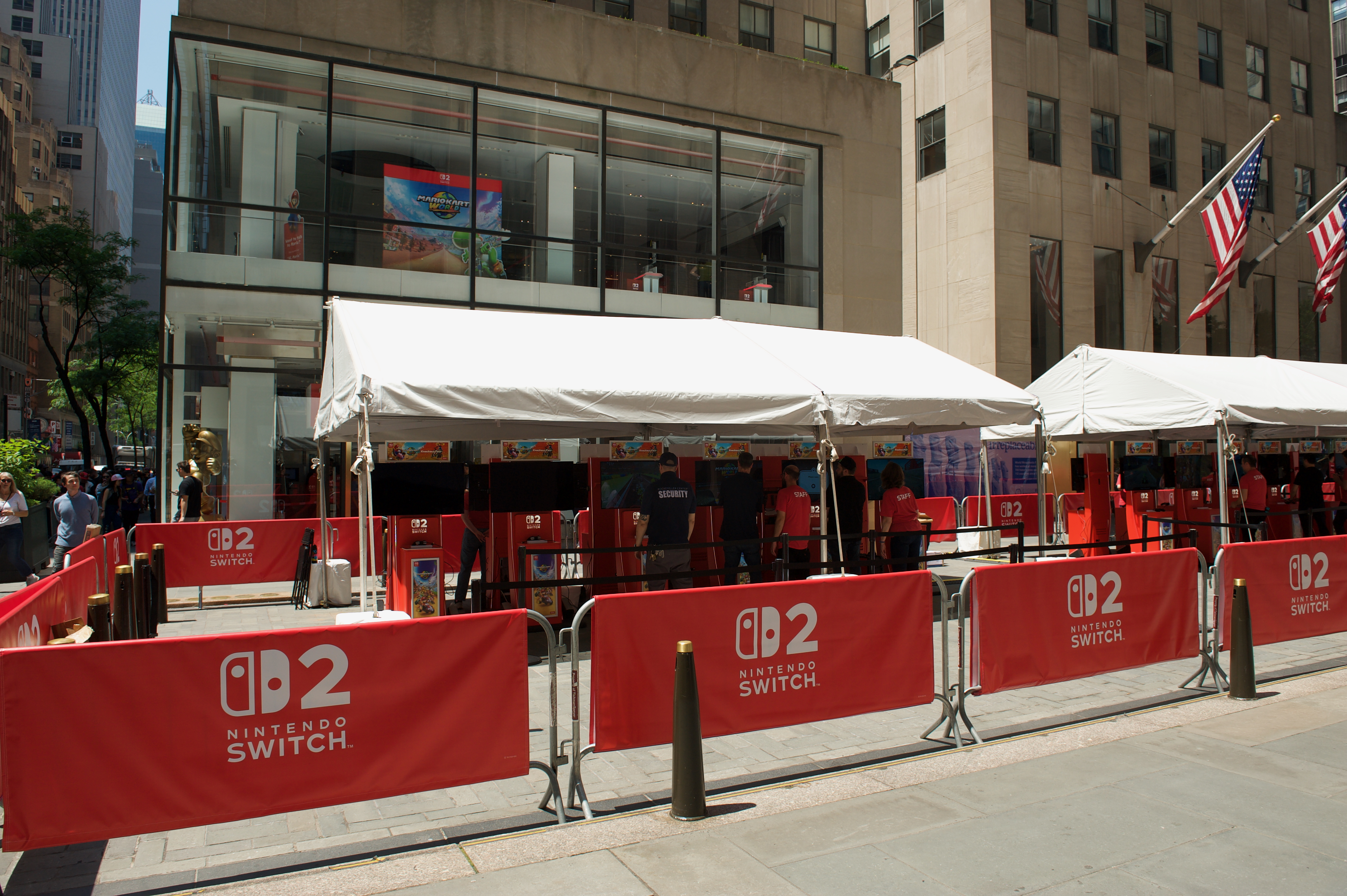
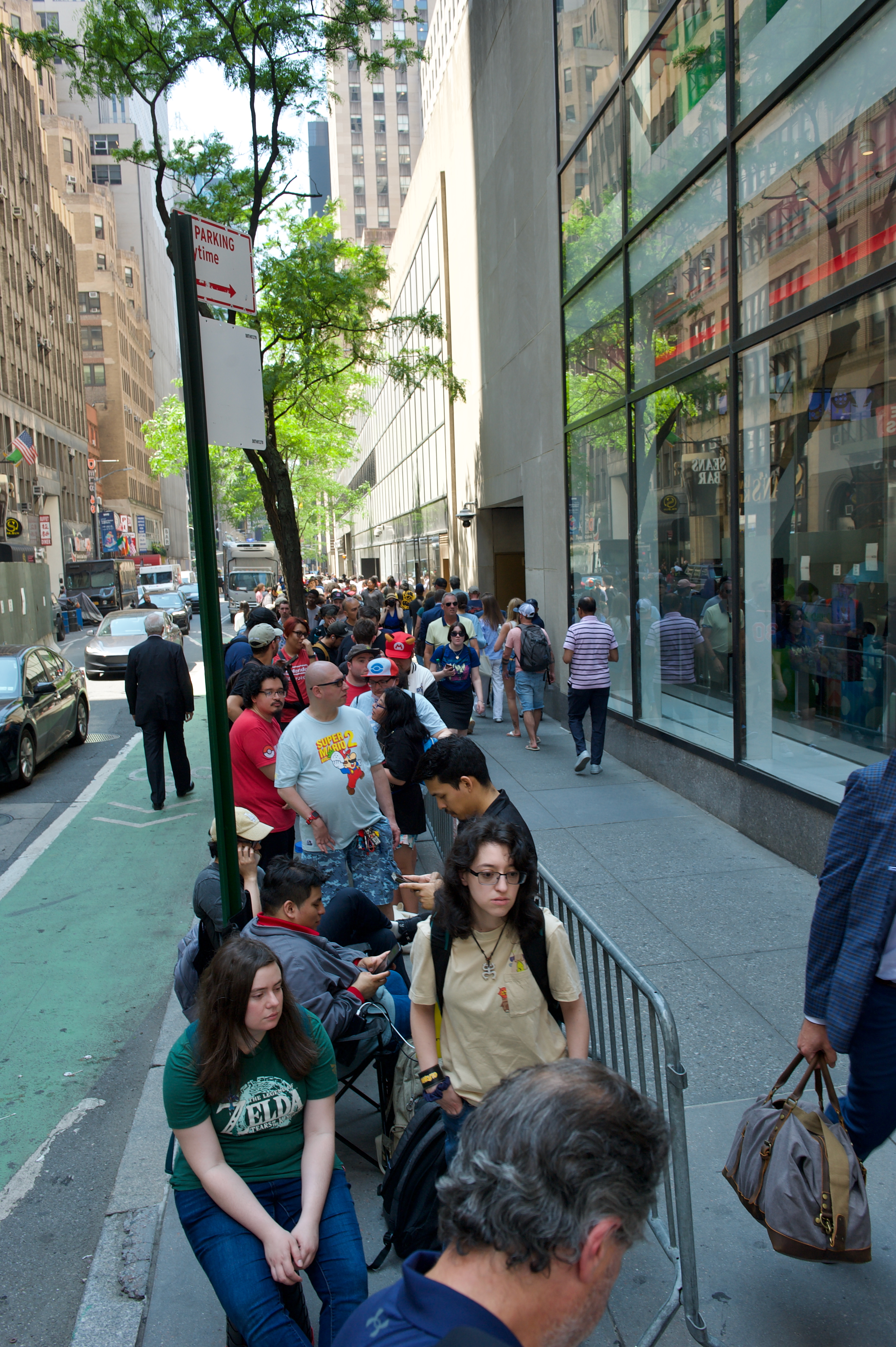
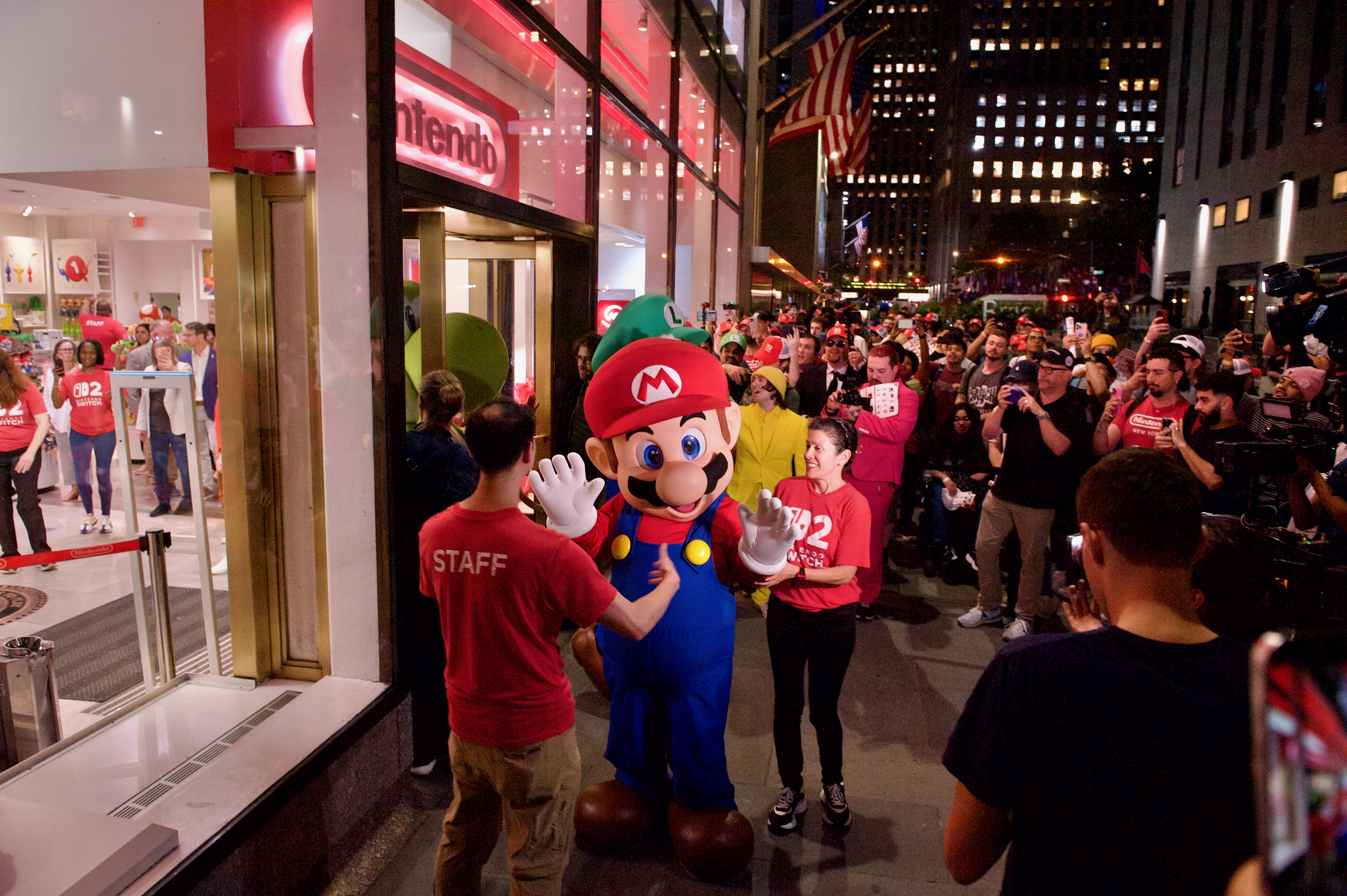
The launch event for the Nintendo Switch 2 at Nintendo New York

The Nintendo Switch 2 had a global release on June 5, 2025. This included Japan and North America, most European territories, Australia and New Zealand, Brazil, Chile, Colombia, Peru, South Africa, Hong Kong, Israel, Saudi Arabia, and South Korea. It was rolled out to other territories later that month, beginning with the Philippines, Singapore, and Thailand on June 26, followed by Malaysia on July 3, Taiwan on July 10, the United Arab Emirates on September 17, and Argentina on October 10. It is scheduled to release along with its predecessor in Indonesia on December 10, 2026. The Switch 2 release in China, originally scheduled with the global June 5 release, was delayed indefinitely.

The Switch 2 was launched at ¥69,980 in Japan, including sales taxes. In North America, the console was priced at US$449 in the United States and CA$629 in Canada. In Europe, the price was €469 in most of the eurozone and £395.99 in the United Kingdom (both of which including VAT). In Oceania, the console is priced at A$699 in Australia (including GST). In Japan, in addition to the regular, "international" model of the console, a second "Japan Only" version was offered for sale at the significantly lower price of ¥49,980. Unlike other Switch 2 models that can be used globally, this version operates only in the Japanese language and can only use online services registered to Japanese residents.

The launch price was higher than industry predictions. Prior to launch, analysts at Bloomberg L.P. had predicted that in the US, the Switch 2 would launch at a starting price of $400 or higher, pending the impact of tariffs on foreign goods imported into the US that took effect in February 2025, yet they affirmed that the console was projected to have a strong launch aided by exclusive software and backward compatibility with the Switch library. When the Switch 2's US price was revealed as US$449.99 – 50% higher than that of the original Switch at its launch – it was criticized as too high. Select Switch 2 games were announced to be retailing at US$80, which drew additional criticism. The price point makes the Switch 2 Nintendo's most expensive console in over 30 years when adjusted for inflation.

Nintendo of America president Doug Bowser stated that the US price of the Switch 2 was not based on tariffs imposed by the Trump administration on April 2, 2025, as several publications had suggested; but instead simply due to the unit being a premium console alongside the three Switch consoles it will continue to sell. Bowser stated that shipments of the Switch 2 had already been stockpiling globally for release by this point, and thus was unlikely to affect the release date of the Switch 2.

Though priced relatively high in the US, other analysts have ruled out US-imposed tariffs as the major factor in the high price of the Switch 2, citing the already rising prices of video game consoles and the fact that Canada and countries in Europe also have similar price points (although, when compared on a pre-tax basis, European pricing is actually lower). Writing in Aftermath, games journalist Luke Plunkett opined that the inflation surge following the COVID-19 pandemic and the subsequent cost-of-living crisis was likely to impact the console's sales. Some fans campaigned for Nintendo to lower the price of the Switch 2 and its games via social media platforms and in the audience text chats during Nintendo's live streams. Former Nintendo public relations managers Kit Ellis and Krysta Yang criticized the company for omitting pricing details from the reveal stream, feeling that it created confusion as consumers had to search for that information elsewhere, thus exacerbating the negative response.

In one case, a GameStop store in Staten Island, New York, had stapled pre-order receipts to the Switch 2 box for release day customers, but due to the way the console was packed near the front of the box, the staples were able to puncture the screens. GameStop immediately replaced affected units, and later held an auction for the stapler and one of the affected consoles, since repaired, to raise money for the Children's Miracle Network Hospitals.

Following the onset of worldwide tariffs by the Trump administration on August 1, 2025, Nintendo announced a price increase for the original Switch consoles and some Switch 2 accessories that took effect on August 3, 2025, in the United States. Nintendo cautioned that price adjustments for the Switch 2, games, and Nintendo Switch Online subscriptions "may be necessary in the future". On March 25, 2026, Nintendo announced that first-party digital and physical Switch 2 games would be priced differently, starting with Yoshi and the Mysterious Book in May.

On May 9, 2026, Nintendo announced a price increase for the Switch 2 hardware as a result of the ongoing global memory shortage, among other factors. The console started at ¥59,980 in Japan effective May 25, 2026, and at $499.99 USD/$679.99 CAD/€499.99 in other territories effective September 1, 2026. Furukawa said in November 2026 that they do not expect another price adjustment for the console, as they are in a position to purchase memory chips at volume.

=== Litigation ===
On March 6, 2026, Nintendo filed a lawsuit against the U.S government over tariffs imposed on the Switch 2 console, which led to delayed pre-orders and increased prices on its hardware and accessories.

== Hardware ==
Like its predecessor, the Switch 2 is a hybrid console, which can be used as both a handheld console or placed into a dock connected to a television or monitor to be played like a home console. The unit maintains a similar form factor as the Switch, and consists of the main body that includes the screen and primary hardware, and two Joy-Con 2 controllers that can be attached to the main unit's sides in handheld mode, or can communicate wirelessly to the main unit when docked.

=== Console ===
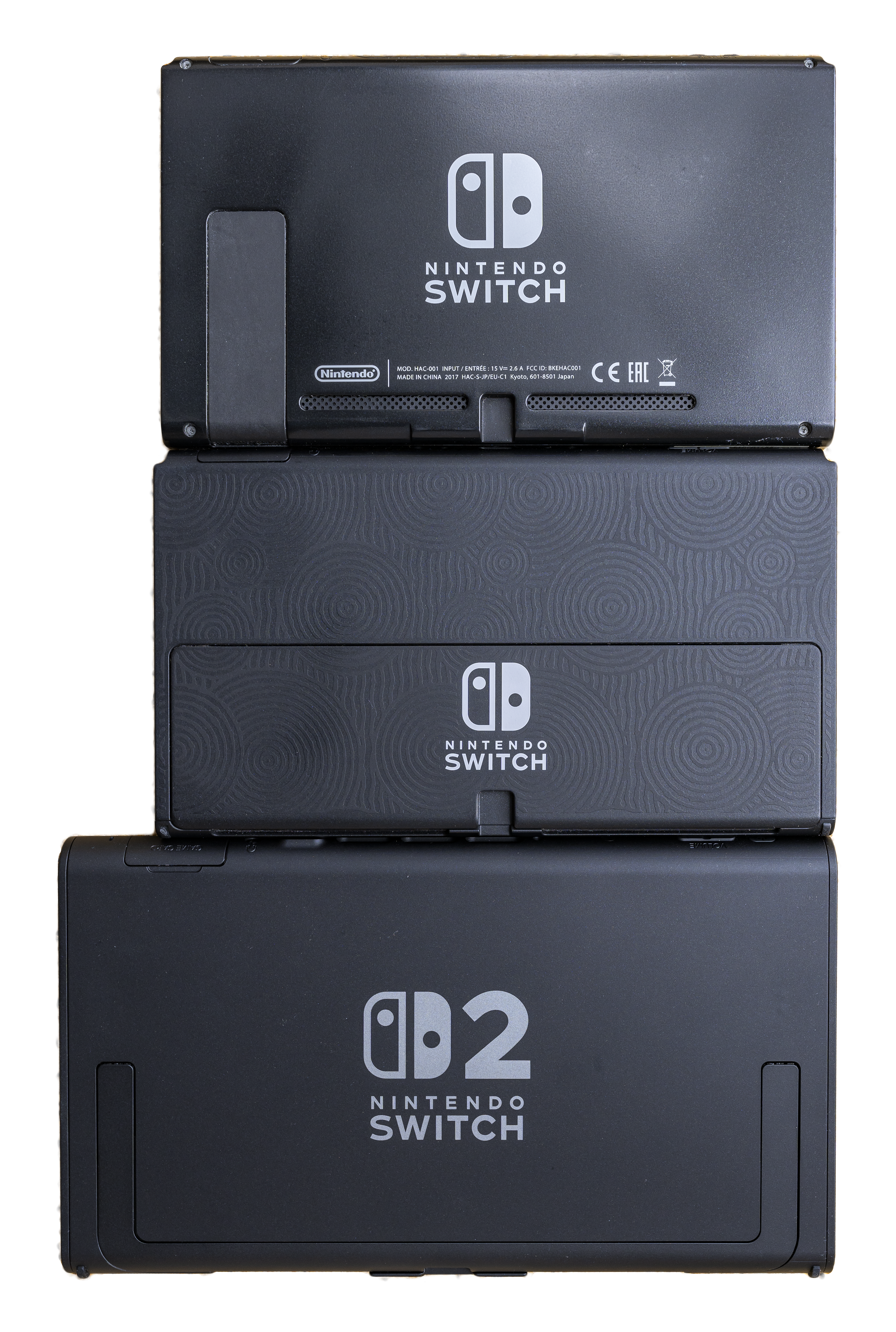
Comparison between the original Nintendo Switch, the OLED model, and the Nintendo Switch 2, all facing down

Along with the existing layouts from the Nintendo Switch's design, which includes a USB-C port on the bottom that serves as its power source and connector within a dock, a headphone jack, and a cartridge slot, the Nintendo Switch 2 adds an internal microphone with noise cancellation and a second USB-C port on the top of the unit for charging the console when on tabletop mode, and for use with accessories like external cameras. The console also has a redesigned stand with adjustable angle, similar to that used on the Switch OLED model. With the Joy-Con 2 controllers attached, the console measures 272 mm (10.71 in) in width, 116 mm (4.57 in) in height, and 13.9 mm (0.55 in) in depth, and weighs 534 g (18.8 oz).

The Switch 2 uses a 7.9 in (20 cm) LCD touchscreen with 1080p resolution (279 ppi) and HDR, which supports a variable refresh rate of up to 120 Hz. When docked, the console can output up to 1440p at 120 Hz or 4K resolution at 60 Hz with HDR and VRR. The original Switch included an OLED revision, and while Nintendo had considered using OLED for the Switch 2, hardware design lead Tetsuya Sasaki said they opted to use LCD due to the advancements in LCD technology including support for HDR. Unlike the first-generation model, the dock also contains a built-in Ethernet connector and a cooling fan. The cooling fan is only intended to cool the dock itself, not the Switch 2 console.

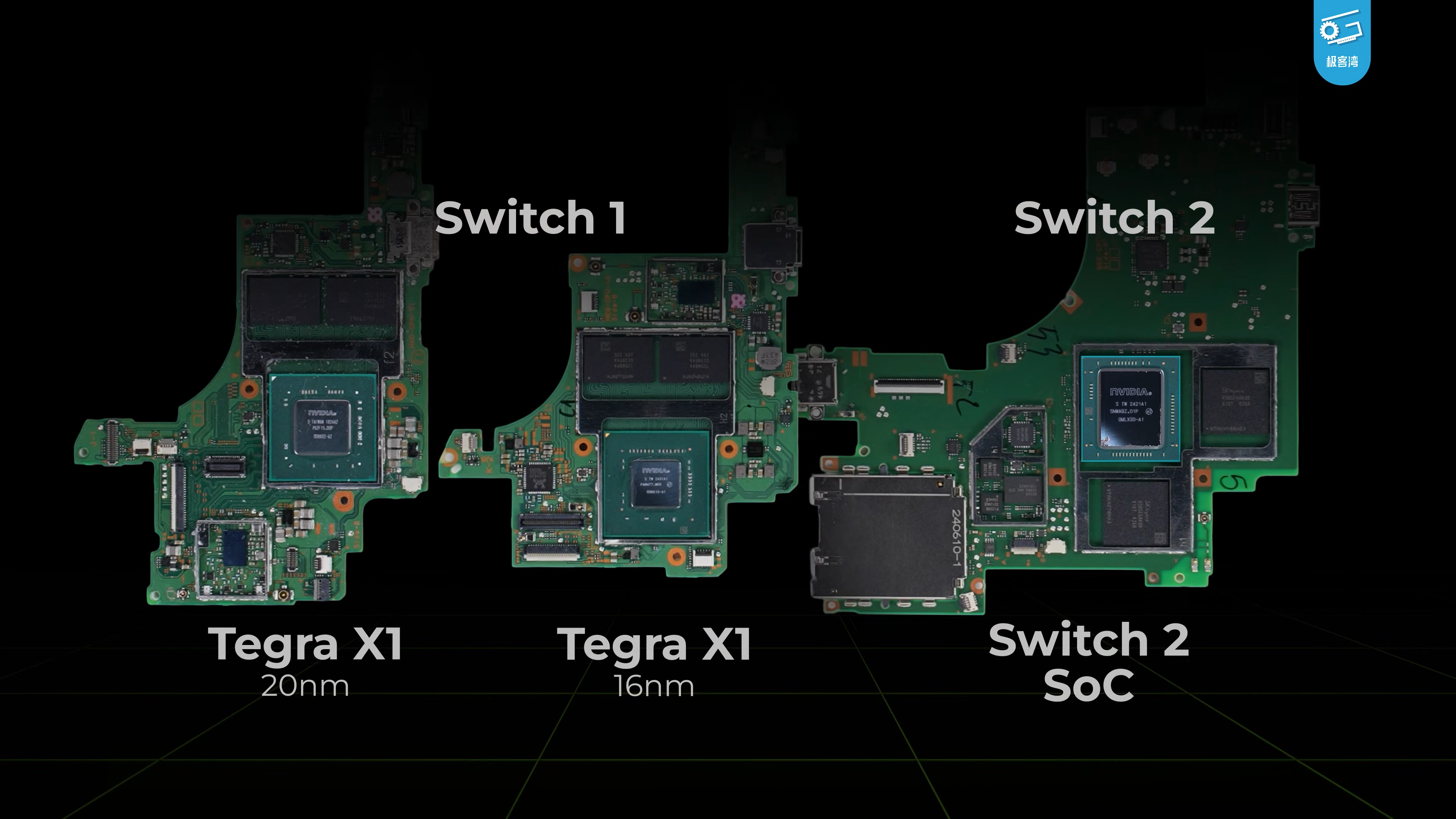
Comparison of mainboard between Switch models and Switch 2; newer Nvidia SoC shown in right

The system on a chip, the Nvidia-developed Tegra T239 (codenamed "Drake"), features an octa-core ARM Cortex-A78C CPU, a 12 SM Ampere GPU (with 1,536 Ampere-based CUDA cores), and a 128-bit LPDDR5X memory interface. 12 GB of this memory is present over two 6 GB chips and provides around 102 GB/s (docked) or 68 GB/s (handheld) of bandwidth. The Switch 2 supports Nvidia's Deep Learning Super Sampling (DLSS) technology via Tensor cores and hardware-enabled ray tracing via RT cores, and supports variable refresh rate through Nvidia G-Sync in handheld mode. It supports Wi-Fi 6.

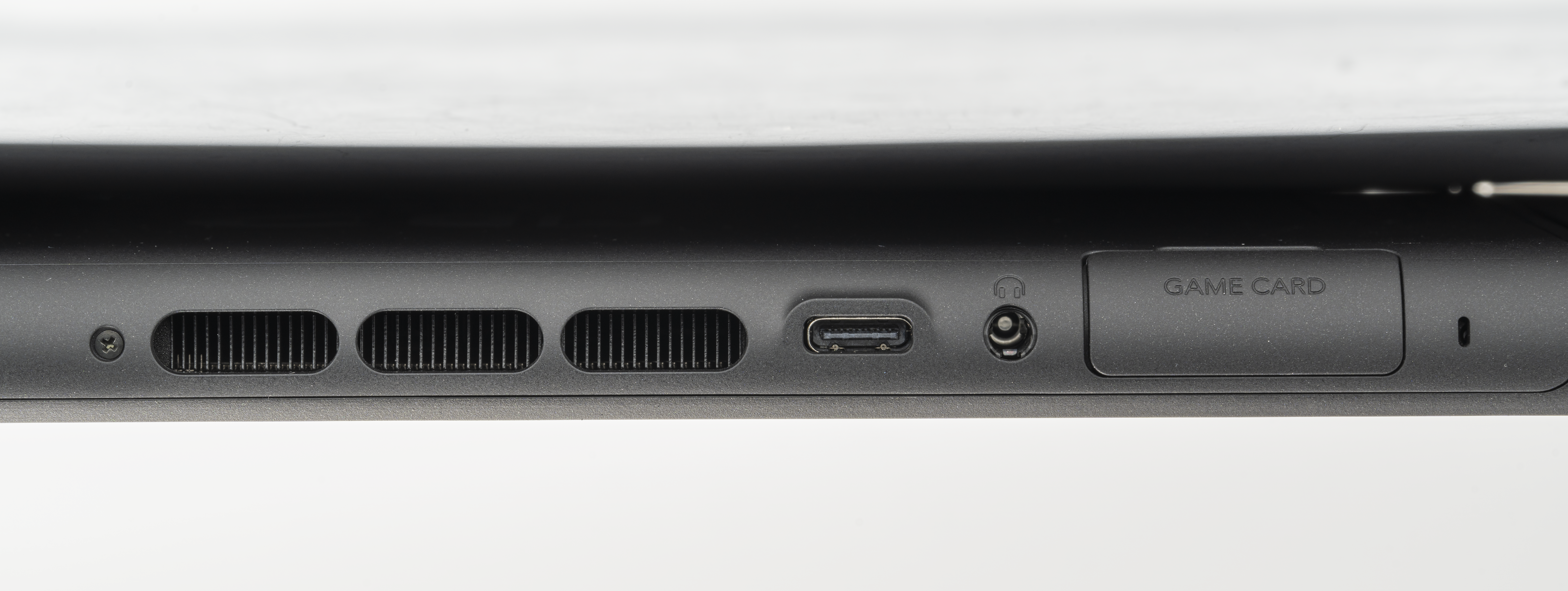
The top of the console, showing the exhaust vents, USB-C port, headphone jack, game card slot, and microphone

The Switch 2 includes 256 GB of internal storage, a significant increase from the 32 GB of the first-generation Switch. Storage can be expanded using microSD Express cards of up to 2 TB, allowing higher read and write speeds than the microSDHC and microSDXC cards used in the first-generation model. The Switch 2 only supports loading games from microSD Express cards; though it still supports accessing microSDHC and microSDXC cards, they can only be used for viewing screenshots and videos.

The Switch 2 is primarily powered in handheld mode by an internal, non-removable 5,220 mAh Lithium-ion rechargeable battery. Nintendo estimates the battery life to be between approximately 2 and 6.5 hours, though noting that these are rough estimates and the actual duration depends on the specific software being used. The battery can be charged via either of the console's USB-C ports as well as the dock. The estimated recharge time is approximately 3 hours when the system is in sleep mode.

In January 2025, alleged images of the system's motherboard appeared. Richard Leadbetter of Digital Foundry concluded that, rather than porting the Ampere-based architecture to a smaller process node, it is more likely that the existing low-cost Samsung 8 nm process node is being used. While such a process poses difficulties for performance and battery life, Leadbetter believed these can be relieved due to the nature of fixed hardware platforms, which allow for custom software optimizations to be implemented. In June 2025, Nvidia CEO Jensen Huang claimed the processor's semiconductor process technology employs optimizations for "ultra low power".

==== Hardware protections ====
Numerous outlets have reported that the Switch 2's dock communicates using a non-standard proprietary protocol rendering existing third-party docks incompatible, as those intended for the original Switch or USB-C DisplayPort Alt mode are unable to communicate with the console. This incompatibility was attributed to the Switch 2 console requiring a 20-volt power supply to enter docked mode. In the months following release, third-party docks compatible with the Switch 2 became available. A system software patch for the Switch 2 released in November 2025 appeared to eliminate the video output signal from the console to some third-party docks, rendering them unusable. Nintendo asserted that with the patch, the company "does not have any intention to hinder or invalidate legal third-party dock compatibility".

In May 2025, Nintendo announced an update to the North American Nintendo Account user agreement and privacy policy which, if broken by users of the Switch 2, could "render the Nintendo Account Services and/or [sic] the applicable Nintendo device permanently unusable in whole or in part". This was expected to be in an attempt to stop piracy and emulation of games. The agreement also pertains to installing unauthorized software or modifying the hardware to make it run faster. As a result of this policy, players that have used third-party flashcarts in the Switch 2 to sideload Switch games, or who have purchased game cards second-hand, have found their consoles banned from the Nintendo Switch Online service. According to Engadget, this is a result of Nintendo taking steps to block systems that appear to be using duplicated cards by attaching unique ID codes to every Switch and Switch 2 game card. In at least one case, a user had legitimately bought used game cards, and after their Switch 2 was blocked, had been able to demonstrate proof of purchase to Nintendo who had removed the block. In other cases, these bans appear to be permanent, preventing the system from connecting to Nintendo's network. Some second-hand buyers of the Switch 2 found that these bans prevented them from registering the system to their own accounts due to the devices being rendered unable to connect to Nintendo's network before their acquisition. This has led Brazil's Consumer Protection and Defence Program, a consumer-rights group, to file a legal complaint against Nintendo, alleging this type of action violates consumer laws in their country.

=== Joy-Con 2 ===
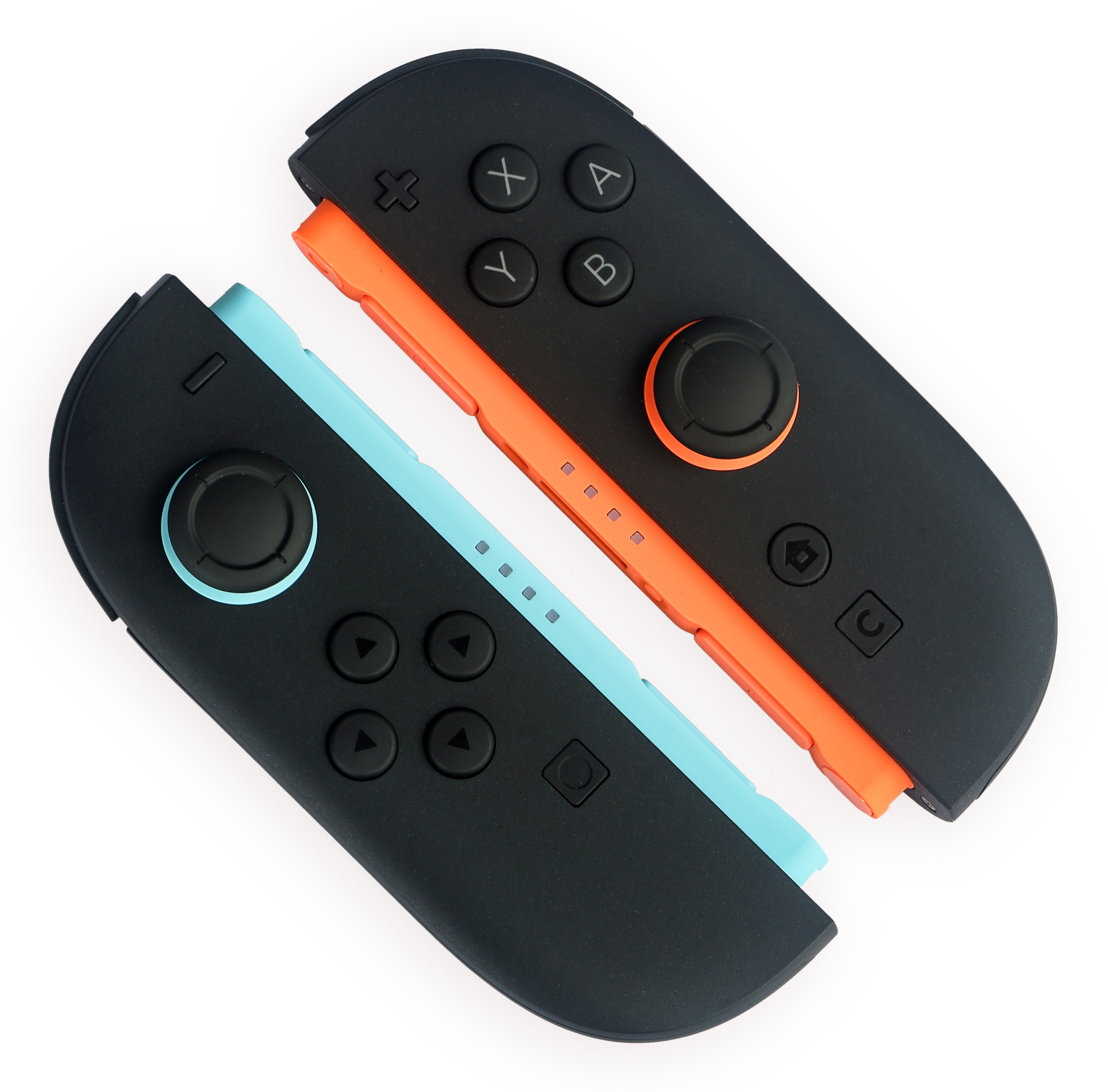
The Joy-Con 2 controllers

The Joy-Con 2 controllers have an updated design from the original Joy-Con. Besides being larger to match the console, they attach magnetically by snapping to the sides rather than using a rail system. They are removed using a small button on the Joy-Con 2 that causes a cylinder inside to extend and push off from the main unit. Nintendo stated that their analog sticks would be larger, smoother, and more durable. Early reports suggested the new controller thumbsticks would use Hall-effect sensors to address the drift issues that the original models had due to dust collecting within the analog system but Nintendo stated in April 2025 that Hall-effect sensors are not used.

The SL and SR buttons on the side of the controllers have been significantly enlarged, and a new C button is present on the right Joy-Con 2 to activate the new GameChat feature. The controllers are also able to be used like a computer mouse in supported games by sliding them across a surface. Both Joy-Con 2 controllers have a 500mAh battery that is estimated to last 20 hours. The controllers can be recharged by connecting them to the console or by using the Charging Grip. The infrared sensor from the first-generation Joy-Con has been removed.

=== Nintendo Switch 2 Camera ===
The Nintendo Switch 2 Camera is a USB-C webcam developed by Nintendo and made specifically for the Nintendo Switch 2. The camera can be used for GameChat and CameraPlay, in-game camera features. The camera has an aluminium body with a rubber grip at its base. The camera includes a 110 degree wide lens with a 1080p image sensor. It also comes with a cover for privacy.

While Nintendo allows third party USB-C cameras to function with the Switch 2, they note that not all work with the console. There is an option in system settings to test functionality of a connected USB-C camera. According to Niles Mitchell on YouTube, an iPhone is compatible as a camera.

=== Revisions ===
In March 2026, Nikkei reported that Nintendo was developing a European-exclusive revision of the Switch 2 which includes user-replaceable batteries for the console and the Joy-Con 2. This was to comply with the European Union's right to repair regulations, which require easy replacement for rechargeable batteries. Nintendo confirmed that it would start shipping these models across Europe in July 2026, with all countries in that continent receiving these by early 2027; at the same time the company announced it was discontinuing the original Switch family in Europe by February 2027.

== Software ==
The Nintendo Switch 2 HOME Menu

=== Distribution ===
As with its predecessor, games for Switch 2 can be obtained in physical and digital formats, with physically distributed games being stored on proprietary Game Cards that share a similar form factor with those used on the first-generation Switch. Game Cards for Switch 2 games are colored in red to differentiate them from those released for the first-generation Switch, which are grey. Like Switch game cards, Switch 2 game cards are coated in a non-toxic bitterant to prevent children from trying to eat them.

Beginning on Switch 2, the physical release of some games may ship with Game Cards that only contain a digital license and no game data ("Game-Key Card"); when inserted, the game's files will be downloaded to the console. Unlike digital purchases, the Game Card must still be inserted to launch the game. Game-Key Cards are an evolution of a similar practice that was used by some third-party Switch games, which only contain a portion of the game's data on their cards due to file size constraints, and similarly required downloading the remainder of the data. Nintendo said that the introduction of game-key cards was to help future-proof the Switch 2 for many years, as that games keep growing larger and surpass the storage limit of game cards, using game-key cards still allows such games to be sold through retail in addition to digital distribution. Games that come on a Game-Key Card are not locked to a Nintendo account.

Nintendo released some original Switch games for the Switch 2 as "Switch 2 Editions", with improvements such as improved resolution, increased frame rates, decreased loading times or Joy-Con 2 mouse support. While Switch 2 editions can be played on the original Switch, the improvements are only implemented when played on a Switch 2.

=== Online services ===
The Nintendo Switch Online service is retained on the Switch 2. Via the subscription-based service, users on the Switch 2 can connect to friends as to play with them in multiplayer games and allow for cloud saves of their game data. As part of the existing legacy games service on Switch Online, a selection of games from the GameCube are distributed on the Expansion Pack, exclusively for Switch 2 under the rebranded "Nintendo Classics" moniker. The collection launched in tandem with the console in June 2025, and initially includes The Legend of Zelda: The Wind Waker, Soulcalibur II (both 2002), and F-Zero GX (2003). Other games, such as Luigi's Mansion (2001), Super Mario Sunshine (2002), Pokémon Colosseum (2003) and Fire Emblem: Path of Radiance (2005) were added procedurally at later dates. Additional features applied across the Nintendo Classics catalog are exclusively supported on Switch 2, namely CRT shaders and a rewind function being added to existing Nintendo 64 games on the service. Nintendo also released a new iteration of the GameCube controller alongside the platform's addition to Nintendo Classics, available exclusively to existing Switch Online subscribers. Switch 2 exclusive games cannot be purchased using earlier Game Vouchers that had been available on the original Switch.

A voice chat service known as GameChat allows users to conduct voice chats and screen sharing with friends. GameChat supports video calls using an optional webcam accessory. It is accessible via a "C" button on the right Joy-Con 2, on the new GameCube controller, and on the Nintendo Switch 2 Pro Controller. Chat was free to use until March 31, 2026, after which point a paid Nintendo Switch Online membership is required to use the feature. Smartphones such as the iPhone 15 and iPhone 16, as well as Android phones that support DisplayPort Alternate Mode, can be used as a webcam on the Switch 2 by using a USB-C to HDMI cable, in addition to a HDMI capture cable.

The console's reveal trailer in January 2025 was accompanied by early footage of Mario Kart World, later announced to launch alongside the Switch 2 on June 5. First-party Switch games for 2025 such as Metroid Prime 4: Beyond and Pokémon Legends: Z-A released with "Nintendo Switch 2 Edition" versions at launch, with graphical and performance enhancements. The Nintendo Switch 2 Welcome Tour game was revealed in the April 2 Direct, releasing as an online exclusive alongside the console launch.

=== Third-party support ===
A survey conducted at the 2024 Game Developers Conference in January 2024 inquired 3,000 independent and AAA developers on game creation and which platforms they were engaging, of which 250 individuals identified themselves as already producing games slated for Switch 2, and a further 32% of those surveyed expressed interest in developing for the console. In May 2024, Nintendo announced their intentions to acquire Miami-based developer Shiver Entertainment from its prior parent company Embracer Group, with the company detailing in a statement that the merger enabled them to procure specialized in-house resources for the development and porting of software, while allowing the studio to continue commitments to Switch and other platforms. Bloomberg News later reported that the acquisition was for bolstering Nintendo's efforts in securing games from third-party developers on Switch 2, with Shiver assisting external developers in the optimization of such games from competing platforms. In September 2024, developer Pathea Games announced My Time at Evershine, the spiritual successor to My Time at Portia (2019) and My Time at Sandrock (2023). In October 2024, Playtonic Games announced their upcoming remaster Yooka-Replaylee would be released on "Nintendo platforms."

During the Switch 2-focused Nintendo Direct in April 2025, multiple publishers pledged support for the console, including Square Enix, Capcom, Electronic Arts, Take-Two Interactive, CD Projekt Red, Bandai Namco, Sega, Supergiant Games, Warner Bros. Games, Activision Blizzard, and IO Interactive. An initial lineup of 46 games from publishing partners was confirmed, with 17 slated to coincide with the console's launch in June. Notable third-party releases revealed during the stream included Final Fantasy VII Remake Intergrade, Hades II, Borderlands 4, Yakuza 0 Director's Cut, Elden Ring - Tarnished Edition, Cyberpunk 2077 Ultimate Edition, Hitman: World of Assassination, 007 First Light, Split Fiction, Daemon x Machina: Titanic Scion, Street Fighter 6, and Deltarune Chapters 3+4. Both EA and Take-Two Interactive also formally committed to bringing their respective sports franchises, EA Sports FC, Madden NFL, WWE 2K, and NBA 2K to the platform. Nintendo was also revealed to be collaborating with partner studios on exclusive games for the system, such as Hyrule Warriors: Age of Imprisonment with Koei Tecmo, Kirby Air Riders with Bandai Namco Studios, and The Duskbloods with FromSoftware. Nintendo later stated in their November 2025 financial results briefing that the Switch 2 had the largest first-year software lineup from third-party developers of any Nintendo system.

Microsoft Gaming's Phil Spencer said that as part of their ongoing multiplatform distribution strategy, they will support the Switch 2 with ports of their Xbox games. Early releases from Microsoft subsidiaries include Tony Hawk's Pro Skater 3 + 4 from Activision, as well as Fallout 4 - Anniversary Edition and Indiana Jones and the Great Circle from Bethesda Softworks. Microsoft had previously signed an agreement with Nintendo to bring future entries in the Call of Duty franchise to their platforms as part of their acquisition bid for Activision Blizzard, which became legally binding in February 2023.

Publisher Ubisoft commented that they were "in love" with the console following its reveal, and released ports of Star Wars Outlaws and Assassin's Creed Shadows for the system during its launch window. Weicong Wu, producer of Marvel Rivals, expressed interest in bringing the game to the Switch 2, having stated that the team has already contacted Nintendo and possessed dev kits. However, he has stated that it will only come to the Switch 2 if the game's performance is satisfactory.

Around August 2025, Digital Foundry reported that smaller and indie studios had said that Nintendo was not providing Switch 2 hardware development kits, and directing them to focus on releases for the original Switch, which would still be playable on the Switch 2 with backwards compatibility. Nintendo had not made clear what the reasonings behind this was, but this decision was preventing these developers from releasing native Switch 2 games with support for the console's updated hardware or additional functionality like GameChat.

=== Backward compatibility ===
The Switch 2 is backward compatible with most Switch games, both physically and digitally, allowing certain games to run more stably than they did on the previous hardware. Some games are not directly compatible with the hardware changes in the Switch 2 and the Joy-Con 2 controllers, but may still be playable using the Joy-Con from the original Switch, such as games that require infrared functionality. For most other Switch games, they are playable using a type of emulation akin to a translation layer since the Switch 2 does not have the same hardware as the Switch. Hardware director Takuhiro Dohta described the solution as "somewhere in between a software emulator and hardware compatibility" and Tetsuya Sasaki said that the method used is "performed on a real-time basis as the data is read". This method allows Switch games to have Switch 2 features added, such as GameChat support, when played on the Switch 2. As of May 2025, of the 122 Nintendo-developed games tested, all were found to be compatible except the Nintendo Labo VR Kit, due to the Switch 2's larger size being unable to fit inside the accessory. As of 27 May 2025, Nintendo had tested 75% of the more than 15,000 third-party Switch games, finding that "around 170" of them had issues while all the rest were compatible. Some additional software, such as applications for Hulu and Crunchyroll, were also incompatible.

Certain Switch games have upgrades for the console sold separately or available via the Nintendo Switch Online Expansion Pack, with some adding new content. The initial upgrade lineup included Metroid Prime 4: Beyond, The Legend of Zelda: Breath of the Wild, The Legend of Zelda: Tears of the Kingdom, Super Mario Party Jamboree, Pokémon Legends: Z-A, and Kirby and the Forgotten Land, with both Zelda games being launch games. Other Switch games, such as Super Mario Odyssey and Pokémon Scarlet and Violet, have free performance updates for the Switch 2, but without additional content. The games can also be inserted into the original Switch to play the game as if it were a copy of the original Switch game.

In March 2026, a Switch 2 system update introduced the Handheld Boost Mode function: this function, available in the system settings, forces Nintendo Switch software to play in their TV Mode state whilst played on Nintendo Switch 2 in Handheld and Tabletop Modes. Whilst enabling players with generally improved resolution and performance for most original Switch titles, battery life is affected and handheld-specific functions such as the touchscreen are disabled.

To aid users in bringing their Switch games to the Switch 2, Nintendo introduced Virtual Game Cards for the original Switch system software in April 2025. Virtual Game Cards can be used to virtually transfer digitally purchased games for use on a second Switch or Switch 2 system, or loaned to a family member's Switch for up to two weeks at a time.

Joy-Con and Nintendo Switch Pro Controllers are mostly (Note: Waking the Switch 2 from sleep via an original Switch controller is not supported.) forward compatible with the Switch 2, with some Switch games requiring them in order to be compatible with the Switch 2. Such games include most Nintendo Labo games, Ring Fit Adventure (2019) and WarioWare: Move It! (2023).

== Reception ==
=== Critical response ===
Reception

Review scores
Publication	Score
Digital Trends	4/5
IGN	7/10
Nintendo Life	8/10
PC Gamer (US)	78/100
PCMag	4.0/5
The Guardian	4/5
Engadget	93/100
Mashable	4.4/5
The Verge	8/10
Wired	9/10

Digital Trends and TheGamer praised the dock's accessible design, while PCMag was ambivalent about it; other critics were satisfied by its improved ventilation system. The kickstand was praised for its design improvements and durability by some, though Wired was concerned about its security and thinness. The screen, especially given the lack of OLED, was the subject of commentary: Wired felt the 120 Hz refresh rate and HDR10 support made up for this. Critics agreed that the Switch 2's display was an improvement from the original Switch's; (Note: According to:) some felt the display was a drawback despite its strong points. Critics praised the design improvements to the Joy-Con, and some noted that the increased size of the SL and SR buttons was useful. Critics were unhappy without a solution to stick drift. Critics noted the computer mouse functionality of the Joy-Con worked well even on the user's leg. The console's reduced battery life was criticized; some unfavorably compared it to the original Switch launch edition's 2.5 to 6.5 hour power estimate, though Engadget felt this number was generally standard for high-end portable gaming devices, however, it still listed battery life as a negative in its summary.

The console's social features were praised. (Note: According to:) Wired described GameChat as "the most notable, wholly new feature" of the console, and Mashable described Nintendo not as reinventing the wheel with a two-decade-old concept, but moving it "beyond pure utility and into the realm of actively being enjoyable to use". Business Insider felt it was "made for quick, casual multiplayer sessions" rather than specialist communication. Critics praised the accuracy of the speech-to-text option and its ability to discern specific speakers. Critics praised the built-in microphone's noise cancellation capabilities. Many called GameChat's screenshare choppy. (Note: According to:) Mashable described the Virtual Game Card system as potentially a "logistical nightmare for competitive siblings" squabbling over possession of shared digital games. IGN stated that the Switch 2 "doesn't provide many of its own novel reasons to upgrade", scrutinised that Nintendo is "charging a substantial premium" and criticised the lack of comfortability of the Switch 2's Joy-Con and their lack of analog triggers. Similarly Nintendo Life stated that accessing games comes at a "significant cost" and highlighted the system's 256GB storage among the cons of the console in their review, saying it will "fill up fast". PC Gamer (US) said not to buy the Switch 2 if you want cheap games, that the console has a "hefty price tag" and highlighted that the Switch 2 Joy-Con are still capable of getting stick drift.

The launch game lineup was criticized as lacking; (Note: According to:) PC Gamer called it "one of the weakest" of recent times but added that "a new Mario Kart certainly eases the blow", referring to Mario Kart World. Critics criticized Nintendo for charging money for the launch game Nintendo Switch 2 Welcome Tour. Critics observed many of its launch games were ports from other systems that the original Switch could not run, and some praised the upgrades to original Switch games on Switch 2. PC Gamer wrote that the Deep Learning Super Sampling graphics technology made games like Cyberpunk 2077 "subjectively better" and encouraged the purchase of the console at launch for those who "can't get enough" of the exclusive Mario Kart, and Edge lauded the accuracy of the mouse features during gameplay of Metroid Prime 4: Beyond and Welcome Tour. Critics were concerned with the total price of the console, games, and general accessories. (Note: According to:) Concern also arose about the integrity of the original Switch data transfer function. The use of game-key cards, which require downloading data from Nintendo's server for the game to become playable, were considered a new type of digital rights management for physical games, and raised concerns on game ownership, video game preservation, and support for games after Nintendo phases out the Switch 2.

=== Sales ===
Life-to-date number of units shipped, millions
Date	Japan		Americas		Europe		Other		Total		Attach rate (Note: Given as the ratio of total software sales to total hardware sales)
Date	Hardware	Software	Hardware	Software	Hardware	Software	Hardware	Software	Hardware	Software	Attach rate
2025-06-30	1.27	1.76	2.08	3.31	1.34	2.42	1.13	1.17	5.82	8.67	1.49
2025-09-30	2.35	3.87	3.68	8.10	2.40	5.70	1.93	2.95	10.36	20.62	▲1.99
2025-12-31	4.78	9.16	5.98	14.10	4.10	10.18	2.50	4.48	17.37	37.93	▲2.18
2026-03-31	5.66	13.17	6.73	17.48	4.40	12.37	3.06	5.70	19.86	48.71	▲2.45
2026-06-30	6.70	16.16	7.95	20.98	5.37	14.40	3.66	6.63	23.68	58.17	▲2.46
2026-09-30	7.07	20.30	9.00	26.62	5.85	18.47	4.42	7.82	26.35	73.21	▲2.78

Nintendo reported on June 10, 2025, four days from release, that the Switch 2 had sold more than 3.5 million units worldwide, which made it the company's fastest selling console to date, while market research firm Niko Partners claimed this made it the fastest-selling console of all time. Famitsu reported that the console had sold 947,931 units in Japan within the first four days of its release, surpassing the Switch's launch of 329,152 units sold in the region. IGN said that launch sales of the Switch 2 in these first four days were twice as much as the launch sales of the Switch in all regions, and also claimed that the Switch 2 was the fastest-selling gaming hardware in the United States. By June 30, 2025, the end of Nintendo's first fiscal quarter for 2026, the console had sold over 5.8 million units worldwide, with sales exceeding 6 million through the end of July. Over 8.6 million games had been sold, with Mario Kart World selling more than 5.6 million, including copies sold as part of Switch 2 bundles. Console sales remained strong into the fall of 2025, with 2.4 million units sold in the US in the 3 months after launch according to industry analyst Mat Piscatella, exceeding the record pace set by the PlayStation 4 by 5%, and exceeding the pace of the original Switch by 77%.

As of December 31, 2025, the Nintendo Switch 2 had sold approximately 17.4 million units since its mid-2025 launch, contributing to Nintendo's strong quarterly profits.

During a February earnings call, Nintendo president Shuntaro Furukawa stated that despite a strong launch and total sales of over 17 million units since release, "overseas sales were somewhat weaker than expected" and the adjustment was attributed to slower consumer demand rather than cost pressure. The following month, Bloomberg News reported that Nintendo had reduced planned production of the Switch 2 by more than 30% after demand, particularly in the United States, fell short of expectations. The report noted that the company lowered quarterly output to about 4 million units, down from an initially planned 6 million, with the reduced pace expected to continue into the following quarter.

Following a surge in sales prior to its price increase, the Nintendo Switch 2 experienced an 87% decline in Japan, with sales dropping to 31,751 units the week after the May 25th price hike. The system's sales had peaked at over 200,000 units weekly in the weeks leading up to the increase, after previously averaging 44,000 to 52,000 units. The price of the Nintendo Switch 2 was raised from ¥49,980 to ¥59,980, which Nintendo attributed to current market conditions.

=== Awards ===
The Switch 2 won the Minister of Economy, Trade and Industry Award at the Japan Game Awards 2025. The console and the Pro Controller, were also nominated for Best Gaming Hardware at the Golden Joystick Awards 2025.

== See also ==
- List of handheld game consoles
- List of Nintendo products
