= Sun Haven =

2023 video game

- Developer: Pixel Sprout Studios
- Publisher: Pixel Sprout Studios
- Engine: Unity
- Platforms: Windows, Nintendo Switch
- Release: Windows: WW: March 11, 2023; Switch: NA: November 29, 2024; SA: November 29, 2024; EU: December 16, 2024
- Genres: Cozy, farm life sim, action role-playing
- Modes: Single-player, multiplayer (Note: Windows only)

Sun Haven is a 2023 farm life sim action role-playing game developed and published by Pixel Sprout Studios. The video game was released on March 11, 2023 for Windows. The game was also ported to the Nintendo Switch in North and South America on November 29, 2024 and in Europe on December 16, 2024. It has often been compared with similar games such as Stardew Valley and Dungeons & Dragons.

== Gameplay ==
Sun Haven is a pixel art farm sim video game where players can farm, fish, mine and romance NPCs, similar to Stardew Valley and My Time at Sandrock. Players start off with a cutscene with Lynn, and then move on to the train. A blackout then occurs on board the train with all the lights going out. Once the player arrives in the town of Sun Haven, they would have the option of placing their house anywhere on their farm. Unlike many other farm sims, this one does not have stamina. In addition to Sun Haven, this game features three other towns that the player will discover. Combat is available, with characters available to choose classes similar to Dungeons & Dragons; combat occurs in real time and provides characters with tools and experience points, which can be used to upgrade the skills for characters. Alternative pacifist options to avoid combat against boss characters and story moments are available. Players even have the option to marry Lucia, the leader of Sun Haven.

== Development ==
Sun Haven was developed and published by Pixel Sprout Studios, an American indie developer based in Los Angeles. This game was initially on early access at June 25, 2021, following a successful 2020 Kickstarter, before fully releasing on March 11, 2023. It was initially due to release six months after entering early access and did not gain much traction until then. The game was also released on the Nintendo Switch on November 29, 2024 in North and South America. It was then released on the European market on December 16, 2024. However, cross-platform play was initially not available, alongside multiplayer. There are also further plans to release this game onto other consoles in the foreseeable future.

In mid-2024, the game released version 1.4, its largest update to date. This added several features, including new marriage candidates and a new underwater region known as the "Brinestone Deeps".

== Reception ==
Sun Haven has received favorable reviews from critics and has often been compared to Stardew Valley. An early access review from PCGamesN that "the world has awoken to the charm of this particular hybrid between RPG games and farming games". Another early access review from RPGFan stated that the game is a "mystical world" which is "inviting, endearing, and quite original". Meanwhile, after full release, Anna Koselke on GamesRadar+ states that this game is pretty much like Stardew Valley, but more magical and fantastic. WIRED states that the game is 'cozy' and that "the storyline is rich". TheGamer states that it is one of the few games to combine farming RPG and various other mechanics.
