= My Time at Evershine =

Upcoming video game

- Developer: Pathea Games
- Publisher: Pathea Games
- Platforms: Nintendo Switch 2; PlayStation 5; Windows; Xbox Series X/S
- Release: 2027
- Genres: Simulation, role-playing
- Modes: Single-player, multiplayer

My Time at Evershine is an upcoming video game developed and published by Pathea Games. It is a sequel to My Time at Portia and My Time at Sandrock. The game is scheduled to be released in 2027.

== Gameplay ==
My Time at Evershine has the player play as the governor of a small town in a post-apocalyptic setting. Much like its predecessors, collecting resources is part of the main gameplay. The game also has multiple romance options. The game has a more realistic art style than its predecessors.

The game has a more developed multiplayer system than its predecessor My Time at Sandrock, with four player co-op that allow multiple players to complete quests together.

== Plot ==
Like the previous two games, the story takes place in a post-apocalyptic world 300 years after the Day of Calamity, an event that has destroyed previous civilizations and most modern technologies, causing people to rebuild society and eventually form the Alliance of Free Cities and a military organization called the Civil Corps. The Alliance is at war against a tyrannical empire called Duvos, who seek to obtain ancient technology and conquer other regions for its own gain.

== Development and release ==
Developer Pathea Games is based in Chongqing, China. My Time At Evershine was first revealed on September 17, 2024. It will release for the PlayStation 5, Xbox Series X and Series S, and Nintendo Switch 2.

The Kickstarter for the game, which went online on September 24, 2024, managed to reach its goal in 35 minutes, and managed to raise over a million dollars in 24 hours. The game was originally planned to be released in 2026 for Windows and consoles simultaneously, but was delayed to 2027.
