= IGDC =

Indian video game industry event

- Status: Active
- Genre: Video games; Interactive entertainment
- Location: Hyderabad
- Country: India
- Inaugurated: 2008
- Most recent: November 2024
- Website: indiagdc.com

IGDC (short for India Game Developer Conference) is an annual expo of upcoming video games in India.

The event is mainly participated by Indian game developers and publishers but foreign video game companies like Rockstar Games also engaged. The conference features multiple tracks, including art, code, design, production, business, and specialized tools such as Unity and Unreal Engine.

Alongside the expo, IGDC hosts keynote lectures, workshops, and panel discussions with industry leaders, providing insights into global trends, best practices, and emerging technologies in gaming. It serves as a hub for knowledge exchange, talent discovery, and fostering connections within the Indian and international game development ecosystem.
