= ChinaJoy =

Digital entertainment expo held annually in Shanghai, China

ChinaJoy China Digital Entertainment Expo and Conference
- Status: Active
- Genre: Multi-genre
- Venue: Shanghai New International Expo Center
- Location: Shanghai
- Coordinates: 31°12′40″N 121°33′47″E
- Country: China
- Inaugurated: 2004
- Website: chinajoy.net en.chinajoy.net

ChinaJoy, formally China Digital Entertainment Expo and Conference (中国国际数码互动娱乐展览会; 'China International Digital Interactive Entertainment Exhibition'), is a digital entertainment expo held annually in Shanghai, China.

The exhibition is the largest gaming and digital entertainment exhibition held in China and Asia.

== History ==
On November 5, 2002, it was announced that the first exhibition would be held at the China International Exhibition Center in Beijing from July 11 to 13, 2003. Later, in response to the need for expansion, the exhibition was relocated to the Beijing Exhibition Center, with the dates rescheduled to July 25–27. Due to the SARS outbreak, the exhibition had to be delayed one more time to January 16–18, 2004. Over 100 Chinese and international companies took part in the exhibition, which attracted a total of 58,244 visitors.
