= My Time at Portia =

2019 video game

- Developer: Pathea Games
- Publisher: Team17 (Note: Mobile ports published by Nuverse subsidiary Pixmain.)
- Director: Zhi Xu
- Producers: Zifei Wu; Dylan Li
- Designer: Zhi Xu
- Programmers: Calvie Xie; Jiangbo Zhu
- Writer: Zifei Wu
- Composer: Claude Ruelle
- Engine: Unity
- Platforms: Windows; Nintendo Switch; PlayStation 4; Xbox One; Android; iOS
- Release: Windows; 15 January 2019; Nintendo Switch, PlayStation 4, Xbox One; 16 April 2019; Android, iOS; 4 August 2021; macOS; 12 May 2022
- Genres: Farm sim, role-playing, simulation
- Mode: Single-player

My Time at Portia is a 2019 farm life sim role-playing video game developed by Pathea Games and published by Team17. It was released on 15 January 2019 for Windows and the release on the Nintendo Switch, Xbox One, PlayStation 4, Android, iOS and macOS followed suit. It has some similarities to other farm sims such as Stardew Valley. A sequel, My Time at Sandrock, entered early access on 26 May 2022 and was fully released on 2 November 2023. Another sequel, My Time at Evershine, is in development.

== Plot ==
=== Setting ===
The game takes place long after civilization has been destroyed, where humans have emerged from underground and begun rebuilding society, eventually banding together to form the Alliance of Free Cities and a military organization called the Civil Corps. The Alliance is at war against a tyrannical empire called Duvos, who seek to obtain ancient technology and conquer other regions for its own gain.

=== Story ===
The player (male is by default named Marco and female is by default named Linda) is cast in the role of the child of a famous builder, who inherits their father's workshop in the independent city state of Portia after he goes traveling. Once the player arrives in Portia, they are greeted by Presley, the commissioner of a guild, who escorts them to the workshop. The goal of the game is to expand the city of Portia and become the best builder while also facing rivalry with another builder named Higgins.

The player starts by constructing a bridge to a location called Amber Island and has run-ins with humanoid rats called Bandirats that have been stealing things around town, a pair of bandits named Tuss and Huss who are pretending to be debt collectors before being exposed by a builder named Arlo, and panda/bat hybrid monsters called Panbats who are poisoning the environment. Gale, Portia's mayor, has also made plans to construct transportation called Dee Dees and requests for the player to build them.

After fixing a broken pipe, the player is knocked into an underground cavern along with fellow builder Sam, where they fight the Rat King, the leader of the Bandirats, who are responsible for the town's recent water pollutions. The player also discovers a robot chef named Ack from an ancient civilization, having crash landed in Portia in an ancient spacecraft, who later becomes a town resident and chef. Gale also makes plans to build a museum and a tunnel to a neighboring city called Sandrock with the help of a visiting builder named Mint.

While examining an old mine to find out the cause of mysterious recent earthquakes, Mint and fellow builders Sam and Arlo get trapped in a cave-in and the player works with another builder named Remington, who is also a member of the Civil Corps, to rescue them from a rogue robot called Rock-on. It turns out the earthquakes are caused by the robot itself. After building wind turbines, constructing a hot air balloon attraction, and making improvements to the harbor, an investor named Musa from the Alliance arrives to help with improving the town. Mali, an agent from the Alliance Central Intelligence, arrives to investigate the ancient technology.

The player later works with Sam to capture Tuss and Huss, who are believed to have stolen an ancient relic. The real thief later infiltrates the town in search for a powerful A.I. called the All Source. The builders and Mali capture the thief, who is revealed to be a masked knight called the Rogue Knight, but he is too strong for them to defeat and escapes.

The player later works with the other builders and Alliance agents Ursula Everglade, Ryder, and Ten to find and activate three keys in ancient ruins to unlock the way to the All Source. They soon learn that Mali's plane was shot down while on her way to warn the Alliance. Upon finding the base where the All Source is, Ursula, Ryder, and Ten betray and capture them with the help of Rogue Knight, revealing themselves to be a band of pirates called the Sky Sharks pretending to be Alliance agents, but a reformed Tuss and Huss rescue them.

The builders deduct that the Sky Sharks have a mole working with the telegrams. They infiltrate the base and defeat Ursula, who escapes, but Rogue Knight finds and activates the All Source, using it to attack the town, though a boy named Toby steals an essential part of All Source to prevent it from teleporting. This results in the school being destroyed.

After the player defeats it, they fight Rogue Knight, but is overpowered. They are saved by Django, Toby's uncle, who is strong enough to fight back against Rogue Knight, revealing himself to be the legendary Storm Knight. This forces Rogue Knight to flee while Ryder, Ten, and the Sky Sharks' mole are arrested and the All Source, whose actual name is Wendy, is reprogrammed to help the town.

It is later discovered that the Sky Sharks and Rogue Knight are working for Duvos, and that Mali survived the crash, revealed to have been caused by the Sky Sharks. The player helps rebuild the town and marries a bachelor or bachelorette. Their father, referred to as Pa, visits them and presents them with the Robopig Rider, a pig-like hovercraft. The story ends with Pa leaving town afterwards to go on another journey.

== Gameplay ==
The player must gather resources and combine them in recipes to create items. Eventually, players gain more tools that allow them to harvest resources faster, such as a chainsaw to chop down large trees. Once items are complete, they can be submitted for rewards, town favor and money. The largest assignments can directly change the town itself. The game also contains dungeons that require the player to fight enemies. Players are able to romance (hang out and marry) certain NPCs. Gameplay is done in a third-person perspective and combines aspects of role-playing video games and simulation games.

== Development ==
My Time at Portia was initially released by Chinese studio Pathea Games as an early access game on Steam from 23 January 2018 before being fully released a year later. Three months later, it was ported to the following consoles: Nintendo Switch, Xbox One and PlayStation 4. A mobile version for Android and iOS was released on 5 August 2021 followed by macOS on 12 May 2022.

In October 2025, it was announced that Seed Lab, the developer of Starsand Island, collaborated with Pathea Games My Time at Portia. Starsand Island will release on 1 February 2026 featuring two characters from Portia.

== Reception ==
Reception

Aggregate score
Aggregator	Score
Metacritic	PC: 73/100; NS: 71/100; PS4: 75/100; XONE: 73/100 iOS: 72/100

Review scores
Publication	Score
Destructoid	5.5/10
GameRevolution	8/10
GameSpot	6/10
GamesRadar+	4.5/5
IGN	8/10
Nintendo Life	7/10
PC Gamer (US)	63/100
Pocket Gamer	(iOS) 4/5
Push Square	7/10
RPGamer	3.5/5
TouchArcade	(iOS) 4/5

My Time at Portia received "mixed or average" reviews, according to review aggregator Metacritic. Miranda Sanchez of IGN called its core gameplay fun, but saying that each of its parts was lacking in some way, and that the game had "annoying audio bugs". Alex Fuller of RPGamer called the game "charming" and "a lovely place to spend time in", but also saying that it was too long, criticizing how "players have to wait for NPCs to decide to do something". He stated that it was "very enjoyable", but had "significant weaknesses". Rich Meister of Destructoid said that while the world was "bright and full of charm", "waiting around for things to happen can get old pretty fast", and calling the game's mining "painfully dull". Philippa Warr of PC Gamer criticized the game's pacing, stating, "By being so slow, My Time At Portia both repels and appeals. It offers a kind of gaming oasis, making few demands and just pootling along. That type of thing can be a place of respite for the right player or the right mood." Ginny Woo of GameSpot praised its tranquil environment, pleasing aesthetics, and well-designed crafting system while lamenting the lack of meaning in several mechanics, the lack of payoff in the narrative's premise, and the conflicting day-night cycle pacing. Zoe Delahunty-Light of GamesRadar+ lauded the convincing NPCs, varied seasonal events, and sense of progression while taking issue with the loading times and lack of voice acting in cutscenes. Chris Scullion of Nintendo Life recommended the game after a patch was issued in order to fix its lengthy loading times. Rebecca Stow of Push Square called the game "vibrant, relaxing, and brimming with charm".

The PC version was among the best-selling new releases of the month on Steam. (Note: Based on total revenue for the first two weeks on sale.)

== Sequel ==
In October 2020, Pathea Games announced a sequel titled My Time at Sandrock, set on a desert and planned to release it in early access for PC via Steam in March 2021, with the full version for Nintendo Switch, PlayStation 4, PlayStation 5, Xbox One and Xbox Series X/S originally planned for a mid-2022 release. However, in March 2021, Pathea Games announced that they had not received a local rating certification to publish the game online, so it seemed like early access would be potentially delayed until after May 2021. Early access release was subsequently pushed out further until early 2022. The game released via early access on 26 May 2022. After a delay from its September launch window, the full version of the game was released on 2 November 2023. While there are no plans to introduce multiplayer to My Time at Portia, its sequel does.

In September 2024, Pathea Games announced a second sequel titled My Time at Evershine, set in a whole new world and with improved multiplayer.
