= Songs of Glimmerwick =

2026 simulator video game

- Developer: Eastshade Studios
- Publisher: Eastshade Studios
- Platform: Windows
- Release: September 30, 2026
- Genre: Simulator
- Mode: Single-player

Songs of Glimmerwick is an open-world role-playing simulation video game developed and published by Eastshade Studios, known by 2019 adventure game Eastshade. It was released on Steam on September 30, 2026. It was largely compared to the world of Harry Potter, with the same theme of a "magic school".

== Gameplay ==
The player takes control of a student in a magic academia, living through four seasons of everyday school life. Players cast magic by using they keyboard to create music notes, forming a unique melody that is transformed into a spell, which can help with tasks like fishing or gardening. By exploring the world and completing tasks, players gain experience, which will allow unlocking special skills, useful in everyday routine. Players can also brew potions from the ingredients grown by them in gardens.

== Reception ==
The game has been received warmly, described as cosy, praised for its unique 2.5D artstyle and giving "a genuine sense of wonder." Many reviewers compared it to Harry Potter and Stardew Valley, where everyday magic plays the core role, while gathering and gardening make it reminiscent of farming simulator games.
