= Sunkissed City =

Upcoming video game

- Developer: Arthur Lee
- Publisher: Arthur Lee
- Platforms: Linux; macOS; Windows
- Release: 2027
- Genre: Farm life sim
- Modes: Single-player, multiplayer

Sunkissed City is an upcoming farm life simulation video game developed by Arthur "Mr. Podunkian" Lee. Taking place in the fictional low fantasy Apollo City, it features 16-bit style graphics, growing plants in urban gardens, and dating sim mechanics. The player, an employee of the Pico megacorporation, must work with the city's ecological community but also stop a mysterious illness and monster invasion. The game is also planned to include single-player and co-op multiplayer mechanics. Lee had previously worked on Stardew Valley in a development capacity before parting ways with ConcernedApe in 2022, and the game's appearance and design have been compared to it by critics. While originally scheduled for release in 2024 for Windows, MacOS and Linux, it has since been delayed to 2026. It is also planned for unknown consoles following its Steam release.

== Development ==
The game drew inspiration from the Persona series for its city setting and character artwork.

== Reception ==
Graham Smith of Rock Paper Shotgun said that Sunkissed City interested him more than most Stardew Valley-like games, describing it as ambitious in scope, and remarking on Lee's former history as an indie developer. Hope Bellingham of GamesRadar+ said that it looked "like Stardew Valley in the city", describing it as "vibrant" and "exciting" and also praising its planned online and split-screen multiplayer modes.
