= Farm life sim =

Farm and social sim hybrid video games

Farm life sims (also called farming sim or farm sim) are a subgenre of life simulation games which fuse social simulation, dating sim and farm simulation elements. Games in the genre generally feature a protagonist going out to a rural setting and taking on a farm, oftentimes as an inheritance from a deceased relative, or because of urban boredom. The player-character grows typically crops and raises livestock to make money, interacts with a wide cast of characters, and works toward the main plot's objective, if one exists. The game plots often feature declining ghost towns that must be revitalized by the player's actions. The games tend to feature simplified and less realistic farming as opposed to a simulation, such as Farming Simulator.

The genre was originated by the 1996-2013 series Story of Seasons, originally titled Harvest Moon. Alongside its fantasy spin-off series Rune Factory, it was almost the sole series in the genre until 2016 release of Stardew Valley, a successful indie game inspired by it, which popularized farm life sims as a distinct genre.

== History ==
The first example of the genre was the 1996 game Harvest Moon, which released in the later stages of the SNES console lifespan. Inspired by his childhood in the countryside and the game series Derby Stallion, producer Yasuhiro Wada wanted to make a rural setting "role-playing" game without any combat. The game starred Pete as he moves out to the country to take upon a farm he inherited from his grandfather. The player could explore the town and interact with its inhabitants. As a bonus, the player could bond with and marry eligible bachelorettes in town, making it one of the earliest examples of a dating sim. A later influential game in the Story of Seasons series was the spinoff Rune Factory which married farm life sim games with the Japanese role-playing game (JRPG) genre and featured dungeon crawling. JRPG fusions are now a noted variant of farm life sims.

As the series was relatively unique, it was marketed as a role-playing game and remained a stable, consistent property, but did not sell in great numbers for many years. In 2016, Eric Barone released the self-developed game Stardew Valley to widespread acclaim, becoming one of the most successful indie games ever. The game formally established the farm life sim genre, and the phrase "farm life sim" was coined following its release.

After Stardew Valley's success, the genre experienced a massive boom in popularity, and more farm life sims would release, many of which were also indie. Square Enix would put out Harvestella, a JRPG fusion in the vein of Rune Factory.

== Examples ==
Title	Series	Release	Additional genres
Harvest Moon	Story of Seasons	1996	Cozy
Rune Factory: A Fantasy Harvest Moon	Rune Factory	2004	Action RPG
Innocent Life: A Futuristic Harvest Moon	Story of Seasons	2006	Cozy
Stardew Valley		2016	Cozy
My Time at Portia	My Time	2019	Cozy
Atomicrops		2020	Bullet hell, roguelike
Sakuna: Of Rice and Ruin		2020	Action RPG
Kitaria Fables		2021	Action RPG
Wylde Flowers		2022	
Ooblets		2022	
Harvestella		2022	Action RPG
Sun Haven		2023	Action RPG, cozy
Roots of Pacha		2023	Cozy
Fae Farm		2023	Cozy
Paleo Pines		2023	
My Time at Sandrock	My Time	2023	Cozy
Coral Island		2023	Cozy
Disney Dreamlight Valley		2023	Adventure, cozy
Farmagia		2024	Action RPG
Dinkum		2025	Cozy, survival
Fields of Mistria		2026	Cozy
Doloc Town		2026	Cozy
Songs of Glimmerwick		2026	Cozy
My Time at Evershine	My Time	Upcoming	
Sunkissed City		Upcoming	

=== Other ===
Joining in on the genre's boom, the 2.0 update of popular social sim Animal Crossing: New Horizons was released in November 2021. It added the ability to create a farm and grow produce.

== See also ==
- Cozy game
- Farming simulator
