= Haunted Chocolatier =

Upcoming video game

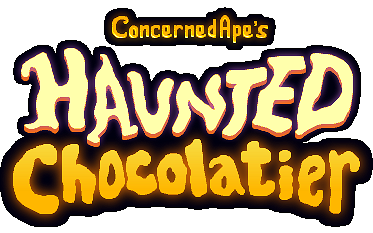
- Developer: ConcernedApe
- Publisher: ConcernedApe
- Director: Eric Barone
- Designer: Eric Barone
- Programmer: Eric Barone
- Engine: MonoGame
- Platform: Windows
- Genres: Simulation, action role-playing
- Mode: Single-player

Haunted Chocolatier is an upcoming simulation and action role-playing game developed and published by Eric Barone, known professionally as ConcernedApe, the creator of Stardew Valley. The single-player game casts the player as a chocolatier who lives in a haunted castle, collects ingredients, makes chocolates, and sells them in a shop, while getting to know the residents of a new town. Barone has said that combat is a greater focus than in Stardew Valley.

Barone began developing the game in 2020, after the commercial success of Stardew Valley, and announced it in October 2021. He is developing it alone on a new engine built with the MonoGame framework. His work on updates to Stardew Valley has interrupted its development, including a pause beginning in April 2023 for the 1.6 update. He returned to the game in December 2024.

Barone is self-publishing the game and has said that, as with Stardew Valley, it will not use early access, crowdfunding, or pre-orders. PC is the only platform he has committed to. As of August 2026, no release date has been announced, and Barone has said that he will release the game only when it is finished.

== Gameplay ==
Like Stardew Valley, the game centers on settling into a new town and getting to know its residents, but the player's livelihood comes from a chocolate shop in a haunted castle rather than from a farm. Barone has described it as more of an action role-playing game than Stardew Valley. He has confirmed that romantic relationships will feature, as in Stardew Valley. He has said that the core of the game is a loop of collecting ingredients, producing chocolate, and managing the shop, and that there is more to the game than that.

=== Chocolate making and the shop ===
Chocolate can be made in several ways, ranging from an intuition-driven method to more conventional, mechanical ones, and Barone has said that there will be reasons to use each. The announcement trailer also showed the player customizing the shop, with options such as different countertop styles, and displaying chocolates for sale while ghosts carry chocolates around the room.

=== Combat ===
Barone has said that combat is a greater focus than in Stardew Valley. Footage released as of May 2026 has shown swords, a bow and arrow, and shields. Blocking an attack with a shield will usually stun the enemy, giving the player a window for faster attacks, and Barone has said that other off-hand items will suit different play styles.

=== Scope and multiplayer ===
In May 2026, Barone said that the game is considerably larger than Stardew Valley, with more maps and monsters and more depth in its item and equipment systems. He has also confirmed that fishing will be included. The game is single-player, and as of May 2026 Barone has no plans for multiplayer. He has said that parts of the game may change before release.

== Development ==
Barone began work on Haunted Chocolatier in 2020, after the commercial success of Stardew Valley. He worked on the game in secret for more than a year before announcing it, and, as with Stardew Valley, intended it to be a solo project.

In April 2023, Barone announced a pause on the game to work on the 1.6 update to Stardew Valley. That update had been planned as a largely technical release to improve modding support, to be handled by others, but his involvement led to a much larger amount of new content, and subsequent bug fixing and porting work kept him away from Haunted Chocolatier. In December 2024, he wrote that he was returning to the game. Before the pause he had built a vertical slice, an early version of the game with most, though not all, of its major components in place. By spring 2025, he said, his responsibilities from the 1.6 update had subsided, leaving him more time for the game.

In September 2025, following the announcement of a further Stardew Valley update (version 1.7), Barone wrote that it could slow development of Haunted Chocolatier to some extent, though less than fans might fear. Because a small team assists with Stardew Valley updates, he planned to take a more supervisory creative-director role on 1.7, leaving most of his attention for Haunted Chocolatier, which he said he was still making entirely on his own.

In January 2026, responding to fan rumors, Barone wrote that he had not abandoned Haunted Chocolatier and would not fold its content into Stardew Valley, which he called a separate game built on a different engine. In June 2026, he wrote that he was still working on the game and had been reworking the recipe-book interface used for making chocolates, and in August he wrote that he had been productive and would not rush its release.

=== Concept and design ===
Barone has contrasted the game with Stardew Valley. He has said that where the earlier game was about living off the land, he wanted his next game to move beyond everyday experience into more imaginative territory, and to emphasize creativity and luxury.

Barone has said that the haunted setting is not meant to make the game grim and that he intends it to be a positive experience, while also describing its mood as darker and more mysterious than that of Stardew Valley. He has also said that the game will have some connection to Stardew Valley, but the game's FAQ says that he is not yet willing to say whether the two share a setting.

=== Technology ===
Pre-release screenshot of Haunted Chocolatier from 2021

Barone is writing the game in C# on a new engine built with the MonoGame framework rather than reusing the engine of Stardew Valley, although he is able to reuse some code from that game. It uses a pixel art style similar to that of Stardew Valley.

== Marketing and release ==
Barone announced Haunted Chocolatier on October 21, 2021, with a gameplay trailer and a dedicated website. In September 2023, TechRadar described the game as one of the most anticipated independent games then in development. Barone later said that announcing the game so early was a mistake, though he said he had reasons for doing so. In 2024, he wrote that the early announcement had built up excitement, which put pressure on him to avoid a long wait.

He has shared little about the game since the announcement, posting occasional screenshots on social media, including several in October 2023 to mark reaching one million followers on X (formerly Twitter), and has said that he would rather not show or describe its systems at length before they are finished, partly because they may change.

Barone is self-publishing the game and has said that he expects to bring in outside help for console ports and localization once the game is nearly finished. PC is the only platform he has confirmed, though he intends to release the game on other major platforms as well. English is the only language he has committed to, with other languages intended.

As of August 2026, no release date has been announced. Barone has declined to give a release date or estimate, saying that he prefers to work without that pressure, and has said that the game will be released when it is ready. He has also said that, as with Stardew Valley, it will not use early access, crowdfunding, or pre-orders.
