= Doloc Town =

- Developer: RedSaw Games Studio
- Publisher: Logoi Games
- Platform: Windows
- Release: 6 August 2026
- Genre: Farm life sim
- Mode: Single-player

Doloc Town (Chinese: 多洛可小镇) is a farm life sim developed by RedSaw Games Studio and published by Logoi Games. Set in a post-apocalyptic wasteland, it puts players in the role of a young scavenger who strives for building the titular town.

The game was first launched in early access on 8 May 2025, and fully released on 6 August 2026.

== Gameplay ==
Doloc Town is a farm life sim set in a post-apocalyptic world, putting players in the role of a young scavenger, Proti. The objective is to build a settlement in an inhospitable wasteland, collect inhabitants to restore the titular town, and find the "Eden", a mystical, utopian place that existed before the world's end.

The game takes a side-scrolling view, granting the player an ability to utilize verticality for its farming and building systems.

== Development and release ==
Doloc Town was developed by RedSaw Games Studio. It was announced in October 2024. A free public demo was published on 17 November 2024. The game was launched in early access for Windows via Steam on 8 May 2025. It received several major updates during the period, with Steam Workshop support added in June 2026. Doloc Town was fully released on 6 August 2026 with a finale that concludes its main story mode.

== Reception ==
Reception

Aggregate score
Aggregator	Score
OpenCritic	100% recommend (Note: Based on 14 reviews.)

Review scores
Publication	Score
Hardcore Gamer	4/5
RPGamer	3.5/5
CG Magazine	8/10

Doloc Town's pixel art graphics were praised. CG Magazine found the pixel art aesthetic "colorful" and said it provides a counterbalance to the post-apocalyptic setting and visual diversity.
