= Stardew Valley: Festival of Seasons =

2024–2026 concert tour

- Location: Australia; Europe; North America; Asia
- Associated album: Stardew Valley (Original Game Soundtrack)
- Start date: February 16, 2024
- End date: April 25, 2026
- Legs: 3
- Website: www.stardewvalleyconcert.com

concert chronology
- Stardew Valley: Festival of Seasons (2024–2026); Stardew Valley: Symphony of Seasons (2025–2026)

Stardew Valley: Festival of Seasons is a concert tour featuring music from the video game Stardew Valley. All music belongs to the game's producer and developer, Eric Barone. The tour was produced by Eric Barone and SOHO Live.

== History ==
On October 10, 2023, Eric Barone announced the first Stardew Valley concert tour, Stardew Valley: Festival of Seasons. During the tour, selected music from the game was performed live by a chamber orchestra. The first leg of the tour kicked off in Los Angeles on February 16, 2024. The concert program is based on the four seasons of the valley and the music of the festivals. New dates for Taipei, Quebec City and Halifax were added, with the shows happening in 2025 and 2026. On April 7, 2025, a date for Manila was added for 2026.

== Reception ==
Nintendo Life's Andy McDonald said the biggest lesson from the concert was its ability to connect and move people. Ted Litchfield from PC Gamer noted that Stardew Valley soundtrack contains peaceful, nostalgic pieces that feel like a lost relic of childhood.

== Tour dates ==
List of 2024 concerts, showing date, city, country, venue
Date (2024)	City	Country	Venue
February 16	Los Angeles	United States	The Eli and Edythe Broad Stage
February 17	Los Angeles	United States	The Eli and Edythe Broad Stage
February 23	Boston	United States	Berklee Performance Center
February 24	Philadelphia	United States	Perelman Theater
February 27	New York City	United States	The Town Hall
February 29	New York City	United States	The Town Hall
March 2	Seattle	United States	Benaroya Hall
March 3	Seattle	United States	Benaroya Hall
March 9	Chicago	United States	The Vic Theatre
March 10	St. Louis	United States	The Sheldon
March 14	Toronto	Canada	Meridian Arts Centre
March 15	Toronto	Canada	Meridian Arts Centre
March 17	Montreal	Canada	Place des Arts
March 22	Bangkok	Thailand	Prince Mahidol Hall
March 23	Ottawa	Canada	National Arts Centre
March 24	Seoul	South Korea	Mapo Art Center
March 27	Vancouver	Canada	Vogue Theatre
March 28	Edmonton	Canada	Myer Horowitz Theatre
April 5	Melbourne	Australia	Melbourne Recital Centre
April 7	Perth	Australia	Perth Concert Hall
April 9	Melbourne	Australia	Melbourne Recital Centre
April 13	Wellington	New Zealand	Opera House
April 14	Auckland	New Zealand	Aotea Centre
April 19	Brisbane	Australia	Brisbane City Hall
April 20	Sydney	Australia	Sydney Conservatorium of Music
April 27	Sydney	Australia	Sydney Conservatorium of Music
April 28	Birmingham	England	Birmingham Town Hall
April 29	London	England	Cadogan Hall
May 1	Berlin	Germany	Columbiahalle
May 3	Paris	France	Bataclan
May 5	Edinburgh	Scotland	Queen's Hall
May 5	Cincinnati	United States	Hamilton County Memorial Building
May 5	Montreal	Canada	Place des Arts
May 9	Milan	Italy	Teatro Carcano
May 13	London	England	Cadogan Hall
May 18	Portland	United States	Aladdin Theater
May 29	Tampa	United States	Tampa Theatre
June 1	Philadelphia	United States	Perelman Theater
June 7	Kansas City	United States	Folly Theater
June 9	San Francisco	United States	Palace of Fine Arts
June 15	Austin	United States	Paramount Theatre
July 14	Atlanta	United States	Center Stage Theater
July 14	Manchester	England	Stoller Hall
August 26	Singapore		Esplanade – Theatres on the Bay
September 27	Tokyo	Japan	Kioi Hall

List of 2025 concerts, showing date, city, country, venue
Date (2025)	City	Country	Venue
May 24 (Note: This date has two showings, an afternoon and an evening show.)	Taipei	Taiwan	Zhongshan Hall
September 6	Kuala Lumpur	Malaysia	Zepp Kuala Lumpur
September 7	Kuala Lumpur	Malaysia	Zepp Kuala Lumpur
October 4	Jakarta	Indonesia	Ciputra Artpreneur

List of 2026 concerts, showing date, city, country, venue
Date (2026)	City	Country	Venue
January 14	St. John's	Canada	Arts and Culture Centre
January 18	Victoria	Canada	Royal Theatre
January 23	London	Canada	Centennial Hall
March 5	Quebec City	Canada	Palais Montcalm
March 7 (Note: This date has two showings, an afternoon and an evening show.)	Halifax	Canada	Dalhousie Arts Centre
April 25 (Note: This date has two showings, an afternoon and an evening show.)	Parañaque (Note: Labeled as Manila in promotion material.)	Philippines	The Theatre at Solaire

== See also ==
- Stardew Valley: The Board Game
- The Official Stardew Valley Cookbook
- Stardew Valley Guidebook
- Stardew Valley: Original Soundtrack
- Stardew Valley: Symphony of Seasons
