= Kitaria Fables =

2021 video game

- Developer: Twin Hearts
- Publisher: PQube
- Composer: Esteban Tamashiro
- Platforms: Nintendo Switch; PlayStation 4; PlayStation 5; Windows; Xbox One; Xbox Series X/S
- Release: September 2, 2021
- Genre: Role-playing
- Modes: Single-player, multiplayer

Kitaria Fables is a 2021 role-playing video game. It was developed by Indonesian indie game studio Twin Hearts and released by PQube. It received "mixed or average reviews" according to Metacritic.

A sequel, titled Kitaria Fables 2, is scheduled to release in Spring 2027 for Nintendo Switch 2, PlayStation 5, Windows, and Xbox Series X/S.

== Gameplay ==
Kitaria Fables is a role-playing video game that utilizes custom movesets in lieu of a traditional class system. In combat, one button is used to attack, one is used to dodge, and a third button is used to cast spells. The player can upgrade their weapons and armor using materials obtained from killing monsters. The player can also farm, growing crops to restore health. The game includes several accessories that provide the player with a stat increase when worn. The game features a variety of areas, as well as many bosses, which respawn every in-game day.

== Plot ==
Peace is shattered after a Calamity unleashed a horde of dangerous monsters, who ruled the land one hundred years ago but was vanquished by a group of heroes, returns. A cat named Nyanza (or Nyan for short) must save everyone. He is sent to Paw Village by the Empire to protect it. Accompanied by a small creature named Macaron, they make their way to the village and rescue a bunny girl named Erin along the way. However, Alby, the village's sage and old friend of Nyan’s grandfather Payne, is distrustful of them due to his issues towards the Empire, but nevertheless hands them a magic spell book. Nyan then moves into a farm in the village and begins his search for ancient relics hidden in the area to help protect the villagers. Eventually, the Empire has a fortress named Rivero send its forces to help protect the village from the upcoming Calamity.

After defeating a golem blocking a cave entrance, Commander Hazel, a soldier for the Rivero Fortress, who is also accompanied by Jet, a similar creature like Macaron, becomes determined to get the relics before Nyan does to complete her own mission. After winning Alby's trust, he explains why he hates the Empire. It is later revealed that Jet is Macaron's cousin, who challenges them for the relic that they found. After defeating the monster that Jet summoned, they go to inform Alby about Jet. They attempt to obtain the last relic only to find that Jet has already taken it. They confront Jet and Hazel, who demands that they hand over the relics as she believes that they are dangerous to use. Refusing to do so, they fight Hazel and manage to defeat her. She and Jet then make their escape. Nyan and Macaron meet up with Alby and hand over the relics. Jet and Hazel later reveal the truth behind their actions, and that Jet and Macaron were both assigned to be Nyan and Hazel's guardians. Hazel also reveals that Alby is her grandfather, and that he intends to harness the relic’s powers for himself. Releasing that they have been duped, Nyan and Macaron confront Alby, who intends to banish the Empire as revenge for destroying his life and for the murder of Payne. Although they manage to defeat Alby, he refuses to admit defeat, but the spirit of Payne appears and convinces him to let go of his desire for revenge. Alby then decides to leave to redeem himself, but promises to one day return. Although the relics have disappeared, Nyan and Hazel continue their duties of protecting the village.

== Reception ==
Kitaria Fables received a 69/100 aggregate score on the review aggregation website Metacritic, indicating "mixed or average reviews". Screen Rant gave the game a 2.5 out of 5. Kate Gray of Nintendo Life rated it 7.6 out of 10, positively comparing the game to Fantasy Life for the Nintendo 3DS. Others have compared it to Stardew Valley and Rune Factory. In his review for Push Square, Robert Ramsey praised the game's soundtrack and addictive gameplay, giving it a 7 out of 10. The game also garnered a large amount of praise from Jeremy Peeples of Hardcore Gamer.
