= The Official Stardew Valley Cookbook =

2024 cookbook

- Author: ConcernedApe; Ryan Novak
- Illustrator: Kari Fry
- Cover artist: Kari Fry
- Language: English
- Genre: Cookbook
- Publisher: Random House Worlds
- Publication date: May 14, 2024
- Publication place: United States
- Media type: Print
- Pages: 192
- ISBN: 9781984862051

The Official Stardew Valley Cookbook is a cookbook written by Eric "ConcernedApe" Barone and Ryan Novak and published by Random House Worlds on May 14, 2024. The book is based on dishes from Barone's 2016 video game Stardew Valley.

== Summary ==
The Official Stardew Valley Cookbook consists of 74 recipes from Stardew Valley, and these selections are divided into seasons. Based on in-game food, the book offers options ranging from farmed foods to foraged mushrooms, berries, and fresh fish. Creator Eric Barone stated that when creating the book, he wanted to bring the theme and atmosphere of the game into the book and make people feel like they were living in Stardew Valley.

== Reception ==
Polygon's Ana Diaz praised the book's juxtaposition of food with Stardew Valley characters.

== See also ==
- Stardew Valley: The Board Game
- Stardew Valley: Festival of Seasons
- Stardew Valley Guidebook
- Stardew Valley: Original Soundtrack
- Stardew Valley: Symphony of Seasons
