= Stardew Valley: The Board Game =

Board game based on the video game Stardew Valley

- Designers: Eric Barone; Cole Medeiros
- Publishers: ConcernedApe
- Publication: 2021
- Players: 1-4
- Playing time: 45–200 minutes
- Age range: 13+

Stardew Valley: The Board Game is a board game based on the video game Stardew Valley, designed by Eric Barone and Cole Medeiros and published by ConcernedApe. Released in 2021, the game follows the plot of the video game. It is a cooperative game that allows up to four players, including the option to play alone.

The game was developed over 2 and a half years, with ConcernedApe acting as the publisher for the entire length of the project. A large aspect of the design philosophy for the game was the capture the 'essence' of the video game.

== Gameplay ==
Stardew Valley: The Board Game's objective is to rebuild the community centre (by completing community centre room bundles) and to complete grandpa's goals (represented by cards with tasks on them). The game usually takes 45–200 minutes to complete and can be played with 1-4 players, with difficulty increasing with the number of players due to the amount of items needed to complete objectives increasing with each additional player. The game runs over a full year, split into four seasons, and the objectives must be completed before the end of the year (last day of winter) in order to win.

Players take turns choosing a profession for themselves at the beginning of the game. They then choose which tool they want and receive all the tool cards associated with that tool. Each player, in turn chooses which location to start at in the game. Players have a player board allowing them to store items, and see their profession/tools powers and abilities. Each turn, an additional day of the current season (represented with a card) is played, its rules followed, and then that 'day' in the season is played by all players in a cooperative fashion. Players can take various different actions on their turn, with the primary goal being to complete bundles or goals. Items can be gained in similar ways to the video game, such as via fishing and foraging. When a new season begins, the board is cleared and reset for the new season, meaning new season specific items (such as crops or forgeable items) become available whereas previous seasons items not yet gathered are lost.

The game has two primary currencies, coins (used to buy items) and hearts (used to befriend villagers to gain perks). Both currencies are also used in completing either goals or bundles.

== Reception ==
IGN's Matt Thrower praised the game, stating that it was "packed with cute artwork and a satisfying sense of building from scratch." Polygon's Petrana Radulovic found Stardew Valley's board game very good, stating that the game was random and more challenging than the video game. As of November 2026 it has a 7.4 rating on BoardGameGeek.

== See also ==
- The Official Stardew Valley Cookbook
- Stardew Valley: Festival of Seasons
- Stardew Valley Guidebook
- Stardew Valley: Original Soundtrack
- Stardew Valley: Symphony of Seasons
