= Harvest moon (disambiguation) =

A Harvest moon is the full moon closest to the autumnal equinox.

Harvest moon may also refer to:

== Arts and entertainment ==
=== Film and television ===
- The Harvest Moon, a 1920 American silent drama film

=== Music ===
- Harvest Moon (album), 1992, by Neil Young
  - "Harvest Moon" (Neil Young song)
- Harvest Moon, a 2013 album by 2Yoon, or the title track
- "Harvest Moon", a song by Blue Öyster Cult from the 1998 album Heaven Forbid
- "Shine On, Harvest Moon", an early-1900s vaudeville song
- "Harvest Moon (for Dallas)", a song by The Magic Lantern from the 2020 single "The Life That I Have"

=== Gaming ===
- Story of Seasons, a farm life simulation series branded as Harvest Moon in English from 1996 to 2013
  - Harvest Moon (video game), the first game in the series, released in 1996 for the Super Nintendo
- Harvest Moon (2014 video game series), a farm life simulation series separate from the Story of Seasons series

== Other uses ==
- Mid-Autumn Festival, also known as the Harvest Moon Festival
- Harvest Moon Benefit Festival, an annual concert series in Cincinnati, Ohio
- Harvest Moon, a variety of Blue Moon beer
- Operation Harvest Moon, a 1965 Vietnam War operation
- Project Harvest Moon, an Apollo-era proposal for commercialization of the Moon
- USS Harvest Moon (1863), a Union gunboat in the American Civil War
