= Stardew Valley: Symphony of Seasons =

Concert series featuring music from Stardew Valley

- Location: US & Mexico; Canada; Oceania; Europe; Asia
- Associated album: Stardew Valley (Original Game Soundtrack)
- Start date: August 29, 2025
- End date: October 25, 2026
- Legs: 2
- Website: www.stardewvalleyconcert.com

concert chronology
- Stardew Valley: Festival of Seasons (2024–2026); Stardew Valley: Symphony of Seasons (2025–2026)

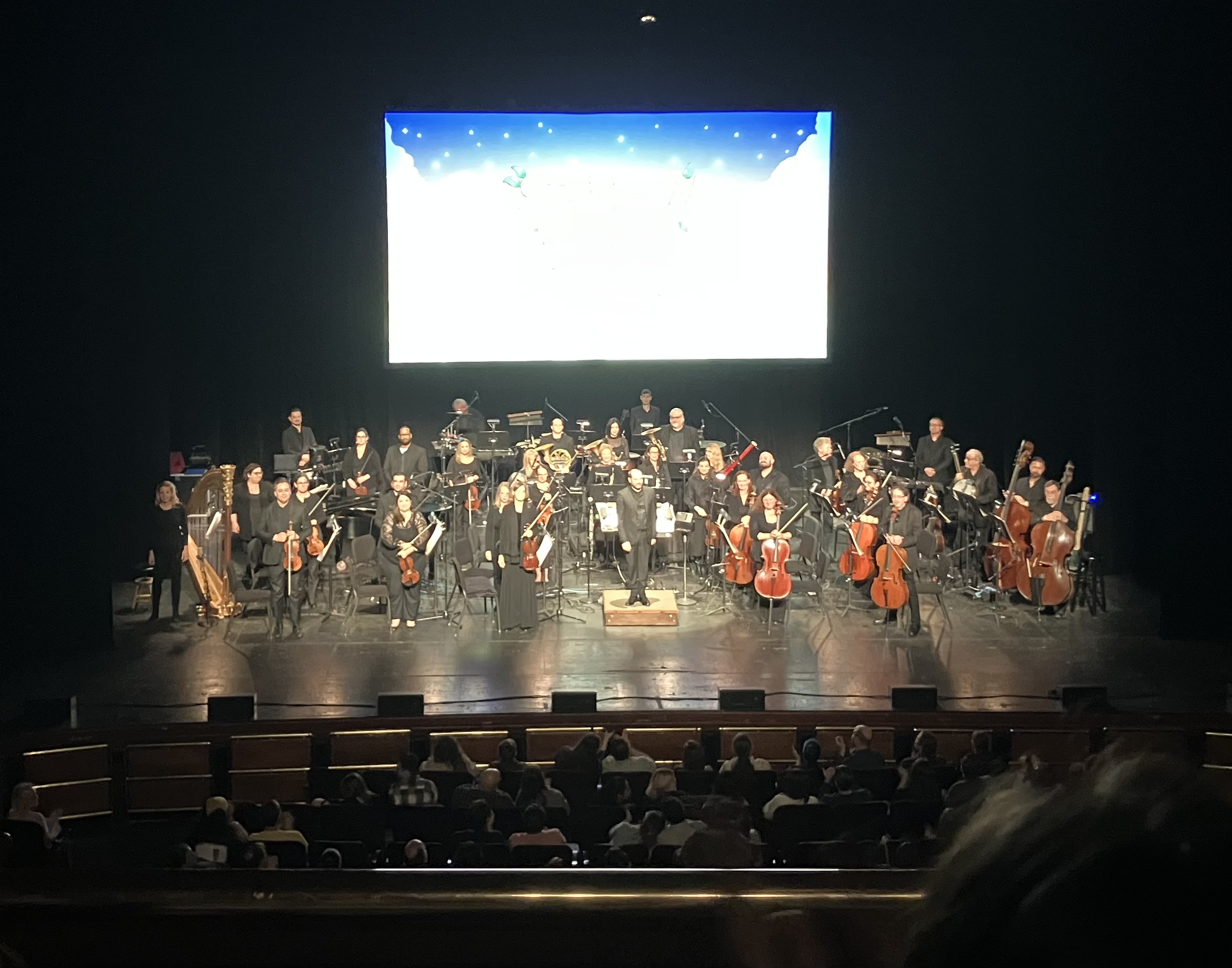
Concert at Benedum Center in Pittsburgh, United States, 2026

Stardew Valley: Symphony of Seasons is the second concert tour featuring music from the video game Stardew Valley. The concert tour, which will feature a 35-piece orchestra, will feature new arrangements of the music, as well as in-game footage from a screen above the stage and specially created original content. The concert tour, announced on November 20, 2024, began on August 29, 2025 in Seattle and concluded on March 21, 2026 in Hawaii.

The tour is produced by ConcernedApe and SOHO Live.

== Tour dates ==
List of 2025 concerts, showing date, city, country, venue
Date (2025)	City	Country	Venue
August 29	Seattle	United States	Benaroya Hall
August 30	Seattle	United States	Benaroya Hall
August 31 (Note: This date has two showings, an afternoon and an evening show.)	Seattle	United States	Benaroya Hall
September 3	Spokane	United States	First Interstate Center for the Arts
September 5	Calgary	Canada	Southern Alberta Jubilee Auditorium
September 6 (Note: This date has two showings, an afternoon and an evening show.)	Portland	United States	Arlene Schnitzer Concert Hall
September 8	Vancouver	Canada	Orpheum
September 9	Vancouver	Canada	Orpheum
September 12	San Jose	United States	San Jose Civic
September 13	Denver	United States	Ellie Caulkins Opera House
September 13	Los Angeles	United States	Greek Theatre
September 14	Los Angeles	United States	Greek Theatre
September 16	Oakland	United States	Paramount Theatre
September 19	Omaha	United States	Orpheum Theatre
September 20	Grand Prairie (Note: Labelled as Dallas in promotion material.)	United States	Texas Trust CU Theatre
September 21	Austin	United States	Moody Theater
September 25	Macon	United States	Macon City Auditorium
September 27	Orlando	United States	Dr. Phillips Center
September 28	Fort Lauderdale	United States	Au-Rene Theater
September 28	Singapore		Esplanade – Theatres on the Bay
October 1	Reading	United States	Santander Performing Arts Center
October 2	Philadelphia	United States	Marian Anderson Hall
October 3 (Note: This date has two showings, an afternoon and an evening show.)	Washington, D.C.	United States	The Anthem
October 4 (Note: This date has two showings, an afternoon and an evening show.)	Newark	United States	New Jersey Performing Arts Center
October 5 & 7	Boston	United States	Boch Center
October 7 (Note: Two shows a day in Shenzhen.)	Boston	United States	Boch Center
October 7	Columbus	United States	Palace Theatre
October 7	Shenzhen	China	Shenzhen Poly Theater
October 10	Milwaukee	United States	Riverside Theater
October 11 (Note: Two shows a day in Chicago and Toronto.)	Chicago	United States	Chicago Theatre
October 11	Guangzhou	China	Zhongshan Memorial Hall
October 11	Toronto	Canada	Roy Thomson Hall
October 12 (Note: Two shows a day in Montreal.)	Montreal	Canada	Théâtre Saint-Denis
October 12	Cleveland	United States	Cleveland Masonic Temple
October 14	Toronto	Canada	Meridian Hall
October 15	Detroit	United States	Fisher Theatre
October 16	Durham	United States	Durham Performing Arts Center
October 17	Durham	United States	Durham Performing Arts Center
October 18 (Note: Two shows a day in Ottawa.)	St. Louis	United States	The Factory
October 18	Ottawa	Canada	National Arts Centre
October 19 (Note: This date has two showings, an afternoon and an evening show.)	Indianapolis	United States	Clowes Memorial Hall
October 21	Buffalo	United States	Shea's Performing Arts Center
October 22	Christchurch	New Zealand	Christchurch Town Hall
October 23	Knoxville	United States	Knoxville Civic Auditorium
October 24	Wellington	New Zealand	Michael Fowler Centre
October 25 (Note: Two shows a day in Minneapolis.)	Auckland	New Zealand	Aotea Centre
October 25	Minneapolis	United States	Orpheum Theatre
October 26	Louisville	United States	The Kentucky Center
October 29	Richmond	United States	Altria Theater
October 30	Albany	United States	Palace Theatre
October 30	Beijing	China	Forbidden City Concert Hall
October 31	Beijing	China	Forbidden City Concert Hall
November 1 (Note: Two shows a day in Mesa.)	Mesa	United States	Mesa Arts Center
November 1	Brisbane	Australia	Brisbane Convention & Exhibition Centre
November 2	Sugar Land (Note: Labelled as Houston in promotion material.)	United States	Smart Financial Centre
November 2	Kansas City	United States	Muriel Kauffman Theatre
November 3	Perth	Australia	Riverside Theatre
November 5	Adelaide	Australia	Adelaide Entertainment Centre
November 5	Atlanta	United States	Fox Theatre
November 7	New Orleans	United States	Saenger Theatre
November 8	Tampa	United States	Carol Morsani Hall
November 9	Jacksonville	United States	Florida Theatre
November 12	Grand Rapids	United States	DeVos Performance Hall
November 14	Melbourne	Australia	Melbourne Convention and Exhibition Centre
November 15	Sydney	Australia	ICC Sydney Theatre
November 15	Bangkok	Thailand	Prince Mahidol Hall
November 25	Shanghai	China	West Bund Grand Theatre
November 26	Shanghai	China	West Bund Grand Theatre
December 20	Seoul	South Korea	Donghae Arts Center

List of 2026 concerts, showing date, city, country, venue
Date (2026)	City	Country	Venue
January 9	Yokohama	Japan	Minato Mirai Hall
January 16	Saskatoon	Canada	TCU Place
January 25 (Note: Two shows a day in Rotterdam.)	Winnipeg	Canada	Centennial Concert Hall
January 25	Rotterdam	Netherlands	De Doelen
January 27	Antwerp	Belgium	Stadsschouwburg Antwerp
January 27	Salt Lake City	United States	Eccles Theater
January 28	Hamburg	Germany	Alsterdorfer Sporthalle
January 29	Tucson	United States	Linda Ronstadt Music Hall
January 29	Mobile	United States	Saenger Theatre
January 30	Linz	Austria	Brucknerhaus
January 31	Zürich	Switerzerland	The Hall
January 31	Mexico City	Mexico	Teatro Metropólitan
February 2	Munich	Germany	Zenith
February 3	Berlin	Germany	Tempodrom
February 3	San Antonio	United States	Majestic Theatre
February 4	Tulsa	United States	Tulsa Theater
February 5	Oklahoma City	United States	The Criterion
February 5	Paris	France	Grand Rex
February 6	Düsseldorf	Germany	Mitsubishi Electric Halle
February 6	Charlotte	United States	Ovens Auditorium
February 7	Peoria	United States	Peoria Civic Center
February 9	Glasgow	Scotland	Glasgow Royal Concert Hall
February 10	Glasgow	Scotland	Glasgow Royal Concert Hall
February 11	Manchester	England	O_{2} Apollo Manchester
February 12	Manchester	England	O_{2} Apollo Manchester
February 14 (Note: This date has two showings, an afternoon and an evening show.)	London	England	Eventim Apollo
February 19	Rochester	United States	Kodak Center
February 22	Syracuse	United States	Oncenter
February 24	Providence	United States	Providence Performing Arts Center
February 27	Waterbury	United States	Palace Theater
February 28	Norfolk	United States	Chartway Arena
March 2	Salem	United States	Salem Civic Center
March 4	Cleveland	United States	Playhouse Square
March 8	Pittsburgh	United States	Benedum Center
March 8	Dublin	Ireland	Bord Gáis Energy Theatre
March 14	Nashville	United States	Tennessee Performing Arts Center
March 21	Honolulu	United States	Hawaii Theatre
October 25	Morrison	United States	Red Rocks Amphitheatre

== See also ==
- Stardew Valley: The Board Game
- The Official Stardew Valley Cookbook
- Stardew Valley Guidebook
- Stardew Valley: Original Soundtrack
- Stardew Valley: Festival of Seasons
