= Eric Barone =

American video game designer (born 1987)

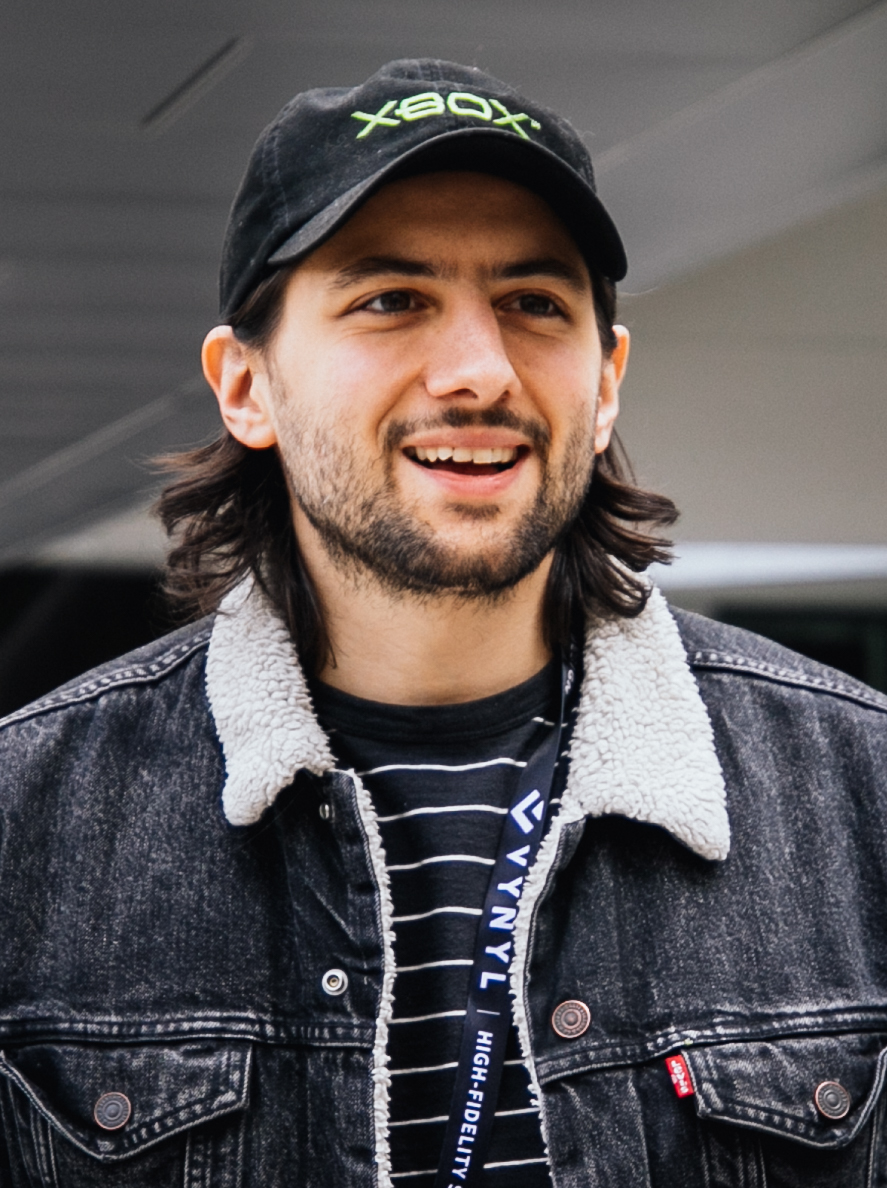
- Barone in 2019
- Born: Eric Lorenz Barone; December 3, 1987 (age 38); Los Angeles, California, U.S.
- Other name: ConcernedApe
- Citizenship: American
- Education: University of Washington Tacoma
- Occupations: Video game developer; video game designer; composer; musician
- Years active: 2008–present
- Known for: Stardew Valley
- Awards: Golden Joystick Award, Breakthrough Award (2016); Forbes 30 Under 30: Games (2017); University of Washington Tacoma Distinguished Alumni Award (2019)
- Website: concernedape.com

Eric Lorenz Barone (/bəˈroʊni/ bə-ROH-nee, born December 3, 1987), known professionally as ConcernedApe, is an American video game developer, designer, and composer.

Born in Los Angeles, Barone grew up in Auburn, Washington, and studied computer science at the University of Washington Tacoma. After being unable to find work following graduation, he began developing the 2016 farming simulation game Stardew Valley, which he made alone over four and a half years as its designer, programmer, animator, artist, composer, and writer. As of February 2026, the game had sold more than 50 million copies, and critics have credited it with reviving the farming-simulation genre. Barone handled updates to the game himself for several years after its release before recruiting a small team to assist him in 2019, and has continued to support it while developing a second game, Haunted Chocolatier, a shop-management title announced in 2021.

Stardew Valley received favorable reviews and has won and been nominated for industry awards; in July 2025 it became the highest-rated game on Steam according to the user-review aggregator Steam250. Barone received the Breakthrough Award at the 2016 Golden Joystick Awards, and Forbes named him to its "30 Under 30: Games" list in 2017 for his work on the game.

Outside the game itself, Barone has released albums of its music, co-designed a board game adaptation, co-authored an official cookbook, and announced two concert tours based on its soundtrack. He has created Stardew Valley artwork for Balatro and Magic: The Gathering and voiced a character in Hollow Knight: Silksong. He has donated to educational, environmental, and open-source software causes, including his alma mater and the game development framework MonoGame.

== Early life and education ==
Barone was born on December 3, 1987, in Los Angeles, California, and spent his childhood in Auburn, Washington, a city near the Seattle metropolitan area. He has cited the Harvest Moon series as a childhood favorite that continued to influence him into adulthood.

Although he had no formal musical training, Barone played music from a young age and was a member of several bands, including a nu metal band and an experimental pop band. For the experimental pop band's album he created his first video game, a LucasArts-inspired point-and-click game.

Barone graduated from the University of Washington Tacoma in 2011 with a degree in computer science, but did not at first consider game development as a career. Unable to find work after graduating, he began developing Stardew Valley as a way to practice programming in C#, intending to show the finished game to potential employers on his résumé.

== Career ==
=== Early projects (2008–2014) ===
In 2008, Barone released a game, 17CF Quest, a promotional tie-in for the music group 17 Colorful Feathers; its main character later appeared as a piece of furniture in Stardew Valley. In 2011, he created a comic strip series, Wumbus World.

In 2014, during the development of Stardew Valley, Barone took a month-long break to assemble a small mobile game for Android. Titled Air Pear, it was released on March 6, 2014; players guide a purple pear on a hoverboard between obstacles while competing for a high score.

=== Stardew Valley (2012–present) ===
==== Development and release ====
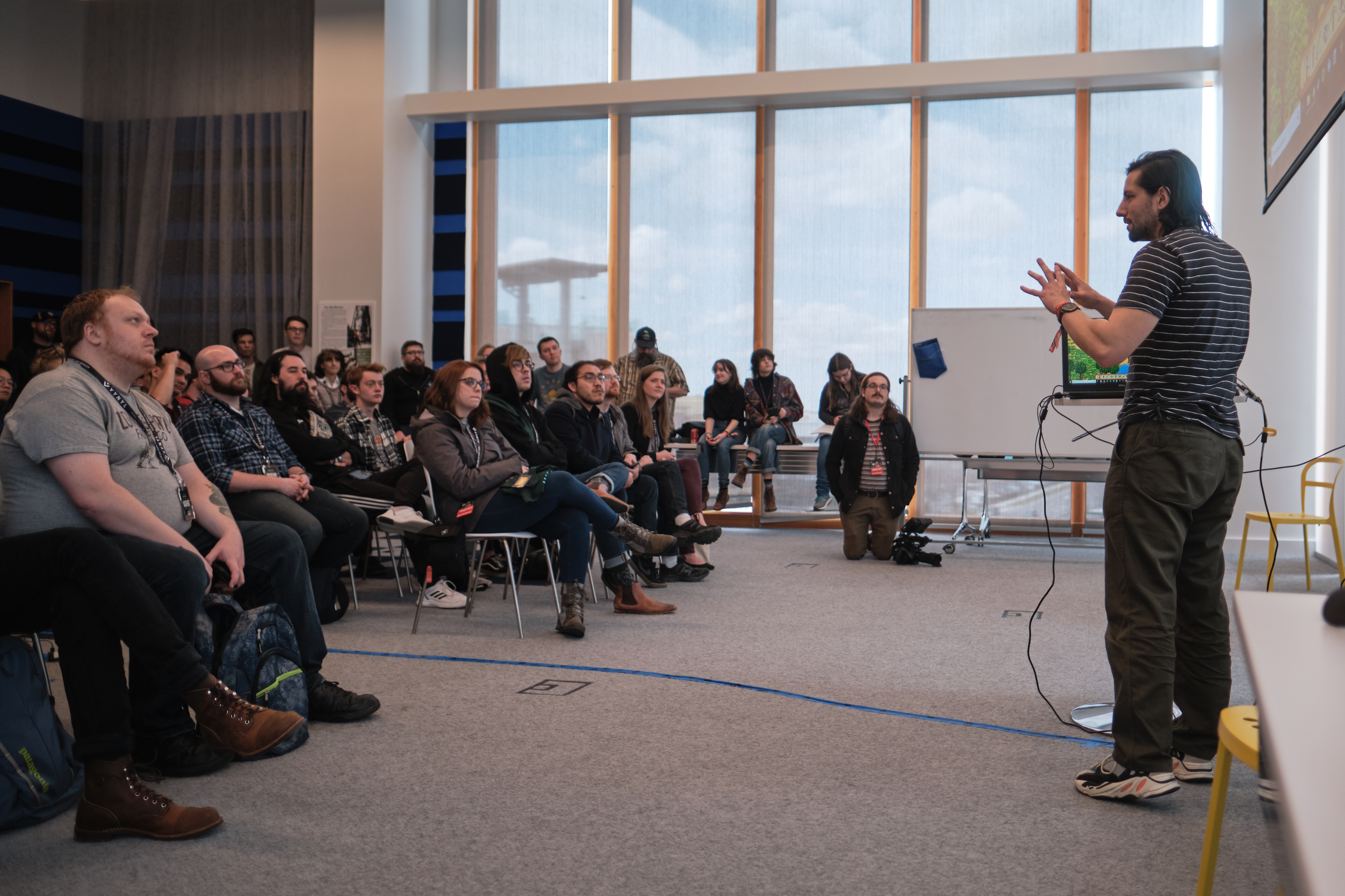
Barone speaking on the development of Stardew Valley at Hackfort 2019

Barone began working on Stardew Valley in 2012 and released it in 2016. He created the game on his own, serving as its designer, programmer, animator, artist, composer, and writer, and worked an average of 10 hours a day, seven days a week, for four and a half years to complete it, a schedule that Game Developer described as self-imposed crunch. During this period he supported himself with part-time work as an evening usher at the Paramount Theatre.

==== Post-release support ====
Barone released the game for PC before porting it to consoles and other platforms. He initially handled updates himself, and has been assisted by a small team since 2019. In 2024, the game received a major content expansion in its 1.6 update.

==== Music and concerts ====
In 2016, Barone released the game's music as the album Stardew Valley: Original Soundtrack. On August 15, 2020, he followed it with Symphonic Tale: The Place I Truly Belong (Music from Stardew Valley), an orchestral album directed by Kentaro Sato and performed by the Budapest Symphony Orchestra.

In May 2021, Barone and Norihiko Hibino released the Stardew Valley installment of Prescription for Sleep, an album series that remixes video game soundtracks with piano and saxophone; it includes one new track, "Beauty in the Seasons". Barone announced two concert tours: Stardew Valley: Festival of Seasons in October 2023, featuring a selection of the game's music performed live by a chamber orchestra, and Stardew Valley: Symphony of Seasons in November 2024, featuring new arrangements of the game's music performed by a 35-piece orchestra.

==== Tabletop, books and crossovers ====
In February 2021, Barone and board game designer Cole Medeiros released Stardew Valley: The Board Game, a cooperative board game adaptation. The first printing sold out, and it returned to sale in November 2021 with revised cards and rules.

Barone co-authored The Official Stardew Valley Cookbook, released on May 14, 2024, which adapts more than 50 recipes from the game. In July 2026, he announced a companion book, The Official Stardew Valley Crochet Book, co-written with Ryan Novak and crochet designer Megan Lapp and scheduled for release by Random House Worlds on January 26, 2027.

In October 2024, the card game Balatro added Stardew Valley collaboration cards in its Friends of Jimbo 2 update, with the card art drawn by Barone. In July 2026, Wizards of the Coast announced a crossover between Stardew Valley and its collectible card game Magic: The Gathering, released as three Secret Lair card sets on July 27, 2026. Barone created original pixel art for the sets, including a new land card themed around the game. (Note: The crossover was unveiled at MagicCon Amsterdam as the Secret Lair series Superdrop of the Moonlight Jellies. Its three sets are Welcome to Stardew Valley, Life in Pelican Town, and A Flicker in the Deep.)

=== Haunted Chocolatier (2021–present) ===
In October 2021, Barone announced that he was developing a new game, Haunted Chocolatier, in which the player runs a chocolate shop. As with Stardew Valley, Barone was developing the game largely on his own; he said in 2021 that almost everything in it, including its combat, was coded and drawn from scratch. The game places a greater emphasis on combat than Stardew Valley did. He continued to release updates for Stardew Valley while working on the new game.

=== Later projects (2022–present) ===
Barone meeting fans at Hackfort 2019

In 2022, Barone animated a music video for "Many Mirrors" by the indie pop band Alvvays, his first work in 3D animation.

In 2025, Barone voiced a character in Hollow Knight: Silksong.

== Reception and legacy ==
=== Critical reception ===
Stardew Valley received favorable reviews on release. As of July 2026, the PC version holds a score of 89 out of 100 on Metacritic, based on 30 critic reviews, which the site classifies as "generally favorable". At the same date, OpenCritic rated it "Mighty", with an average score of 90 across 76 critic reviews and a recommendation from 99 percent of critics, placing it in the top one percent of games tracked by the site. In 2019, GamesRadar+ included the game among those that defined the 2010s, praising its ability to draw players in over hundreds of hours. GamesIndustry.biz named the game one of its Games of the Year for 2024, following the release of its 1.6 update. In July 2025, it became the highest-rated game on Steam according to the user-review aggregator Steam250, displacing Portal 2, which had held the top position for 14 years.

=== Commercial reception ===
As of February 2026, Stardew Valley had sold more than 50 million copies. By the game's tenth anniversary that month, its sales had surpassed those of the best-selling individual entries in franchises such as Pokémon, The Legend of Zelda, and Call of Duty.

=== Influence on the farming-simulation genre ===
Barone at PAX West 2016, the year Stardew Valley was released

Inverse and Destructoid both credited Stardew Valley with reviving the farming-simulation genre and bringing cozy games to wider audiences, more than two decades after the Harvest Moon series established the genre. Writing for Digital Trends, Tomas Franzese argued that although the original Harvest Moon games established the farming simulation format, Stardew Valley became the standard against which later entries in the genre, including newer Harvest Moon and Story of Seasons titles, are measured. PC Gamer writers Wes Fenlon and Kara Phillips similarly described the game as the foundation of the modern farming simulation genre, noting that new releases in the genre are routinely compared to it; they pointed to titles such as Disney Dreamlight Valley and Coral Island as among the games that followed in its wake. Barone has said that he has not played many other farming and life simulation games, while noting that Stardew Valley appears to have inspired more people to consider making them.

Yasuhiro Wada, the creator of Harvest Moon, said in a 2016 interview with GameSpot that Stardew Valley carries on the legacy of the original Harvest Moon because of the freedom it gives players.

== Awards and honors ==
Barone received the Breakthrough Award at the 2016 Golden Joystick Awards. In December 2016, Gamasutra named him one of its ten best game developers of the year, crediting him with single-handedly reinvigorating a genre long dominated by the Story of Seasons series. That year, PC Gamer gave Stardew Valley its "Spirit of the PC" award, calling it a heartwarming technical achievement given that its sole developer handled the design, coding, art, and music himself.

In 2017, Forbes included Barone in its "30 Under 30: Games" list for his work on Stardew Valley. That year, Stardew Valley was also the first winner of the Dr. Mark Award, given by the mental health nonprofit Take This for the portrayal of mental health in video games. He received the University of Washington Tacoma's Distinguished Alumni Award in 2019.

Among the industry awards the game has received for Barone's work, it won Best Simulation Game from Game Informer, Game, Simulation at the NAVGTR Awards, and Best Ongoing Game at the 2024 PC Gamer Game of the Year Awards. It was also nominated at The Game Awards, the Game Developers Choice Awards, the Independent Games Festival, and the British Academy Games Awards. The game's awards and nominations are listed below:

Year	Award	Category	Result	Ref.
2012	IndieDB Indie of the Year Awards	Best Upcoming Indie Game	Won	
2016	Golden Joystick Awards	Best Indie Game	Nominated	
2016	Golden Joystick Awards	PC Game of the Year	Nominated	
2016	Golden Joystick Awards	Breakthrough Award	Won	
2016	The Game Awards 2016	Best Independent Game	Nominated	
2016	17th Game Developers Choice Awards	Best Debut	Nominated	
2016	Independent Games Festival	Seumas McNally Grand Prize	Nominated	
2016	Independent Games Festival	Excellence in Narrative	Honorable mention	
2016	SXSW Gaming Awards	Most Promising New Intellectual Property	Nominated	
2016	13th British Academy Games Awards	Best Game	Nominated	
2016	Game Informer Best of 2016	Best Simulation Game	Won	
2016	Game Informer Reader's Choice Best of 2016	Best Simulation	Won	
2016	PlayStation Blog Game of the Year Awards	Best Independent Game	Bronze	
2016	RPG Site Awards	Best RPG from an Independent Studio	Won	
2016	NAVGTR Awards	Game of the Year	Nominated	
2016	NAVGTR Awards	Game, Simulation	Won	
2016	NAVGTR Awards	Original Light Mix Score, New IP	Nominated	
2016	The Steam Awards	The 'Best Use Of A Farm Animal' Award	Nominated	
2016	The Steam Awards	The 'I Thought This Game Was Cool Before It Won An Award' Award	Nominated	
2017	The Steam Awards	'The World Is Grim Enough Let's Just All Get Along' Award	Won	
2018	The Steam Awards	Labor of Love	Nominated	
2024	PC Gamer Game of the Year Awards	Best Ongoing Game	Won	
2024	The Steam Awards	Labor of Love	Nominated	
2024	Equinox LATAM Game Awards	Best Ongoing Game	Won	
2024	IGN Awards	Best Live Service Game	Nominated	

== Personal life ==
While developing Stardew Valley, Barone moved from his parents' home to Capitol Hill, Seattle, with his girlfriend, Amber Hageman, who worked two jobs to support them.

In a November 2024 interview, Barone said that he was a member of a Seattle-based steelpan band.

== Philanthropy ==
In May 2021, Barone funded upgrades to the Giving Garden on the University of Washington Tacoma campus, including watering systems and a greenhouse, and his donations established a paid student coordinator position; according to the university's 2021 report, the garden donates more than 200 pounds (91 kg) of food each year. In 2024, he was listed as a donor of at least $25,000 to the Mountains to Sound Greenway Trust, a 501(c)(3) nonprofit that works to conserve the 1,500,000-acre (6,100 km^{2}) corridor running from Seattle to Ellensburg along Interstate 90. In December 2025, MonoGame, the C# framework Stardew Valley uses, announced that Barone had supported the project with an initial donation of $125,000 and a commitment to donate $1,250 monthly.

== Works ==
=== Video games ===
Year	Title	Role	Notes	Ref.
2008	17CF Quest	Creator	Promotional tie-in for the music group 17 Colorful Feathers	
2014	Air Pear	Creator	Android mobile game	
2016	Stardew Valley	Sole designer, programmer, animator, artist, composer, writer	Farm life simulation game	
TBA	Haunted Chocolatier	Creator	In development	

==== Other credits ====
Year	Title	Role	Notes	Ref.
2021	Stardew Valley: The Board Game	Co-designer	Tabletop adaptation of Stardew Valley, designed with Cole Medeiros	
2024	Balatro	Artist	Card art for the Stardew Valley collaboration in the Friends of Jimbo 2 update	
2025	Hollow Knight: Silksong	Voice performer		
2026	Magic: The Gathering	Artist	Secret Lair series Superdrop of the Moonlight Jellies	

=== Music ===
Year	Title	Role	Notes	Ref.
2016	Stardew Valley: Original Soundtrack	Composer	Original soundtrack album for Stardew Valley	
2020	Symphonic Tale: The Place I Truly Belong (Music from Stardew Valley)	Source composer	Orchestral album directed by Kentaro Sato and performed by the Budapest Symphony Orchestra	
2021	Prescription for Sleep: Stardew Valley	Composer	Collaboration with Norihiko Hibino; includes new track "Beauty in the Seasons"	
2023	Stardew Valley: Festival of Seasons	Source composer	Concert tour announced in October 2023; selection of the game's music performed by a chamber orchestra	
2024	Stardew Valley: Symphony of Seasons	Source composer	Concert tour announced in November 2024; new arrangements performed by a 35-piece orchestra	

=== Literature ===
Year	Title	Role	Notes	Ref.
2011	Wumbus World	Creator	Comic strip series	
2024	The Official Stardew Valley Cookbook	Co-author	More than 50 recipes adapted from in-game recipes	
2027	The Official Stardew Valley Crochet Book	Co-author	Written with Ryan Novak and crochet designer Megan Lapp; scheduled for release January 26, 2027	
