= Harvestella =

- Developer: Live Wire
- Publisher: Square Enix
- Director: Hiroto Furuya
- Producer: Daisuke Taka
- Designer: Daisuke Taka
- Programmer: Nauyuki Ukeda
- Artists: Isamu Kamikokuryo; Yoichi Kubo; Yasushi Hasegawa
- Writer: Hiroto Furuya
- Composer: Go Shiina
- Engine: Unreal Engine 4
- Platforms: Nintendo Switch, Windows
- Release: November 4, 2022
- Genres: Role-playing; Farm life sim
- Mode: Single-player

Harvestella is a 2022 farm life sim role-playing video game developed by Live Wire and published by Square Enix. It was released for the Nintendo Switch and Windows on November 4. It has been compared to Final Fantasy and Rune Factory, and revolves around farming crops while attempting to save the world from the sudden appearance of a deadly magical plague known as Quietus.

== Gameplay ==
The game includes action RPG combat, with the player being able to choose one of twelve classes, including Fighter, Mage and Shadow Walker. Other gameplay aspects include life simulation elements, where players can explore their village and talk to its residents, farming, cooking, crafting and fishing. Besides the main story, each of the main characters have ten missions that the player must complete to strengthen their relationship with them, but they don't have to be done right away. There are also side missions that the player can do anytime. Both the character and side missions can be done by talking to a character with a symbol above them. The missions will not continue until the player receives letters from the characters, requesting them to come see them. They can also be done even after the main story is finished. Should the player successfully bond with one of the main characters, it could result in a marriage. During combat, players can have up to two of the main characters to help them in battle. Some characters may leave the party temporarily.

== Plot ==
The protagonist walks through a desolate town undergoing a phenomenon known as "Quietus" and is greeted by an angelic being. They wake up later, having been found by a woman named Cres, and are in an amnesiac state. Cres takes the protagonist to a nearby village she lives in called "Lethe" and, as a physician, treats them. Cres reveals that the protagonist was exposed to the dust of Quietus, which typically causes terminal illness in all living things that breathe in a sufficient quantity. She is shocked to see that the protagonist is otherwise healthy. The protagonist is released eventually and decides to figure out what to do while they work on figuring out their past. The civilians at Lethe village end up befriending the protagonist, who does work around the village and starts their own farm.

Later on, an earthquake occurs and a giant red crystal referred to as the "Seaslight" begins releasing energy. Several other Seaslight crystals also release their energy, and a meteor falls from the sky. The meteor turns out to be a futuristic ship, and an armored being is found within. Cres refers to the armored being as an "Omen" and shows great disdain towards them. The protagonist, however, decides to help the armored being despite the protests of Cres.

The protagonist sleeps next to the armored being, whose armor dematerializes at night, revealing a young red-haired woman who refers to herself as Aria. Aria reveals that she is a scientist from the future; however, everyone else is suspicious. Aria convinces the protagonist to go exploring with her, and they run into an Omen named Dianthus. The group explore the world and try to reach the different Seaslights to understand why they are becoming unstable and creating longer periods of Quietus.

On their journey, they run into a number of people who join their team after assisting them in their situations. These members include Shrika, a missionary; Heine, a flirtatious and handsome mechanic; Emo, a siren princess and the last of her kind; Istina, a teacher who was once an assassin; Asyl, a spearman; and Brakka, a mercenary. As the party continues finding Seaslights and stabilizing them, they eventually run into an antagonistic Omen known as "Geist". Geist explains that he intends to wipe out humanity as the lifeforms on the planet are preventing a different set of lifeforms who are very similar and in stasis from colonizing the planet successfully, and kidnaps Aria to have her help carry out his plot.

The protagonist manages to rescue Aria and defeat Geist, but he in turn leads them to the truth behind his actions before shutting down and rebooting, becoming an ally. Their quest soon leads them to a space station floating in orbit above the planet, where a fifth Seaslight called the Proto Seaslight and humans who are in stasis reside. Later, Geist reveals that the Omens are the ones who created the world they are on now; the Seaslights are also their creations. Aria's purpose is to act as the harbinger and use the Proto to either massacre all the "Abels" on ReGaia so that the "Cains" from the planet Earth (which by now is referred to as "Lost Gaia") can take it over or massacre the Cains and spare the Abels.

Aria's past is revealed, and it is shown that a red Seaslight fell on Earth long ago and triggered Quietus, leading to the planet becoming uninhabitable. Due to this, the Cains sent a portion of their surviving population to colonize a distant planet called ReGaia that was similar to Earth (the world that the protagonist lives on), implied to be Earth's moon terraformed by the Omens, but they soon went into stasis and had the Omen take over with the project. But because the Abels were born on the planet, they had to choose between saving one of the species. Aria herself is one of the Cains and she is really from the past, not the future.

Deciding to save her own people, Aria betrays the team and falls under an evil influence, transforming her into her alternate persona: Harbinger Aria. The protagonist is forced to fight her and bring her back to her senses by entering her consciousness and freeing her heart from her self doubts within, convincing her that murdering innocent people to save her kind isn't right. After Aria is freed from her evil persona, she re-allies with the protagonist in turn, deciding to instead find another solution that will save both species instead of sacrificing one. In response, Geist, who knew that this would happen, tries to have the protagonist decide which species to save (selecting one of these choices will lead to a bad ending), but they resist choosing and instead desire to save both by putting a stop to Quietus, which was at first believed to be impossible. However, the project to save either the Cains or the Abels goes haywire after the Proto, revealed to be sentient and having plans of its own, reprograms it to destroy both species, but Aria and the protagonist manage to prevent this by making it crash into the northern ocean instead. Aria at first considers sacrificing herself for her earlier misdeeds, but the protagonist rescues her.

In the game's true ending, the protagonist resolves to save both the Cains and the Abels from extinction. The group gain access to Geist's room, which unlocked due to the protagonist refusing Geist's project. Inside, they meet a robot named Geist MK-II, who reveals the truth behind Geist's previous actions while urging the protagonist to maintain their strong will after seeing their determination driving them to defy logic so to find a more peaceful outcome by doing the impossible. Gaining entry to Earth's core, they discover that an artificial intelligence girl named Gaia is the one who caused Quietus and is heavily implied to be responsible for corrupting Geist and Aria and reprograming Geist's project. The protagonist defeats Gaia with the help of her counterpart ReGaia, the being from the beginning of the story. Quietus is permanently resolved, ReGaia reveals a surprising truth to the protagonist (should the player want to know), and the main characters live their lives out normally. In the aftermath, the protagonist and their friends join Aria, who is now the Omens' leader, in an investigation on Earth.

== Reception ==
Reception

Aggregate score
| Aggregator | Score |
|---|---|
| Metacritic | NS: 73/100; PC: 74/100 |

Review scores
| Publication | Score |
|---|---|
| Destructoid | 7.5/10 |
| Game Informer | 6.75/10 |
| Hardcore Gamer | 3.5/5 |
| HobbyConsolas | 78/100 |
| Nintendo Life | 7/10 |
| Nintendo World Report | 7.5/10 |
| RPGamer | 4/5 |
| RPGFan | 85% |
| Screen Rant | 3.5/5 |

Harvestella received "mixed or average" reviews according to the review aggregator Metacritic. Jonathan Bolding of PC Gamer called the game "Square Enix's answer to Rune Factory", saying that it had a "distinctive spin and visual style". Cass Marshall of Polygon called it "an intriguing take on a chill vibes genre of game", and calling its fully 3D graphics an "interesting perspective".
