= Stardew Valley (soundtrack) =

Stardew Valley: Original Soundtrack

Soundtrack album by Eric Barone
- Released: September 19, 2016
- Recorded: Seattle, 2012 – 2016
- Genres: Video game soundtrack, ambient, country
- Length: 175:05
- Label: Fangamer
- Producer: Eric Barone

Stardew Valley: Original Soundtrack is the soundtrack of video game music from Stardew Valley. The music was composed by Eric Barone and released by Fangamer. The soundtrack was released on September 19, 2016, and was later released on iTunes.

== Development and recording ==
Eric Barone, who composed the soundtrack with Reason Studios and has no formal musical training, said that everything was intuitive and depended on how the seasons felt and how that translated into the sound. Barone, who uses his own method for developing the game, said he first creates the music, then animates the scenes and scenarios and transfers them to the game. Barone calls this "music-guided game development". Eric Barone stated that he created the sound effects with synthesizers and that he created some of the sounds from natural sounds.

Stardew Valley, which has ambient music as a genre, also has country music.

== Release ==
Stardew Valley: Original Soundtrack was released as a CD album, digital download and made available for streaming . A Complete Vinyl Soundtrack Box Set of the game was released by Fangamer in December 2020.

== Reception ==
Stardew Valley soundtrack received very positive reviews. Polygon's Nicole Clark found the game's soundtrack relaxing. Polygon's Petrana Radulovic said the game's soundtrack "slaps". The Guardian said it "upscaled the music along with the graphics, making it more orchestral and realistic", while retaining some of that video game feel in the synths and digital voices that permeate the soundscape. PC Gamer's Elie Gould praised the soundtrack, noting that Barone had no formal musical training.

== Different versions ==
On August 15, 2020, the orchestral album Symphonic Tale: The Place I Truly Belong (Music from Stardew Valley) directed by Kentaro Sato and performed by the Budapest Symphony Orchestra was released. ConcernedApe collaborated with Norihiko Hibino on an album series Prescription for Sleep. The series remixes video game soundtracks with piano and saxophone. The Prescription for Sleep: Stardew Valley album was released in May 2021. It includes 10 tracks from the game's original soundtrack and one new track called "Beauty in the Seasons". ConcernedApe promoted its first Stardew Valley concert tour, Stardew Valley: Festival of Seasons, on October 10, 2023. ConcernedApe has unveiled their second concert tour, Stardew Valley: Symphony of Seasons, on November 20, 2024.

== Track listing ==
| No. | Title | Length |
|---|---|---|
| 1. | "Stardew Valley Overture" | 2:26 |
| 2. | "Cloud Country" | 1:33 |
| 3. | "Grandpa's Theme" | 1:05 |
| 4. | "Settling In" | 1:51 |
| 5. | "Spring (It's A Big World Outside)" | 3:59 |
| 6. | "Spring (The Valley Comes Alive)" | 4:23 |
| 7. | "Spring (Wild Horseradish Jam)" | 4:08 |
| 8. | "Pelican Town" | 2:20 |
| 9. | "Flower Dance" | 0:33 |
| 10. | "Fun Festival" | 2:00 |
| 11. | "Distant Banjo" | 1:55 |
| 12. | "A Glimpse Of The Other World (Wizard's Theme)" | 1:48 |
| 13. | "Summer (Nature's Crescendo)" | 3:31 |
| 14. | "Summer (The Sun Can Bend An Orange Sky)" | 3:41 |
| 15. | "Summer (Tropicala)" | 3:25 |
| 16. | "The Adventure Guild" | 0:53 |
| 17. | "The Stardrop Saloon" | 1:26 |
| 18. | "Luau Festival" | 1:33 |
| 19. | "Dance Of The Moonlight Jellies" | 1:53 |
| 20. | "Fall (The Smell Of Mushroom)" | 3:36 |
| 21. | "Fall (Ghost Synth)" | 2:40 |
| 22. | "Fall (Raven's Descent)" | 2:52 |
| 23. | "The Library and Museum" | 1:51 |
| 24. | "Stardew Valley Fair Theme" | 1:56 |
| 25. | "Festival Game" | 0:55 |
| 26. | "Spirit's Eve Festival" | 2:08 |
| 27. | "Winter (Nocturne Of Ice)" | 3:20 |
| 28. | "Winter (The Wind Can Be Still)" | 2:53 |
| 29. | "Winter (Ancient)" | 3:07 |
| 30. | "Winter Festival" | 1:28 |
| 31. | "A Golden Star Is Born" | 1:59 |
| 32. | "Country Shop" | 1:07 |
| 33. | "Calico Desert" | 2:11 |
| 34. | "Playful" | 0:57 |
| 35. | "Buttercup Melody" | 1:07 |
| 36. | "Pleasant Memory (Penny's Theme)" | 1:03 |
| 37. | "Piano Solo (Elliott's Theme)" | 0:28 |
| 38. | "Land Of Green And Gold (Leah's Theme)" | 1:27 |
| 39. | "A Stillness In The Rain (Abigail's Melody)" | 1:07 |
| 40. | "Starwatcher (Maru's Theme)" | 1:42 |
| 41. | "A Sad Story (Alex's Theme)" | 0:59 |
| 42. | "Pickle Jar Rag (Haley's Theme)" | 1:08 |
| 43. | "Echos (Sebastian's Theme)" | 0:46 |
| 44. | "Grapefruit Sky (Dr. Harvey's Theme)" | 1:17 |
| 45. | "Alex's Keepsake" | 0:44 |
| 46. | "Band Practice" | 0:18 |
| 47. | "Sam's Band (Electronic)" | 1:06 |
| 48. | "Sam's Band (Pop)" | 1:07 |
| 49. | "Sam's Band (Bluegrass)" | 1:05 |
| 50. | "Sam's Band (Heavy)" | 1:04 |
| 51. | "A Dark Corner Of The Past" | 0:40 |
| 52. | "Music Box Song" | 1:17 |
| 53. | "Jaunty" | 0:57 |
| 54. | "Violin Solo" | 0:26 |
| 55. | "Wedding Celebration" | 0:42 |
| 56. | "Mines (Crystal Bells)" | 2:55 |
| 57. | "Mines (A Flicker In The Deep)" | 1:28 |
| 58. | "Mines (Star Lumpy)" | 1:47 |
| 59. | "Mines (Icicles)" | 1:44 |
| 60. | "Mines (Marimba Of Frozen Bone)" | 1:58 |
| 61. | "Mines (Cloth)" | 1:49 |
| 62. | "Mines (Visitor To The Unknown)" | 2:11 |
| 63. | "Mines (The Lava Dwellers)" | 3:02 |
| 64. | "Mines (Magical Shoes)" | 1:50 |
| 65. | "Mines (Danger!)" | 1:55 |
| 66. | "In The Deep Woods" | 2:09 |
| 67. | "Journey Of The Prairie King – Overworld" | 1:47 |
| 68. | "Journey Of The Prairie King – The Outlaw" | 1:09 |
| 69. | "Journey Of The Prairie King – Final Boss & Ending" | 1:26 |
| 70. | "Load Game" | 1:55 |
| 71. | "Shane's Theme" | 1:15 |
| 72. | "Dreamscape" | 1:02 |
| 73. | "Song Of Feathers (Emily's Theme)" | 2:57 |
| 74. | "Emily Dance" | 1:02 |
| 75. | "Night Market" | 2:11 |
| 76. | "Submarine Theme" | 2:07 |
| 77. | "Mermaid Song" | 1:09 |
| 78. | "Sun Room (Alone With Relaxing Tea)" | 1:45 |
| 79. | "Grapefruit Sky (Pasta Primavera Mix)" | 1:28 |
| 80. | "The Happy Junimo Show Theme" | 0:46 |
| 81. | "Movie Theater" | 1:47 |
| 82. | "Crane Game" | 0:31 |
| 83. | "Wumbus (Movie Theme)" | 0:51 |
| 84. | "Exploring Our Vibrant World (Movie Theme)" | 1:39 |
| 85. | "The Zuzu City Express (Movie Theme)" | 0:33 |
| 86. | "Movie Theater (Closing Time)" | 0:57 |
| 87. | "JunimoKart (Title Theme)" | 1:39 |
| 88. | "JunimoKart (The Gem Sea Giant)" | 2:03 |
| 89. | "JunimoKart (Slomp's Stomp)" | 1:21 |
| 90. | "JunimoKart (Ghastly Galleon)" | 1:25 |
| 91. | "JunimoKart (Glowshroom Grotto)" | 2:05 |
| 92. | "Ginger Island" | 2:40 |
| 93. | "Professor Snail's Radio" | 1:30 |
| 94. | "Volcano Mines (Molten Jelly)" | 2:47 |
| 95. | "Volcano Mines (Forgotten World)" | 2:51 |
| 96. | "Mystery Of The Caldera" | 1:19 |
| 97. | "The Gourmand's Cave" | 0:42 |
| 98. | "Pirate Theme" | 1:04 |
| 99. | "Leo's Song" | 1:41 |
| 100. | "Summit Celebration" | 3:00 |

== Personnel ==
- Produced, composed, and performed by Eric Barone.

== See also ==
- Stardew Valley: The Board Game
- Stardew Valley: Festival of Seasons
- The Official Stardew Valley Cookbook
- Stardew Valley Guidebook
- Stardew Valley: Symphony of Seasons
