= Harvest Moon Benefit Festival =

The Harvest Moon Festival was an annual music festival based in Cincinnati, Ohio, as a fundraiser for charities to benefit the homeless and hungry in Ohio. Created by Cincinnati natives Kent Meloy (Collins Gate, Staring at the Sea, Kelp, Kid Jupiter) and Jay Nungesser (Collins Gate, Staring at the Sea, Virgoblique), it ran annually from 1999 to 2004, growing in size and popularity each year. Originally conceived as a concert featuring bands that "sounded like fall"—local folk and roots-rock bands—the Festival's musical scope grew to include jazz-rock (The Doug Perry Ensemble), jazz (Me or the Moon), experimental electronica (Sedate), and reggae (Kris Brown), with the only constant being Katie Reider as the festival's headliner for its entire run. The Festival even grew beyond Cincinnati, as sister festivals of the same name sprung up around America, coordinated by Meloy.

The Festival brought together a wide variety of Ohio and Kentucky-based musicians each year—each band donating its time to the cause—and raised additional money and awareness by selling CDs at the event collecting all the night's bands into a collectible album, called Voices of Harvest Moon (vols. 1-4).

The festival became one of the best-known musical events each fall, but increasing scheduling conflicts between bands and venues, a lack of sponsorship, and the difficulties in keeping an audience for an early-October music festival caused Meloy and Nungesser to cancel the annual event in 2004 and replace it with the Christmastime-themed Festivus Maximus festival, which proved popular during its two-year run at the Southgate House in Newport, Kentucky.

== Harvest Moon (1999-2003) ==
=== 1999 ===
The festival debuted at the 20th Century Theatre in Oakley, Ohio as a fundraiser for Freestore Foodbank. The following bands played after a bagpiper ceremonially piped in the festival:

- Collins Gate
- The Treefrogs
- Katie Reider
- Tracy Walker
- Grace in Gravity
- Lux

=== 2000 ===
The festival had its second year at the 20th Century Theatre and raised money for the Oakley Soup Kitchen. Ric Hordinski, formerly of Over the Rhine, joined the festival for a rare public performance with his band Monk.

- Collins Gate (in their final performance)
- Katie Reider
- Monk
- Mohenjo Daro

=== 2001 ===
The festival had outgrown its venue and moved to the historic Southgate House. The response from local bands to join the festival was so great that three stages were used simultaneously: the main stage for full bands, a smaller stage upstairs for solo acoustic acts and small groups, and a third-floor experimental-music stage for electronica and DJs. The show raised several thousand dollars for Cincinnati Children's Hospital. 2001 also marked the first year that a compilation CD, Voices of Harvest Moon, was produced for sale at the show and at local music stores.

- Katie Reider
- Staring at the Sea
- Gwendolyn Speaks
- Heidi Howe
- Janet Pressley
- Dave Purcell & Pike 27
- Kris Brown's Family Sauce
- Ryan Adcock Band
- Virgoblique
- Swarthy
- The Mood Rings
- Northern Road
- Perkolaters
- Sedate
- Tracy Walker

=== 2002 ===
With the huge public response in 2001, the festival again took over the Southgate House's three floors with over a dozen acts, ranging from folk to rock to experimental electronica, again benefitting Cincinnati Children's Hospital, and a second volume of Voices of Harvest Moon was produced. Kent Meloy organized sister Harvest Moon Festivals in Chicago and Los Angeles which were held simultaneously with the Cincinnati fest.

- Katie Reider
- Staring at the Sea
- Vic Daniels Quartet
- Swarthy
- Doug Perry Ensemble
- Venus Mission
- Kenya DuBois
- Dave Hisch
- Eric Loy
- Me or the Moon
- The Locals
- Elizabeth Kemler
- Janet Pressley-Barr
- Lohio

=== 2003 ===
The 2003 festival, again held at the Southgate House, had much the same lineup as the 2002 festival, and again benefitted Cincinnati Children's Hospital, raising nearly $1000. The festival was broadcast live on local radio station WAIF. Overall, the 2003 festival was marked by a dramatically low attendance (mainly due to construction on the roads surrounding the venue) which made the possibility of a 2004 show much less likely.

- Katie Reider
- Staring at the Sea
- Vic Daniels Quartet
- Swarthy
- Doug Perry Ensemble
- Screaming Mimes
- Matthew Shadley Band
- Hungry Lucy
- Eric Loy
- When Elizabeth
- Me or the Moon
- Jimmy Joe and the Ramblin' Ramblers

=== 2004 ===
The sixth annual show, to benefit Cincinnati Children's Hospital, was scheduled for October 29, 2004, and was to have featured a lineup of The Greenhornes, Ashley Peacock, Abiyah, Kelp, The Screaming Mimes, Tracy Walker, and Boom Bip. Due to scheduling conflicts with bands and the Southgate House venue, the festival was cancelled at the last minute.

== Festivus Maximus (2004-2005) ==
An impromptu festival was put together for December 18, renamed Festivus Maximus, and featured:

- Katie Reider
- Screaming Mimes
- Kelp
- Venus Mission
- Lovely Crash
- Swarthy
- Whitney Barricklow
- The Smittys
- Holiday karaoke with the Ho Ho Ho's in the upstairs parlor

=== 2005 ===
Festivus Maximus was declared the Event of the Week on the front page of The Cincinnati Enquirer, and founders Kent Meloy, Jay Nungesser, and Dave Storm were interviewed for a feature article in Cincinnati CityBeat. The event benefitted the Autism Society and raised over $3000. The lineup featured:

- Screaming Mimes
- Kelp
- Sleepybird
- Steven Gregory
- Kohai
- The Factories (iTunes link)
- Matthew Shadley Band
- Visceral Elixir
- Pale Beneath the Blue
- Beau Alquizola Band
- Le Technopuss13s
- Infinite Number of Sounds
- DJ Empirical
- Stash
- Kelly Thomas and the Fabulous Pickups
