= Cozy game =

Video game genre

A cozy game (cosy game in Commonwealth English) is a video game which emphasizes non-violence and relaxation. Initially derived from the life simulation genre, cozy games commonly include activities such as gathering and growing plants and nurturing other characters. They often have open-ended goals that encourage self-expression.

While developers have suggested the style may have appeared in games as early as Little Computer People (1985) and The Sims (2000), it became a more common term following the release of Stardew Valley (2016) and Animal Crossing: New Horizons (2020), with dozens of games using it as part of their marketing.

== Characteristics ==
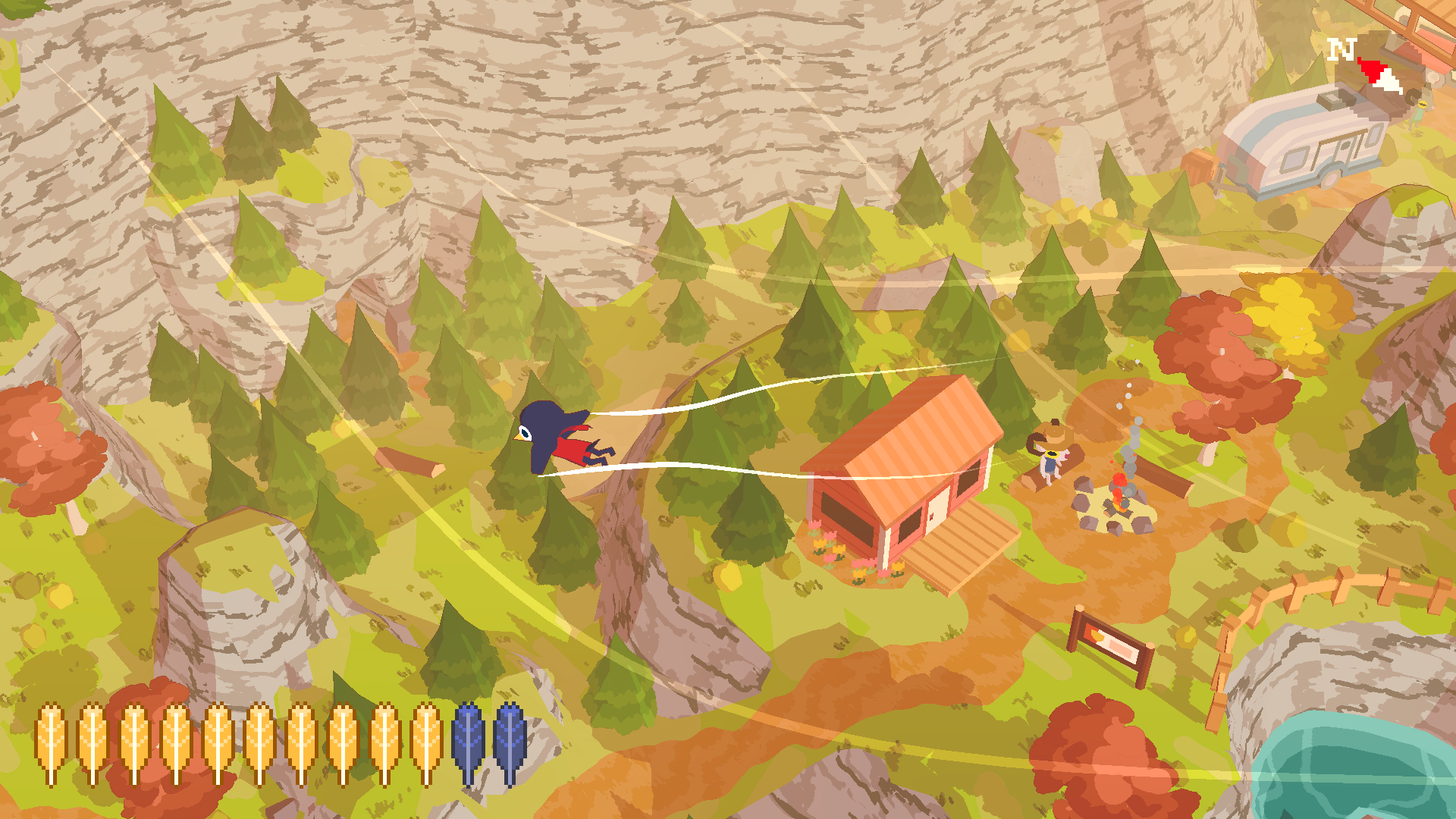
A Short Hike (2019), in which the player explores a park, has been described as a cozy game.

There is no precise definition of a cozy game, as such games cover a range of gameplay mechanics from other genres, but generally cover games of low intensity gameplay designed to give the player the feeling of coziness and comfort as they play. Colin Campbell of GamesIndustry.biz described cozy games as video games that generally have players functioning in "activities such as farming, gathering, growing and nurturing" and assisting other characters through non-violent acts. Campbell summarized that the core of the games was self-expression, that progression goals are generally open-ended, and that, unlike other game genres that apply gameplay mechanics such as first-person shooter or turn-based strategy, they are generally defined by their impact on the player's feelings.

According to CNN's Carli Velocci, cozy games are "a broad genre that encompasses a lot of types of games, from farming sims to city builders, but they all elicit a special feeling that can be hard to explain". Similarly, Wired's Louryn Strampe described the genre as "meant to evoke feelings of warmth, comfort, and peace". The vague definition has led to disagreement and confusion among fans of the genre regarding what games qualify as "cozy".

Campbell found that cozy games often feature cute characters such as anthropomorphic animals or child-like humans. Non-playable characters (NPCs) who are disagreeable are often played for comic effect. Alternatively, Jess Rutland of Game Developer suggested that cozy games involved satisfying but not overly challenging gameplay, complementary colors, and mindful music. Campbell suggested in 2022 that cozy games were aiming to move beyond "gather and grow" themed gameplays, citing A Short Hike (2019) as an example. Rutland stated that cozy games were the most accessible genre to people who did not consider themselves to be gamers and are easier for smaller independent developers to create.

== History ==
Some developers suggested the style evolved from the life simulation game, which originated with games like Little Computer People (1985), Harvest Moon (1996), The Sims (2000), and Boku no Natsuyasumi (2000). Vice suggested in 2018 that "coziness could ... be one of the most significant game design trends of recent years", noting its hybrid of escapism and the ability to appeal to players not seeking action-oriented gameplay.

The release of Nintendo's Animal Crossing: New Horizons (2020) during the COVID-19 lockdowns led to the increased popularity of cozy games; Campbell found only "a handful" of the "dozens" of games described as "cozy" on digital distributor Steam were released before 2020. Alexandre Stroukoff, one of the founders of Alblune who created the game The Spirit and the Mouse, said in 2022 that "People get depressed, and they need to relax. This has always existed in gaming, but it was a less marketable idea in the past. Now, we recognize that it's an important part of playing games."

== Cultural influence ==
Merchandise from cozy games such as Animal Crossing expanded beyond selling from dedicated websites, to being connected with brands such as LEGO, Puma and Build-A-Bear.

In 2023, the first official line of The Sims merchandise was released to an overwhelming response which led to nearly all items selling out in less than a day. Rutland noted the influence of the cozy aesthetic inspired by games on social media. This included the #CozyDeskSetup hashtag's annual usage doubling in March 2024. These setups echoed elements from the games such as calming lighting, pastel, or muted tone furniture and accessories from popular cozy video games franchises.

== See also ==
- Cozy fantasy
- Cozy mystery
- Farm life sim
- Iyashikei
