= Stardew Valley =

2016 video game

- Developer: ConcernedApe
- Publisher: ConcernedApe (Note: Previously published by Chucklefish)
- Director: Eric Barone
- Producer: Eric Barone
- Designer: ConcernedApe (Note: Including the writing, art, audio, and programming)
- Programmer: Eric Barone
- Artist: Eric Barone
- Composer: Eric Barone
- Engine: MonoGame
- Platforms: Windows; Linux; macOS; PlayStation 4; Xbox One; Nintendo Switch; PlayStation Vita; iOS; Android; Nintendo Switch 2
- Release: February 26, 2016: Windows; February 26, 2016; Linux, macOS; July 29, 2016; PlayStation 4; December 14, 2016; Xbox One; December 14, 2016; Nintendo Switch; October 5, 2017; PlayStation Vita; May 22, 2018; iOS; October 24, 2018; Android; March 14, 2019; Nintendo Switch 2; NA: December 25, 2025; EU: March 6, 2026
- Genre: Farm life sim
- Modes: Single-player, multiplayer

Stardew Valley is a 2016 farm life simulation video game developed by Eric "ConcernedApe" Barone. Players take the role of a character who inherits their deceased grandfather's dilapidated farm. The game is open-ended, with players managing the farm by clearing land, growing seasonal crops, and raising animals. Players can acquire skills in farming, foraging, fishing, mining, and combat. Social features include building relationships with townspeople, with the option to marry and have a child. A later update added multiplayer, allowing online play with others.

Barone created Stardew Valley by himself over five years as an indie developer. He began the project to improve his programming and game design skills. He was heavily inspired by the Harvest Moon series (now named Story of Seasons), with additions to address some of those games' shortcomings. British studio Chucklefish approached Barone halfway through development with an offer to publish the game, allowing him to focus on completing it. It was released for Windows in February 2016 and was subsequently ported to other platforms, including home video game consoles, handheld consoles, mobile phones, and operating systems.

Stardew Valley received generally positive reviews from critics, including Yasuhiro Wada, the creator of Harvest Moon. The game has been cited as one of the best video games ever made and is credited with causing a resurgence in popularity for the farming sim genre. It became one of the best-selling video games, selling 50 million copies by February 2026. The game appeared on several publications' year-end lists and received accolades, including the Breakthrough Award at the Golden Joystick Awards and a nomination for Best Game at the British Academy Games Awards.

== Gameplay ==
Stardew Valley puts players in charge of managing a farm, taking on tasks such as growing crops and raising livestock.

Stardew Valley is a farm life simulation video game set in top-down perspective. The open-ended game starts with the player character leaving their corporate job to manage a farm just outside of Pelican Town, located in the eponymous Stardew Valley. The farm inherited from their deceased grandfather must be restored, and players must assist in the town's revival.

Players may choose from several different farm types, each with a unique theme and different benefits and drawbacks. Each theme helps players focus on upgrading different types of skills faster. On the farm, players need to cut down trees, break rocks, and use a scythe to clear weeds to make space for tilling and planting. The farming system allows players to plant seasonal seeds that require daily watering and generally must be harvested before the next season. Players can also build barns and coops to raise animals for products like eggs and milk. As the game progresses through four 28-day seasons, players can complete certain tasks known as bundles. Players must collect a set amount of goods to complete each bundle and bring them to the Community Center to unlock new areas and activities such as a new island.

Players may develop skills in farming, foraging, fishing, mining, and combat. Interacting with townspeople and giving gifts builds relationships over time. Players can marry one of 12 bachelors or bachelorettes regardless of gender, allowing the spouse to help with daily farm chores such as cooking, feeding animals, or watering crops. After marriage, the couple may choose to have children. Time in the game is divided into day-length segments. Each morning, players begin with a full energy bar, which decreases as tasks are performed and can be replenished by eating food. A nearby cave system holds ores that can be mined and smelted by using a furnace. The cave also contains monsters, adding a combat element to mining. Players must switch between a pickaxe and a sword while exploring deeper levels, where more valuable treasures can be found. A multiplayer mode was introduced in a later update, allowing online play with other players.

== Development ==
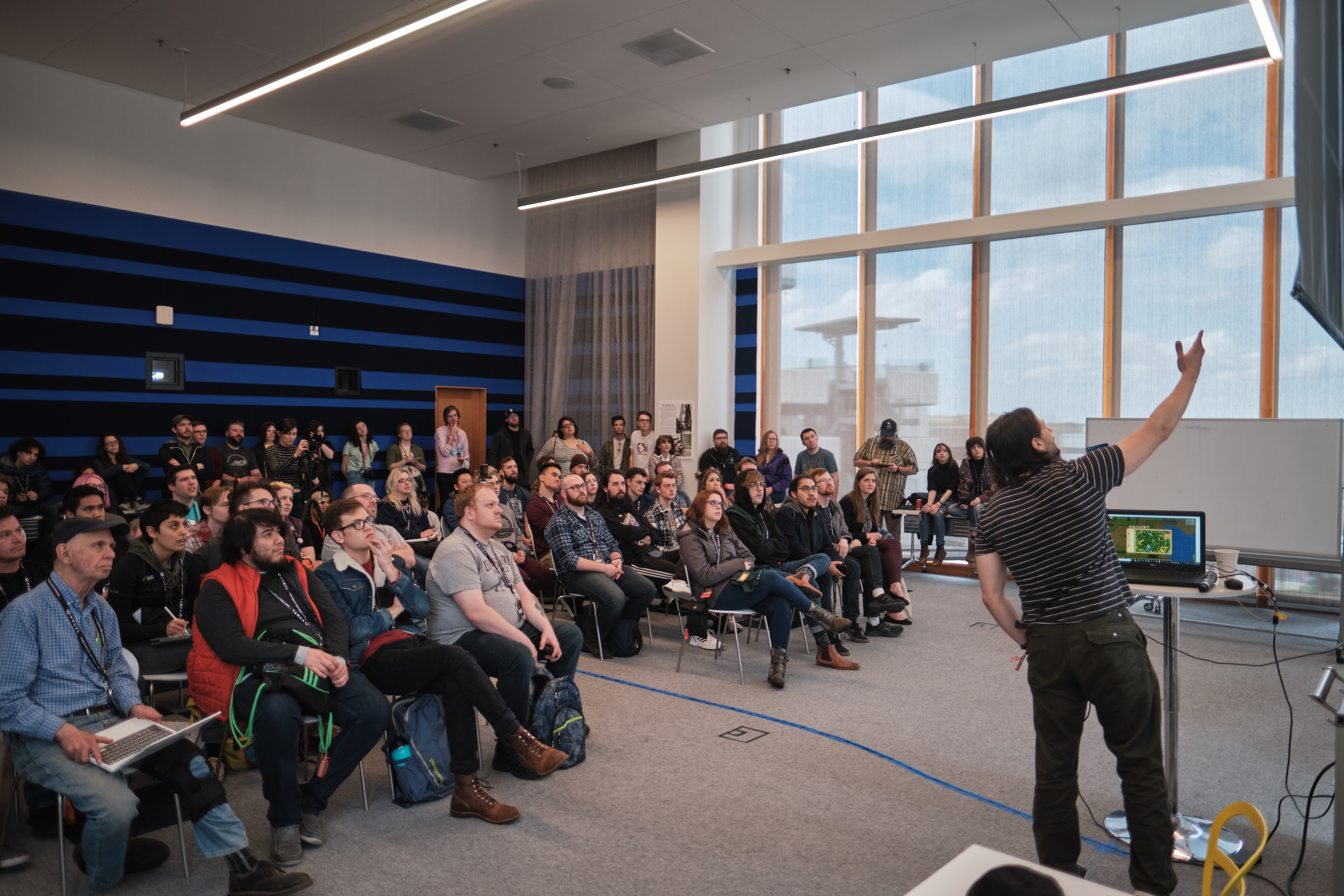
Developer Eric "ConcernedApe" Barone at Hackfort 2019, describing the development of Stardew Valley

Stardew Valley was created by American indie game designer Eric Barone, known professionally as ConcernedApe. Barone graduated from the University of Washington Tacoma in 2011 with a computer science degree but was unable to get a job in the industry, instead working as an usher at the Paramount Theatre in Seattle. Looking to improve his computer skills for better job prospects, he had the idea to craft a game that would also pull in his artistic side. Barone grew up in the Pacific Northwest and incorporated many elements of the region into the gameplay and art.

Stardew Valley originally began as a modern, fan-made alternative to later Harvest Moon titles, as Barone felt the series had gotten "progressively worse" after Harvest Moon: Back to Nature. Unable to find a satisfactory replacement, he created a game similar to the series, explaining that he aimed to fix the issues he had with Harvest Moon and felt that no title in the series ever brought everything together perfectly. Originally titled Sprout Valley, Barone spent five years developing the game before its official release. He was the sole developer of the game, including all of its pixel art, music and sound effects. Barone used Reason Studios, a digital audio workstation, for music and sound effects and Paint.NET for the pixel art. He chose not to use Steam's Early Access feature for development, as he felt it was not well suited to Stardew Valley. The game was originally programmed in C# using the Microsoft XNA framework, later migrating to MonoGame in 2021. Barone stated that the migration ensured the game remains "futureproof", enabling mods to use more than 4 GB of RAM.

"Stardew Valley Overture"
Title screen song, composed by Barone

Barone aimed to give players the feeling of immersion in a small farming community, saying he wanted Stardew Valley to be entertaining while also having "real-world messages". In contrast to most Harvest Moon games, which could end after two in-game years, Barone kept Stardew Valley open-ended so players would not feel rushed to try to complete everything. He designed the game to encourage a relaxed playstyle, allowing players to take as much time as they wanted to explore its activities, plot lines, and goals to feel excited rather than stressed. While he had hoped most players would learn on their own, he noticed some immediately used spreadsheets and guides to optimize their farm's income. He saw this approach as inevitable but not entirely in the spirit of the game. To that end, he designed the cooking system purposely not to be profitable, but instead to pay back in bonuses that aided exploration, farming, mining, and fishing skills. Barone also chose not to include the butchering of farm animals for meat, encouraging players to name and tend to each animal.

=== Release ===
Barone initially considered releasing Stardew Valley on Xbox Live Indie Games, but the project grew beyond its original scope. He announced the game in September 2012, using Steam Greenlight to gauge interest in it. After strong community support, Barone began full-time development, engaging with Reddit and Twitter communities to share progress and gather feedback. Shortly after the Greenlight period in 2013, he was approached by Finn Brice, director of Chucklefish, who offered to help publish the game on release. Chucklefish handled several non-development activities, including site hosting and setting up a wiki. In April 2015, Barone said he would release the game only when it was feature complete and declined pre-sales. Stardew Valley was released for Windows via Steam and GOG.com on February 26, 2016.

=== Post-release ===
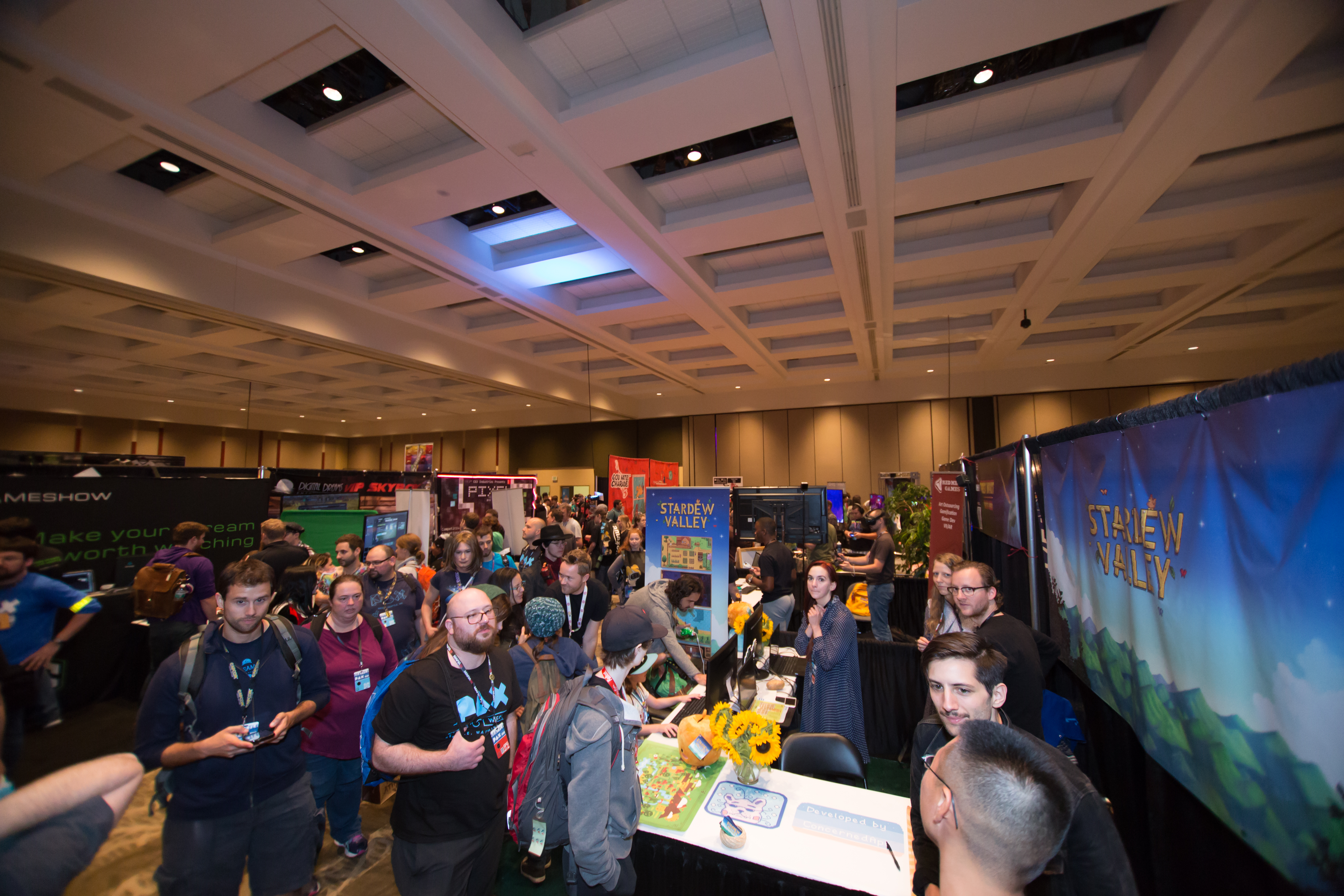
Stardew Valley booth at PAX West 2016

Barone continued developing Stardew Valley since its official release, incorporating community feedback, fixing bugs, and adding new features. He also planned more end-game content and ports on other platforms. In May 2016, Barone announced that Chucklefish would help with non-English localizations, Linux, macOS, and console ports, and the technical aspects required for online cooperative play, allowing him to focus on the first major content update. Barone had planned for public beta testing of the multiplayer feature in late 2017 for the Windows version, but was still working to improve the network code by early 2018. The multiplayer beta for Windows was released in April 2018 and officially launched for all PC platforms on August 1, 2018. In December 2018, the multiplayer update was released for the Nintendo Switch. That same month, Barone said he wanted to assemble a team of developers to help continue the game's development. He regained publishing rights for all platforms except for Android, iOS, and Nintendo Switch reverted to Barone. By 2019, all versions of the game, except on mobile, were self-published by Barone. He regained the rights for the official wiki in February 2021, the iOS release in December 2021, and the Android release in March 2022, ending Chucklefish's involvement. In March 2024, Barone published a major update that significantly expanded the game, with mobile and console platforms receiving the update in November of that year.

Stardew Valley was released on several platforms following its initial launch. The Linux and macOS ports were released on July 29, 2016. Console ports for the PlayStation 4 and Xbox One were announced at E3 2016 in June. At the same event, Barone said that a port for the Wii U would also be released. However, that version was later canceled in favor of a version for the Nintendo Switch. The PlayStation 4 and Xbox One versions were released on December 14, 2016. The Switch version, ported by Sickhead Games, was released on October 5, 2017. A PlayStation Vita port was released on May 22, 2018. Retail versions for the PlayStation 4 and Xbox One were published and distributed by 505 Games. A collector's edition released at the same time included a physical map of the game's world, a download code for the soundtrack, and a guidebook. Mobile versions for iOS and Android were developed with help of The Secret Police, with the iOS version released on October 24, 2018, and the Android version on March 14, 2019. Both versions include the ability for Linux, macOS, and Windows users to transfer progress to their device. In December 2019, Stardew Valley was added to the Tesla Arcade, a Linux-based video game service incorporated within most models of Tesla electric cars. In 2020, Barone collaborated with Fangamer to announce the physical release of the game's standard and collector's edition, as well as the Nintendo Switch and PC versions. The Nintendo Switch 2 edition of Stardew Valley was released on December 25, 2025.

== Mods ==
Stardew Valley has also seen an active modding community, with players adding various new features to the game. As of 2026, over 30,000 mods have been created. One of the most popular mods is Stardew Valley Expanded, which adds multiple new characters and locations and has been downloaded over 4 million times. Devin Hedegaard, the mod's creator, later joined the Stardew Valley development team. Other mods offer more cosmetic options ranging from changing the overall appearance of the game to introducing new animal designs. Most mods are only playable through the PC version of the game. Later updates to the game have added features for mod developers.

In March 2025, a fan made Baldur's Gate 3-themed mod was released, titled Baldur's Village. The mod received praise from Larian Studios founder Swen Vincke. In the same month, lawyers representing Wizards of the Coast have had the mod removed under the Digital Millennium Copyright Act (DMCA). Vincke took to social media to voice his support for fan-made mods, raising concerns about how they are handled and urging for a solution to be found. On April 1, 2025, Wizards of the Coast issued a statement on the DMCA, saying that it happened in error and apologized for the situation.

== Reception ==
=== Critical reception ===
Reception

Aggregate scores
| Aggregator | Score |
|---|---|
| Metacritic | (iOS) 88/100 (Note: Based on 4 reviews) (PC) 89/100 (Note: Based on 30 scored reviews of 32 total reviews) (PS4) 86/100 (Note: Based on 11 reviews) (XONE) 89/100 (Note: Based on 10 reviews) (NS) 87/100 (Note: Based on 14 scored reviews of 15 total reviews) |
| OpenCritic | 99% (Note: Based on 75 reviews) |

Review scores
| Publication | Score |
|---|---|
| 4Players | 8/10 |
| Game Informer | 8.75/10 |
| GameRevolution | 9/10 |
| GameStar | 86/100 |
| IGN | 10/10 (Note: Originally rated a 8.8/10 in March 2016, but later re-rated to a 9.5/10 in August 2018, and re-rated to a 10/10 in July 2024 after the 1.6 update) |
| PC Gamer (UK) | 80/100 |
| Polygon | 9/10 |

Stardew Valley received "generally favorable" reviews, according to review aggregator website Metacritic. (Note: Attributed to multiple references:) Fellow review aggregator OpenCritic assessed that the game received "mighty" approval, being recommended by 99% of critics. Yasuhiro Wada, creator of Harvest Moon, said he was "very happy" with Barone's game as it has led to Harvest Moon not being forgotten. He added that Stardew Valley captured the sense of freedom he had envisioned for the series, while bringing more focus to animation and graphics.

Farm life simulation and the overall gameplay experience were widely praised by critics. Jonathan Leack of GameRevolution wrote that the game effectively integrates its progression systems, activities, and rewards in a way that makes each in-game day feel distinct and cohesive. Writing for Game Informer, Javy Gwaltney commended the farming mechanics for creating a relaxing and rewarding gameplay loop. Daniella Lucas of PC Gamer highlighted crafting and farm customization as enjoyable features that enhance the player's ability to design and improve their farm. Kallie Plagge of IGN praised the combination of RPG and farming elements, noting that it creates an engaging experience without feeling stressful. Carli Velocci of Polygon underlined that Stardew Valley gives players a strong sense of achievement, with even simple daily tasks feeling satisfying. Conversely, Jan Wöbbeking of 4Players wrote that repetitive farming actions made the early hours feel tedious. However, he noted that as progression systems expand, the farming routine becomes less monotonous. Gwaltney criticized the absence of fast travel and considered the map system as lackluster, as it made moving between locations repetitive and time-consuming.

The narrative and characters were generally well received by critics. Leack praised the dialogue and writing, stating that the villagers feature distinct personalities supported by strong writing. Gwaltney similarly highlighted the townsfolk's varied personalities, noting that they respond differently to the player. Lucas commended the depth and realism of the town's residents, highlighting their eccentricities and believable personalities. Plagge observed that although the townspeople have detailed, interconnected lives, the related mechanics for building relationships are simple in comparison. Velocci praised how small interactions with NPCs gradually reveal their personalities and challenges, providing narrative depth. Elena Schulz of GameStar noted that while certain story elements, such as the haunted community center, add interesting narrative touches, the game does not offer a particularly compelling or deep overarching story. Steven Wright of Paste described the game as being anti-capitalist, citing the negative portrayal of the fictional Joja Corporation. Many media outlets praised Stardew Valley for its LGBT options and representation, notably including the option for the player character to marry one of 12 villagers regardless of gender. (Note: Attributed to multiple references:) Aimee Hart of Gayming Magazine criticized the lack of racial diversity.

The visual style received positive reviews by critics. Leack described the sprite-based visual style as visually pleasing and well-suited to the game, highlighting the environmental variety across its four in-game seasons. Schulz praised the colorful pixel art style, calling its implementation particularly charming. Wöbbeking commended the attention to detail thanks to its charming animations and described the visual atmosphere, particularly the lighting effects, as magical.

The soundtrack was praised by critics. Leack complimented it as imaginative and beautifully composed. Gwaltney positively noted the music as light and enjoyable. Plagge singled out the music in the mine, writing that it reduces stress during combat and enhances the underground atmosphere. Schulz stated that the soundtrack, in combination with retro visuals, creates a picturesque atmosphere. Wöbbeking wrote that the soundtrack complements the atmosphere of the different weather conditions and seasons with relaxed chiptune melodies.

Combat and dungeon exploration were received mostly positive, though the combat's simplicity received criticism by some. Leack described combat as entertaining and further noted that it adds variety to the overall experience. Gwaltney had mixed feelings about the mine dungeon, calling it rather simple but noted that its combat and exploration offer a change of pace from the rest of the game. Plagge described combat as straightforward and repetitive, but enjoyable due to the sense of discovery and the reward of finding valuable items in the mine. Schulz similarly noted its simplicity, but highlighted that combat benefits from a rewarding progression loop centered on defeating enemies and acquiring better equipment.

The game's lack of a helpful tutorial and its controls received criticism. Leack considered the tutorial as underdeveloped and insufficient for most players. Velocci observed that the tutorial is minimal and does not clearly explain all gameplay mechanics. They additionally considered controls as imprecise, making some tasks frustrating to perform. Schulz similarly criticized the lack of guidance in form of a tutorial or tips on the controls. Conversely, Wöbbeking praised the simple control scheme for contributing to a relaxed gameplay experience. Lucas noted technical and interface issues at release, including cursor glitches, missed festival triggers, and confusing menus.

=== Retrospective reception ===
Stardew Valley has been claimed to be one of the greatest video games of all time. (Note: Attributed to multiple references:) Eight years after its original review, Polygon highlighted Stardew Valley's enduring popularity and continued relevance, noting that it still resonates with players and continues to grow without compromising its original charm. In a 2018 reassessment, IGN raised their original score, with Miranda Sanchez noting that updates since launch have added new items, objectives, and events. These updates improved accessibility for newcomers and provided fresh challenges for veteran players, while the multiplayer mode further enriched the experience. Following the release of the 1.6 update, IGN gave the game a perfect score, with Shailyn Cotten writing that the eight years of updates had transformed Stardew Valley into a modern classic.

=== Sales ===
Stardew Valley sold roughly 425,000 copies across Steam and GOG.com in its first two weeks, and more than a million within two months. Valve reported that Stardew Valley was in the top 24 revenue-generating games on Steam during 2016. Journalists noted that the gaming community had shown support for Barone and his game. While some players obtained the game illegally, many of them were impressed and indicated they planned to buy it. Others offered to help cover the cost for players who could not afford it.

By the end of 2017, Stardew Valley had sold more than 3.5 million copies across all platforms. The game became the most downloaded title on the Nintendo Switch for 2017, despite launching on the platform in October. Following its mobile launch in October 2018, Sensor Tower estimated that the game generated more than US$1 million in revenue within its first three weeks on the Apple App Store. By February 2026, Stardew Valley had sold over 50 million copies, 26 million of which were on PC and 7.9 million on Nintendo Switch.

=== Accolades ===
Stardew Valley received three nominations at the 2016 Golden Joystick Awards, winning the Breakthrough Award. At the 13th British Academy Games Awards, the game was nominated for Best Game. It received further nominations for Best Debut at the Game Developers Choice Awards and Best Independent Game at The Game Awards.At the SXSW Gaming Awards, it was nominated for Most Promising New Intellectual Property. It was further nominated for the Seumas McNally Grand Prize at the Independent Games Festival. At The Steam Awards, it received five nominations across multiple years between 2016 and 2024, winning once. (Note: Attributed to multiple references:)

Several Publications placed Stardew Valley on their year-end lists, including The Guardian (5th), Paste (8th), Polygon (8th), Slant Magazine (25th) and The Verge. Game Informer named the game as Best Simulation Game of 2016. In 2024, it received the Best Ongoing Game award by PC Gamer. That same year, Gamesindustry.biz featured it as one of their Games of the Year.

Awards and nominations for Stardew Valley
| Year | Award | Category | Result | Ref(s) |
|---|---|---|---|---|
| 2016 | Golden Joystick Awards | Best Indie Game | Nominated | |
| 2016 | Golden Joystick Awards | PC Game of the Year | Nominated | |
| 2016 | Golden Joystick Awards | Breakthrough Award | Won | |
| 2016 | The Game Awards 2016 | Best Independent Game | Nominated | |
| 2016 | 17th Game Developers Choice Awards | Best Debut | Nominated | |
| 2016 | Independent Games Festival | Seumas McNally Grand Prize | Nominated | |
| 2016 | SXSW Gaming Awards | Most Promising New Intellectual Property | Nominated | |
| 2016 | 13th British Academy Games Awards | Best Game | Nominated | |
| 2016 | The Steam Awards | The 'Best Use Of A Farm Animal' Award | Nominated | |
| 2016 | The Steam Awards | The 'I Thought This Game Was Cool Before It Won An Award' Award | Nominated | |
| 2017 | The Steam Awards | 'The World Is Grim Enough Let's Just All Get Along' Award | Won | |
| 2018 | The Steam Awards | Labor of Love | Nominated | |
| 2024 | The Steam Awards | Labor of Love | Nominated | |

== Legacy ==
=== Impact ===
Stardew Valley popularized farming and cozy games and helped define the modern farming simulator genre. According to Jess Reyes of Inverse, the game has played a key role in bringing farming and cozy games to broader audiences over the years. Noelle Warner of Destructoid credited it with much of the recent resurgence in farming simulators, calling it a "full-on cultural phenomenon" and one of the most successful indie games. Tomas Franzese of Digital Trends noted that while the original Harvest Moon established the farming sim genre, Stardew Valley's gameplay and world set the modern standard. Franzese further observed that the game has inspired numerous indie titles and led more major companies to explore the genre. Wes Fenlon and Kara Phillips of PC Gamer described Stardew Valley as the backbone of modern farming simulators, noting that new entries in the genre are routinely compared to it. They further wrote that its success sparked a wave of similar "Stardew-esque" games, with many developers drawing inspiration from its formula.

According to Ali Shutler of NME, Stardew Valley has been ranked first among the best video games for reducing stress. Gamasutra named Barone one of the top ten developers for 2016, identifying that he had "single-handedly" developed something that "breathed new life into a genre" otherwise dominated by the Story of Seasons series. In 2017, Matt Perez reported that Forbes named Barone one of their "30 Under 30" people to watch in the area of video games by citing his commitment towards making Stardew Valley.

=== Other media ===
The music of Stardew Valley has been released through soundtracks, collaborations and concert tours. Stardew Valley: Original Soundtrack was issued on September 19, 2016, followed by an official piano sheet music book and album on October 5, 2018. On August 15, 2020, the orchestral album Symphonic Tale: The Place I Truly Belong (Music from Stardew Valley), directed by Kentaro Sato and performed by the Budapest Symphony Orchestra, was released. Released on May 19, 2021, Barone collaborated with Norihiko Hibino on the album series Prescription for Sleep. The collaboration offers piano and saxophone arrangements of ten tracks from the original soundtrack alongside a new composition, "Beauty in the Seasons". Barone announced the first concert tour, Stardew Valley: Festival of Seasons, on October 10, 2023. A second concert tour, Stardew Valley: Symphony of Seasons, was revealed on November 20, 2024. On August 29, 2025, the instrumental album Stardew Valley (Festival of Seasons) was released, featuring 16 songs from the game.

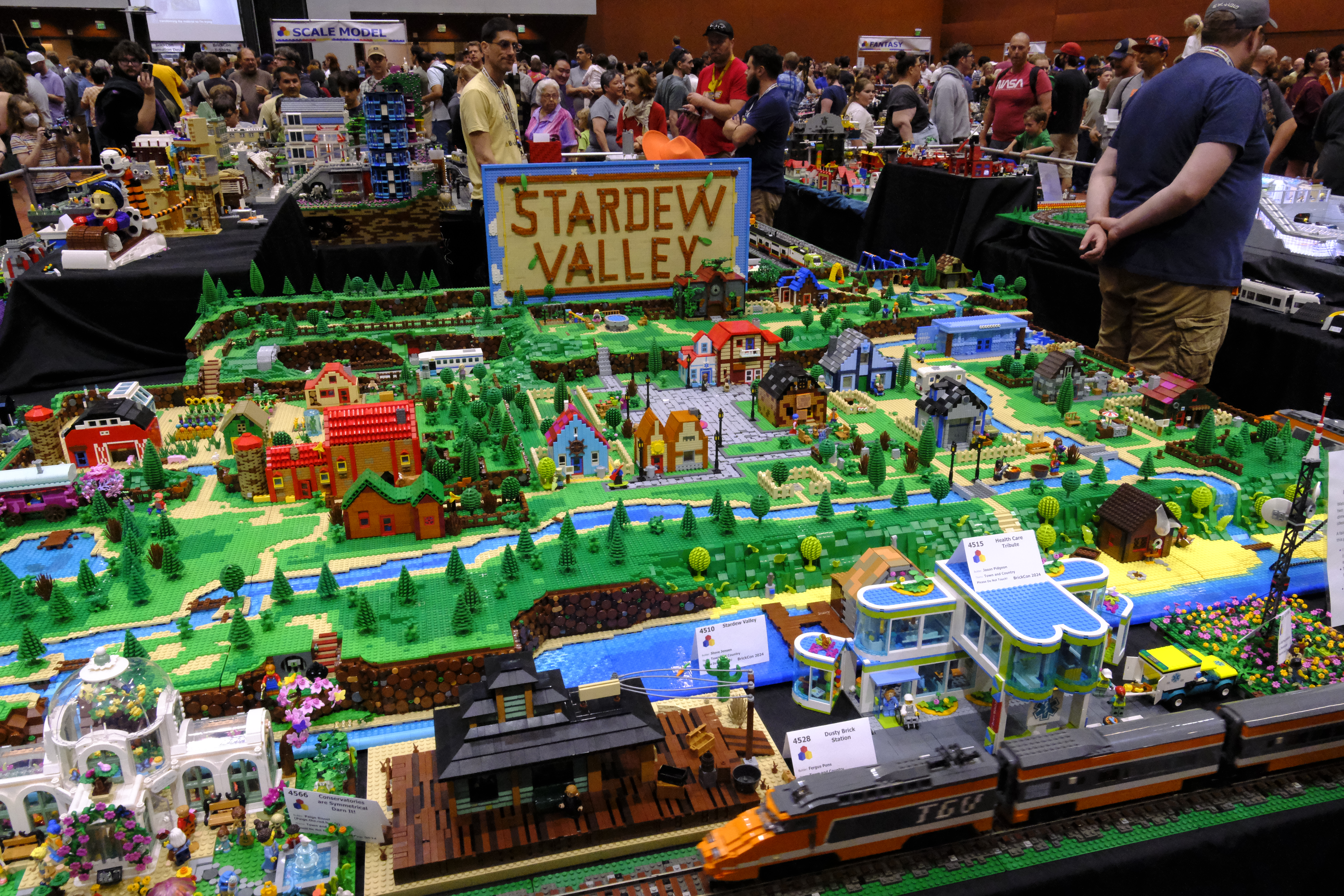
Lego recreation of Pelican Town from Stardew Valley, shown at BrickCon 2024

Stardew Valley has expanded beyond the original game into books and related media. The Stardew Valley Guidebook, written by Barone and Ryan Novak and illustrated by Kari Fry, was released in 2016. The book has been revised and reissued multiple times to align with the game's update versions. A cooperative board game adaptation, Stardew Valley: The Board Game, was released in February 2021. The Official Stardew Valley Cookbook, featuring adaptations of more than 50 in-game recipes, was released on May 14, 2024. In September 2017, journalist and author Jason Schreier described the development process of a number of games, including Stardew Valley, in his book Blood, Sweat, and Pixels: The Triumphant, Turbulent Stories Behind How Video Games Are Made. At BrickCon 2024, the 2-year-long construction of Stardew Valley's Pelican Town out of Lego won the "People's Choice" award. On October 25, 2024, American singer-songwriter Soccer Mommy released a song called Abigail, referencing the in-game character Abigail.

Several crossovers with other games were released. In September 2022, a collaboration with Terraria added one of its signature weapons, the Meowmere sword, to Stardew Valley. In October 2024, "Friends of Jimbo 2" update for Balatro featured some Stardew Valley characters. On September 2, 2025, Infinity Nikki released a collaboration with Stardew Valley, introducing music and rhythm games-inspired content that allows players to unlock cosmetic items. On November 18, 2025, Among Us released a collaboration with Stardew Valley that ran until February 18, 2026, introducing a range of unlockable Stardew Valley-themed cosmetics. On December 3, 2025, the book The Psychgeist of Pop Culture – Stardew Valley, edited by Elizabeth D. Kilmer and published by Play Story Press, was released. Part of the "The Psychgeist of Pop Culture" series created by Dr. Rachel Kowert, the book examines the psychological mechanisms, themes, and cultural impact of Stardew Valley. On July 27, 2026, Magic: The Gathering cards themed after Stardew Valley were released as part of the Secret Lair series. The Official Stardew Valley Crochet Book, containing 25 crochet patterns, will be released in January 2027.
