= Rings of Saturn (disambiguation) =

The rings of Saturn are an extensive set of planetary rings in orbit about the planet Saturn.

Rings of Saturn may also refer to:

== Literature ==
- The Rings of Saturn, a 1995 novel by the German writer W. G. Sebald
- Lucky Starr and the Rings of Saturn the final lucky Starr novel by Isaac Asimov.

== Music ==
- Rings of Saturn (band), an American band
  - Rings of Saturn (Rings of Saturn album), 2022
- Rings of Saturn (Rashied Ali and Louie Belogenis album), 1999
- "Rings of Saturn", a song by Nick Cave and the Bad Seeds from Skeleton Tree
- Ring of Saturn (EP), an extended play by Goldie released in 1998
- "The Rings of Saturn", a song by Emma-Jean Thackray released in 2022
- "Rings of Saturn" (Soccer Mommy song), 2026

== Video games ==
- Rings of Saturn (1981 video game), a game for the Apple 48K
- ΔV: Rings of Saturn, a 2023 space flight simulation game for Windows, Linux and macOS

== Other uses ==
- Rings of Saturn, a professional wrestling hold also known as a double underhook crossface

== See also ==
- Ring (disambiguation)
- Saturn (disambiguation)
