= Abigail (song) =

Single by Soccer Mommy

from the album Evergreen
- Released: October 22, 2024
- Studio: Maze Studios (Atlanta, Georgia)
- Genre: Indie rock
- Length: 3:08
- Label: Loma Vista
- Songwriter: Sophia Regina Allison
- Producer: Ben H. Allen III

Soccer Mommy singles chronology
"Driver" (2024)	"Abigail" (2024)

"Abigail" is a song recorded by American singer-songwriter Soccer Mommy. The song was released on October 22, 2024, through Loma Vista Recordings, as the fourth single from her fourth studio album, Evergreen. The song is a serenade to Abigail, a non-playable villager in the farming video game Stardew Valley. Soccer Mommy's Sophia Allison wrote the song as a writing exercise during a relatively fallow period. The song was produced by Ben H. Allen III and recorded at his Atlanta studio.

== Composition and lyrics ==
The song is a serenade to Abigail, a purple-haired non-playable villager in the video game Stardew Valley. The song directly references several aspects of the character's hobbies—hanging out in a graveyard, her propensity for chocolate cake—as Allison begs for her hand in marriage. Allison had been working on her fourth album, Evergreen, and had hit a wall and began to struggle with writer's block. Though not an avid gamer, Allison was fond of Stardew Valley in particular, having even streamed it online in the past. Abigail was her favorite character in the game to marry, and she began writing the song as an ode to her as part of a writing exercise. Upon conclusion, she enjoyed the love song so much that she decided to include it on Evergreen, as she felt it fit sonically and thematically with its style. The uptempo song opens with an arresting snare roll and proceeds across dreamy electric keys.

The song's music video depicts Soccer Mommy in the game itself, marrying Abigail in the game's retro pixel style. The clip was directed by Leonel Montero.

== Reception ==
Danielle Chelosky at Stereogum called it a "sweeping ballad", Hanif Abdurraqib, writing in the New Yorker, complimented its carefree tone in comparison to the visceral melancholy that runs through Evergreen. Matthew Pywell in DIY praised its fantastical and imaginative feel, especially on Evergreen: "It feels completely standalone, as suddenly we're catapulted into a technicolour world which wouldn't have looked out of place on 2020's Color Theory." Eric Bennett of Paste viewed it as "an immediate highlight. [...] it's both a soaring indie-rock jam and a charming nod to something that brings Allison comfort amid life's harder moments."
