= Allison (Soccer Mommy song) =

2017 song by Soccer Mommy

Song by Soccer Mommy

from the album Collection
- Released: August 4, 2017
- Length: 2:39
- Label: Fat Possum
- Songwriter: Sophie Allison

"Allison" is a 2017 song by American singer-songwriter Sophie Allison, under the moniker Soccer Mommy. It appears as the opening track on her album Collection.

== Composition and lyrics ==
The Fader called the track "an unhurried guitar jam". Allison told the magazine that the song was among the most personal to her on the album, and said it was "about feeling like you're putting yourself ahead of someone you love." The Line of Best Fit stated that "because of the subject matter and the obvious experiential inspiration, the song is so personal that listening to it almost feels like an intrusion, a step too far."

== Music video ==
A music video was produced for the track, which was the first of her career. According to Allison: "The video kind of focuses on me and my own solitude. I spent last year away from the person I was seeing and I focused a lot on my music and this song is kind of a reflection of the distance and loneliness I felt while spending time on my art."
