= Bones (Soccer Mommy song) =

Single by Soccer Mommy

from the album Sometimes, Forever
- Genre: Indie rock
- Length: 4:05
- Label: Loma Vista
- Songwriter: Sophie Allison

"Bones" is a song by American singer-songwriter Sophie Allison, known under the moniker Soccer Mommy. It was released as the third single from her third studio album Sometimes, Forever.

== Background and writing ==
Sophie Allison stated that she initially composed the track for a romantic comedy before making the decision to use the song for the album.

The music video was directed by American filmmaker and actor Alex Ross Perry, who is known for his films Her Smell and Listen Up Philip, and was also involved in the music video for "Yellow is the Color of Her Eyes".

== Composition and lyrics ==
Paste said that "the track maintains a certain sugary sheen and pop sensibility." Lyrically, the track explores the topic of self-doubt within a romantic relationship. According to Allison: "'Bones' is a song about struggling with the parts of yourself that you don’t like in a relationship. It’s about wanting to become better for someone and feeling like you’re standing in your own way."
