= Scorpio Rising =

Scorpio Rising may refer to:

== Music ==
=== Bands ===
- Scorpio Rising (band), an English rock band

=== Albums ===
- Scorpio Rising (Death in Vegas album)
- Scorpio Rising (Prong album)
- Scorpio Rising (Paul Ryan album), a 1976 album by Paul Ryan
- Scorpio Rising (Tomoyasu Hotei album), a 2002 album by Tomoyasu Hotei

=== Songs ===
- "Scorpio Rising" (10,000 Maniacs song), a song by 10,000 Maniacs from their 1985 album The Wishing Chair
- "Scorpio Rising" (Death in Vegas song), a song by Death in Vegas
- "Scorpio Rising" (Eraserheads song), a song by Filipino rock band Eraserheads from their 1998 international album Aloha Milkyway
- "Scorpio Rising" (Soccer Mommy song), a song by Soccer Mommy
- "Scorpio Rising" (Vive Le Rock), a song by Adam Ant from his 1985 album Vive Le Rock
- "Scorpio Rising" (Yello song), a track by Yello from the December 2009 re-release of their album Touch Yello

== Television ==
- "Scorpio Rising" (Mighty Max episode), a Mighty Max episode
- "Scorpion Rising" (Your Friendly Neighborhood Spider-Man), a Your Friendly Neighborhood Spider-Man episode

== Other uses ==
- Scorpio Rising (film), a 1963 short film by Kenneth Anger

== See also ==
- Scorpia Rising, a 2011 novel in the Alex Rider series by Anthony Horowitz
