= Circle the Drain (Soccer Mommy song) =

2020 single by Soccer Mommy

Single by Soccer Mommy

from the album Color Theory
- Released: January 14, 2020
- Studio: Alex the Great Recording (Nashville, Tennessee)
- Genre: Indie rock; pop rock
- Length: 4:40
- Label: Loma Vista
- Songwriter: Sophie Allison
- Producer: Gabe Wax

Soccer Mommy singles chronology
"Feed" (2019)	"Circle the Drain" (2020)	"Bloodstream" (2020)

"Circle the Drain" (stylized in all lowercase) is a song recorded by American singer-songwriter Sophie Allison, under the moniker Soccer Mommy. The song was released on January 14, 2020 through Loma Vista Recordings, as the lead single from her second studio album Color Theory.

The song's music video, directed by Atiba Jefferson, pictures Allison meeting with skateboarders in Palm Springs, California.

To promote the song, Soccer Mommy performed the song, as well as "Lucy", on Jimmy Kimmel Live! on February 26, 2020.

== Composition and lyrics ==
The song touches upon themes of depression and its effects on everyday mental health. According to Allison in a Pitchfork interview: "It’s about having depressive episodes and withdrawing myself into isolation; making it poppy is this weird cry for help while being like, I don’t know how I’m going to make it through this. The first part is about trying hard to keep myself in a good place while worrying about falling into the spiral again. Then, feeling a pull to that low place and almost laughing about it, in a weird way."

== Critical reception ==
Spin columnist Will Gottsegen dubbed the track a "compelling contradiction", contrasting its upbeat sound with its despondent lyrics: "It's that air of mismatch that makes "circle the drain" one of Soccer Mommy's most compelling songs to date." James Rettig at Stereogum compared it to the music of Avril Lavigne, while Pitchfork reviewer Jayson Greene likened it to Sheryl Crow and 2000s pop production team the Matrix.
