= Lucy (Soccer Mommy song) =

Single by Soccer Mommy

from the album Color Theory
- Released: 2019
- Genre: Indie rock
- Length: 4:56
- Label: Loma Vista
- Songwriter: Sophie Allison

"Lucy" is a song by American singer-songwriter Soccer Mommy, released in November 2019 as the lead single for her sophomore studio album Color Theory.

== Release and promotion ==
"Lucy" was released on 7" vinyl. A lyric video was created for the single, the style of which drew comparisons to the 1999 film The Matrix.

== Composition and lyrics ==
The Fader said that the song "carries an airier, more jangly sound" than the grunge-oriented material on Clean. The song employs dissonant guitar chords. BrooklynVegan said the track was "a little more atmospheric and a little bigger sounding than Clean, but unmistakably the work of Soccer Mommy." Substream Magazine said that the song "takes on a darker tone for the singer while still maintaining her dreamy delivery."

Songwriter Sophie Allison said: "[It's] a really fun song for me because it has a dark, evil vibe. It’s a song about struggling with inner demons and your own morality, but I masked it with this scenario of being seduced by the devil. [...] I think it shows a different side of my writing." Additionally, she told Pitchfork that the song was about "constantly trying to make the right decision. I feel so black-and-white about issues with morality a lot of the time. I want to be perfect at that, so it’s upsetting when I’m tricked or seduced by small evils." She further explained that the song was inspired by frustrations she experienced with the music industry: "There’s so many times where you have to work with companies and you don’t necessarily like everything about them. You feel like there are a lot of downsides, like with streaming services. It was this feeling of being frustrated about that, like not knowing how you can work and live in this world without being torn all the time."
