= Sometimes, Forever =

Studio album by Soccer Mommy
- Released: June 24, 2022
- Studios: Sound Emporium (Nashville, Tennessee)
- Genre: Indie rock
- Length: 42:35
- Label: Loma Vista
- Producer: Daniel Lopatin

Soccer Mommy chronology
Color Theory (2020)	Sometimes, Forever (2022)	Evergreen (2024)

Singles from Sometimes, Forever
- 1. "Shotgun" Released: March 23, 2022; 2. "Unholy Affliction" Released: April 20, 2022; 3. "Bones" Released: May 18, 2022; 4. "Newdemo" Released: June 9, 2022

Sometimes, Forever is the third studio album by American indie rock singer-songwriter Sophie Allison, known under the moniker Soccer Mommy. Released on Loma Vista Recordings on June 24, 2022, the album was produced by Daniel Lopatin.

The album has been described as "production-focused" and incorporates elements of various alternative rock subgenres and industrial music. It has received critical acclaim and was ranked among the year's best albums by multiple publications.

== Background and recording ==
Allison began writing material for the album in the summer of 2019. The closing track "Still" was the first track that was written. The sludge metal-inspired track "Darkness Forever" was written immediately afterward.

Sometimes, Forever has been described by critics as "production-focused". Sophie Allison began working with Daniel Lopatin (known by his stage name Oneohtrix Point Never) on her third studio album in late 2020, a few months after the release of her second album Color Theory.

The album was recorded at Sound Emporium Studios in Nashville, Tennessee. The album's recording was completed in 2021.

== Music and lyrics ==
Sometimes, Forever incorporates elements of alternative rock subgenres such as dream pop and shoegaze, in addition to trip hop and industrial music. The album employs the "wall-of-sound" production technique. American entertainment trade magazine Variety described the album's production and music as "maximalist". NPR stated that the album's sound was "far removed, in other words, from the lo-fi bedroom recording of Soccer Mommy's DIY origins." According to producer Daniel Lopatin: "Sophie finds magical ways to complicate her bubblegum melodies with a subtle weirdness: a twisted chord, a bent texture, some dark comedy. It’s addictive to listen to all that sweet and sour stuff she has going on, so I just tried to amplify that."

Sometimes, Forever contains some of Allison's musically heaviest tracks to date. The third track "Unholy Affliction" has been described as "ominous" and "glitchy" by NPR. According to staff writer Jewly Hight, the track "lurches from an industrial feel to thrashy, punishing drumming and, eventually, the momentary disintegration of the ensemble altogether." She also mentioned that the track employs "sludgy guitar chords." The sixth track "Darkness Forever" also contains elements of sludge, and also employs screamed vocals during its middle section.

Sometimes, Forever has been described as "darker" and "more personal" than Soccer Mommy's previous album, while retaining Allison's tradition of confessional lyricism. The tenth track "Feel It All the Time" explores the topics of ageing and freedom. The closing track "Still" explores the topics of depression, self-harm and suicidal ideation, according to Variety.

== Release and promotion ==
Allison announced Sometimes, Forever on March 23, 2022. The announcement was accompanied by the music video of "Shotgun", the album's lead single. Allison proceeded to release three more singles — "Unholy Affliction", "Bones" and "Newdemo" in the lead-up to the album's release. To promote the album, Allison sat down for interviews with outlets including Pitchfork and Rolling Stone. She also performed live on Jimmy Fallon's Tonight Show and Jimmy Kimmel Live!.

== Critical reception ==
Professional ratings
Aggregate scores
Source	Rating
AnyDecentMusic?	8.0/10
Metacritic	84/100
Review scores
Source	Rating
AllMusic	4/5 stars
Clash	8/10
DIY	4/5 stars
The Guardian	4/5 stars
The Line of Best Fit	9/10
NME	4/5 stars
Pitchfork	8.0/10
Slant Magazine	3/5 stars
Telegraph	4/5 stars
Paste Magazine	8.5/10

Sometimes, Forever has a score of 84/100 on Metacritic based on 20 reviews, indicating "universal acclaim"; the highest score for any Soccer Mommy album as of 2026.

Albumism critic Jeremy Levine gave the album a perfect score, saying that "it cements Soccer Mommy as one of the most exciting voices in indie pop." Paste's Eric Bennett described it as Soccer Mommy's "most creative work to date", while The Line of Best Fit critic Tom Williams described Sometimes, Forever as "an astounding artistic accomplishment that deserves to propel Allison to the very highest ranks of the indie world." A minority of critics, however, offered more mixed reviews, with Slant Magazine's Thomas Bedenbaugh describing the album as "an ambitious but unmemorable experiment", lacking the "indelible" "lyrical themes and melodies" of her previous work. Writing for PopMatters, John Amen gave the album 7/10 and remarked, "Absent an infectious melody and accompaniment that establishes rhythmic and/or ambient contrast, her voice tends to grow monotonous and disengaging. But when the aesthetic balances are in place, as they are for much of Sometimes, Forever, then Allison glows like a moon reflecting a dying sun, one of the substantial artists of her generation."

Year-end Lists
Publication	List	Rank	Ref.
Albumism	The 100 Best Albums of 2022	26	
Associated Press	AP's Top Albums 2022	N/A	
A.V. Club	The 30 best albums of 2022	24	
Far Out	The 50 best albums of 2022	41	
Flood Magazine	Flood's Best Albums of 2022	21	
The Forty-Five	Albums of the year 2022	37	
Impose	The Top 50 Albums of 2022	N/A	
Magnet	Magnet's Top 25 Albums of 2022	4	
The New York Times	Best Albums of 2022	N/A	
No Ripcord	The 50 Best Albums of 2022	31	
Northern Transmissions	Best Albums of 2022	15	
ourculture	The 50 Best Albums of 2022	34	
Paste Magazine	The 50 Best Albums of 2022	16	
Pitchfork	The 50 Best Albums of 2022	45	
Pitchfork	The 38 Best Rock Albums of 2022	N/A	
Rolling Stone	The 100 Best Albums of 2022	42	
Stereogum	The 50 Best Albums of 2022	4	
Under The Radar	Best Albums of 2022	23	
Uproxx	The Best Albums of 2022	N/A	
Vulture	The Best Albums of 2022	Honorable Mention	

== Track listing ==
All tracks were written by Sophie Allison and produced by Daniel Lopatin.

Sometimes, Forever track listing
No.	Title	Length
1.	"Bones"	4:05
2.	"With U"	4:06
3.	"Unholy Affliction"	3:06
4.	"Shotgun"	4:10
5.	"Newdemo"	3:29
6.	"Darkness Forever"	4:15
7.	"Don't Ask Me"	4:28
8.	"Fire in the Driveway"	3:37
9.	"Following Eyes"	3:59
10.	"Feel It All the Time"	3:15
11.	"Still"	3:59
Total length:		42:35

== Personnel ==
Credits are adapted from the album's liner notes and Tidal.

=== Musicians ===
- Sophie Allison – vocals, guitar (all tracks)
- Julian Powell – electric guitar (all tracks)
- Rodrigo Avendaño – acoustic guitar (1, 4–5, 8); electric bass guitar (1–3, 6, 9–10); electric guitar (4, 7–10); synthesizer (6, 11)
- Rollum Haas – drums (1–4, 6–10)
- Daniel Lopatin – synthesizer (1–6, 8–9, 11); piano (2, 11)
- Nate Boyce – guitar (1, 6–8)
- Gabe Wax – electric bass guitar (2, 9); guitar (2, 10)
- Graeme Goetz – electric bass guitar (4, 7, 9–10); synthesizer (10)

=== Technical ===
- Daniel Lopatin – production, recording
- Gabe Wax – additional production
- Nate Boyce – additional production (1, 6–8)
- Matt Cohn – engineering
- Lars Stalfors – mixing
- Ruairi O'Flaherty – mastering

=== Artwork ===
- Sophie Hur – photography
- Christopher Leckie – design
- Sophie Allison – design

== Charts ==
Chart performance for Sometimes, Forever
Chart (2022)	Peak position
Australian Digital Albums (ARIA)	32
Australian Hitseekers Albums (ARIA)	7
Scottish Albums (Official Charts)	14
UK Albums (Official Charts)	95
US Billboard 200	137
