= M (Soccer Mommy song) =

Single by Soccer Mommy

from the album Evergreen
- Released: August 1, 2024
- Genre: Indie rock, grunge, sentimental ballad
- Label: Loma Vista
- Songwriter: Sophie Allison

Soccer Mommy singles chronology
"Lost"	"M"	"Driver"

"M" is a 2024 song by American singer-songwriter Soccer Mommy, taken as the second single from her fourth studio album Evergreen. Songwriter Sophie Allison stated that the track was a personal favorite of hers from the album.

== Background and release ==
The track and its music video were released in tandem with the album's announcement. The video was directed by Anna Pollack. According to Rolling Stone, the video depicts "Allison wander[ing] around nature, play[ing] with an adorable cat, and drink[ing] coffee at a diner."

== Composition and lyrics ==
AllMusic said "M" contains "themes of missing people and feelings never expressed." Regarding the song's background and meaning, Allison told NPR: "It's definitely about a specific thing in my life and losing someone and, you know, not having them there anymore. It's been a couple of years since I've lost someone, but it hits you different all the time, I think, and you just kind of have to find a way to move forward." She told fashion magazine Paper: "I think, particularly with something like loss, I just wanted to understand how I was feeling better. I wanted to say something that felt like all the things you wish you could say to someone."

"M" employs twangy guitar tones. The Line of Best of Fit described the song's first half as a "grunge ballad". The track also features heavy reverberation. Consequence compared the song to the music on Allison's 2020 album Color Theory, as well as the album Punisher by Phoebe Bridgers, which was released the same year.

The instrumentation in the track's second half contains a flute solo and a string section. Allison told Stereogum: "I just wanted it to be very light and lifting and wispy. Which I think we nailed at the end. [...] It was one of the big moments where I was like, 'It's flute time. This is gonna be where the flute is going crazy.'"

== Critical reception ==
Rolling Stone called the track "devastating". Stereogum called the song's outro "surprising and cool", and compared it to Pet Sounds by the Beach Boys.
