= Evergreen (Soccer Mommy album) =

Studio album by Soccer Mommy
- Released: October 25, 2024
- Studios: Maze Studios (Atlanta, Georgia)
- Length: 41:25
- Label: Loma Vista
- Producer: Ben H. Allen III

Soccer Mommy chronology
Sometimes, Forever (2022)	Evergreen (2024)

Singles from Evergreen
- 1. "Lost" Released: June 6, 2024; 2. "M" Released: August 1, 2024; 3. "Driver" Released: September 10, 2024; 4. "Abigail" Released: October 22, 2024

Evergreen is the fourth studio album by American indie rock singer-songwriter Sophie Allison, known under the moniker Soccer Mommy. Produced by Ben H. Allen, it was released on October 25, 2024, through Loma Vista Recordings. The album has received positive reviews from the critics.

== Background and recording ==
Following a period of "profound and personal loss", Allison was "opting for more organic production" to keep the songs "raw and relatable, unvarnished and honest". As a result, the album features some of her "most vulnerable and honest" songwriting to date, according to British music magazine DIY. The track "Thinking of You" was composed and arranged within a period of "probably 10 or 15 minutes", according to Allison. The opening track "Lost" was the final song written for the album.

Evergreen was recorded at Maze Studios in Atlanta, Georgia with production handled by Ben H. Allen, known for his work with Deerhunter, Animal Collective and Belle and Sebastian.

== Release and promotion ==
Allison announced the album on August 1, 2024. Accompanying the announcement was the release of the album's single "M". Derrick Rossignol of Uproxx called the track "a sonic return to Soccer Mommy’s roots, but recast on a cinematic scale".

The record was preceded by the singles "Lost" on June 6, 2024, a "painterly introduction" to the album, "M" alongside the album announcement on August 1, and the "light hearted" "love-song" "Driver" on September 10. Allison previously performed songs off the album at a series of intimate shows in May and June 2024, including "Evergreen", "M", "Lost", "Salt in Wound" and "Driver".

== Music ==
The instrumentation on Evergreen is slower in tempo and employs substantially fewer synthesizers and distorted guitar tracks than on previous entries in Allison's discography, opting for mostly clean guitar tones throughout. The album is additionally layered with instruments such as looping stations, flutes, strings, acoustic guitars and programming. Allison told Guitar Player: "I was definitely leaning away from the shoegazey stuff, sonically. These songs are a little more intimate. I wanted them to sit at the forefront with everything I had in the demo, right there in the center, which is usually rhythm guitar and vocals. I just thought that the cleaner tones would have a little brighter, dreamier feel." She also stated the intention behind the stripped down production was to emphasize the songwriting: "In the past, I was always really excited about production, trying weird things and stepping out of the box. That’s great, but this time I really wanted to make sure it felt like me. Really honest."

The third single "Driver" contains elements of grunge.

Allison created the bird vocalization and "nature sounds" heard on the opening track "Lost" by plugging a microphone into a boutique guitar pedal manufactured by a company called Hologram. Her vocals on the album were compared to American musician Emmylou Harris and Canadian singer-songwriter Joni Mitchell by NME. Allison additionally said she drew influence from Lucinda Williams on the album. In a conversation with Interview, Allison recommended the album be listened to while "driving around with the windows down on a nice day."

== Lyrics ==
Allison wrote many of the album's lyrics while processing the loss of her mother, according to Rolling Stone. NPR described the album as "a snapshot of the quiet complexities of grief, the profound sadness that leaves space for feelings of love, healing, even joy." Allison said of the album's lyrics, "I think it tells a lot about a certain period of time for me. Compared to a lot of my other albums, it's less of a story. You know, it's less of a, I guess, journey from start to finish and more just kind of a lot of pieces put together." She told Guitar Player: "Just like any other album that I’ve made, I do a lot of self-reflection. It’s a lot of trying to manage my thoughts to get to the bottom of how I feel. It’s a balance of complicated thoughts and emotions. That’s definitely what I was trying to do, and not necessarily in a purposeful way. But it’s natural for me when I’m working through a lot of stuff."

The song "Abigail" is dedicated to the Stardew Valley character of the same name.

== Critical reception ==
Professional ratings
Aggregate scores
Source	Rating
AnyDecentMusic?	7.7/10
Metacritic	81/100
Review scores
Source	Rating
AllMusic	3.5/5 stars
Clash	8/10
DIY	4/5 stars
Kerrang!	4/5
The Line of Best Fit	8/10
Paste	7.8/10
Pitchfork	7.2/10
PopMatters	8/10
Rolling Stone	4/5 stars

According to the review aggregator Metacritic, Evergreen received "universal acclaim" based on a weighted average score of 81 out of 100 from 15 critic scores.

== Track listing ==
All tracks are written by Sophia Regina Allison.

Evergreen track listing
No.	Title	Length
1.	"Lost"	3:20
2.	"M"	3:52
3.	"Driver"	4:12
4.	"Some Sunny Day"	4:02
5.	"Changes"	4:59
6.	"Abigail"	3:08
7.	"Thinking of You"	3:42
8.	"Dreaming of Falling"	3:50
9.	"Salt in Wound"	4:14
10.	"Anchor"	3:18
11.	"Evergreen"	2:48
Total length:		41:25

== Personnel ==
Musicians

- Sophie Allison – vocals, acoustic guitar (all tracks); programming (track 1), electric guitar (2–10)
- Ben H. Allen III – piano (tracks 1, 2, 4, 6), synthesizer (1, 3–6, 8, 10, 11), programming (1, 3–6, 10, 11), drums (1, 3–5), bass guitar (1, 5, 6, 11), percussion (1, 5, 11), keyboards (3), guitar (4, 8, 11)
- Dave Freeman – flute (tracks 1–3, 5, 7)
- Raven Bush – strings (tracks 1, 2, 5, 10, 11)
- Rodrigo Avendano – synthesizer (tracks 1, 4, 6–8), guitar (2, 4, 11), electric guitar (2, 4), keyboards (5, 8, 9), acoustic guitar (6); bass guitar, piano (7); organ (10)
- Julián Powell – electric guitar (tracks 2–10), acoustic guitar (5, 10)
- Rollum Haas – drums (tracks 2–10), percussion (10)
- Nickolas Widener – bass guitar (tracks 2–10)

Technical

- Ben H. Allen III – production, mixing
- Greg Calbi – mastering
- Steve Fallone – mastering
- Sophia Trautman – mixing, engineering, recording assistance
- Kegan Krogh – engineering
- Tomás Uribe – engineering
- Ben Etter – recording
- Sully Allen – recording assistance
- Raven Bush – recording arrangement

== Charts ==
Chart performance for Evergreen
Chart (2024–2025)	Peak position
UK Album Downloads (Official Charts)	60
UK Albums Sales (Official Charts)	41
UK Americana Albums (Official Charts)	9
