= Your Dog =

2018 Soccer Mommy song

Single by Soccer Mommy

from the album Clean
- Released: January 9, 2018
- Studio: Alex the Great Recording (Nashville, Tennessee)
- Genre: Indie rock; pop rock; power pop
- Length: 3:14
- Label: Fat Possum
- Songwriter: Sophie Allison
- Producer: Gabe Wax

Soccer Mommy singles chronology
"Last Girl" (2017)	"Your Dog" (2018)	"Cool" (2018)

"Your Dog" is a song recorded by American singer-songwriter Sophie Allison, under the moniker Soccer Mommy. The song was released on January 9, 2018 through Fat Possum Records, as the lead single from her debut studio album Clean.

== Background ==
Allison wrote the song at the conclusion of a relationship. She considered herself in a "pathetic" place when writing the song, hopeful to be stronger but finding it difficult to do so. Allison said the song is about the feeling of being "paralyzed" and being used in a relationship. She explained, "The song and the video are meant to show someone breaking away and taking action, but at the same time, it's only a quick burst of motivation. It's a moment of strength amidst a long period of weakness."

The song's music video, directed by Weird Life, has been described by Mike Katzif of NPR as a "bleakly humorous horror flick illustrating the sudden, heartbreaking ending of a relationship which had long since soured."

== Critical reception ==
NPR's Katzif extolled the tune as an "anthem suited for these times. It's a song reclaiming agency and identity taken by another other person's condescension, control and abuse." Olivia Horn at Pitchfork too labeled it an "emboldened anthem," complimenting its "charming, twisted guitar riffs" and "breathy multi-tracked vocals." Dave Simpson at The Guardian praised its "vivid, startling lyrics."
