= Clean (Soccer Mommy album) =

Studio album by Soccer Mommy
- Released: March 2, 2018
- Genres: Indie rock; lo-fi; indie pop; bubblegrunge
- Length: 34:38
- Label: Fat Possum
- Producer: Gabe Wax

Soccer Mommy chronology
Collection (2017)	Clean (2018)	Color Theory (2020)

Singles from Clean
- 1. "Your Dog" Released: January 9, 2018; 2. "Cool" Released: January 29, 2018; 3. "Scorpio Rising" Released: July 16, 2018

Clean is the debut studio album by American indie rock singer-songwriter Sophie Allison, known under the moniker Soccer Mommy. It was released on March 2, 2018 through Fat Possum Records.

Clean is considered by some to be one of the best indie rock releases of the 2010s.

== Music and lyrics ==
Categorized as an indie pop album, Clean is also said to contain elements of grunge, power pop and pop-punk. The album has also been categorized under the bubblegrunge microgenre "due to its girlhood-diary-confessional nature." The tracks are characterized as having a "sinuous, lived-in feel." The album alternates between "cheeky," uptempo tracks and softer tracks that "blossom into fluttering, luscious finales." The album's closing track "Wildflowers" has been called "hypnotizing." The album's guitar work incorporates arpeggiated chord progressions and distortion.

According to the fashion magazine Paper, Clean is a "breakup album". Characterized as a "melancholy interspersed with anger," the album's lyrics explore themes such as infatuation, betrayal, acceptance, insecurity, emotional validation, power dynamics, dating, and idealization/devaluation. Jenn Pelly of Pitchfork said, "This soft music is not precious. It’s gnarly and intense, like the heart itself." The album's lyrical content is said to be more mature than those on its predecessor, Collection.

Sophie Allison told The Fader that the album was ultimately "a realization that you can’t deny your emotions. It’s in the stars."

== Critical reception ==
Professional ratings
Aggregate scores
Source	Rating
AnyDecentMusic?	7.6/10
Metacritic	78/100
Review scores
Source	Rating
AllMusic	4/5 stars
DIY	4/5 stars
Exclaim!	8/10
The Independent	4/5 stars
Mojo	3/5 stars
NME	4/5 stars
Pitchfork	8.4/10
Q	3/5 stars
Uncut	7/10
Vice (Expert Witness)	A−

At Metacritic, which assigns a normalized rating out of 100 to reviews from music critics, Clean received an average score of 78, indicating "generally favorable reviews".

Thomas Smith of NME praised the album's production and Allison's lyrics, calling Clean "a dazzling and devastating triumph." Chris Gee of Exclaim! wrote, "Allison is promptly hitting her stride and clearly gaining confidence and showing it with strands of snarkiness and angst mixed within her delicate, vulnerable songs." DIY wrote, "In typical Soccer Mommy fashion, there’s little flashy footwork to be found here; only expertly-shaped understated songs that give more with every listen. Stepping beyond the groundwork of her debut collection, and sounding all the more confident for it, Sophie Allison shoots, and she scores."

Critics made note of the heightened sense of maturity present in the album's lyrics compared to those on Collection. Paste wrote, "Allison is young, her slight 20 years evident not only in her youthful voice, but her talk of missed calls from mom, parked cars, and hanging around after school. But Allison does it all in an honest, uncomplicated, and well-crafted way that Clean is anything but juvenile." The Independent wrote, "Clean isn’t just about the teenage experience; [it] encapsulates emotions and situations that are as versatile as her sound. Whether you’re reminiscing about late-night make out sessions in high school or surrounded by plenty of “cool” girls in your city, Soccer Mommy’s introspection is something that defies age."

=== Accolades ===
Accolades for Clean
Publication	Country	Accolade	Rank
Paste	US	The 50 Best Albums of 2018	4
Pitchfork	US	The 50 Best Albums of 2018	27
Rolling Stone	US	The 50 Best Albums of 2018	16
Noisey	US	The 100 Best Albums of 2018	45
Billboard	US	50 Best Albums of 2018: Critics' Picks	40
Stereogum	US	The 50 Best Albums of 2018	7
Uproxx	US	The 50 Best Albums of 2018	14
The Ringer	US	The Best Albums of 2018	3
The New York Times (Jon Caramanica list)	US	The 28 Best Albums of 2018	1
The New York Times (Jon Pareles list)	US	The 28 Best Albums of 2018	8
Nashville Scene	US	Top Local Albums Critics' Poll	5
Newsweek	US	The Best Albums 2018	7
The Seattle Times	US	The 10 Best Pop Albums of 2018	8
Esquire	US	The 20 Best Albums of 2018	12
The New Zealand Herald	New Zealand	TimeOut's Best of 2018: Top 20 albums	13
Exclaim!	Canada	Top 20 Pop & Rock Albums: Best of 2018	17
BrooklynVegan	US	Top 50 Albums of 2018	21
The Line of Best Fit	UK	The Best Albums of 2018	30
NME	UK	Albums of the Year 2018	39
The A.V. Club	US	The Best Indie and Rock Albums of 2018	N/A
Los Angeles Times	US	Best Albums of 2018	N/A

== Track listing ==
All tracks are written by Sophie Allison.

Clean track listing
No.	Title	Length
1.	"Still Clean"	4:01
2.	"Cool"	3:16
3.	"Your Dog"	3:14
4.	"Flaw"	3:41
5.	"Blossom (Wasting All My Time)"	3:12
6.	"Last Girl"	3:35
7.	"Skin"	4:01
8.	"Scorpio Rising"	4:42
9.	"Interlude"	1:38
10.	"Wildflowers"	3:18
Total length:		34:38

== Personnel ==
Credits are adapted from the Clean liner notes.

- Sophie Allison – guitar; vocals; bass
- Julian Powell – lead guitar
- Nick Brown – drums
- Gabe Wax – piano; synthesizer; mellotron; bass; guitar; drum programming; percussion
- Roger Kleinman – piano; synth
- Ali Chant – mixing
- Sami Alam – front cover photo
