= Shotgun (Soccer Mommy song) =

Single by Soccer Mommy

from the album Sometimes, Forever
- Released: March 23, 2022
- Recorded: 2021
- Studio: Sound Emporium (Nashville, Tennessee)
- Genre: Indie rock
- Length: 4:10
- Label: Loma Vista
- Songwriter: Sophie Allison
- Producer: Daniel Lopatin

Soccer Mommy singles chronology
"Rom Com 2021 (with Kero Kero Bonito)" (2021)	"Shotgun" (2022)	"Unholy Affliction" (2022)

"Shotgun" is a 2022 single by American indie rock singer-songwriter Sophie Allison under the moniker Soccer Mommy. It was taken from her third studio album Sometimes, Forever.

== Composition and lyrics ==
American fashion magazine Nylon described the song as "a grimy and gritty track that feels like a hardened version of the streaky indie rock from [Allison's] previous releases." Pop culture magazine PopMatters described the song as "dancey, grungy, and anthemic," comparing it to "Seven Nation Army" by The White Stripes and "Army of Me" by Björk. Writers at The Singles Jukebox wrote that "the bass sounds like it’s coming from a paper cup."

The track is about Sophie Allison's romantic partner Julian Powell, who also plays guitar in the band and on the recording. According to Allison herself: "'Shotgun' is all about the joys of losing yourself in love. I wanted it to capture the little moments in a relationship that stick with you."

== Other versions ==
A Simlish version of the song was recorded and released for The Sims 4: High School Years Expansion Pack. Allison said on Instagram that she felt her life had "truly come full circle," according to AV Club. A video was released to promote this version, which recreated the song's music video using The Sims 4.

The band performed a stripped-back version of the song on NPR's Tiny Desk Concerts.

== Music video ==
A music video was made for the song, which was directed by Kevin Lombardo. A remix of the track was released by American musical duo Magalena Bay in August of 2022.

== Reception ==
PopMatters referred to "Shotgun" as "one of 2022’s more infectious songs" and said it was the highlight of the album.

== Chart performance ==
Chart performance for "Shotgun"
Chart (2022)	Peak position
US Adult Alternative Airplay (Billboard)	13
