= Cool (Soccer Mommy song) =

Single by Soccer Mommy

from the album Clean
- Released: January 29, 2018
- Studio: Alex the Great Recording (Nashville, Tennessee)
- Genre: Power pop
- Length: 3:16
- Label: Fat Possum
- Songwriter: Sophie Allison
- Producer: Gabe Wax

Soccer Mommy singles chronology
"Your Dog" (2018)	"Cool" (2018)	"Scorpio Rising" (2018)

"Cool" is a 2018 single by American singer-songwriter Sophie Allison, under the moniker Soccer Mommy. It appears as the second track from her debut studio album Clean.

== Musical style and lyrics ==
The Fader described the track as "deceptively sunny". The song's lyrics explore the theme of coolness. Regarding the track's meaning, Allison told Consequence that the song "creates this figure of everything I want to be. It’s fun and upbeat because it’s like a hopeful moment where I’m thinking about how I’m going to be moving forward in my life. However, it’s idealizing things that won’t necessarily make me happy." Pitchfork described the track as "a breezy, catchy quasi-love song about a girl so badass she eats boys alive." The Fader said the song was a highlight from the album.

== Music video ==
A music video was created for the song, which Northern Transmissions described as being reminiscent of the teen films of the 1990s. It was directed by Ambar Navarro and was animated by an entity known as Art Baby Girl. The Fader described the video as "Crayola-colored".
