= Rom Com 2004 =

Single by Soccer Mommy
- Released: 2021
- Genre: Indie pop, glitch
- Length: 2:54
- Label: Loma Vista Recordings
- Songwriter: Sophie Allison
- Producer: BJ Burton

Rom Com 2004 (stylized as "rom com 2004") is a 2021 single by American indie rock singer-songwriter Soccer Mommy.

It was produced by BJ Burton and was remixed two months later by British indie pop band Kero Kero Bonito, which music magazine The Fader described as "plush rave pop transmitted from the hottest club in the Sega Genesis sound chip."

== Background and recording ==
Songwriter Sophie Allison said she had originally demoed the track as a pop song, and later asked producer BJ Burton to "destroy it".

== Composition and lyrics ==
The Fader described the track as "glitchy and warped". Guitar World said the song begins with "a collection of quirky chords", and later "explodes into a kaleidoscope of vocal hooks, catchy guitar parts and everything else we’ve come to expect from Allison."

Songwriter Sophie Allison told The Pitch: "Lyrically, it’s not very inspired, because it was just supposed to be kind of fun and wacky. It doesn’t feel like some really personal truths or something that I’m sharing with the world. It was my kind of writing for a rom-com."

== Music video ==
An animated music video was made for the track, which Guitar World described as "nostalgic [and] 8-bit/Nintendo Wii-inspired."

== Reception ==
The Fader called the track "a bold new direction in the indie singer-songwriter's catalog."
