= Soccer Mommy =

American musician (born 1997)

- Sophie Allison performing in 2026

Background information
- Also known as: Soccer Mommy
- Born: Sophia Regina Allison; May 27, 1997 (age 29); Zürich, Switzerland
- Origin: Nashville, Tennessee, U.S.
- Genres: Indie rock; indie pop; bubblegrunge; emo; grunge pop; bedroom pop (early); lo-fi (early)
- Occupations: Singer; songwriter
- Instruments: Vocals; guitar; drums; bass; saxophone
- Years active: 2015–present
- Labels: Fat Possum; Loma Vista; Concord; Orchid Tapes
- Website: Official website

Sophia Regina Allison (born May 27, 1997), better known by her stage name Soccer Mommy, is an American indie rock singer-songwriter from Nashville, Tennessee. Her music combines elements of 1990s alternative rock with the mainstream pop music of the 2000s, which is referred to by some journalists as "bubblegrunge". Additionally, she is known for her confessional lyrical style and personal subject matter.

Allison started her career by self-releasing music on Bandcamp in her late teenage years. Her debut studio album, Clean, was released in 2018. She has followed up by releasing another three albums: Color Theory (2020), Sometimes, Forever (2022), and Evergreen (2024), all of which have received positive reviews from critics. Throughout her career, she has toured with bands and artists including Stephen Malkmus, Mitski, Kacey Musgraves, Slowdive, Jay Som, Frankie Cosmos, Phoebe Bridgers, Snail Mail, Paramore, Liz Phair, and Vampire Weekend.

== Early life and education ==
Sophia Regina Allison was born in Zürich, Switzerland, on May 27, 1997 to Michelle (an elementary school teacher) and John Allison (a neuroscientist). Allison grew up in Nashville, Tennessee, where her parents had moved the family when she was a toddler. She attended Nashville School of the Arts, a specialty high school where she studied guitar and participated in the school's swing band. She quit the school band after her freshman year.

Having played guitar since the age of six, Allison began creating her own music. Avril Lavigne's 2004 album Under My Skin was the first album she ever owned. She formed her first band in fourth grade, collaborating with a neighbor who played drums. The band was called "Chemical X". Her neighbor's dad was an audio engineer and helped them record their original material.

She began posting home-recorded songs to Bandcamp as Soccer Mommy in 2015, during the summer when she was about to leave for college. The moniker was derived from her Twitter handle. She then attended New York University, where she studied music business and English at the Steinhardt School of Culture, Education, and Human Development. While in college, Allison played her first show as Soccer Mommy at the community art space Silent Barn in Bushwick, Brooklyn, and shortly after landed a recording contract with Fat Possum. She dropped out of college after two years in 2017 to return to Nashville and pursue her music career.

== Musical career ==
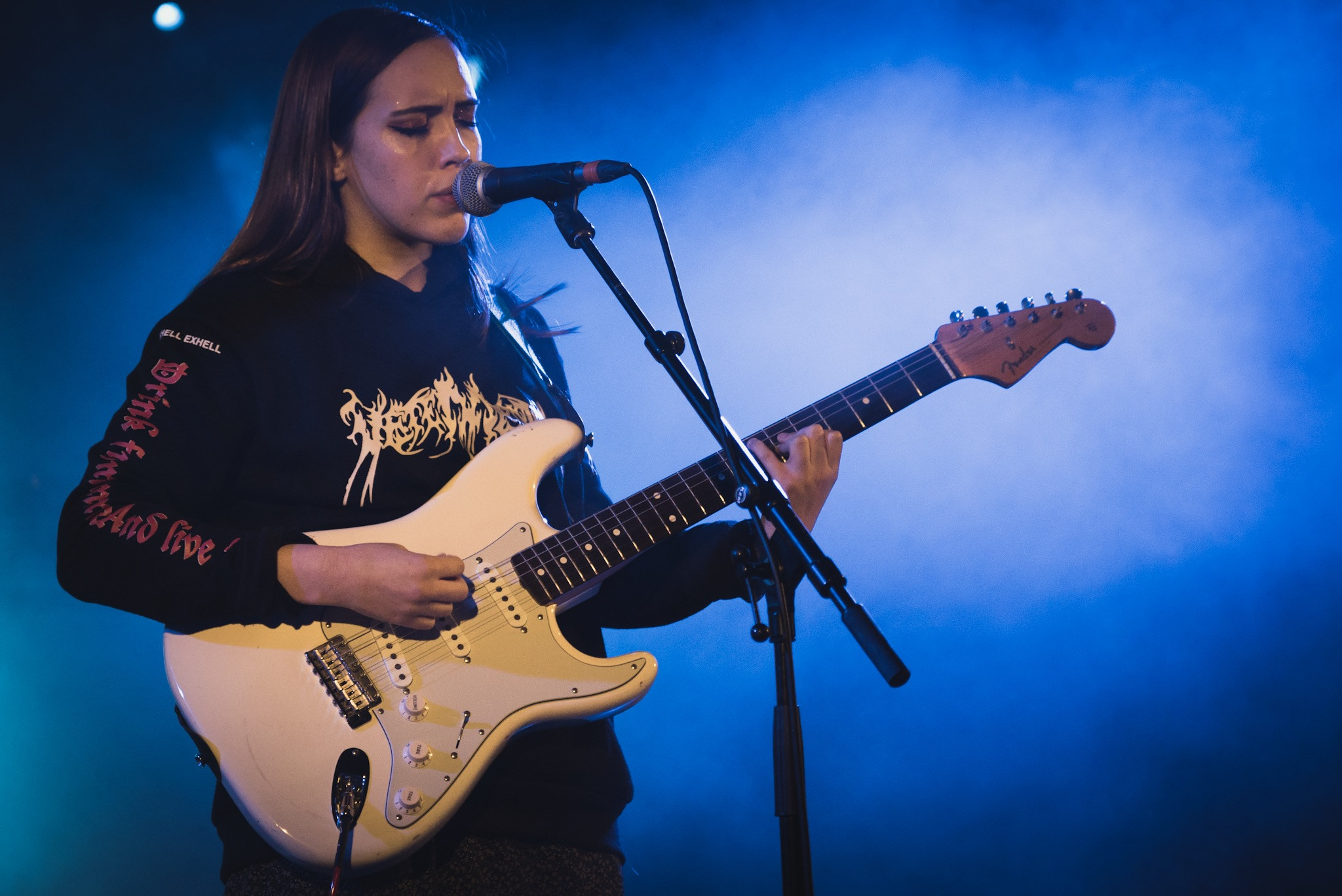
Allison performing at Rockaway Beach in 2018

Allison's first album as Soccer Mommy, For Young Hearts, was released in 2016 on Orchid Tapes. Her second album, Collection, was released in 2017 on Fat Possum Records. Her debut album proper, titled Clean, was released on March 2, 2018.

She joined Paramore and Foster the People on the first half of their 2018 summer tour. Soccer Mommy opened for Vampire Weekend in the fall. She also opened for a few shows for Wilco in the fall of 2019.

In February 2020, Allison played at one of Bernie Sanders' presidential rallies and endorsed his 2020 presidential campaign.

Allison's second album Color Theory was released on February 28, 2020 through Loma Vista Recordings. She was scheduled to play at American annual film and music festival South by Southwest the following month, though it was ultimately cancelled due to the COVID-19 pandemic. That May, she released the first volume of the Soccer Mommy & Friends Singles Series, the proceeds from which were donated to a pandemic relief fund operated by charity organization Oxfam. Collaborations on this project included one with singer-songwriter Jay Som, who recorded a cover of "Lucy". Other collaborators included Andrew VanWyngarden of MGMT, Beabadoobee and Beach Bunny.

She eventually toured the US in the fall of 2021 to support Color Theory. She toured North America again in 2022, playing rescheduled dates in Montreal and Toronto. She performed on WNRN in March 2022, where she played new material. She also performed on The Tonight Show Starring Jimmy Fallon the following month.

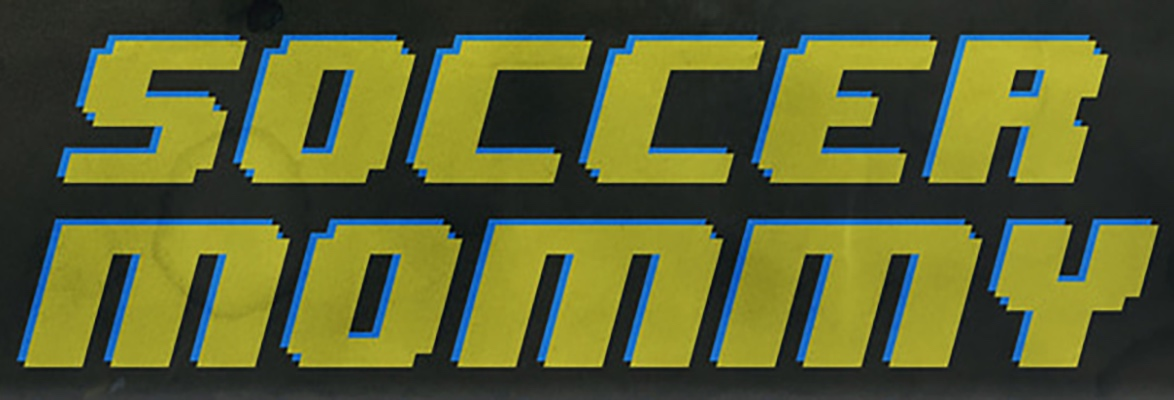
The Soccer Mommy logo used during the Color Theory album cycle

Allison's third album Sometimes, Forever was released on June 24, 2022, again through Loma Vista. She did not immediately tour to support the album following its release, recalling: "I was just trying to be very mindful of where I was at mentally and take a step back from a lot of stuff." She eventually toured Europe and North America late in the year. She also performed the tracks "Shotgun" and "Feel It All the Time" on Jimmy Kimmel Live! in August of that year.

She toured in support of American indie rock band the National in the spring of 2023.

Allison played several solo shows in early 2024, during which she debuted new material. Her fourth album Evergreen was released on October 25, 2024, once again through Loma Vista. She toured globally in 2025 to promote the album.

Allison will tour the US with Snail Mail in the fall of 2026. Support acts will include Brennan Wedl and Scarlet Rae.

== Artistry ==
=== Musical style and classification ===
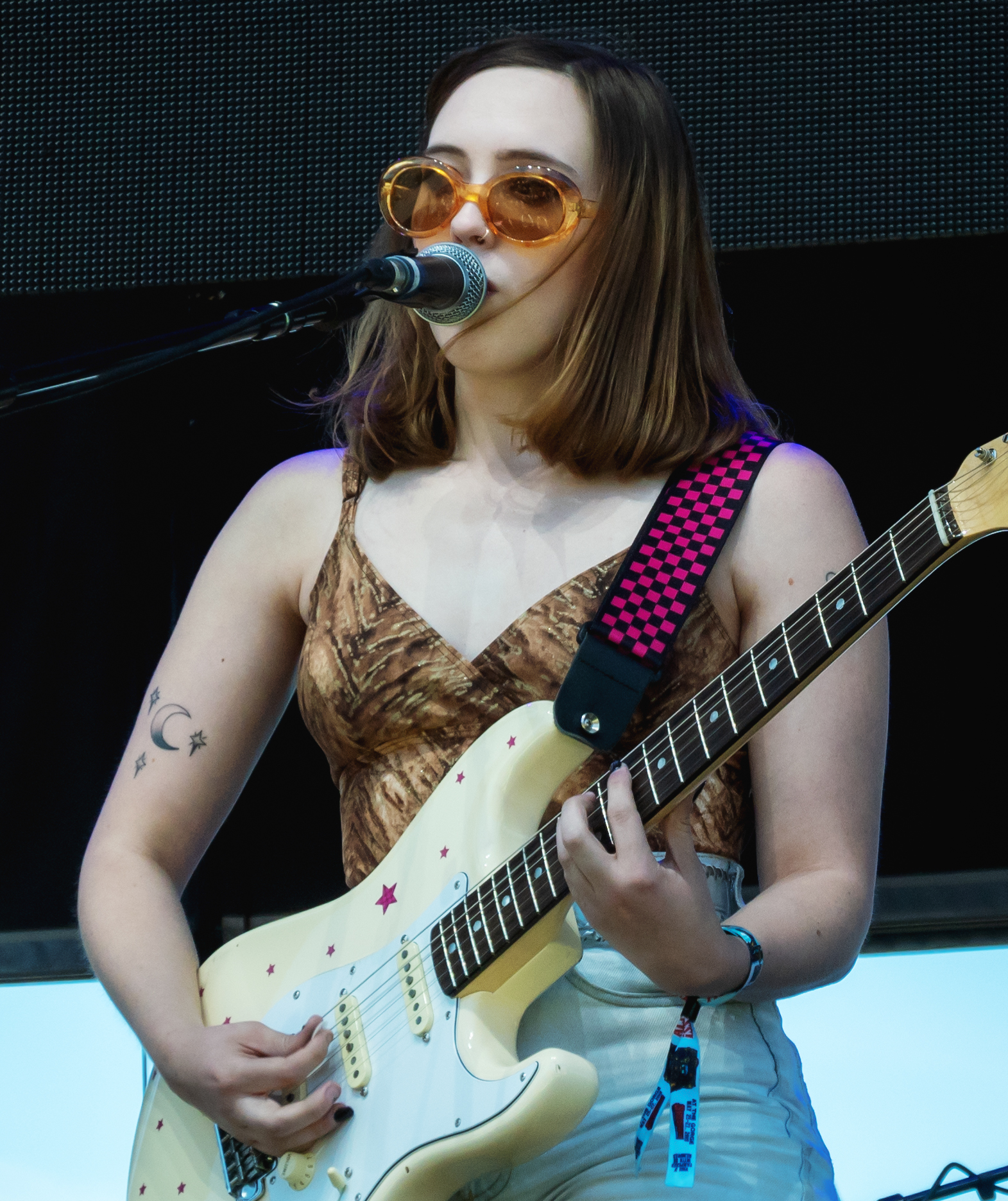
Allison performing in Redmond, Washington in 2018

Allison is an indie rock/pop artist, and her style fuses various different elements of several popular music subgenres. She is primarily known for combining 2000s pop-influenced hooks with the aesthetics of 1990s alternative rock. Emma Bowers of Nylon characterized the style as "mesh[ing] turn of the millennium grunge-pop and the tender, confessional songwriting of the late 2010s." Allison herself has stated that her music is influenced by pop music and that she strives for catchy elements in her songs. The style also contains elements of grunge, leading some to categorize early career efforts such as Clean under the fusion genre bubblegrunge. Allison's music has additionally been labeled as emo. Fashion magazine Paper described her material as "intense emo melodrama."

Allison's early EPs are considered to represent the bedroom pop and lo-fi genres, and featured stripped down instrumentation and production. Her 2017 compilation album Collection featured a full band. Clean introduced elements of power pop on some tracks, such as "Cool" and "Your Dog". Her later albums are considered to split the difference between the shoegaze and dream pop sounds. Beginning with Color Theory, she began to employ increased experiemention, incorporating elements such as dissonance and noise. According to Pitchfork, "Allison wears dissonance like camouflage, disguising the darkest dreams with bubblegum hooks and lacing sugar-coated vocals with salt. The contradiction disguises a cry for help; sweet melodies give cover to sour sentiment."

Allison's music is heavily guitar-driven and considered by some to sound "fuzzy". Online music magazine The Line of Best Fit stated that "a Soccer Mommy record is best paired with a poster-covered room, an old CD player, beat-up Converse and a worn-out journal." Jenn Pelly of Pitchfork said "Even when Allison’s strummy music evokes a coffee house open-mic, though, there’s an edge to it." A writer at The Singles Jukebox stated the opinion that "there’s always sadness and a fierce intensity lurking at the corners of her work, but her urgency and playfulness can be such effective counterpoints."

Her material has drawn comparisons to the works of American singer-songwriters such as Liz Phair and Fiona Apple. More specifically, Rob Sheffield of Rolling Stone compared her guitar playing style to the works of American rock musician Evan Dando and singer-songwriter Juliana Hatfield.

=== Songwriting process ===
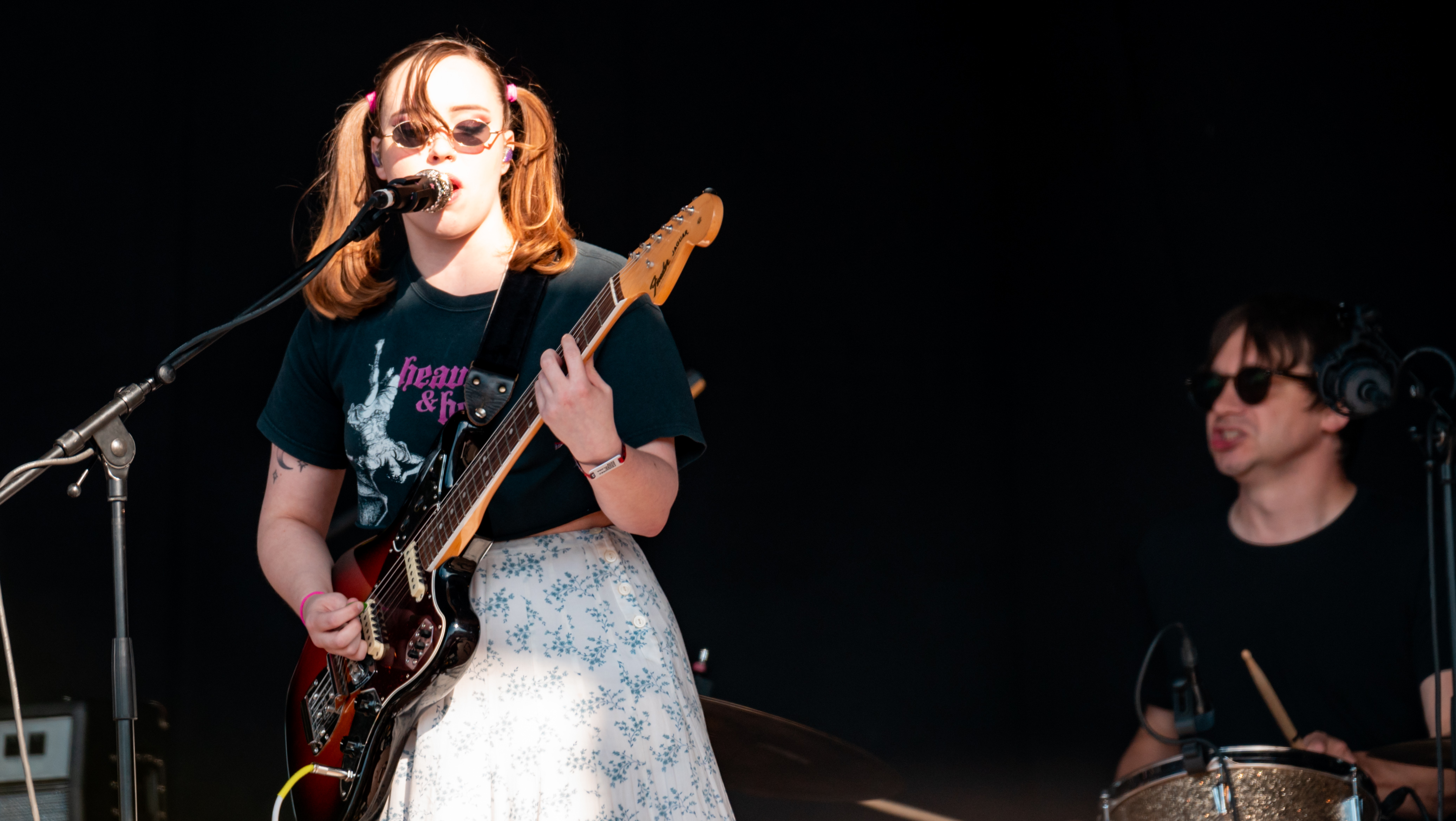
Allison performing in 2019

Allison has stated that she writes all of her songs on acoustic guitar in their initial stages, stating the desire for the material to be able to stand on its own in a "stripped down" state. She told NPR that this strategy allows her "to build some other stuff around it and make it into a, quote unquote, real song." She also said: "The guitar and vocals are just what I could play alone – like if for some reason the band wasn't with me and I was going to play a solo set."

She said that she gets her ideas for melodies and hooks by simply playing guitar and "exploring chord progressions." She occasionally employs alternate and open guitar tunings, stating that this technique requires her to "rethink" the fretboard and experiment when she feels her material is becoming formulaic. She stated that she determines the ordering of her live setlists based on the tunings of the songs in order to avoid having to constantly change tunings between each song. She also incorporates jazz chords into her writing.

Allison has also said her songs are not written with live performances in mind, which has occasionally resulted in difficulties when rehearsing with the full band: "[It] can be super annoying at times. There's definitely times that I've written songs and it's come time to figure out how we're going to perform them and it takes a lot more work. But mostly it's fine. I don't like to write with any thoughts outside of: This is the core of this song."

=== Vocal style ===
Regarding Allison's vocal style, Nashville Scene said her voice was "dreamy [and] ethereal." AllMusic stated that "the delicate, whispery nature of [her] voice combined with the sweetness of her melodies often gives [her] music a floating quality." Pitchfork said her melodies were often "unpredictable" and that "they often resemble counterpoint written to a root melody that’s been erased." A different writer at the same publication said that "her hazy singing can be conversational and appealingly flat. She sounds like a person you might know." Philadelphia-based newspaper The Triangle wrote that her voice was "not showy at all, but rather drawn back and modest." Variety said her singing style was "sweetly half-narcotized," and that it "occupie[d] an unexpected middle ground" between Bilinda Butcher of My Bloody Valentine and Nina Persson of the Cardigans.

=== Lyrical themes ===
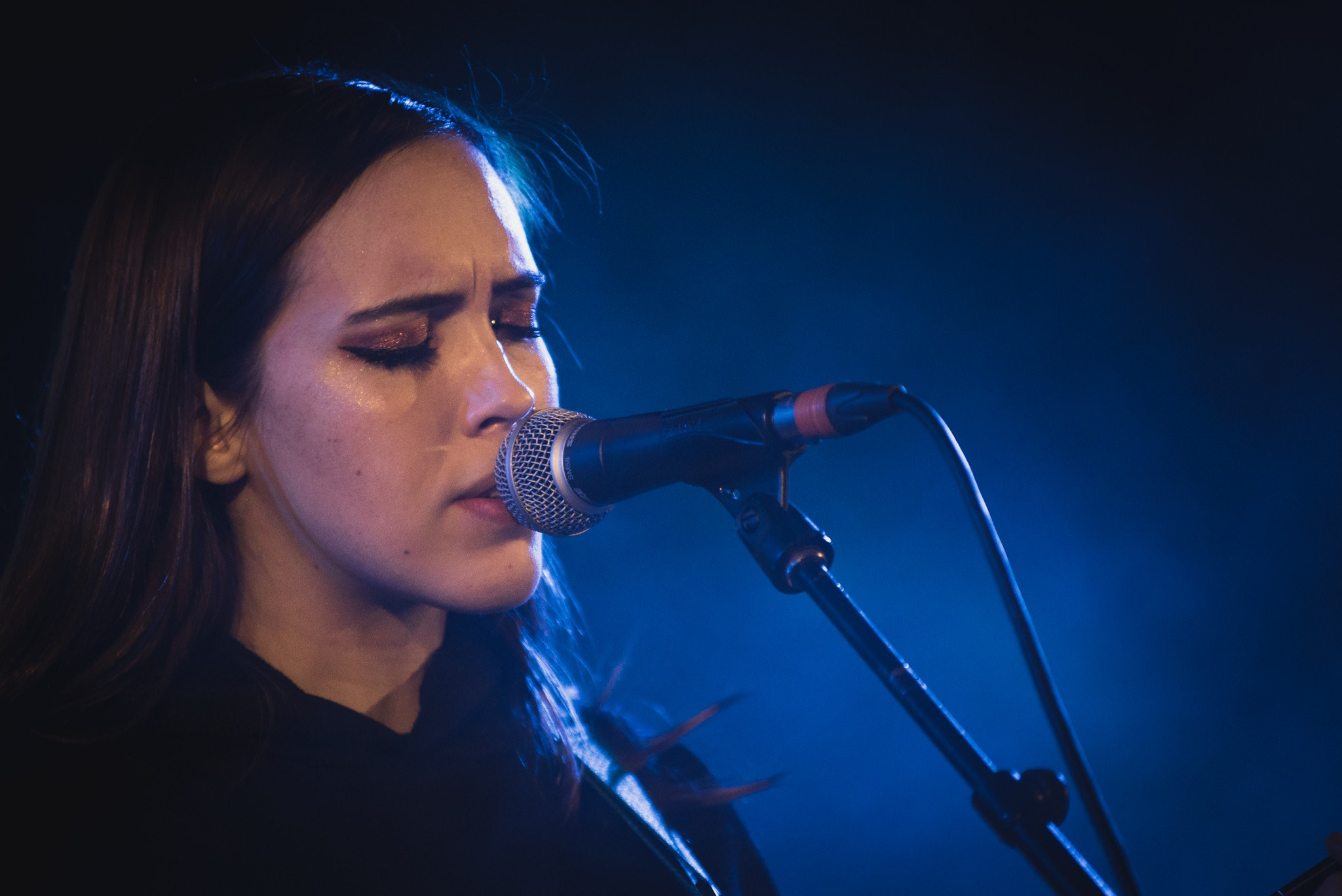
Allison performing in Rockaway Beach in 2018

Allison is recognized for her deeply confessional and "conversational" lyrical style. AllMusic described her lyrics as reading "quietly tormented". NME said her songs are "are akin to private musings in her journal." Common themes explored by Allison in her early songs included lovesickness, power dynamics, psychological abuse, self-doubt and adolescence. British online newspaper The Independent wrote in a review of Clean that "Allison is an expert at introspection and the teenage experience," while stating the opinion that her songs incorporate "universally applicable themes." Mike Katzif of NPR said that "in many Soccer Mommy songs, Allison sings with a captivating sense of yearning as she ruminates on the wounded ache of love, the uncertainty of youth and restless wanderlust." Allison's lyrics are also known to incorporate dark comedy and self-deprecation. Variety described these lyrical passages as "self-lacerating". Later releases such as Sometimes, Forever and Evergreen explore heavier topics such as grief, depression, suicidal ideation and self-harm. She told Pitchfork: "The anxiety of approaching death haunts me a lot. It’s this weird struggle between being attracted to it and scared of it, trying to find the balance of beauty in life and fear."

She said in an interview with NME that although her lyrics were deeply personal and that fans may think that they "know" her through her music, the lyrics are in fact vague in nature. She believes her lyrics are primarily driven by her self-perceived tendency to "just overanalyze everything". She explained: "I spend a lot of time thinking, which naturally feeds into songwriting. By the time I sit down to write, I’ve already processed a lot of thoughts and ideas." She told Pitchfork: "Writing is like bleeding—it’s something that just comes out. A lot of times I don’t even know where a thought is going when I start a song. It’s almost like discovering something that was bubbling in me. It’s a personal drive to find out what the fuck is wrong with me. I can’t help it. Honestly, there’s a possibility that it wasn’t the best idea to expose a lot of things about myself. Maybe in the future that will affect things. For now, though, I already did it."

Regarding her opinion on the application of the "sad girl" label to her music due to the melancholy nature of her lyrics, she stated that "there are positives and negatives." She continued: "It has brought attention to great music, but categorization can be limiting—especially for women. It defines artists by gender rather than just their work. It can also make it harder for those who don’t fit the current trend to break through. While it has given visibility to confessional, emotional songwriting, it can also box artists into a narrow space."

Additionally, she also incorporates imagery from Christian myths into her lyrics despite not following the religion, and has expressed a fascination with the themes found within them. She stated the opinion that "the ideas of good and evil and light and dark and purity are beautiful in a literary sense."

=== Influences ===
Allison cites musicians Natalie Imbruglia, Mitski, Slowdive, Sonic Youth, The Breeders, the Chicks, Taylor Swift, Hillary Duff and Avril Lavigne, as well as the cities of Nashville and New York, as influences. She said to British culture magazine Wonderland in 2017: "I guess I listen to a lot of indie rock to get inspiration for my music, but I really listen to all genres pretty much. Just because I kind of like everything." Speaking of how physical location influenced her songwriting, she said: "Living in different places changes what I draw from as metaphor and imagery. When I lived in New York, I used the city to describe emotions and moments. Now, having easy access to nature and a more relaxed lifestyle brings me peace, which influences my writing. Location can really shape the lyrical and emotional tone of a song."

Allison has also expressed appreciation for 1980s alternative rock bands such as the Cure, Siouxsie and the Banshees, and the Jesus and Mary Chain, which Pitchfork states "hit the sweet spot between dreaminess and urgency." She has cited American alternative rock band Wilco's 2001 album Yankee Hotel Foxtrot as among her favorites. Additionally, she is a country music listener, telling Rolling Stone that "it’s so goofy, but it speaks to you, especially when you’re from the South." She has consequently incorporated elements of the genre into her music.

She has stated that her lyrics occasionally draw inspiration from literature and poetry.

=== Aesthetic and fashion ===
Like her music, Allison's fashion stylings draw heavily from rock and pop aesthetics of the 1990s and 2000s. She is most notably known for her "black cat-eye" winged eyeliner style, which both Pitchfork and Rolling Stone have called her "signature". She uses liquid eyeliner for her look. Early in her career she was known for wearing choker necklaces and platform boots, which Stereogum compared to the fashion style of Avril Lavigne, and described as "not peddling nostalgia so much as proudly showing off formative influences." During the Color Theory album cycle, she was known for wearing her hair in pigtails. She told Rolling Stone she has retired this particular look: "I was in a certain head space to be doing that all the time."

== Equipment ==
Allison typically plays modified budget Fender guitars, opining that "cheap guitars do not necessarily sound bad or feel bad." She owns a Fender Lead III and a Mexican Stratocaster. Additionally, she has played Fender Jaguars, Jazzmasters and Mustangs at various points in her career. She has also played Novo and Guild guitars. She uses various effects pedals to add reverberation and create a sense of ambience. She also owns and plays a Gibson LG-2 acoustic guitar. She favors Fender amplifiers due to their clean tones and because they "sound very full [and] not brittle" to her. In the studio, she tracks with a Fender Twin, and uses a Fender Hot Rod DeVille during live performances. She uses an array of guitar pedals. She has said her favorite pedal is the Météore from Caroline.

== Other projects ==
Touring guitarist Julian Powell releases music under the name "MG".

== Critical reception ==
Allison is considered to be among the most prominent and critically acclaimed indie rock singer-songwriters of the 2020s by numerous publications. In 2017, Pitchfork stated the opinion that she was "among the relative few who have built a real following" through the online music distributor Bandcamp. Online music database AllMusic stated that Allison was "one of the stronger '90s revivalists in 2020s indie". Now-defunct magazine Guitar Player called her "a darling of the indie rock scene." Rolling Stone said she was "one of indie rock's most intensely beloved singer-songwriters." In 2021, Guitar World called her "one of today’s most formidable indie-rock guitar stars." In 2024, music magazine The Line of Best Fit wrote that she "has become a go-to artist for sad girls, overthinkers, and indieheads everywhere." That same year, British culture magazine Wonderland stated she was among "the most critically decorated and understated songwriters of her generation."

== Public image ==
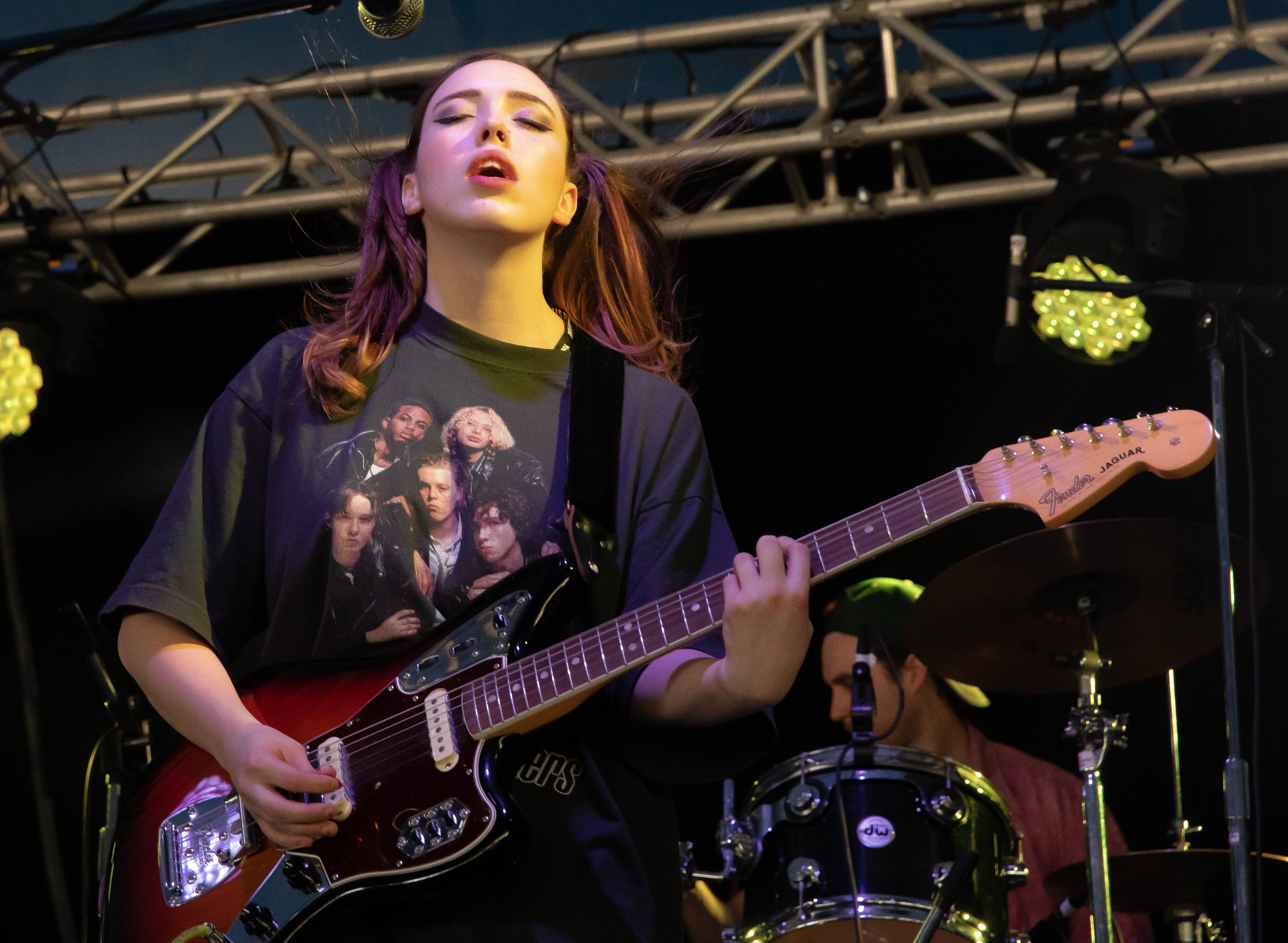
Allison performing in Sydney, Australia in 2019

Allison has spoken extensively regarding her personal value of privacy in the music industry, stating the belief that artists should not be expected or required to "disclose very personal, private shit" in their work. She said: "If you want to be open in your music, it doesn’t mean you have to be open in your life. I’m a private person. I don’t even tell my friends things. Music has always been my outlet for my emotions. You can have this private thing that you are also happy to have people hear. I hate the idea that you can’t have both. You can have a distance that makes it still relatable music, but it doesn’t turn your life into other people’s interest reading."

Early in her career, when asked by British lifestyle magazine Dazed how she felt about the increased attention towards her as an independent artist, she said: "It’s really weird because I’m just a person, and people kind of forget that sometimes – less people in the industry, more fans. It becomes like you’re a public figure. People don’t think about the way they say things to you and how it’s creepy or not okay. I figure a lot of women artists deal with this more than men, but people being in love with you or thinking you’re so gorgeous. It’s really weird and can be uncomfortable. At the same time, it’s really great to have people be in love with your music and be supportive of it." She also told The News & Observer in 2018 that she had personally called out a fan who had shouted objectifying comments towards her during a live performance, saying “if you want to yell out a song, I can live with that, but don’t get personal."

Allison stopped using social media during the COVID-19 pandemic, with the band's online accounts now being operated by her management. She stated her Instagram page "felt like a business", with her interactions on the platform being solely limited to people in the music scene. She explained: "It wasn’t the same as having an Instagram where you post selfies and your friends comment, 'Cute!', you know? I just didn’t want to do it anymore." She told online music magazine The Line of Best Fit that this decision ultimately improved her fan interactions at shows. She continued: "I don’t enjoy being a public figure and living my life through that lens. The people I hang out with, they’re my friends from high school – I don’t wake up and go about my day as Soccer Mommy." On the topic of work-life balance in the music industry, she explained to New York-based music magazine The Fader that "at a certain point, you hit this wall where it’s like, 'I can either spend most of my time being myself, or being the artist.' [...] You hit this split where you can’t hold onto both lives tightly without losing one of them. I guess it does correlate to success – being more involved and more excited about doing lots of fashion stuff and knowing other celebrities and making connections and networking – but it’s just not for me. It’s just not what I want. So, if that means my growth will be slower, that’s just... It is what it is."

Allison has stated that she believes she will eventually change the name of the project, which is derived from an intentionally humorous Twitter handle she had used previously. She said to Rolling Stone: "As I get older, I'm sure eventually it'll change. It’s not like I’m going to be forever going down as Soccer Mommy. It’s a little youthful. I’m, like, picturing 40-year-old me: 'Yeah, I'm Soccer Mommy!'"

== Personal life ==
Allison is bisexual. She is in a relationship with her touring guitarist Julian Powell, with whom she owns a house. She owns two cats and frequently has photos of them posted to her Instagram page.

She told The Independent in 2022 that she holds the view that "there are many gods or ideas that we can interact with if we choose to." Specifically, she has expressed belief in supernatural things such as magic, witchcraft and the spiritual world.

Allison is an avid fan of horror films. In an interview with BrooklynVegan, she cited the films Halloween, Suspiria, Resident Evil, Jennifer’s Body, House of the Devil, Let The Right One In and The Thing as among her favorite entries in the genre. In 2025, she introduced a screening of Jennifer's Body at the Belcourt Theatre in Nashville. She is also a fan of science fiction media and the Pokémon video game franchise. She called Buffy the Vampire Slayer her "favorite show ever".

When asked in 2018 by now-defunct Nebraskan alternative newspaper The Reader what her "favorite substance" was, she said Malibu so they could keep the discussion "user-friendly."

Allison is a self-described amateur astronomer and owns a telescope.

== Band members ==
- Sophie Allison - vocals, guitar
- Julian Powell - guitar
- Rodrigo Avendano - guitar, keyboards
- Nickolas Widener - bass
- Rollum Haas - drums, drum machines

== Discography ==
Soccer Mommy discography
- Studio albums: 4
- EPs: 5
- Compilation albums: 2
- Singles: 27
- Music videos: 13
- Demo albums: 1

=== Studio albums ===
List of studio albums, with selected information
Title	Details	Peak chart positions						
Title	Details	US	US Alt.	US Heat.	US Rock	AUS Hit.	SCO	UK
Clean	Released: March 2, 2018; Label: Fat Possum; Formats: LP, CD, digital download, streaming	—	—	—	—	20	—	—
Color Theory	Released: February 28, 2020; Label: Loma Vista; Formats: CD, LP, cassette, digital download, streaming	142	7	2	22	—	52	—
Sometimes, Forever	Released: June 24, 2022; Label: Loma Vista; Formats: LP, CD, cassette, digital download, streaming	137	14	1	—	7	14	95
Evergreen	Released: October 25, 2024; Label: Loma Vista; Formats: LP, CD, cassette, digital download, streaming	—	—	—	—	—	—	—
"—" denotes a recording that did not chart or was not released in that territory.

=== Demo albums ===
Title	Details	Peak chart positions	
Title	Details	US Heat.	US Indie
For Young Hearts	Released: June 17, 2016; Label: Orchid Tapes; Formats: Digital download	5	30

=== Compilation albums ===
Title	Details
Collection	Released: August 4, 2017; Label: Fat Possum; Formats: CD, LP, cassette, digital download
Soccer Mommy & Friends Singles Series	Released: July 2, 2020; Label: Loma Vista; Formats: Digital download

=== Extended plays ===
Title	Details
Songs for the Recently Sad	Released: September 25, 2015; Label: Self-released; Formats: Digital download
Songs from My Bedroom	Released: December 11, 2015; Label: Self-released; Formats: Digital download
Songs from My Bedroom (pt. 2)	Released: January 26, 2016; Label: Self-released; Formats: Digital download
Soccer Mommy on Audiotree Live	Released: October 10, 2017; Label: Audiotree Music; Formats: Digital download
Karaoke Night	Released: September 15, 2023; Label: Loma Vista; Format: LP, CD, digital download, streaming

=== Singles ===
List of singles
Title	Year	Peak chart positions		Album
Title	Year	US AAA	UK Sales	Album
"Last Girl" / "Be Seeing You"	2017	—	—	Non-album singles
"Your Dog"	2018	—	—	Clean
"Cool"	2018	—	—	Clean
"Scorpio Rising"	2018	—	—	Clean
"Mass Grave" (with Health)	2018	—	—	Disco4: Part I
"Henry" / "I'm on Fire"	2018	—	10	Non-album singles
"Blossom (Demo)" / "I'll Be Seeing You"	2019	—	—	Non-album singles
"Feed"	2019	—	—	The Turning (Original Motion Picture Soundtrack)
"Lucy"	2019	—	—	Color Theory
"Yellow Is the Color of Her Eyes"	2019	—	—	Color Theory
"Circle the Drain"	2020	18	—	Color Theory
"Bloodstream"	2020	—	—	Color Theory
"Crawling in My Skin" / "Circle the Drain"	2020	—	—	Color Theory
"Rom Com 2004"	2021	—	—	Non-album singles
"Rom Com 2021" (with Kero Kero Bonito)	2021	—	—	Non-album singles
"Shotgun"	2022	13	—	Sometimes, Forever
"Unholy Affliction"	2022	—	—	Sometimes, Forever
"Bones"	2022	—	—	Sometimes, Forever
"Newdemo"	2022	—	—	Sometimes, Forever
"Lose You" (with Bully)	2023	13	—	Lucky for You
"Soak Up the Sun"	2023	—	—	Karaoke Night
"I'm Only Me When I'm with You"	2023	—	—	Karaoke Night
"Lost"	2024	—	—	Evergreen
"M"	2024	—	—	Evergreen
"Driver"	2024	32	—	Evergreen
"Abigail"	2024	—	—	Evergreen
"Rings of Saturn"	2026	—	—	TBA
"—" denotes a recording that did not chart or was not released in that territory.

=== Music videos ===
Title	Year	Director
"Allison"	2017	Harry James Clifford
"Inside Out"	2017	Harry James Clifford
"Your Dog"	2018	Weird Life Films
"Cool"	2018	Ambar Navarro
"Scorpio Rising"	2018	Jonny Look
"Yellow Is the Color of Her Eyes"	2019	Alex Ross Perry
"Circle the Drain"	2020	Atiba Jefferson
"Bloodstream"	2020	Bella Clark and Haven Butler
"Rom Com 2004"	2021	Fustic Studio
"Shotgun"	2022	Kevin Lombardo
"Bones"	2022	Alex Ross Perry
"Feel It All the Time"	2022	Zav Magasis
"Driver"	2024	Twin Lantern
"Abigail"	2024	Leonel Montero

== Awards and nominations ==
Year	Association	Category	Nominated work	Result	Ref
2021	Libera Awards	Libera Award for Best Alternative Rock Record	Color Theory	Nominated	
2021	Libera Awards	Creative Packaging	Color Theory	Won	
2022	Grammy Awards	Best Boxed or Special Limited Edition Package	Color Theory	Nominated	
2023	Libera Awards	Best Rock Record	Sometimes, Forever	Nominated	
