= Driver (Soccer Mommy song) =

Song by Soccer Mommy

from the album Evergreen
- Released: September 10, 2024
- Genre: Rock, indie rock, hard rock
- Length: 4:12
- Label: Loma Vista Recordings
- Songwriter: Sophie Allison
- Producer: Ben H. Allen III

"Driver" is a song by American indie rock singer-songwriter Soccer Mommy, released as the third single from her fourth studio album Evergreen on September 10, 2024. She announced an international headlining tour in tandem with the single's release.

== Composition and lyrics ==
Compared to the two acoustic guitar-driven tracks that precede it on the album, the song "sees Soccer Mommy demonstrate her signature knack for penning a rock-driven earworm," according to DIY. Rolling Stone described "Driver" as sounding "hypnotic", and NME said the song was "an atmospheric ode to indecision and compromise." WXPN described the track as lyrically "goofy and heartfelt" and said the song's guitar work "mimic[s] the revving of engines." Songwriter Sophie Allison said about the song's meaning: "It's a love song that’s really about someone being there for you in spite of your shortcomings. It’s more light hearted than some of the other songs I’ve put out this year, using my distractedness as a bit of a punchline."
