= Collection (Soccer Mommy album) =

Compilation album by Soccer Mommy
- Released: August 4, 2017
- Recorded: 2016
- Genres: Indie rock; lo-fi
- Length: 29:56
- Label: Fat Possum

Soccer Mommy chronology
For Young Hearts (2016)	Collection (2017)	Clean (2018)

Collection is a 2017 compilation album by American indie rock singer-songwriter Sophie Allison, under the moniker Soccer Mommy. It is made up of retooled versions of her bedroom pop recordings originally posted on Bandcamp. The release was preceded by a music video for "Allison".

== Music and lyrics ==
AllMusic stated that "while Allison's introspective, guitar-centric songcraft carries a certain intimate, lo-fi quality, much of the material here falls on the more expansive end of expectations for the style." The Fader said the music on Collection was "hinged on the anxious intimacy of someone who has been up all night, thinking about love." The album's lyrics explore themes including emotional abandonment, heartbreak and regret. Billboard stated that the album was "ideal for fans of Jay Som, Mitski and Waxahatchee."

== Critical reception ==
According to the review aggregator Metacritic, Collection received "generally favorable reviews" based on a weighted average score of 75 out of 100 from nine critic scores. Writing for Pitchfork, Evan Rytlewski gave the album a 6.7 out of 10, praising the artist's elaboration of her bedroom pop recordings but criticizing repetitive songwriting and a lack of experience at recording. Marissa Lorusso of NPR's Songs We Love chose "Out Worn" to spotlight, praising Soccer Mommy's growth as a songwriter. Hana Kaplan of Paste gave it a 7.9 out of 10, summing up that it's a "refreshing look at your past, a tender look at the moments that made you, you". AllMusic gave the album three and a half stars and wrote that it was "enough to make the promise of the young Nashville native evident."

== Track listing ==
All songs written by Sophie Allison.

Side A

1. "Allison" – 2:39
2. "Try" – 2:59
3. "Death by Chocolate" – 4:12
4. "Out Worn" – 4:35

Side B

5. "3 AM at a Party" – 2:33
6. "Inside Out" – 4:56
7. "Benadryl Dreams" – 4:02
8. "Waiting for Cars" – 3:56

== Personnel ==
Credits are adapted from the Collection liner notes.

- Sophie Allison – guitar, vocals
- Emily Allison – artwork
- Thomas Borrelli – drums, backing vocals
- Harry James Clifford – interior photos
- Jacob Corenflos – bass guitar
- Justin Fargiano – cover photo
- Clay Jones – mastering
- Casey Weissbuch – synthesizer on "Waiting for Cars"
- Kelton Young – lead guitar
