= Lost (Soccer Mommy song) =

Song by Soccer Mommy
- Genre: Acoustic music

"Lost" is a song by American indie rock singer-songwriter Soccer Mommy, released as the lead single from her fourth studio album Evergreen on June 6, 2024. It is the album's opening track.

== Composition and lyrics ==
Nashville Scene referred to "Lost" as "a hauntingly beautiful song that feels like a soundtrack." American news website Consequence called the song's arrangement "warm [and] dazzling". According to songwriter Sophie Allison, the song "feels like something new and something old at the same time. It’s a song that’s full of reflection and I wanted its production to really capture that feeling." She expressed the belief that the song "really shines" in the context of a solo show setting. The song's lyrics deal with the topics of grief and regret. Allison said the song was "very close to [her] heart."

== Music video ==
A lyric video was released for the song, which was directed by Anna Pollack. Rolling Stone said that in the video, songwriter Sophie Allison "wanders through a landscape, avoids a lake, smells yellow flowers, and ignores a cute, prowling cat nearby."
