= Bubblegrunge =

Genre of music

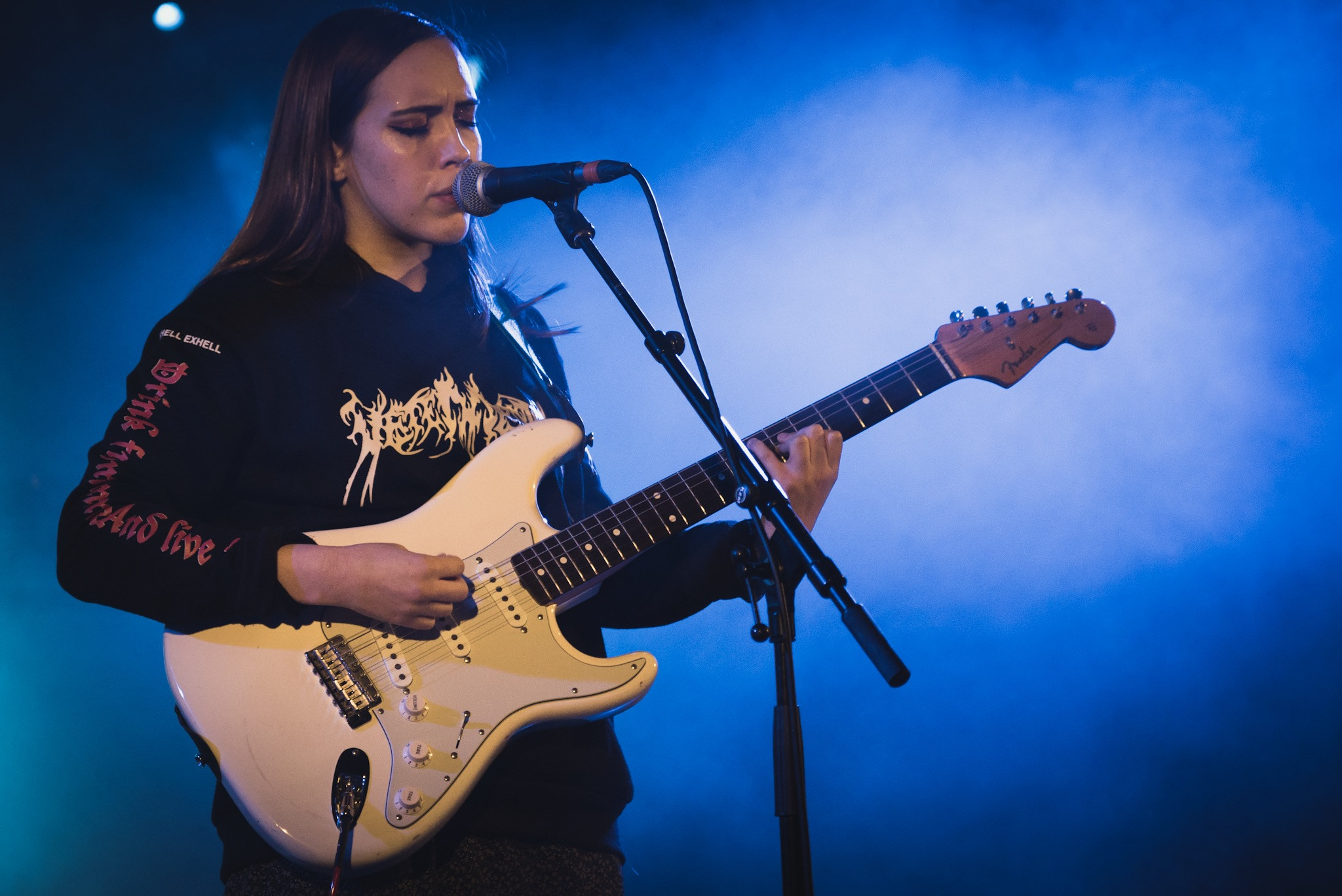
- Bubblegrunge artist Soccer Mommy
- Stylistic origins: Grunge, alternative rock, pop music, bubblegum pop, lo-fi
- Cultural origins: 1990s

Bubblegrunge is a fusion microgenre that combines elements of grunge and pop music. The genre's name is a portmanteau of the terms "bubblegum music" and "grunge". Practitioners of the style include Soccer Mommy, Mannequin Pussy, Slow Pulp and Ovlov.

== Characteristics ==
Bubblegrunge fuses the catchy, upbeat melodies of bubblegum pop with the distorted guitars, heavy drums and raw, emotional vocals of grunge. NPR described the style as "a blend of bedroom pop and '90s alternative rock". It often features confessional, introspective lyrics on love, heartbreak and self-discovery, wrapped in a nostalgic, slightly melancholy edge.

== History ==
The term "bubblegrunge" can be traced back to the early 1990s, when it was used to describe bands such as The Lemonheads and Collective Soul.

== Etymology ==
Although in use by critics in the 1990s, awareness of the term increased with its inclusion in the 2021 edition of Spotify Wrapped.
