= Rings of Saturn (1981 video game) =

1981 video game

- Developer: Level-10
- Publisher: Level-10
- Platform: Apple II
- Release: NA: 31 August 1981

Rings of Saturn is a 1981 video game published by Level-10 for the Apple II.

== Contents ==
Rings of Saturn is game in which the player is the captain of the spaceship Goya, and must fly through the A Ring of Saturn, to bring the crew of a crippled ship back to the base.

== Reception ==
Forrest Johnson reviewed Rings of Saturn in The Space Gamer No. 46. Johnson commented that "Rings of Saturn is an innovative game, and it will have novelty value for the arcade denizen."

Rob Greenberg reviewed Rings of Saturn for Pegasus magazine and stated that "Overall, the game is very good. It makes extensive use of high resolution graphics (forward and rear view screens, long-range scan of Saturn's rings), and should remain challenging for a long time."
