= Scorpio Rising (Soccer Mommy song) =

Single by Soccer Mommy

from the album Clean
- Released: July 16, 2018
- Studio: Alex the Great Recording (Nashville, Tennessee)
- Length: 4:43
- Label: Fat Possum
- Songwriter: Sophie Allison
- Producer: Gabe Wax

Soccer Mommy singles chronology
"Cool" (2018)	"Scorpio Rising" (2018)	"Henry" (2018)

"Scorpio Rising" is a 2018 song by American indie rock singer-songwriter Sophie Allison, under the moniker Soccer Mommy. It was released as the third and final single from her debut studio album Clean.

== Composition and lyrics ==
Stereogum and The Fader both called the song the "centerpiece" of the album. The song continues the topic of puppy love explored in many of the album's other songs. Allison stated that the track was the most personal on the album. She told Consequence: "This song is the climax of the record. It’s this huge moment where I realize that while I’ve been trying to be cool and detached, I’ve become attached — and now I’m about to lose everything because I’m pretending to be something I’m not." Musically, the song is described as "slow-building". The Fader said Allison's voice makes use of dynamics on the track, saying that it "crescendo[s] in tandem with her radiant guitars."

== Reception ==
The Fader referred to the line "I’m just a victim of changing planets / A Scorpio rising and my parents" as "a perfect shout-along lyric, one that feels both timeless and extremely of-the-moment." American singer-songwriter Phoebe Bridgers listed "Scorpio Rising" as among her favorite songs in a 2018 listicle published by The Line of Best Fit. She said that "the lyrics are so casually fucked up and sad, [...] and dropping the phrase 'Scorpio Rising' into a song is the most next level, amazing thing."
