= Scarlet Rae =

American musician

Scarlet Rae is an American musician. She is the stepdaughter of the British-American musician, Slash.

== Discography ==
=== EPs ===
- No Heavy Goodbyes (2025)

=== Singles ===
- The Reason I Could Sleep Forever (2025)
- Bleu (2024)
- Seems Like Forever (2022)
