= Yellow Is the Color of Her Eyes =

Single by Soccer Mommy

from the album Color Theory
- Released: November 19, 2019
- Genre: Indie rock
- Length: 7:15
- Label: Fat Possum
- Songwriter: Sophie Allison

"Yellow Is the Color of Her Eyes" is a song by American singer-songwriter Sophie Allison, known professionally as Soccer Mommy. The song serves as a single from her second studio album Color Theory. With a duration of over seven minutes long, is one of the lengthiest tracks in Allison's discography.

== Composition and lyrics ==
New York-based music magazine The Fader described the track as a "slow burn". The song features a harp performance by American musician Mary Lattimore as well as an extended instrumental solo section. Songwriter Sophie Allison emphasized the song's importance to her and explained its meaning: "The song was inspired by a time when I was on the road constantly and I felt like I was losing time—specifically with my mother. It’s also a song that I feel really showcases my writing when it comes to instrumentation, so it’s one that makes me really proud."

== Music video ==
A music video was created for the song, which was directed by American filmmaker and actor Alex Ross Perry. The Fader stated that the video "has Allison saturated in the titular hue, one that oscillates between sunny and oppressive." Flood Magazine said the video "follows Sophie Allison as she makes her way from a sun-soaked Spanish-style interior to an equally jaundiced ocean-side exterior. There’s really just a lot of yellow." Perry stated that the video's visual style drew influence from the films Breaking the Waves, Eternal Sunshine of the Spotless Mind and Inception.
