= Rings of Saturn (song) =

Single by Soccer Mommy
- Released: September 17, 2026
- Genre: Indie rock
- Label: Fat Possum
- Songwriter: Sophie Allison
- Producer: Elliott Kozel

"Rings of Saturn" is a 2026 single by American singer-songwriter Sophie Allison, known professionally as Soccer Mommy.

== Background and release ==
Released on September 17, 2026, "Rings of Saturn" was Allison's first new song in two years, and was marketed as signifying the start of new era in her career. It was produced by Elliott Kozel, who has previously worked with Spanish singer-songwriter Rosalía and Icelandic singer Björk. Suji Park created the accompanying visual for the song.

== Composition and lyrics ==
Paste stated that the song "sees a return to Allison’s emotional, acoustic-driven indie rock." Stereogum said the song's chorus contains "fuzzed-out chords". Lyrically, "Rings of Saturn" explores the themes of insignificance, hope and feelings of being lost. Allison said in a statement: "This song is about feeling lost and looking for hope from anywhere. I wrote it during a difficult time when I would often take my telescope out into the yard to look at the moon or at planets. There’s something about feeling small that can kind of take the weight off." Pitchfork described the track as "somber".
