= Bloodstream (Soccer Mommy song) =

Single by Soccer Mommy

from the album Color Theory
- Released: 2020
- Genre: Indie rock
- Length: 5:37
- Label: Loma Vista
- Songwriter: Sophie Allison

"Bloodstream" is a song by American indie rock singer-songwriter Soccer Mommy, released as the third single from her 2020 album Color Theory on February 24, 2020. It is the album's opening track.

== Background ==
The song was performed at a Bernie Sanders rally prior to its release as a single.

== Composition and lyrics ==
The song explores themes of loss of innocence, young adulthood, depression and self-harm. Songwriter Sophie Allison told Pitchfork the song was particularly difficult for her to write:

There was so much imagery that I wanted to include from different parts of my life. I wanted there to be a huge contrast from being young and happy, and then completely losing that, and struggling with that loss. There’s parts in the song about struggling with depression and self-harm, which is so different from the way I had been when I was a kid. It’s like seeing this weird reflection of myself and not understanding what went wrong.

Paste said the song musically "lean[ed] into [Allison's] staple catchy guitar riffs and emotionally raw lyrics while also dabbling with distortion and a more sophisticated use of sonic layering."

== Music video ==
The song was released with an animated music video directed by Bella Clark. Paste said the video "featur[ed] a 3D animated avatar of Allison roaming about her house."

== Reception ==
Paste said the track was "simultaneously refreshing and classic for Soccer Mommy." NME called the song "heart wrenching".
