= Color Theory (album) =

Studio album by Soccer Mommy
- Released: February 28, 2020
- Studio: Alex the Great Recording (Nashville, Tennessee)
- Genres: Indie rock; dream pop; jangle pop; indie pop
- Length: 44:08
- Label: Loma Vista
- Producer: Gabe Wax

Soccer Mommy chronology
Clean (2018)	Color Theory (2020)	Soccer Mommy & Friends Singles Series (2020)

Singles from Color Theory
- 1. "Lucy" Released: September 19, 2019; 2. "Yellow Is the Color of Her Eyes" Released: November 19, 2019; 3. "Circle the Drain" Released: January 14, 2020; 4. "Bloodstream" Released: February 25, 2020; 5. "Crawling in My Skin" Released: October 30, 2020

Color Theory (stylized in all lowercase) is the second studio album by American indie rock singer-songwriter Sophie Allison, known under the moniker Soccer Mommy. Produced by Gabe Wax, it was released on February 28, 2020, through Loma Vista Recordings.

The album has received critical acclaim and was ranked among the year's best albums by multiple publications. At the 64th Annual Grammy Awards, the album received a nomination for the Grammy Award for Best Boxed or Special Limited Edition Package, losing out to the 50th Anniversary Edition of George Harrison's All Things Must Pass.

== Music and lyrics ==
Described by AllMusic as "grunge-lite," and by NME as "an account of personal pain set to warm lo-fi pop," Sophie Allison herself has described the sound on Color Theory as "the music of my childhood distressed." The album is described as simultaneously "bigger and brighter" and "grimmer". According to Pitchfork, "The songs on Color Theory sometimes feels like a series of 8-point-font text messages projected onto highway billboards."

The album is divided into three parts, each named after a color. Allison has said the albums distinct sections "represent the problems that I’ve developed as I’ve grown up, and how they’ve changed me". The album's lyrics explore themes such as homesickness, disease, fear of loss and despair. Other themes include body dysmorphic disorder, anxiety and depression, according to ABC Australia.

Allison said: "I want the record to feel like a relic from the past that’s been damaged and degraded with age. Because it kind of represents the problems that I’ve developed as I’ve grown up, and how they’ve changed me."

Allison said the ninth song "Stain" is about "feeling like you’ve had something taken from you that you didn’t give, and then being angry at the fact that someone was able to manipulate you into feeling guilty. Just replaying that interaction in your mind and being like, 'Why didn’t I control the situation better?'"

Allison's vocal performance on the album is characterized by her "plain uninflected voice". Her vocals have been described as "melodic, but not in the least showy." The rhythmic style on Color Theory is largely built around "chugging" power chords on the guitar played with downstrokes. Additionally, Allison used floppy disk samples, drum machines, and sound effects on the album, and employed unorthodox instruments such as the Mellotron and Wurlitzer.

== Critical reception ==
Professional ratings
Aggregate scores
Source	Rating
AnyDecentMusic?	7.9/10
Metacritic	81/100
Review scores
Source	Rating
AllMusic	4/5 stars
Exclaim!	9/10
The Guardian	4/5 stars
The Independent	4/5 stars
Mojo	4/5 stars
NME	4/5 stars
Pitchfork	7.8/10
Q	3/5 stars
Rolling Stone	4/5 stars
The Times	4/5 stars

Color Theory was met with critical acclaim from critics. At Metacritic, which assigns a normalized rating out of 100 to reviews from mainstream critics, the album received an average score of 81, which indicates "universal acclaim", based on 22 reviews.

Jayson Greene of Pitchfork wrote, "the second album from singer-songwriter Sophie Allison is piercing and unpredictable. In contrast to its bigger and brighter sound, the mood is grimmer, the emotional truths darker." Michael Hann of The Guardian wrote "Sophie Allison’s second album deals with ill-health and despair, but you would hardly know it from the fantastic arrangements and tunes." Hannah Mylrea of NME said the album is "as beautiful as it is brave".

AllMusic wrote, "Though the songs here aren't quite as immediately infectious as Clean, its combination of deceptively warm surfaces, alluring melodies, and subtly distorted textures reward repeat listens with that sense of discovery." NME gave the album four stars out of five, calling it "deeply moving."

Rob Sheffield of Rolling Stone named the album's third track "Royal Screw Up" as his twelfth-favorite song released in 2020.

=== Accolades ===
Accolades for Color Theory
Publication	Accolade	Rank	Ref.
Exclaim!	Exclaim!'s 50 Best Albums of 2020	41	
Gigwise	The Gigwise 51 Best Albums of 2020	16	
The Guardian	The 50 Best Albums of 2020	48	
Paste	Paste's 25 Best Albums of 2020 – Mid-Year	8	
Paste	The 50 Best Albums of 2020	7	
Pitchfork	The 50 Best Albums of 2020	26	
Rolling Stone	The 50 Best Albums of 2020	37	
Spin	Spin's 30 Best Albums of 2020 – Mid-Year	—N/a	
Stereogum	Stereogum's 50 Best Albums of 2020 – Mid-Year	6	
Stereogum	The 50 Best Albums of 2020	10	
Under the Radar	Under the Radar's Top 100 Albums of 2020	10	

== Track listing ==
All tracks are written by Sophie Allison.

Color Theory track listing
No.	Title	Length
1.	"Bloodstream"	5:37
2.	"Circle the Drain"	4:40
3.	"Royal Screw Up"	4:07
4.	"Night Swimming"	4:16
5.	"Crawling in My Skin"	4:17
6.	"Yellow Is the Color of Her Eyes"	7:15
7.	"Up the Walls"	2:44
8.	"Lucy"	4:56
9.	"Stain"	3:00
10.	"Gray Light"	3:16
Total length:		44:08

== Personnel ==
Credits are adapted from the album's liner notes.

Musicians

- Sophie Allison – vocals, songwriting (all tracks); acoustic guitar (1–4, 7, 8), electric guitar (1–6, 8–10), EPS 16 (3, 4), Prophet (5, 6, 10), Mellotron, Wurlitzer (6); keyboard (8), Juno (9)
- Rodrigo Avendaño – piano, SH-101, Prophet (1); SP-404 (2), electric guitar (5, 8), organ (7), keyboard (8)
- Julian Powell – electric guitar (1–8, 10), Wurlitzer (1), twelve-string guitar (2), piano (3, 4), acoustic guitar (5)
- Gabe Wax – SH-101 (1, 2), Prophet (1, 5, 6), EPS 16 (1, 5), Juno (2, 3), SP-404, percussion (2); electric guitar (3, 6), conga, ambience (3); background vocals (3, 6, 10), bass (4, 7), OP-1 (5), Wurlitzer (7, 10), shaker (7), keyboard (8), organ, drum programming (10)
- Graene Goetz – bass (1–3, 5, 6, 8, 10), MicroKORG (2)
- Ryan Elwell – drums (1–3, 5–8)
- Brett Resnick – pedal steel guitar (6, 10)
- Mary Lattimore – harp (6)
- Jackson Foraker – twelve-string guitar (7)

Production and artwork

- Gabe Wax – production, recording
- Boone Wallace – recording assistant
- Lars Stalfors – mixing
- Joe LaPorta – mastering
- Joe Nino-Hernes – vinyl cutting
- Brian Ziff – photography
- Lordess Foudre – package design

== Charts ==
Sales chart performance for Color Theory
Chart (2020)	Peak position
Scottish Albums (Official Charts)	52
US Billboard 200	142
US Top Alternative Albums (Billboard)	7
US Top Rock Albums (Billboard)	22

== See also ==
- List of 2020 albums
