= List of PlayStation 5 games =

This is a list of games for the PlayStation 5. Physical games are sold on Ultra HD Blu-ray and digital games can be purchased through the PlayStation Store. The PlayStation 5 is backwards compatible with all but six PlayStation 4 games. This list only includes games that are released natively for PlayStation 5. PlayStation VR2 and backwards compatible games are excluded.

There are currently 1128 games on this list. (Note: This number is always up to date by this script.)

Key	CB Supports cross-buy	CP Supports cross-play	P Pro enhanced

Title	Genre(s)	Developer(s)	Publisher(s)	Release date			Addons	Ref.
Title	Genre(s)	Developer(s)	Publisher(s)	JP	NA	PAL	Addons	Ref.
#Xmas, Super Puzzles Dream	Puzzle	e-llusiontertainment	e-llusiontertainment	Unreleased	Dec 23, 2022	Dec 23, 2022		
007 First Light	Action-adventure	IO Interactive	IO Interactive	May 27, 2026	May 27, 2026	May 27, 2026		
0 Degrees	Action; puzzle	Kiddo Dev; EastAsiaSoft; Nerd Games	EastAsiaSoft	Jun 13, 2022	Dec 30, 2021	Dec 30, 2021		
1000xResist	Adventure	Sunset Visitor	Fellow Traveller Games	Nov 4, 2025	Nov 4, 2025	Nov 4, 2025		
171	Action-adventure	Betagames Group	QUByte Interactive	TBA	TBA	TBA		
1917: The Alien Invasion DX Remastered	Shoot 'em up	Andrade Games	Red Art Games	Unreleased	Unreleased	Feb 28, 2025		
2XKO	Fighting	Riot Games	Riot Games	Jan 20, 2026	Jan 20, 2026	Jan 20, 2026		
20 Bunnies	Action; puzzle	EastAsiaSoft; Nerd Games	EastAsiaSoft	May 2, 2022	Nov 19, 2021	Nov 18, 2021		
3 °C Sand Puzzle	Puzzle	COOL&WARM	Kemco	Feb 20, 2025	Feb 20, 2025	Feb 20, 2025		
30 Sport Games in 1	Sports	Just for Games SAS	Maximum Entertainment France	May 11, 2023	May 11, 2023	May 11, 2023		
3D Pool: Billiards & Snooker Remastered	Sports	Joindots	Joindots	Unreleased	Feb 19, 2021	Feb 19, 2021		
7 Days to Die	Survival horror	The Fun Pimps	The Fun Pimps	Feb 13, 2025	Jul 25, 2024	Jul 25, 2024		
Abandoned	Survival horror	Blue Box Game Studios	Blue Box Game Studios	TBA	TBA	TBA		
Abathor	Platformer; Hack and slash; Action	Pow Pixel Games	Jandusoft	Unreleased	Jul 25, 2024	Jul 25, 2024		
Abiotic Factor	Survival	Deep Field Games	Playstack	Unreleased	Jul 22, 2025	Jul 22, 2025		
Achilles: Legends Untold	Action role-playing	Dark Point Games	Dark Point Games	Nov 2, 2023	Nov 2, 2023	Nov 2, 2023		
Accolade Sports Collection	Sports	QUByte Interactive	QUByte Interactive; Atari	Jan 30, 2025	Jan 30, 2025	Jan 30, 2025		
Aero the Acro-Bat	Platform	Sunsoft	Ratalaika Games	Aug 2, 2024	Aug 2, 2024	Aug 2, 2024		
Aero the Acro-Bat 2	Platform	Sunsoft	Ratalaika Games	Sep 6, 2024	Sep 6, 2024	Sep 6, 2024		
Aero The Acro-Bat: Rascal Rival Revenge	Platform	Sunsoft	Ratalaika Games	Nov 1, 2024	Nov 1, 2024	Nov 1, 2024		
Aeterna Noctis	Metroidvania	Aeternum Game Studios	Aeternum Game Studios	Dec 15, 2021	Dec 15, 2021	Dec 15, 2021		
AEW Fight Forever	Sports	Yuke's	THQ Nordic; AEW Games	Jun 29, 2023	Jun 29, 2023	Jun 29, 2023		
AFL 23	Sports	Big Ant Studios	Nacon	May 4, 2023	May 4, 2023	May 4, 2023		
AFL 26	Sports	Big Ant Studios	Nacon	May 8, 2025	May 8, 2025	May 8, 2025		
Afterlove EP	Adventure; Rhythm	Pikselnesia	Fellow Traveller Games	Feb 14, 2025	Feb 14, 2025	Feb 14, 2025		
Age of Empires II: Definitive Edition	Real-time strategy	World's Edge; Forgotten Empires	Xbox Game Studios	May 6, 2025	May 6, 2025	May 6, 2025		
Age of Empires IV: Anniversary Edition	Real-time strategy	Relic Entertainment; World's Edge	Xbox Game Studios	Nov 4, 2025	Nov 4, 2025	Nov 4, 2025		
Age of Mythology: Retold	Real-time strategy	World's Edge; Forgotten Empires	Xbox Game Studios	Mar 4, 2025	Mar 4, 2025	Mar 4, 2025		
Age of Wonders 4	Turn-based strategy	Triumph Studios	Paradox Interactive	May 3, 2023	May 2, 2023	May 2, 2023		
Air Twister	Rail shooter	YS Net	ININ Games	Nov 10, 2023	Nov 10, 2023	Nov 10, 2023		
Alan Wake Remastered	Survival horror	Remedy Entertainment	Microsoft Game Studios	Oct 4, 2021	Oct 4, 2021	Oct 4, 2021		
Alan Wake 2	Survival horror	Remedy Entertainment	Epic Games	Oct 27, 2023	Oct 27, 2023	Oct 27, 2023	P	
Alex Kidd in Miracle World DX	Platform	Jankenteam	Merge Games	Jun 22, 2021	Jun 22, 2021	Jun 22, 2021		
Alfred Hitchcock – Vertigo	Adventure	Pendulo Studios	Microids	Unreleased	Oct 4, 2022	Sep 27, 2022		
Aliens	First-person shooter	Sabec Limited	Sabec Limited	Unreleased	Mar 31, 2021	Mar 31, 2021		
Aliens: Fireteam Elite	Action-adventure; third-person shooter	Cold Iron Studios	Cold Iron Studios	Aug 24, 2021	Aug 24, 2021	Aug 24, 2021		
Aliens: Dark Descent	Turn-based strategy	Tindalos Interactive	Focus Entertainment	Jun 20, 2023	Jun 20, 2023	Jun 20, 2023		
Alien Hominid HD	Run and gun	The Behemoth	The Behemoth	Jun 10, 2025	Jun 10, 2025	Jun 10, 2025		
Alien Hominid Invasion	Run and gun	The Behemoth	The Behemoth	Jun 10, 2025	Jun 10, 2025	Jun 10, 2025		
Alice Gear Aegis CS: Concerto of Simulatrix	Action	Pyramid	Mages; PQube	Sep 8, 2022	Mar 14, 2023	Mar 15, 2023		
The Alters	Survival	11 Bit Studios	11 Bit Studios	Jun 13, 2025	Jun 13, 2025	Jun 13, 2025		
Ambulance Life: A Paramedic Simulator	Simulation	Aesir Interactive	Nacon	TBA	TBA	TBA		
Among Us	Party; social deduction	Innersloth	Innersloth	Dec 14, 2021	Dec 14, 2021	Dec 14, 2021		
Animal Well	Platform	Billy Basso	Billy Basso	May 9, 2024	May 9, 2024	May 9, 2024		
Anno 1800 Console Edition	Real-time strategy	Blue Byte	Ubisoft	Mar 16, 2023	Mar 16, 2023	Mar 16, 2023		
Anno: Mutationem	Action role-playing	ThinkingStars	ThinkingStars	Mar 16, 2022	Mar 16, 2022	Mar 16, 2022		
Anodyne 2: Return to Dust	Action-adventure	Analgesic Productions	Ratalaika Games	Feb 18, 2021	Feb 18, 2021	Feb 18, 2021		
Another Crab's Treasure	Soulslike	Aggro Crab	Aggro Crab	Apr 25, 2024	Apr 25, 2024	Apr 25, 2024		
Apex Legends	Battle royale; hero shooter	Respawn Entertainment	Electronic Arts	Mar 29, 2022	Mar 29, 2022	Mar 29, 2022	CP P	
Apico	Beekeeping; Simulation	TNgineers	Whitethorn Games	Dec 4, 2023	Sep 29, 2022	Sep 29, 2022		
A Plague Tale: Innocence	Action-adventure; stealth; survival horror	Asobo Studio	Focus Home Interactive	Jul 6, 2021	Jul 6, 2021	Jul 6, 2021		
A Plague Tale: Requiem	Action-adventure; stealth; survival horror	Asobo Studio	Focus Home Interactive	Oct 17, 2022	Oct 17, 2022	Oct 17, 2022		
Apsulov: End of Gods	Horror	Angry Demon Studios	Digerati Distribution	Mar 23, 2023	Aug 27, 2021	Aug 27, 2021		
Aragami 2	Action-adventure; stealth	Lince Works	Lince Works	Sep 17, 2021	Sep 17, 2021	Sep 17, 2021		
Arcade Archives 2: Ridge Racer	Racing	Namco	Hamster Corporation	Jun 5, 2025	Jun 5, 2025	Jun 5, 2025		
Arcadegeddon	Shooter	IllFonic	IllFonic	Jul 8, 2021	Jul 8, 2021	Jul 8, 2021		
Armored Core VI: Fires of Rubicon	Mech	FromSoftware	Bandai Namco Entertainment	Aug 25, 2023	Aug 25, 2023	Aug 25, 2023		
Arcade Paradise	Adventure; simulation	Nosebleed Interactive	Wired Productions	Aug 11, 2022	Aug 11, 2022	Aug 11, 2022		
Archetype Arcadia	Visual novel	Water Phoenix	Kemco	Oct 21, 2021	Unreleased	Unreleased		
Architect Life: A House Design Simulator	Simulation	Shine Research	Nacon	Jun 19, 2025	Jun 19, 2025	Jun 19, 2025		
ARC Raiders	Third-person shooter	Embark Studios	Embark Studios	Oct 30, 2025	Oct 30, 2025	Oct 30, 2025	P	
Arctic Awakening	Adventure	GoldFire Studios	GoldFire Studios	Sep 15, 2025	Sep 15, 2025	Sep 15, 2025		
Arknights: Endfield	Action-adventure	Hypergryph	Gryphline	Jan 22, 2026	Jan 22, 2026	Jan 22, 2026		
Arrog	Adventure	Hermanos Magia; Leap Game Studios	nakana.io	Unreleased	Feb 5, 2021	Feb 5, 2021		
Art of Rally	Racing	Funselektor Labs	Funselektor Labs	Oct 6, 2021	Oct 6, 2021	Oct 6, 2021		
The Artful Escape	Platform	Beethoven & Dinosaur	Annapurna Interactive	Jan 25, 2022	Jan 25, 2022	Jan 25, 2022		
As Dusk Falls	Adventure; interactive fiction	Interior Night	Interior Night	Mar 7, 2024	Mar 7, 2024	Mar 7, 2024		
The Ascent	Action role-playing	Neon Giant	Curve Digital	Mar 24, 2022	Mar 24, 2022	Mar 24, 2022		
A Space for the Unbound	Adventure	Mojiken Studio	Chorus Worldwide	Jan 19, 2023	Jan 19, 2023	Jan 19, 2023		
Asphalt Legends	Racing	Gameloft Barcelona	Gameloft	Jul 17, 2024	Jul 17, 2024	Jul 17, 2024	CP	
Assassin's Creed Mirage	Action role-playing	Ubisoft Bordeaux	Ubisoft	Oct 5, 2023	Oct 5, 2023	Oct 5, 2023	CB P	
Assassin's Creed Shadows	Action role-playing	Ubisoft Québec	Ubisoft	Mar 20, 2025	Mar 20, 2025	Mar 20, 2025	P	
Assassin's Creed Valhalla	Action role-playing	Ubisoft Montréal	Ubisoft	Nov 12, 2020	Nov 12, 2020	Nov 19, 2020	CB	
Assetto Corsa Competizione	Racing	Kunos Simulazioni	505 Games	Feb 24, 2022	Feb 24, 2022	Feb 24, 2022		
Asterigos: Curse of the Stars	Action role-playing	Acme Gamestudio	Acme Gamestudio	Oct 11, 2022	Oct 11, 2022	Oct 11, 2022		
Asterix & Obelix: Slap Them All! 2	Fighting	Mr. Nutz Studio	Microids	Jun 3, 2024	Nov 14, 2023	Nov 14, 2023		
Astria Ascending	Role-playing	Artisan Studios	Dear Villagers	Sep 30, 2021	Sep 30, 2021	Sep 30, 2021		
Astro Bot	Platform	Team Asobi	Sony Interactive Entertainment	Sep 6, 2024	Sep 6, 2024	Sep 6, 2024		
Astrolander	Action	Lost Cartridge Creations	Lost Cartridge Creations	2026	2026	2026		
Astro's Playroom	3D platformer	Japan Studio	Sony Interactive Entertainment	Nov 12, 2020	Nov 12, 2020	Nov 19, 2020		
Atari 50: The Anniversary Celebration	Various	Digital Eclipse	Atari	Nov 11, 2022	Nov 11, 2022	Nov 11, 2022		
Atelier Marie: The Alchemist of Salburg	Role-playing	Gust Co. Ltd.	Koei Tecmo	Jul 13, 2023	Jul 13, 2023	Jul 13, 2023		
Atelier Ryza 2: Lost Legends & the Secret Fairy	Role-playing	Gust Co. Ltd.	Koei Tecmo	Dec 3, 2020	Jan 26, 2021	Jan 29, 2021	CB	
Atelier Ryza 3: Alchemist of the End & the Secret Key	Role-playing	Gust Co. Ltd.	Koei Tecmo	Mar 23, 2023	Mar 23, 2023	Mar 23, 2023		
Atelier Yumia: The Alchemist of Memories & the Envisioned Land	Role-playing	Gust Co. Ltd.	Koei Tecmo	Mar 31, 2025	Mar 31, 2025	Mar 31, 2025		
Atlas Fallen	Action role-playing	Deck13 Interactive	Focus Entertainment	Aug 10, 2023	Aug 10, 2023	Aug 10, 2023		
Atomfall	Action; survival	Rebellion Developments	Rebellion Developments	Mar 27, 2025	Mar 27, 2025	Mar 27, 2025		
Atomic Heart	First-person shooter	Mundfish	Mundfish	Feb 21, 2023	Feb 21, 2023	Feb 21, 2023		
Atomic Heart 2	First-person shooter	Mundfish	Mundfish	TBA	TBA	TBA		
Auto Chess	Auto battler	Dragonest Game	Dragonest Game	Mar 30, 2021	Mar 30, 2021	Mar 30, 2021		
Avatar: Frontiers of Pandora	Action-adventure	Massive Entertainment	Ubisoft	Dec 7, 2023	Dec 7, 2023	Dec 7, 2023		
Avatar: The Last Airbender: Quest for Balance	Action-adventure	Bamtang Games	GameMill Entertainment	Unreleased	Sep 22, 2023	Sep 22, 2023		
Marvel's Avengers	Action-adventure	Crystal Dynamics	Square Enix	Mar 18, 2021	Mar 18, 2021	Mar 18, 2021	CB CP	
Avowed	Action role-playing	Obsidian Entertainment	Xbox Game Studios	Feb 17, 2026	Feb 17, 2026	Feb 17, 2026		
Away: The Survival Series	Action-adventure; survival	Breaking Walls	Breaking Walls	Sep 28, 2021	Sep 28, 2021	Sep 28, 2021		
Axiom Verge 2	Metroidvania	Thomas Happ Games	Thomas Happ Games	Aug 9, 2022	Aug 9, 2022	Aug 9, 2022		
Aztech: Forgotten Gods	Action-adventure	Lienzo	Lienzo	Mar 10, 2022	Mar 10, 2022	Mar 10, 2022		
Babylon's Fall	Action	PlatinumGames	Square Enix	Mar 3, 2022	Mar 3, 2022	Mar 3, 2022		
Back 4 Blood	First-person shooter; survival horror	Turtle Rock Studios	WB Games	Oct 12, 2021	Oct 12, 2021	Oct 12, 2021	CB	
Backfirewall	Adventure; Puzzle	Naraven Games	All in! Games	Jan 30, 2023	Jan 30, 2023	Jan 30, 2023		
Bad Birds	Arcade; Casual	Oiven Games	Oiven Games	Unreleased	Jun 4, 2024	Jun 4, 2024		
Balan Wonderworld	3D platformer	Balan Company; Arzest	Square Enix	Mar 26, 2021	Mar 26, 2021	Mar 26, 2021	CB	
Balatro	Roguelike deck-building	LocalThunk	Playstack	Feb 20, 2024	Feb 20, 2024	Feb 20, 2024		
Baldur's Gate III	Role-playing	Larian Studios	Larian Studios	Sep 6, 2023	Sep 6, 2023	Sep 6, 2023	P	
Ball x Pit	Survival	Kenny Sun	Devolver Digital	Oct 15, 2025	Oct 15, 2025	Oct 15, 2025		
Battlefield 6	First-person shooter	Battlefield Studios	Electronic Arts	Oct 10, 2025	Oct 10, 2025	Oct 10, 2025	P	
Battlefield 2042	First-person shooter	DICE	Electronic Arts	Nov 19, 2021	Nov 19, 2021	Nov 19, 2021	CP	
Batora: Lost Haven	Action role-playing	Stormind Games	Team17	Oct 20, 2022	Oct 20, 2022	Oct 20, 2022		
Before We Leave	City-building	Balancing Monkey Games	Team 17	Apr 5, 2022	Apr 5, 2022	Apr 5, 2022		
Berserk Boy	Side-scrolling; Action platformer	BerserkBoy Games	BerserkBoy Games	Unreleased	Feb 18, 2025	Feb 18, 2025		
Beyond Contact	Survival	Playcorp Studios	Deep Silver	TBA	TBA	TBA		
Beyond a Steel Sky	Adventure	Revolution Software	Revolution Software; Microids	Nov 30, 2021	Nov 30, 2021	Nov 30, 2021		
The Binding of Isaac: Repentance	Roguelike	Nicalis	Nicalis	Unreleased	Nov 4, 2021	Nov 4, 2021		
Blasphemous 2	Action; Metroidvania	The Game Kitchen	Team17	Aug 24, 2023	Aug 24, 2023	Aug 24, 2023		
Bluey: The Videogame	Action-adventure	Artax Games	Outright Games	Nov 17, 2023	Nov 17, 2023	Nov 17, 2023		
Blue Reflection	Role-playing	Gust Co. Ltd.	Koei Tecmo	Jul 30, 2026	Jul 30, 2026	Jul 30, 2026		
Blue Reflection Ray	Visual Novel	Gust Co. Ltd.	Koei Tecmo	Jul 30, 2026	Jul 30, 2026	Jul 30, 2026		
Blue Reflection: Second Light	Role-playing	Gust Co. Ltd.	Koei Tecmo	Jul 30, 2026	Jul 30, 2026	Jul 30, 2026		
Blue Reflection: Sun	Role-playing	Gust Co. Ltd.	Koei Tecmo	Jul 30, 2026	Jul 30, 2026	Jul 30, 2026		
Biomutant	Action role-playing	Experiment 101	THQ Nordic	Sep 6, 2022	Sep 6, 2022	Sep 6, 2022		
Bang-On Balls: Chronicles	Adventure; Casual; Action	Exit Plan Games	Untold Tales	Mar 4, 2024	Mar 4, 2024	Mar 4, 2024		
Black Legend	Turn-based strategy	Warcave	Warcave	Mar 25, 2021	Mar 25, 2021	Mar 25, 2021		
Black Myth: Wukong	Action role-playing	Game Science	Game Science	Aug 20, 2024	Aug 20, 2024	Aug 20, 2024		
Blast Brigade vs. the Evil Legion of Dr. Cread	Action-adventure; platform	Allods Team Arcade	My.Games	Apr 13, 2022	Apr 13, 2022	Apr 13, 2022		
Blazing Strike	Fighting	RareBreed Makes Games	Aksys Games	TBA	TBA	TBA		
Blood Bowl 3	Sports; turn-based strategy	Cyanide	Nacon	Feb 23, 2023	Feb 23, 2023	Feb 23, 2023		
BloodRayne Betrayal: Fresh Bites	Hack and slash; platform	WayForward	Ziggurat Interactive	Sep 9, 2021	Sep 9, 2021	Sep 9, 2021		
Borderlands 3	Action role-playing; first-person shooter	Gearbox Software	2K	Nov 12, 2020	Nov 12, 2020	Nov 19, 2020	CB CP	
Borderlands 4	Action role-playing; first-person shooter	Gearbox Software	2K	Sep 12, 2025	Sep 12, 2025	Sep 12, 2025		
Boyfriend Dungeon	Dungeon crawl; Dating Sim	Kitfox Games	Kitfox Games	Feb 14, 2023	Feb 14, 2023	Feb 14, 2023		
Braid Anniversary Edition	Puzzle-platformer	Thekla	Thekla	May 14, 2024	May 14, 2024	May 14, 2024		
Bratz: Flaunt Your Fashion	Action; adventure	Petoons Studio	Outright Games	Nov 4, 2022	Nov 4, 2022	Nov 4, 2022		
Breakout: Recharged	Puzzle	Adamvision Studios; SneakyBox	Atari	Feb 10, 2022	Feb 10, 2022	Feb 10, 2022		
Breathedge	Survival	Redruins Softworks	HypeTrain Digital	Feb 25, 2022	Feb 25, 2022	Feb 25, 2022		
Bridge Constructor: The Walking Dead	Puzzle	ClockStone	Headup Games	Dec 15, 2020	Dec 15, 2020	Dec 15, 2020	CB	
Bubsy in: The Purrfect Collection	Platform	Limited Run Games	Atari	Sep 9, 2025	Sep 9, 2025	Sep 9, 2025		
Bugsnax	Adventure; platform	Young Horses	Young Horses	Nov 12, 2020	Nov 12, 2020	Nov 19, 2020	CB	
Bus Bound	Vehicle simulation	Stillalive Studios	Saber Interactive	TBA	TBA	TBA		
Bus Simulator 21	Vehicle simulation	Stillalive Studios	Astragon	May 16, 2023	May 16, 2023	May 16, 2023		
Bus Simulator 27	Vehicle simulation	Simteract	Astragon Entertainment	TBA	TBA	TBA		
C14 Dating	Dating Simulation	Ratalaika Games	Ratalaika Games	Mar 30, 2021	Mar 30, 2021	Mar 30, 2021	CP	
Cairn	Simulation; Adventure	The Game Bakers	The Game Bakers	Jan 29, 2026	Jan 29, 2026	Jan 29, 2026		
Call of Duty: Black Ops	First-person shooter	Iron Galaxy; Treyarch	Activision	Jul 9, 2026	Jul 9, 2026	Jul 9, 2026		
Call of Duty: Black Ops II	First-person shooter	Iron Galaxy; Treyarch	Activision	Jul 9, 2026	Jul 9, 2026	Jul 9, 2026		
Call of Duty: Black Ops 6	First-person shooter	Raven Software; Treyarch	Activision	Oct 25, 2024	Oct 25, 2024	Oct 25, 2024	P	
Call of Duty: Black Ops 7	First-person shooter	Raven Software; Treyarch	Activision	Nov 14, 2025	Nov 14, 2025	Nov 14, 2025		
Call of Duty: Black Ops Cold War	First-person shooter	Raven Software; Treyarch	Activision	Nov 13, 2020	Nov 13, 2020	Nov 19, 2020	CP	
Call of Duty: Modern Warfare II	First-person shooter	Infinity Ward	Activision	Oct 28, 2022	Oct 28, 2022	Oct 28, 2022		
Call of Duty: Modern Warfare III	First-person shooter	Sledgehammer Games	Activision	Nov 10, 2023	Nov 10, 2023	Nov 10, 2023		
Call of Duty: Modern Warfare 4	First-person shooter	Infinity Ward	Activision	Oct 23, 2026	Oct 23, 2026	Oct 23, 2026		
Call of Duty: Vanguard	First-person shooter	Sledgehammer Games	Activision	Nov 5, 2021	Nov 5, 2021	Nov 5, 2021		
Call of Duty: Warzone 2.0	Battle royale; first-person shooter	Raven Software; Infinity Ward	Activision	Nov 16, 2022	Nov 16, 2022	Nov 16, 2022		
Call of the Sea	Adventure; puzzle	Out of the Blue	Raw Fury	May 11, 2021	May 11, 2021	May 11, 2021		
The Callisto Protocol	Survival horror	Striking Distance Studios	Krafton	Unreleased	Dec 2, 2022	Dec 2, 2022	P	
Campfire of Oasis	Casual	Nextgo24 UG	Nextgo24 UG	Aug 8, 2024	Aug 8, 2024	Aug 8, 2024		
Can't Drive This	Racing	Pixel Maniacs	Perp Games	Mar 19, 2021	Mar 19, 2021	Mar 19, 2021		
Carpieces	Arcade	Xitilon	Xitilon	Jan 10, 2026	Jan 10, 2026	Jan 10, 2026		
The Casting of Frank Stone	Survival horror; Interactive drama	Supermassive Games	Behaviour Interactive	Sep 3, 2024	Sep 3, 2024	Sep 3, 2024		
Cazzarion: Astro Bouncer	Casual	Armin Unold	Armin Unold	Mar 10, 2024	Mar 10, 2024	Mar 10, 2024		
Cazzarion: Builder	Casual	Armin Unold	Armin Unold	Mar 11, 2025	Mar 11, 2025	Mar 11, 2025		
Cazzarion: Coin Pilot	Casual	Armin Unold	Armin Unold	Jun 8, 2024	Jun 8, 2024	Jun 8, 2024		
Cazzarion: Cute Town	Casual	Armin Unold	Armin Unold	Mar 17, 2025	Mar 17, 2025	Mar 17, 2025		
Cazzarion: Flak Battle	Casual	Armin Unold	Armin Unold	Jun 16, 2024	Jun 16, 2024	Jun 16, 2024		
Cazzarion: Forest Defense	Casual	Armin Unold	Armin Unold	Apr 28, 2024	Apr 28, 2024	Apr 28, 2024		
Cazzarion: Ghost Frenzy	Casual	Armin Unold	Armin Unold	Mar 20, 2024	Mar 20, 2024	Mar 20, 2024		
Cazzarion: Pop the Bubbles	Casual	Armin Unold	Armin Unold	Apr 14, 2024	Apr 14, 2024	Apr 14, 2024		
Cazzarion: Robot Rush	Casual	Armin Unold	Armin Unold	May 12, 2024	May 12, 2024	May 12, 2024		
Cazzarion: Rocket Raid	Casual	Armin Unold	Armin Unold	May 27, 2024	May 27, 2024	May 27, 2024		
Cazzarion: Shellfish Frenzy	Casual	Armin Unold	Armin Unold	Mar 19, 2024	Mar 19, 2024	Mar 19, 2024		
Cazzarion: Sky Flight	Casual	Armin Unold	Armin Unold	May 12, 2024	May 12, 2024	May 12, 2024		
Cazzarion: Space Ace	Casual	Armin Unold	Armin Unold	Mar 26, 2024	Mar 26, 2024	Mar 26, 2024		
Cazzarion: Space Shooter	Casual	Armin Unold	Armin Unold	Dec 21, 2023	Dec 21, 2023	Dec 21, 2023		
Cazzarion: Speed Run	Casual	Armin Unold	Armin Unold	Apr 21, 2024	Apr 21, 2024	Apr 21, 2024		
Cazzarion: Star Collector	Casual	Armin Unold	Armin Unold	May 29, 2024	May 29, 2024	May 29, 2024		
Cazzarion: Tank Killer	Casual	Armin Unold	Armin Unold	Jun 9, 2024	Jun 9, 2024	Jun 9, 2024		
Cazzarion: Whack a Zombie	Casual	Armin Unold	Armin Unold	May 5, 2024	May 5, 2024	May 5, 2024		
The Centennial Case: A Shijima Story	Adventure	h.a.n.d.	Square Enix	May 12, 2022	May 12, 2022	May 12, 2022		
Centipede: Recharged	Puzzle	Adamvision Studios; SneakyBox	Atari	Sep 29, 2021	Sep 29, 2021	Sep 29, 2021		
Centum	Point-and-click adventure; Psychological horror; Visual novel	Hack The Publisher	Serenity Forge	Unreleased	Mar 11, 2025	Mar 11, 2025		
Century: Age of Ashes	Action	Playwing	Playwing	Feb 21, 2023	Sep 26, 2022	Sep 26, 2022		
Chernobylite	Survival	The Farm 51	All In! Games	Apr 21, 2022	Apr 21, 2022	Apr 21, 2022		
Chicory: A Colorful Tale	Adventure; puzzle	Greg Lobanov	Finji	Jun 10, 2021	Jun 10, 2021	Jun 10, 2021		
Chivalry 2	Hack and slash	Torn Banner Studios	Deep Silver; Tripwire Interactive	Jun 8, 2021	Jun 8, 2021	Jun 8, 2021	CP	
Choo-Choo Charles	Adventure	Two Star Games	Two Star Games	Jan 2, 2024	Dec 21, 2023	Dec 21, 2023		
Chorus	Space combat	Fishlabs	Deep Silver	Unreleased	Dec 3, 2021	Dec 3, 2021		
Chronos Time	Casual	Nextgo24 UG	Nextgo24 UG	Oct 20, 2024	Oct 20, 2024	Oct 20, 2024		
Civilization VII	4X; turn-based strategy	Firaxis Games	2K	Feb 11, 2025	Feb 11, 2025	Feb 11, 2025		
Clair Obscur: Expedition 33	Role-playing	Sandfall Interactive	Kepler Interactive	Apr 24, 2025	Apr 24, 2025	Apr 24, 2025	P	
Clash: Artifacts of Chaos	Action-adventure	ACE Team	Nacon	Mar 9, 2023	Mar 9, 2023	Mar 9, 2023		
Clid the Snail	Shoot 'em up	Weird Beluga Studio	Koch Media	Unreleased	Dec 15, 2021	Dec 15, 2021		
Cliff Rush 3D	Casual	Nextgo24 UG	Nextgo24 UG	Nov 18, 2024	Nov 18, 2024	Nov 18, 2024		
Climate Station	Educational	Sony Interactive Entertainment	Sony Interactive Entertainment	Jun 18, 2025	Jun 18, 2025	Jun 18, 2025		
Cloudheim	Action RPG	Noodle Cat Games	Noodle Cat Games	TBA	TBA	TBA		
Cocoon	Puzzle; Indie; Action; Adventure	Geometric Interactive	Annapurna Interactive	Sep 29, 2023	Sep 29, 2023	Sep 29, 2023		
Code Violet	Action; horror	TeamKill Media	TeamKill Media	Jan 10, 2026	Jan 10, 2026	Jan 10, 2026		
Color Dodge	Action	Oiven Games	Oiven Games	Unreleased	Aug 6, 2024	Aug 6, 2024		
Color Snake	Casual	Nosta Games Ltd.	Nosta Games Ltd.	Jun 13, 2024	Jun 13, 2024	Jun 13, 2024		
Company of Heroes 3	Real-time strategy	Relic Entertainment	Sega	May 30, 2023	May 30, 2023	May 30, 2023		
Concept Destruction	Vehicular combat	Ratalaika Games	Ratalaika Games	Unreleased	Nov 12, 2020	Nov 23, 2020	CB	
Concord	First-person shooter	Firewalk	Sony Interactive Entertainment	Aug 23, 2024	Aug 23, 2024	Aug 23, 2024		
Control: Ultimate Edition	Third-person shooter; action-adventure	Remedy Entertainment	505 Games	Feb 2, 2021	Feb 2, 2021	Feb 2, 2021	CB	
Control Resonant	Third-person shooter; action-adventure	Remedy Entertainment	Remedy Entertainment	Sep 24, 2026	Sep 24, 2026	Sep 24, 2026		
Conway: Disappearance at Dahlia View	Adventure	White Paper Games	Sold Out	TBA	TBA	TBA		
Cookie Clicker	Incremental	DashNet	Playsaurus	May 22, 2025	May 22, 2025	May 22, 2025		
Cosmophobia	Action; horror	ASIMCORPORATION S.R.L.	ASIMCORPORATION S.R.L.	Feb 1, 2025	Feb 1, 2025	Feb 1, 2025		
Cozy Claw Machine	Casual	Two Llamas s.r.o.	Two Llamas s.r.o.	Oct 28, 2024	Oct 28, 2024	Oct 28, 2024		
Crash Bandicoot 4: It's About Time	Platform	Toys for Bob	Activision	Mar 12, 2021	Mar 12, 2021	Mar 12, 2021	CB	
Crash Drive 3	Racing	M2H	M2H	Jul 8, 2021	Jul 8, 2021	Jul 8, 2021		
Crazy Ball	Puzzle	Colosseum Studio	Colosseum Studio	Feb 21, 2025	Feb 21, 2025	Feb 21, 2025		
Crazy Chicken Jump 'n' Run Traps and Treasures	Action; Casual	Higgs Games	Markt+Technik	Unreleased	Aug 4, 2022	Aug 4, 2022		
Crazy Chicken Jump 'n' Run Traps and Treasures 2	Action	Korion Interactive	Markt+Technik	Unreleased	Dec 25, 2023	Dec 25, 2023		
Crazy Chicken Kart 2	Racing	Korion Interactive	Markt+Technik	Unreleased	May 31, 2022	May 31, 2022		
Crazy Chicken Remake	Arcade; Casual	Independent Arts Software	Markt+Technik	Unreleased	Jul 9, 2021	Jul 9, 2021		
Crazy Chicken Wanted	Casual	Independent Arts Software	Markt+Technik	Unreleased	Jul 7, 2021	Jul 9, 2021		
Crazy Chicken X	Casual	Korion Interactive	Markt+Technik	Unreleased	Dec 13, 2023	Dec 13, 2023		
Crazy Chicken Xtreme	Action	Korion Interactive	Markt+Technik	Unreleased	Jun 15, 2022	Jun 15, 2022		
The Crew Motorfest	Racing	Ubisoft Ivory Tower	Ubisoft	Sep 14, 2023	Sep 14, 2023	Sep 14, 2023	P	
Cricket 22	Sports	Big Ant Studios	Nacon	Unreleased	Nov 25, 2021	Nov 25, 2021		
Cricket 24	Sports	Murtaza Hakeemzada and CO	Big Ant Studios	Oct 5, 2023	Oct 5, 2023	Oct 5, 2023		
Crimson Desert	Action-adventure	Pearl Abyss	Pearl Abyss	Mar 19, 2026	Mar 19, 2026	Mar 19, 2026		
Crimsonland	Shoot 'em up	10tons	10tons	Unreleased	Jan 20, 2021	Jan 20, 2021	CB	
Cris Tales	Action role-playing	Dreams Uncorporated; SYCK	Modus Games	Jul 20, 2021	Jul 20, 2021	Jul 20, 2021		
Crisis Core: Final Fantasy VII Reunion	Role-playing	Square Enix	Square Enix	Dec 13, 2022	Dec 13, 2022	Dec 13, 2022		
CRSED: F.O.A.D.	First-person shooter	Darkflow Studio	Gaijin Entertainment	Dec 15, 2020	Dec 15, 2020	Dec 15, 2020		
Crusader Kings III	Grand strategy; role-playing	Paradox Development Studio; Lab42 Games	Paradox Interactive	Mar 29, 2022	Mar 29, 2022	Mar 29, 2022		
Crystar	Action role-playing	Gemdrops	FuRyu	Feb 27, 2025	Dec 4, 2024	Dec 4, 2024		
Cthulhu Saves Christmas	Role-playing	Zeboyd Games	Zeboyd Games	Dec 22, 2020	Dec 22, 2020	Dec 22, 2020		
Cult of the Lamb	Roguelike; Construction; Simulation	Massive Monster	Devolver Digital	Aug 22, 2022	Aug 22, 2022	Aug 22, 2022		
Curse of the Sea Rats	Metroidvania	Petoon Studios	PQube	Apr 6, 2023	Apr 6, 2023	Apr 6, 2023		
Cuisineer	Role-Playing	BattleBrew Productions	NA: Xseed Games; EU: Marvelous Europe	Jan 28, 2025	Jan 28, 2025	Jan 28, 2025		
Curved Space	Twin-stick shooter	Only By Midnight	Maximum Games	Unreleased	Jun 29, 2021	Jun 29, 2021		
Cyber Citizen Shockman	Platformer; Hack and slash	Shinyuden	Ratalaika Games	May 18, 2023	May 18, 2023	May 18, 2023		
Cyber Citizen Shockman 3: The Princess from Another World	Platformer; Hack and slash	Shinyuden	Ratalaika Games	May 3, 2024	May 3, 2024	May 3, 2024		
Cyberpunk 2077	Action role-playing	CD Projekt Red	CD Projekt	Feb 15, 2022	Feb 15, 2022	Feb 15, 2022	CB	
Cyber Shadow	Action; platform	Mechanical Head Studios	Yacht Club Games	Unreleased	Jan 26, 2021	Jan 26, 2021	CB	
CYGNI: All Guns Blazing	Shoot 'em up	KeelWorks	KeelWorks	Aug 6, 2024	Aug 6, 2024	Aug 6, 2024		
Daba: Land of Water Scar	Action role-playing	Dark Star	Dark Star	TBA	TBA	TBA		
The Dark Pictures Anthology: The Devil in Me	Interactive drama; Survival horror	Supermassive Games	Bandai Namco Entertainment	Unreleased	Nov 18, 2022	Nov 18, 2022		
The Dark Pictures Anthology: House of Ashes	Interactive drama; Survival horror	Supermassive Games	Bandai Namco Entertainment	Oct 22, 2021	Oct 22, 2021	Oct 22, 2021		
The Dark Pictures Anthology: Little Hope	Interactive drama; Survival horror	Supermassive Games	Bandai Namco Entertainment	Sep 27, 2022	Sep 27, 2022	Sep 27, 2022		
The Dark Pictures Anthology: Man of Medan	Interactive drama; Survival horror	Supermassive Games	Bandai Namco Entertainment	Sep 27, 2022	Sep 27, 2022	Sep 27, 2022		
Darksiders II: Deathinitive Edition	Action role-playing	Vigil Games	THQ Nordic	Oct 15, 2024	Oct 15, 2024	Oct 15, 2024		
Darq: Complete Edition	Psychological horror	Unfold Games	Feardemic	Mar 25, 2021	Mar 25, 2021	Mar 25, 2021		
Date Everything!	Dating sim	Sassy Chap Games	Team17	Unreleased	Jun 17, 2025	Jun 17, 2025		
Dave the Diver	Adventure	Mintrocket	Mintrocket	Apr 16, 2024	Apr 16, 2024	Apr 16, 2024		
Dauntless	Action role-playing	Phoenix Labs	Epic Games	Dec 2, 2021	Dec 2, 2021	Dec 2, 2021		
Dawn of the Monsters	Beat 'em up	13AM Games	WayForward	Mar 15, 2022	Mar 15, 2022	Mar 15, 2022		
Days Gone Remastered	Action-adventure	Bend Studio	Sony Interactive Entertainment	Apr 25, 2025	Apr 25, 2025	Apr 25, 2025		
Daymare: 1994 Sandcastle	Survival horror	Invader Studios	Leonardo Interactive	Aug 30, 2023	Aug 30, 2023	Aug 30, 2023		
Days of Doom	Strategy video game	SneakyBox	Atari, Inc.	Sep 21, 2023	Sep 21, 2023	Sep 21, 2023		
DC League of Super-Pets: The Adventures of Krypto and Ace	Rail shooter	PHL Collective	Outright Games	Sep 29, 2022	Sep 29, 2022	Sep 29, 2022		
DC Universe Online	Massively multiplayer online; action	Dimensional Ink Games	Daybreak Game Company	Unreleased	Mar 26, 2024	Mar 26, 2024		
Dead by Daylight	Survival horror	Behaviour Interactive	Behaviour Interactive	Nov 12, 2020	Nov 12, 2020	Nov 19, 2020	CB CP	
Deadcraft	Survival	Marvelous First Studio	JP: Marvelous; WW: Xseed Games	May 19, 2022	May 19, 2022	May 19, 2022		
Dead Island 2	Action role-playing	Dambuster Studios	Deep Silver	Apr 21, 2023	Apr 21, 2023	Apr 21, 2023	P	
Dead Rising Deluxe Remastered	Action-adventure	Capcom	Capcom	Sep 19, 2024	Sep 19, 2024	Sep 19, 2024	P	
Dead Space	Survival horror	Motive Studios	Electronic Arts	Jan 27, 2023	Jan 27, 2023	Jan 27, 2023		
Death's Door	Action-adventure	Acid Nerve	Devolver Digital	Nov 23, 2021	Nov 23, 2021	Nov 23, 2021		
Death Stranding 2: On the Beach	Action	Kojima Productions	Sony Interactive Entertainment	Jun 26, 2025	Jun 26, 2025	Jun 26, 2025		
Death Stranding Director's Cut	Action	Kojima Productions	Sony Interactive Entertainment	Sep 24, 2021	Sep 24, 2021	Sep 24, 2021		
Deathbound	Action role-playing	Trialforge Studio	Tate Multimedia	Aug 8, 2024	Aug 8, 2024	Aug 8, 2024		
Deathloop	Action-adventure	Arkane Studios	Bethesda Softworks	Sep 14, 2021	Sep 14, 2021	Sep 14, 2021		
Deathverse: Let It Die	Survival; action	SuperTrick Games	GungHo Online Entertainment	Sep 27, 2022	Sep 27, 2022	Sep 27, 2022		
Deceive Inc.	First-person shooter	Sweet Bandits Studios	Tripwire Interactive	Mar 21, 2023	Mar 21, 2023	Mar 21, 2023		
Deep Rock Galactic	First-person shooter	Ghost Ship Games	Coffee Stain Studios	Jan 4, 2022	Jan 4, 2022	Jan 4, 2022		
Deliver Us The Moon	Adventure	KeokeN Interactive	Wired Productions	Jun 23, 2022	Jun 23, 2022	Jun 23, 2022	CB	
Deltarune	Role-playing	Toby Fox	Toby Fox; 8-4	Jun 5, 2025	Jun 4, 2025	Jun 4, 2025		
Demon's Souls	Action role-playing	Bluepoint Games; Japan Studio	Sony Interactive Entertainment	Nov 12, 2020	Nov 12, 2020	Nov 19, 2020	P	
Demon Slayer: Kimetsu no Yaiba – The Hinokami Chronicles	Fighting	CyberConnect2	JP: Aniplex; WW: Sega	Oct 14, 2021	Oct 15, 2021	Oct 15, 2021		
Demon Turf	Platform	Fabraz	Playtonic Friends	Nov 4, 2021	Nov 4, 2021	Nov 4, 2021		
Destiny 2	First-person shooter	Bungie	Bungie	Dec 8, 2020	Dec 8, 2020	Dec 8, 2020	CB CP	
Destroy All Humans! 2: Reprobed	Action-adventure	Black Forest Games	THQ Nordic	Aug 30, 2022	Aug 30, 2022	Aug 30, 2022		
Destruction AllStars	Vehicular combat	Lucid Games; Wushu Studios	Sony Interactive Entertainment	Feb 2, 2021	Feb 2, 2021	Feb 2, 2021		
Deus Ex Remastered	Action role-playing; Stealth	Aspyr; Eidos-Montréal	Aspyr	Feb 5, 2026	Feb 5, 2026	Feb 5, 2026		
Devil May Cry 5: Special Edition	Action-adventure; hack and slash	Capcom	Capcom	Nov 12, 2020	Nov 12, 2020	Nov 19, 2020		
Diablo II: Resurrected	Action role-playing; hack and slash	Vicarious Visions	Blizzard Entertainment	Sep 23, 2021	Sep 23, 2021	Sep 23, 2021		
Diablo IV	Action role-playing; hack and slash	Blizzard Team 3; Blizzard Albany	Blizzard Entertainment	Jun 6, 2023	Jun 6, 2023	Jun 6, 2023	P	
Digimon Story: Time Stranger	RPG	Media. Vision Inc.	Bandai Namco Entertainment	Oct 3, 2025	Oct 3, 2025	Oct 3, 2025		
Dinos Reborn	Survival; action	HardCodeWay	Vision Edge Entertainment	TBA	TBA	TBA		
The DioField Chronicle	Tactical role-playing	Square Enix; Lancarse	Square Enix	Sep 22, 2022	Sep 22, 2022	Sep 22, 2022	CB	
Directive 8020	Interactive drama; Survival horror	Supermassive Games	Supermassive Games	May 12, 2026	May 12, 2026	May 12, 2026		
Dirt 5	Racing	Codemasters	Codemasters	Nov 12, 2020	Nov 12, 2020	Nov 19, 2020	CB	
Disciples: Liberation	Turn-based strategy	Frima Studio	Kalypso Media	Oct 21, 2021	Oct 21, 2021	Oct 21, 2021		
Disco Elysium: The Final Cut	Role-playing	ZA/UM	ZA/UM	Mar 30, 2021	Mar 30, 2021	Mar 30, 2021	CB	
Disgaea 6: Defiance of Destiny	Tactical role-playing	Nippon Ichi Software	Nippon Ichi Software	Jun 16, 2022	Jun 28, 2022	Jun 28, 2022		
Disgaea 7: Vows of the Virtueless	Tactical role-playing	Nippon Ichi Software	Nippon Ichi Software	Jan 26, 2023	Oct 3, 2023	Oct 3, 2023		
Disney Dreamlight Valley	Life simulation; adventure	Gameloft Montreal	Gameloft	Dec 5, 2023	Dec 5, 2023	Dec 5, 2023	CP	
Disney Speedstorm	Racing	Gameloft Barcelona	Gameloft	Sep 28, 2023	Sep 28, 2023	Sep 28, 2023	CP	
Dispatch	Adventure	AdHoc Studio	AdHoc Studio	Oct 22, 2025	Oct 22, 2025	Oct 22, 2025		
Divine Knockout	Fighting	Red Beard Games	Hi-Rez Studios	Dec 6, 2022	Dec 6, 2022	Dec 6, 2022	CP	
DNF Duel	Fighting	Neople; Arc System Works; Eighting	Nexon	Jun 28, 2022	Jun 28, 2022	Jun 28, 2022		
Doctor Simulator	Simulation	ASIMCORPORATION S.R.L.	ASIMCORPORATION S.R.L.	Apr 5, 2025	Apr 5, 2025	Apr 5, 2025		
Doctor Who: The Edge of Reality	Adventure	Maze Theory	BBC Studios; Just Add Water	Unreleased	Sep 30, 2021	Sep 30, 2021		
Doki Doki Literature Club Plus!	Visual novel	Team Salvato	Serenity Forge	Unreleased	Jun 30, 2021	Jun 30, 2021		
Dolmen	Action-adventure; role-playing	Massive Work Studio	Prime Matter	May 19, 2022	May 19, 2022	May 19, 2022		
Doom: The Dark Ages	First-person shooter	id Software	Bethesda Softworks	May 15, 2025	May 15, 2025	May 15, 2025		
Doom Eternal	First-person shooter	id Software	Bethesda Softworks	Jun 29, 2021	Jun 29, 2021	Jun 29, 2021	CB	
Double Dragon Gaiden: Rise of the Dragons	Beat 'em up; Roguelike	Secret Base	Modus Games	Jul 27, 2023	Jul 27, 2023	Jul 27, 2023		
Double Dragon Revive	Beat 'em up	Yuke's	Arc System Works	Oct 23, 2025	Oct 23, 2025	Oct 23, 2025		
Dragon Age: The Veilguard	Action role-playing	BioWare	Electronic Arts	Oct 31, 2024	Oct 31, 2024	Oct 31, 2024	P	
Dragon Ball FighterZ	Fighting; Adventure game	Arc System Works	Bandai Namco Entertainment	Feb 28, 2024	Feb 28, 2024	Feb 28, 2024		
Dragon Ball Xenoverse 2	Fighting; Role playing game	Dimps	Bandai Namco Entertainment	May 23, 2024	May 23, 2024	May 23, 2024		
Dragon Ball: Sparking! Zero	Fighting	Spike Chunsoft	Bandai Namco Entertainment	Oct 11, 2024	Oct 11, 2024	Oct 11, 2024		
Dragon Ball Z: Kakarot	Action role-playing	CyberConnect2	Bandai Namco Entertainment	Jan 12, 2023	Jan 13, 2023	Jan 13, 2023		
Dragon's Dogma 2	Action role-playing	Capcom	Capcom	Mar 22, 2024	Mar 22, 2024	Mar 22, 2024	P	
Dragon Quest III HD-2D Remake	Role-playing	Artdink	Square Enix	Nov 14, 2024	Nov 14, 2024	Nov 14, 2024		
Dragon Quest X Offline	Role-playing	Square Enix	Square Enix	Feb 26, 2022	Unreleased	Unreleased		
Dreaming Sarah	Adventure; platformer	Asteristic Game Studio	Ratalaika Games	Unreleased	Mar 5, 2021	Mar 5, 2021	CB	
Dreams of Another	Adventure	Q-Games	Q-Games	Oct 10, 2025	Oct 10, 2025	Oct 10, 2025		
Drift Master Simulator	Racing	GBT UI SOLUTIONS S.R.L.	GBT UI SOLUTIONS S.R.L.	Aug 28, 2024	Aug 28, 2024	Aug 28, 2024		
Drunken Superhero	Action	4 GLADIATORS	4 GLADIATORS	Mar 3, 2024	Mar 3, 2024	Mar 3, 2024		
Dungeons & Bombs	Puzzle	PigeonDev	Sometimes You	Unreleased	Feb 26, 2021	Feb 26, 2021		
Dungeons & Dragons: Dark Alliance	Role-playing	Tuque Games	Wizards of the Coast	Jun 22, 2021	Jun 22, 2021	Jun 22, 2021		
Dustborn	Action-adventure	Red Thread Games	Red Thread Games	TBA	TBA	TBA		
Dying: 1983	Adventure	Nekcom	2P Games	Feb 17, 2022	TBA	TBA		
Dying Light 2: Stay Human	Survival horror	Techland	Techland Publishing	Feb 4, 2022	Feb 4, 2022	Feb 4, 2022	P	
Dynasty Warriors 9: Empires	Hack and slash	Omega Force	Koei Tecmo	Dec 23, 2021	Feb 15, 2022	Feb 15, 2022		
Dynasty Warriors: Origins	Hack and Slash	Omega Force	Koei Tecmo	Jan 17, 2025	Jan 17, 2025	Jan 17, 2025	P	
Dysmantle	Action; adventure	10tons	10tons	Unreleased	Jan 19, 2022	Jan 19, 2022	CB	
Earth Defense Force: World Brothers 2	Action	Yuke's	D3 Publisher	Sep 25, 2024	Sep 25, 2024	Sep 25, 2024		
Earth Defense Force 6	Third-person shooter	Sandlot	D3 Publisher	Aug 25, 2022	July 25, 2024	July 25, 2024		
EA Sports College Football 25	Sports	EA Orlando	EA Sports	Jul 14, 2024	Jul 14, 2024	Jul 14, 2024	P	
EA Sports College Football 26	Sports	EA Orlando	EA Sports	Jul 10, 2025	Jul 10, 2025	Jul 10, 2025	P	
EA Sports FC 24	Sports	EA Vancouver	Electronic Arts	Sep 29, 2023	Sep 29, 2023	Sep 29, 2023		
EA Sports FC 25	Sports	EA Vancouver	Electronic Arts	Sep 27, 2024	Sep 27, 2024	Sep 27, 2024	P	
EA Sports FC 26	Sports	EA Vancouver	Electronic Arts	Sep 26, 2025	Sep 26, 2025	Sep 26, 2025		
EA Sports PGA Tour	Sports	EA Tiburon	Electronic Arts	Mar 24, 2023	Mar 24, 2023	Mar 24, 2023		
EA Sports UFC 5	Fighting	EA Sports	Electronic Arts	Oct 27, 2023	Oct 27, 2023	Oct 27, 2023	P	
EA Sports WRC	Racing	Codemasters	EA Sports	Nov 3, 2023	Nov 3, 2023	Nov 3, 2023		
Edge of Eternity	Role-playing	Midgard Studio	Dear Villagers	Aug 31, 2023	Feb 10, 2022	Feb 10, 2022		
eFootball 2022	Sports	Konami	Konami	Sep 30, 2021	Sep 30, 2021	Sep 30, 2021	CP	
Eiyuden Chronicle: Hundred Heroes	Role-playing	Rabbit & Bear Studios	505 Games	Apr 23, 2024	Apr 23, 2024	Apr 23, 2024		
Eiyuden Chronicle: Rising	Action role-playing	Rabbit & Bear Studios	505 Games	May 10, 2022	May 10, 2022	May 10, 2022		
ELEX II	Action role-playing	Piranha Bytes	THQ Nordic	Mar 1, 2022	Mar 1, 2022	Mar 1, 2022		
Elden Ring	Action role-playing	FromSoftware	Bandai Namco Entertainment	Feb 25, 2022	Feb 25, 2022	Feb 25, 2022	CB	
Elden Ring Nightreign	Action role-playing	FromSoftware	Bandai Namco Entertainment	May 30, 2025	May 30, 2025	May 30, 2025		
The Elder Scrolls Online	Massively multiplayer online role-playing	ZeniMax Online Studios	Bethesda Softworks	Jun 15, 2021	Jun 15, 2021	Jun 15, 2021	CB	
The Elder Scrolls IV: Oblivion Remastered	Action role-playing	Virtuos; Bethesda Game Studios	Bethesda Softworks	Apr 22, 2025	Apr 22, 2025	Apr 22, 2025	P	
The Elder Scrolls V: Skyrim	Action role-playing	Bethesda Game Studios	Bethesda Softworks	Nov 11, 2021	Nov 11, 2021	Nov 11, 2021	CB	
Enchanted Portals	Shoot 'em Up	Xixo Games Studio	Xixo Games Studio	Sep 8, 2023	Sep 8, 2023	Sep 8, 2023		
Endless Dungeon	Roguelike	Amplitude Studios	Sega	Oct 19, 2023	Oct 19, 2023	Oct 19, 2023		
Endling: Extinction is Forever	Adventure; Survival	Herobeat Studios	HandyGames	Unreleased	Nov 3, 2022	Nov 3, 2022	CB	
Enlisted	First-person shooter	Darkflow Software	Gaijin Entertainment	Mar 2, 2021	Mar 2, 2021	Mar 2, 2021		
The Entropy Centre	Puzzle	Stubby Games	Playstack	Nov 3, 2022	Nov 3, 2022	Nov 3, 2022		
Escape from Life Inc	Adventure	Sometimes You	Sometimes You	Mar 30, 2021	Mar 30, 2021	Mar 30, 2021		
Escape the Glitch	Horror	Oiven Games	Oiven Games	Unreleased	Feb 20, 2024	Feb 20, 2024		
Escape the Glitch 2: Backrooms	Horror	Oiven Games	Oiven Games	Unreleased	Apr 23, 2024	Apr 23, 2024		
Eternal	Massively multiplayer online role-playing	Asobimo	Asobimo	Jul 19, 2021	Unreleased	Unreleased		
Ever Forward	Puzzle; Adventure	Pathea Games	PM Studios	Aug 10, 2021	Aug 10, 2021	Aug 10, 2021		
Evergate	Puzzle-platform	Stone Lantern Games	PQube	Jun 4, 2021	Jun 4, 2021	Jun 4, 2021		
Evil Dead: The Game	Survival horror	Saber Interactive	Boss Team Games	May 13, 2022	May 13, 2022	May 13, 2022	CP	
Evil Eyes	Action	4 GLADIATORS	4 GLADIATORS	Mar 2, 2024	Mar 2, 2024	Mar 2, 2024		
Evil Genius 2: World Domination	Real-time strategy; simulation	Rebellion Developments	Rebellion Developments	Unreleased	Nov 30, 2021	Nov 30, 2021		
Evil West	Action-adventure	Flying Wild Hog	Focus Home Interactive	Nov 22, 2022	Nov 22, 2022	Nov 22, 2022		
Exiledge	Third-person shooter	Enigmatrix	Enigmatrix	TBA	TBA	TBA		
Exodus	Role-playing	Archetype Entertainment	Wizards of the Coast	2027	2027	2027		
Exophobia	First-person shooter	Zarc Attack	PM Studios	Unreleased	Jul 23, 2024	Jul 23, 2024		
Exoprimal	Survival horror; third-person shooter	Capcom	Capcom	Jul 14, 2023	Jul 14, 2023	Jul 14, 2023		
F1 2021	Racing	Codemasters	Electronic Arts	Jul 16, 2021	Jul 16, 2021	Jul 16, 2021		
F1 22	Racing	Codemasters	Electronic Arts	Jul 1, 2022	Jul 1, 2022	Jul 1, 2022		
F1 23	Racing	Codemasters	Electronic Arts	Jun 16, 2023	Jun 16, 2023	Jun 16, 2023		
F1 24	Racing	Codemasters	Electronic Arts	May 31, 2024	May 31, 2024	May 31, 2024	P	
F1 25	Racing	Codemasters	Electronic Arts	May 30, 2025	May 30, 2025	May 30, 2025	P	
F1 Manager 2022	Business simulation	Frontier Developments	Frontier Developments	Aug 30, 2022	Aug 30, 2022	Aug 30, 2022		
F1 Manager 2023	Business simulation	Frontier Developments	Frontier Developments	Jul 31, 2023	Jul 31, 2023	Jul 31, 2023		
F1 Manager 2024	Business simulation	Frontier Developments	Frontier Developments	Jul 23, 2024	Jul 23, 2024	Jul 23, 2024		
Fable	Action role-playing	Playground Games	Xbox Game Studios	Feb 23, 2027	Feb 23, 2027	Feb 23, 2027		
Fae Farm	Farm life sim	Phoenix Labs	Phoenix Labs	Oct 24, 2024	Oct 24, 2024	Oct 24, 2024		
The Falconeer: Warrior Edition	Aerial combat	Tomas Sala	Wired Productions	Aug 5, 2021	Aug 5, 2021	Aug 5, 2021		
Fall Guys	Battle royale; platform	Mediatonic	Epic Games	Jun 21, 2022	Jun 21, 2022	Jun 21, 2022	CP	
Fallout 4	Action role-playing	Bethesda Game Studios	Bethesda Softworks	Apr 25, 2024	Apr 25, 2024	Apr 25, 2024		
Far Cry 6	First-person shooter	Ubisoft Toronto	Ubisoft	Oct 7, 2021	Oct 7, 2021	Oct 7, 2021	CB	
Farming Simulator 22	Simulation	Giants Software	Giants Software	Nov 24, 2021	Nov 22, 2021	Nov 22, 2021		
Farming Simulator 25	Simulation	Giants Software	Giants Software	Nov 12, 2024	Nov 12, 2024	Nov 12, 2024		
Fatal Frame: Maiden of Black Water	Survival horror	Koei Tecmo	Koei Tecmo	Oct 28, 2021	Oct 28, 2021	Oct 28, 2021		
Fatal Frame: Mask of the Lunar Eclipse	Survival horror	Koei Tecmo; Grasshopper Manufacture	Koei Tecmo	Mar 9, 2023	Mar 9, 2023	Mar 9, 2023		
Fatal Fury: City of the Wolves	Fighting	SNK	SNK	Apr 24, 2025	Apr 24, 2025	Apr 24, 2025		
Feed My Raptor	Casual	Nextgo24 UG	Nextgo24 UG	Jun 23, 2024	Jun 23, 2024	Jun 23, 2024		
Feed My Raptor 2	Casual	Nextgo24 UG	Nextgo24 UG	Apr 12, 2025	Apr 12, 2025	Apr 12, 2025		
FIFA 21	Sports	EA Vancouver	Electronic Arts	Dec 4, 2020	Dec 4, 2020	Dec 4, 2020		
FIFA 22	Sports	EA Vancouver	Electronic Arts	Oct 1, 2021	Oct 1, 2021	Oct 1, 2021		
FIFA 23	Sports	EA Vancouver	Electronic Arts	Sep 30, 2022	Sep 30, 2022	Sep 30, 2022		
Final Fantasy VII Rebirth	Action role-playing	Square Enix	Square Enix	Feb 29, 2024	Feb 29, 2024	Feb 29, 2024	P	
Final Fantasy VII Remake Intergrade	Action role-playing	Square Enix	Square Enix	Jun 10, 2021	Jun 10, 2021	Jun 10, 2021	CB	
Final Fantasy XIV	Massively multiplayer online role-playing	Square Enix	Square Enix	May 25, 2021	May 25, 2021	May 25, 2021	CB CP	
Final Fantasy XVI	Action role-playing	Square Enix	Square Enix	Jun 22, 2023	Jun 22, 2023	Jun 22, 2023		
Finger Fitness	Arcade; Casual	TERNOX	TERNOX	Oct 10, 2022	Nov 14, 2021	Nov 14, 2021		
Fire Commander	Real-time tactics	Atomix Wolf; Pixel Crow	Movie Games	TBA	TBA	TBA		
The First Berserker: Khazan	Action role-playing; Adventure	Neople	Nexon	Mar 27, 2025	Mar 27, 2025	Mar 27, 2025		
First Class Trouble	Party; social deduction	Invisible Walls	Versus Evil	Nov 2, 2021	Nov 2, 2021	Nov 2, 2021		
The First Descendant	Third-person shooter	Nexon	Nexon	Jul 2, 2024	Jul 2, 2024	Jul 2, 2024	P	
F.I.S.T.: Forged In Shadow Torch	Action	TiGames	Bilibili	Sep 7, 2021	Sep 7, 2021	Sep 7, 2021		
Five Nights at Freddy's: Help Wanted	Survival horror	Steel Wool Studios	Steel Wool Studios	Nov 21, 2023	Nov 21, 2023	Nov 21, 2023		
Five Nights at Freddy's: Into the Pit	Horror; adventure	Mega Cat Studios	Mega Cat Studios	Sep 27, 2024	Sep 27, 2024	Sep 27, 2024		
Five Nights at Freddy's: Security Breach	Survival horror	Steel Wool Studios	ScottGames	Dec 16, 2021	Dec 16, 2021	Dec 16, 2021		
Flashback 2	Action	Microids	Microids	Nov 16, 2023	Nov 16, 2023	Nov 16, 2023		
Flea Madness	Action	Missset	Crytivo Games	TBA	TBA	TBA		
Flipper Mechanic	Simulation	SimFabric	SimFabric	TBA	TBA	TBA		
Flintlock: The Siege of Dawn	Action role-playing	A44 Games	Kepler Interactive	Jul 18, 2024	Jul 18, 2024	Jul 18, 2024		
Foamstars	Action	Square Enix	Square Enix	Feb 6, 2024	Feb 6, 2024	Feb 6, 2024		
Fobia: St. Dinfna Hotel	Psychological horror	Pulsatrix Studios	Maximum Games	Jun 28, 2022	Jun 28, 2022	Jun 28, 2022		
Football Manager 2023 Console	Sports	Sports Interactive	Sega	Feb 1, 2023	Feb 1, 2023	Feb 1, 2023		
Football Manager 2024 Console	Sports	Sports Interactive	Sega	Nov 6, 2023	Nov 6, 2023	Nov 6, 2023		
Football Manager 26 Console	Sports	Sports Interactive	Sega	Nov 4, 2025	Nov 4, 2025	Nov 4, 2025		
Foreclosed	Action-adventure	Antab	Merge Games	Aug 12, 2021	Aug 12, 2021	Aug 12, 2021		
The Forest Cathedral	Adventure; Puzzle	Brian Wilson	Whitethorn Games	Sep 29, 2024	Nov 6, 2023	Nov 6, 2023		
The Forgotten City	Adventure	Modern Storyteller	Dear Villagers	Mar 2, 2022	Jul 28, 2021	Jul 28, 2021		
Forspoken	Action role-playing	Luminous Productions	Square Enix	Jan 24, 2023	Jan 24, 2023	Jan 24, 2023		
Fortnite	Battle royale; sandbox; survival	Epic Games	Epic Games	Nov 12, 2020	Nov 12, 2020	Nov 19, 2020	CP P	
Fort Solis	Horror; Adventure	Fallen Leaf; Black Drakkar Games	Dear Villagers	Sep 6, 2023	Aug 22, 2023	Aug 22, 2023		
Forza Horizon 5	Racing	Playground Games	Xbox Game Studios	Apr 29, 2025	Apr 29, 2025	Apr 29, 2025		
Freddy Spaghetti	Action-adventure; simulation	Playful Pasta	Ratalaika Games	Unreleased	Dec 16, 2020	Dec 16, 2020	CB	
Freedom Planet 2	Platform	GalaxyTrail	GalaxyTrail	Apr 4, 2024	Apr 4, 2024	Apr 4, 2024		
Freedom Wars Remastered	Action role-playing	Dimps	Bandai Namco Entertainment	Jan 9, 2025	Jan 10, 2025	Jan 10, 2025		
Frog Jumper	Action	Oiven Games	Oiven Games	Unreleased	Jun 20, 2024	Jun 20, 2024		
Fruit Collector	Casual	Colosseum Studio	Colosseum Studio	Apr 24, 2025	Apr 24, 2025	Apr 24, 2025		
Fuga: Melodies of Steel	Tactical role-playing	CyberConnect2	CyberConnect2	Jul 29, 2021	Jul 29, 2021	Jul 29, 2021		
Fuga: Melodies of Steel 2	Tactical role-playing	CyberConnect2	CyberConnect2	May 11, 2023	May 11, 2023	May 11, 2023		
Funko Fusion	Action-Adventure	10:10 Games	10:10 Games	Sep 13, 2024	Sep 13, 2024	Sep 13, 2024		
Galacticare	Business simulation	Brightrock Games	Cult Games	May 23, 2024	May 23, 2024	May 23, 2024		
Gamer Quest	Casual	Two Llamas s.r.o.	Two Llamas s.r.o.	Oct 14, 2024	Oct 14, 2024	Oct 14, 2024		
Garten of Banban	Horror; Adventure; Puzzle	Euphoric Brothers	Feardemic	May 30, 2024	May 30, 2024	May 30, 2024		
Garten of Banban II	Horror; Adventure; Puzzle	Euphoric Brothers	Feardemic	May 30, 2024	May 30, 2024	May 30, 2024		
Garten of Banban III	Horror; Adventure; Puzzle	Euphoric Brothers	Feardemic	May 30, 2024	May 30, 2024	May 30, 2024		
Garten of Banban IV	Horror; Adventure; Puzzle	Euphoric Brothers	Feardemic	May 30, 2024	May 30, 2024	May 30, 2024		
Gears of War: Reloaded	Third-person shooter	The Coalition; Sumo Digital; Disbelief	Xbox Game Studios	Aug 26, 2025	Aug 26, 2025	Aug 26, 2025		
Genshin Impact	Action role-playing	miHoYo	miHoYo	Apr 28, 2021	Apr 28, 2021	Apr 28, 2021		
Ghost of Tsushima Director's Cut	Action-adventure	Sucker Punch Productions	Sony Interactive Entertainment	Aug 20, 2021	Aug 20, 2021	Aug 20, 2021		
Ghost of Tsushima: Legends	Action-adventure	Sucker Punch Productions	Sony Interactive Entertainment	Sep 3, 2021	Sep 3, 2021	Sep 3, 2021		
Ghost of Yōtei	Action-adventure	Sucker Punch Productions	Sony Interactive Entertainment	Oct 2, 2025	Oct 2, 2025	Oct 2, 2025		
Ghostrunner	Action; platform	One More Level	All in! Games; 505 Games	Sep 28, 2021	Sep 28, 2021	Sep 28, 2021	CB	
Ghostrunner 2	Action; platform	One More Level	505 Games	Oct 26, 2023	Oct 26, 2023	Oct 26, 2023		
Ghostwire: Tokyo	Action-adventure	Tango Gameworks	Bethesda Softworks	Mar 25, 2022	Mar 25, 2022	Mar 25, 2022		
Glowface	Adventure	ThiGames	ThiGames	Jun 21, 2024	Jun 21, 2024	Jun 21, 2024		
Glowface in Love	Adventure	ThiGames	ThiGames	Aug 9, 2024	Aug 9, 2024	Aug 9, 2024		
Godfall	Action role-playing	Counterplay Games	Gearbox Publishing	Nov 12, 2020	Nov 12, 2020	Nov 19, 2020	CB	
God of War Ragnarök	Action-adventure; hack and slash	Santa Monica Studio	Sony Interactive Entertainment	Nov 9, 2022	Nov 9, 2022	Nov 9, 2022	P	
God of War Sons of Sparta	Action-platformer	Santa Monica Studio, Mega Cat Studios	Sony Interactive Entertainment	Feb 12, 2026	Feb 12, 2026	Feb 12, 2026		
Goals	Sports	Goals AB	Goals AB	Jun 4, 2026	Jun 4, 2026	Jun 4, 2026		
Goat Simulator: Remastered	Action; simulation	Coffee Stain North	Coffee Stain Publishing	Nov 7, 2024	Nov 7, 2024	Nov 7, 2024		
Goat Simulator 3	Action; simulation	Coffee Stain North	Coffee Stain Publishing	Nov 17, 2022	Nov 17, 2022	Nov 17, 2022		
The God Slayer	Action role-playing	Pathea Games	Pathea Games	2027	2027	2027		
Golden Racing	Casual; Driving; Racing	Colosseum Studio	Colosseum Studio	Mar 14, 2025	Mar 14, 2025	Mar 14, 2025		
Goonya Fighter: Jiggly Haptic Edition	Fighting; party	Mutan	Mutan	Nov 12, 2020	Nov 12, 2020	Nov 19, 2020		
Goodbye Volcano High	Adventure	KO_OP	KO_OP	Aug 29, 2023	Aug 29, 2023	Aug 29, 2023		
Goodnight Universe	Adventure	Nice Dream	Skybound Games	Nov 11, 2025	Nov 11, 2025	Nov 11, 2025		
Gotham Knights	Action-adventure	WB Games Montréal	WB Games	Oct 25, 2022	Oct 25, 2022	Oct 25, 2022		
Gothic Remake	Action role-playing	THQ Nordic Barcelona	THQ Nordic	Jun 5, 2026	Jun 5, 2026	Jun 5, 2026		
Gran Turismo 7	Racing; simulation	Polyphony Digital	Sony Interactive Entertainment	Mar 4, 2022	Mar 4, 2022	Mar 4, 2022	P	
Granblue Fantasy: Relink	Action role-playing	Cygames	Cygames	Feb 1, 2024	Feb 1, 2024	Feb 1, 2024		
Granblue Fantasy Versus: Rising	Fighting	Arc System Works	Cygames	Dec 14, 2023	Dec 14, 2023	Dec 14, 2023		
Grand Theft Auto Online	Action-adventure	Rockstar North	Rockstar Games	Mar 15, 2022	Mar 15, 2022	Mar 15, 2022		
Grand Theft Auto: The Trilogy – The Definitive Edition	Action-adventure	Grove Street Games	Rockstar Games	Nov 11, 2021	Nov 11, 2021	Nov 11, 2021		
Grand Theft Auto V	Action-adventure	Rockstar North	Rockstar Games	Mar 15, 2022	Mar 15, 2022	Mar 15, 2022		
Grand Theft Auto VI	Action-adventure	Rockstar Games	Rockstar Games	Nov 19, 2026	Nov 19, 2026	Nov 19, 2026		
Graven	Action-adventure; first-person shooter	Slipgate Ironworks	3D Realms; 1C Entertainment	Jun 25, 2024	Jun 25, 2024	Jun 25, 2024		
GraviFire	Puzzle	Potata Company	Sometimes You	Unreleased	Mar 3, 2021	Mar 3, 2021		
GreedFall	Action-role playing	Spiders	Focus Home Interactive	Jun 30, 2021	Jun 30, 2021	Jun 30, 2021		
Grid Legends	Racing	Codemasters	Electronic Arts	Feb 25, 2022	Feb 25, 2022	Feb 25, 2022		
Grounded	Survival	Obsidian Entertainment	Xbox Game Studios	Apr 16, 2024	Apr 16, 2024	Apr 16, 2024		
Marvel's Guardians of the Galaxy	Action-adventure	Eidos-Montréal	Square Enix	Oct 26, 2021	Oct 26, 2021	Oct 26, 2021		
Guilty Gear Strive	Fighting	Arc System Works	Arc System Works	Jun 11, 2021	Jun 11, 2021	Jun 11, 2021	CB	
Gundam Breaker 4	Adventure; Role-playing; Fighting	Crafts & Meister	Bandai Namco Entertainment	Aug 29, 2024	Aug 29, 2024	Aug 29, 2024		
Gungrave G.O.R.E.	Third-person shooter	Iggymob	Prime Matter	Nov 22, 2022	Nov 22, 2022	Nov 22, 2022		
Gunship: Zombie	Action	Oiven Games	Oiven Games	Unreleased	Apr 19, 2025	Apr 19, 2025		
Gunvolt Chronicles Luminous Avenger iX 2	Platform	Inti Creates	Inti Creates	Jan 27, 2022	Jan 27, 2022	Jan 27, 2022		
Gylt	Survival horror	Tequila Works	Tequila Works	Jul 6, 2023	Jul 6, 2023	Jul 6, 2023		
Halloween Candy Run	Action	Smobile	Smobile	Oct 20, 2022	Oct 20, 2022	Oct 20, 2022		
Hades	Action role-playing	Supergiant Games	Supergiant Games	Aug 13, 2021	Aug 13, 2021	Aug 13, 2021		
Hang Glider Simulator	Simulation	ASIMCORPORATION S.R.L.	ASIMCORPORATION S.R.L.	Oct 24, 2024	Oct 24, 2024	Oct 24, 2024		
Haunted Space	Action; horror	Italian Games Factory	Merge Games	TBA	TBA	TBA		
Harry Potter: Quidditch Champions	Sports	Unbroken Studios	Warner Bros. Games	Sep 3, 2024	Sep 3, 2024	Sep 3, 2024		
Haven	Role-playing; adventure	The Game Bakers	The Game Bakers	Dec 3, 2020	Dec 3, 2020	Dec 3, 2020		
Heavenly Bodies	Space station simulation	2pt Interactive	2pt Interactive	Dec 7, 2021	Dec 7, 2021	Dec 7, 2021		
Heist Man	Action	Two Llamas s.r.o.	Two Llamas s.r.o.	May 14, 2025	May 14, 2025	May 14, 2025		
Helldivers II	Third-person shooter	Arrowhead Game Studios	Sony Interactive Entertainment	Feb 8, 2024	Feb 8, 2024	Feb 8, 2024		
Hell Is Us	Action-adventure	Rogue Factor	Nacon	Sep 4, 2025	Sep 4, 2025	Sep 4, 2025	P	
Hell Let Loose	First-person shooter	Black Matter	Team17	Oct 5, 2021	Oct 5, 2021	Oct 5, 2021		
Hellpoint	Action role-playing	Cradle Games	TinyBuild	Jul 12, 2022	Jul 12, 2022	Jul 12, 2022	CB	
Hello Neighbor 2	Stealth; survival horror	Eerie Guest	TinyBuild	Dec 6, 2022	Dec 6, 2022	Dec 6, 2022		
Hi-Fi Rush	Action; rhythm; beat 'em up; hack and slash	Tango Gameworks	Bethesda Softworks	Mar 18, 2024	Mar 18, 2024	Mar 18, 2024		
Hitman 3	Stealth	IO Interactive	IO Interactive	Aug 25, 2021	Jan 20, 2021	Jan 20, 2021	CB (Note: Upgrade available only for owners of the Digital Edition.)	
Hogwarts Legacy	Action role-playing	Avalanche Software	Portkey Games	Feb 10, 2023	Feb 10, 2023	Feb 10, 2023	P	
Hollow Knight: Silksong	Metroidvania	Team Cherry	Team Cherry	Sep 4, 2025	Sep 4, 2025	Sep 4, 2025		
Hood: Outlaws & Legends	Action-adventure	Sumo Digital	Focus Home Interactive	May 10, 2021	May 10, 2021	May 10, 2021		
Horizon Forbidden West	Action role-playing	Guerrilla Games	Sony Interactive Entertainment	Feb 18, 2022	Feb 18, 2022	Feb 18, 2022	CB P	
Horizon Zero Dawn Remastered	Action role-playing	Guerrilla Games	Sony Interactive Entertainment	Oct 31, 2024	Oct 31, 2024	Oct 31, 2024	P	
Hot Wheels Monster Trucks: Stunt Mayhem	Racing	3DClouds	GameMill Entertainment	Oct 18, 2024	Oct 18, 2024	Oct 18, 2024		
Hot Wheels Unleashed	Racing	Milestone	Milestone	Sep 30, 2021	Sep 30, 2021	Sep 30, 2021		
Hot Wheels Unleashed 2: Turbocharged	Racing	Milestone	Milestone	Oct 19, 2023	Oct 19, 2023	Oct 19, 2023		
Hotel Life: A Resort Simulator	Business simulation	RingZero Game Studio	Nacon	Aug 26, 2021	Aug 26, 2021	Aug 26, 2021		
How To: Superhero!	Arcade	4 GLADIATORS	4 GLADIATORS	Dec 8, 2024	Dec 8, 2024	Dec 8, 2024		
Howl	Puzzle	Mi'pu'mi Games	Astragon Entertainment	Jan 26, 2024	Jan 26, 2024	Jan 26, 2024		
Hunter's Arena: Legends	Massively multiplayer online role-playing	Mantisco	Mantisco	Aug 3, 2021	Aug 3, 2021	Aug 3, 2021		
Human: Fall Flat	Puzzle-platform	No Brakes Games	Curve Digital	Unreleased	Jun 24, 2021	Jun 24, 2021		
Hyper Rider	Driving; Racing	CUDIT	CUDIT	Oct 6, 2024	Oct 6, 2024	Oct 6, 2024		
Hyper Turbo Boost	Driving; Racing	e-llusiontertainment	e-llusiontertainment	Mar 14, 2024	Mar 14, 2024	Mar 14, 2024		
I Am Dead	Adventure	Hollow Ponds	Annapurna Interactive	Aug 9, 2021	Aug 9, 2021	Aug 9, 2021		
Ice Jump	Casual	Colosseum Studio	Colosseum Studio	May 7, 2025	May 7, 2025	May 7, 2025		
Immortals Fenyx Rising	Action-adventure	Ubisoft Quebec	Ubisoft	Dec 3, 2020	Dec 3, 2020	Dec 3, 2020	CB	
Independence Day Run	Casual	Smobile	Smobile	Dec 15, 2022	Dec 15, 2022	Dec 15, 2022		
Indiana Jones and the Great Circle	Action-adventure; Stealth	MachineGames	Bethesda Softworks	Apr 17, 2025	Apr 17, 2025	Apr 17, 2025		
Infinity Nikki	Action-adventure; Dress-up	Papergames	CHN: Papergames; TWN/HKG/MAC: Fearless; WW: Infold Games	Dec 5, 2024	Dec 5, 2024	Dec 5, 2024		
Infliction: Extended Cut	Adventure; horror	Caustic Reality	Blowfish Studios	Unreleased	Dec 22, 2020	Dec 23, 2020		
In Rays of the Light	Action-adventure	Sergey Noskov	Sometimes You	Unreleased	Mar 17, 2021	Mar 17, 2021		
In Sound Mind	Psychological Horror	We Create Stuff	Modus Games	Unreleased	Sep 28, 2021	Sep 28, 2021		
In Stars and Time	Role-playing	insertdisc5	Armor Games Studios	Nov 20, 2023	Nov 20, 2023	Nov 20, 2023		
Instruments of Destruction	Simulation	Radiangames	Secret Mode	Oct 23, 2025	Oct 23, 2025	Oct 23, 2025		
Insurgency: Sandstorm	Tactical Shooter	New World Interactive	Focus Home Interactive	Jan 30, 2024	Jan 30, 2024	Jan 30, 2024		
Interaction Isn't Explicit	Shooter; Casual	Fears Ahead Studios	Fears Ahead Studios	Jan 14, 2024	Jan 14, 2024	Jan 14, 2024		
Invincible VS	Fighting	Quarter Up	Skybound Games	Apr 30, 2026	Apr 30, 2026	Apr 30, 2026		
Iron Harvest	Real-time strategy	King Art Games	Deep Silver	Oct 26, 2021	Oct 26, 2021	Oct 26, 2021		
It Takes Two	Action-adventure; platform	Hazelight Studios	Electronic Arts	Mar 26, 2021	Mar 26, 2021	Mar 26, 2021		
I Was a Teenage Exocolonist	Visual novel; Role-playing; Simulation; Strategy	Northway Games	Finji	Unreleased	Aug 25, 2022	Aug 25, 2022		
Jett: The Far Shore	Action-adventure	Superbrothers; Pine Scented	Superbrothers	Oct 5, 2021	Oct 5, 2021	Oct 5, 2021		
Jigsaw Chronicles: Heroes of Legend	Puzzle	CUDIT	CUDIT	Sep 21, 2024	Sep 21, 2024	Sep 21, 2024		
Jigsaw Chronicles: Most Wanted	Puzzle	CUDIT	CUDIT	Dec 5, 2024	Dec 5, 2024	Dec 5, 2024		
John Carpenter's Toxic Commando	First-person shooter	Saber Interactive	Focus Entertainment	Mar 12, 2026	Mar 12, 2026	Mar 12, 2026		
JoJo's Bizarre Adventure: All Star Battle R	Fighting	CyberConnect2	Bandai Namco Entertainment	Sep 1, 2022	Sep 2, 2022	Sep 2, 2022		
Journey to the Savage Planet	First-person shooter	Raccoon Logic	505 Games	Feb 14, 2023	Feb 14, 2023	Feb 14, 2023		
Judgment	Action-adventure	Ryu Ga Gotoku Studio	Sega	Apr 23, 2021	Apr 23, 2021	Apr 23, 2021		
A Juggler's Tale	Platform	Kaleidoscube	Mixtvision Games	Unreleased	Sep 29, 2021	Sep 29, 2021		
Jump Challenge!	Arcade	Source Byte	Source Byte	Nov 18, 2022	Nov 18, 2022	Nov 18, 2022		
JumpJumpJump!	Casual	Colosseum Studio	Colosseum Studio	Mar 4, 2025	Mar 4, 2025	Mar 4, 2025		
Jurassic World Evolution 2	Business simulation	Frontier Developments	Frontier Developments	Nov 9, 2021	Nov 9, 2021	Nov 9, 2021		
Jusant	Puzzle; Platform	Don't Nod	Don't Nod	Jan 26, 2024	Oct 31, 2023	Oct 31, 2023		
Just Dance 2021	Rhythm	Ubisoft Paris	Ubisoft	Nov 24, 2020	Nov 24, 2020	Nov 24, 2020	CB	
Just Dance 2022	Rhythm	Ubisoft Paris	Ubisoft	Nov 4, 2021	Nov 4, 2021	Nov 4, 2021	CB	
Just Dance 2023 Edition	Rhythm	Ubisoft Paris	Ubisoft	Nov 22, 2022	Nov 22, 2022	Nov 22, 2022		
Just Dance 2024 Edition	Rhythm	Ubisoft Paris	Ubisoft	Oct 24, 2023	Oct 24, 2023	Oct 24, 2023		
Just Dance 2025 Edition	Rhythm	Ubisoft Paris	Ubisoft	Oct 15, 2024	Oct 15, 2024	Oct 15, 2024		
Jydge	Shooter	10tons	10tons	Unreleased	Nov 19, 2020	Nov 19, 2020	CB	
Kao the Kangaroo	Platform	Tate Multimedia	Tate Multimedia	Unreleased	May 27, 2022	May 27, 2022		
Kena: Bridge of Spirits	Action-adventure	Ember Lab	Ember Lab	Sep 21, 2021	Sep 21, 2021	Sep 21, 2021	CB	
Kerbal Space Program 2	Space flight simulation	Intercept Games	Private Division	TBA	TBA	TBA		
Kerbal Space Program: Enhanced Edition	Space flight simulation	Squad	Private Division	Unreleased	Sep 24, 2021	Sep 24, 2021	CB	
KeyWe	Puzzle	Stonewheat & Sons	Sold Out	Aug 31, 2021	Aug 31, 2021	Aug 31, 2021		
Kid A Mnesia Exhibition	Exploration	Namethemachine; Arbitrarily Good Productions	Epic Games	Nov 18, 2021	Nov 18, 2021	Nov 18, 2021		
Killing Floor 3	Survival horror	Tripwire Interactive	Tripwire Interactive	Unreleased	Jul 24, 2025	Jul 24, 2025		
King Arthur: Knight's Tale	Tactical role-playing	NeocoreGames	NeocoreGames	TBA	TBA	TBA		
Killer Klowns from Outer Space: The Game	Survival Horror	IllFonic; Teravision Games	IllFonic	Unreleased	Jun 4, 2024	Unreleased		
King Oddball	Puzzle	10tons	10tons	Unreleased	Nov 12, 2020	Nov 12, 2020	CB	
The King of Fighters XV	Fighting	SNK	SNK	Feb 17, 2022	Feb 17, 2022	Feb 17, 2022		
Kingdoms and Castles	City-builder	Lion Shield	Lion Shield	Dec 22, 2024	Mar 21, 2024	Mar 21, 2024		
Kingdom of Arcadia	Action-adventure	Spoonbox Studio	EastAsiaSoft	Unreleased	Apr 14, 2021	Apr 13, 2021		
Kingdom Come: Deliverance II	Role Playing Games	Warhorse Studios	Deep Silver	Feb 4, 2025	Feb 4, 2025	Feb 4, 2025	P	
Kitaria Fables	Action role-playing; farming simulation	Twin Hearts	PQube	Unreleased	Sep 2, 2021	Sep 2, 2021	CB	
Klonoa Phantasy Reverie Series	Platform	Monkey Craft	Bandai Namco Entertainment	Jul 7, 2022	Jul 7, 2022	Jul 7, 2022		
Knives Out: Extreme	Third-person shooter	NetEase	NetEase	TBA	TBA	TBA		
Knockout City	Sports	Velan Studios	Electronic Arts	May 20, 2021	May 20, 2021	May 20, 2021		
Koira	Adventure	Studio Tolima	Don't Nod	Apr 17, 2025	Apr 17, 2025	Apr 17, 2025		
Koumajou Densetsu: Scarlet Symphony	Action-adventure	Frontier Aja	CFK	Aug 8, 2024	Aug 8, 2024	Aug 8, 2024		
Kusan: City of Wolves	Top-down shooter	CIRCLEfromDOT	PQube	Jul 30, 2026	Jul 30, 2026	Jul 30, 2026		
Labyrinth Run	Casual	Colosseum Studio	Colosseum Studio	May 29, 2025	May 29, 2025	May 29, 2025		
Lake	Graphic adventure	Gamious	Whitethorn Games	Dec 4, 2023	Apr 8, 2022	Apr 8, 2022		
The Last Oricru	Action role-playing	GoldKnights	Prime Matter	Oct 13, 2022	Oct 13, 2022	Oct 13, 2022		
The Last of Us Part I	Action-adventure	Naughty Dog	Sony Interactive Entertainment	Sep 2, 2022	Sep 2, 2022	Sep 2, 2022	P	
The Last of Us Part II Remastered	Action-adventure	Naughty Dog	Sony Interactive Entertainment	Jan 19, 2024	Jan 19, 2024	Jan 19, 2024	P	
The Last Stand: Aftermath	Roguelike	Con Artist Games	Armor Games Studios	Nov 16, 2021	Nov 16, 2021	Nov 16, 2021		
Last Stop	Adventure	Variable State	Annapurna Interactive	Jul 22, 2021	Jul 22, 2021	Jul 22, 2021		
The Last Worker	Adventure	Oiffy; Wolf & Wood	Wired Productions	Mar 30, 2023	Mar 30, 2023	Mar 30, 2023		
Legacy of Kain: Soul Reaver 1 & 2 Remastered	Action-adventure	Aspyr	Aspyr	Dec 10, 2024	Dec 10, 2024	Dec 10, 2024		
The Legend of Cyber Cowboy	Shooter; Action	EastAsiaSoft	EastAsiaSoft	Jan 1, 2025	Jan 1, 2025	Jan 1, 2025		
The Legend of Heroes: Trails Beyond the Horizon	Role-playing	Nihon Falcom	NIS America	Sep 26, 2024	Jan 15, 2026	Jan 15, 2026		
The Legend of Heroes: Trails into Reverie	Role-playing	Nihon Falcom	NIS America	Aug 21, 2025	Jul 7, 2023	Jul 7, 2023		
The Legend of Heroes: Trails Through Daybreak	Role-playing	Nihon Falcom	NIS America	Jul 28, 2022	Jul 5, 2024	Jul 5, 2024		
The Legend of Heroes: Trails Through Daybreak II	Role-playing	Nihon Falcom	NIS America	Sep 29, 2022	Feb 14, 2025	Feb 14, 2025		
The Legend of Heroes: Trails of Cold Steel III	Role-playing	Nihon Falcom	NIS America	Aug 21, 2025	Feb 16, 2024	Feb 16, 2024		
The Legend of Heroes: Trails of Cold Steel IV	Role-playing	Nihon Falcom	NIS America	Aug 21, 2025	Feb 16, 2024	Feb 16, 2024		
Lego Batman: Legacy of the Dark Knight	Action-adventure	Traveller's Tales	Warner Bros. Games	May 29, 2026	May 29, 2026	May 29, 2026		
Lego Brawls	Fighting	Red Games Co.	Lego Games	Sep 2, 2022	Sep 2, 2022	Sep 2, 2022		
Lego Builder's Journey	Puzzle	Light Brick Studio	Lego Games	Apr 19, 2022	Apr 19, 2022	Apr 19, 2022		
Lego Horizon Adventures	Action-adventure	Guerrilla Games	Sony Interactive Entertainment	Nov 14, 2024	Nov 14, 2024	Nov 14, 2024		
Lego Party	Party	SMG Studio	Fictions	Sep 30, 2025	Sep 30, 2025	Sep 30, 2025		
Lego Star Wars: The Skywalker Saga	Action-adventure	Traveller's Tales	WB Games	Apr 5, 2022	Apr 5, 2022	Apr 5, 2022		
Lego Voyagers	Puzzle-platformer	Light Brick Studio	Annapurna Interactive	Sep 15, 2025	Sep 15, 2025	Sep 15, 2025		
Lemnis Gate	First-person shooter	Ratloop Games Canada	Frontier Foundry	Sep 28, 2021	Sep 28, 2021	Sep 28, 2021		
Let's School	Simulation	Pathea Games	Pathea Games; PM studios	Jul 16, 2024	Jul 16, 2024	Jul 16, 2024		
Lies of P	Soulslike; action role-playing	Round 8 Studio	Neowiz	Sep 19, 2023	Sep 19, 2023	Sep 19, 2023	P	
Life Is Strange: Double Exposure	Graphic adventure	Deck Nine	Square Enix	Oct 29, 2024	Oct 29, 2024	Oct 29, 2024		
Life Is Strange Remastered Collection	Graphic adventure	Don't Nod; Deck Nine	Square Enix	Unreleased	Feb 1, 2022	Feb 1, 2022		
Life Is Strange: Reunion	Graphic adventure	Deck Nine	Square Enix	Mar 26, 2026	Mar 26, 2026	Mar 26, 2026		
Life Is Strange: True Colors	Graphic adventure	Deck Nine	Square Enix	Sep 10, 2021	Sep 10, 2021	Sep 10, 2021		
Like a Dragon: Infinite Wealth	Role-playing	Ryu Ga Gotoku Studio	Sega	Jan 26, 2024	Jan 26, 2024	Jan 26, 2024		
Like a Dragon Gaiden: The Man Who Erased His Name	Action-adventure	Ryu Ga Gotoku Studio	Sega	Nov 9, 2023	Nov 9, 2023	Nov 9, 2023		
Like a Dragon: Ishin!	Action-adventure	Ryu Ga Gotoku Studio	Sega	Feb 22, 2023	Feb 21, 2023	Feb 21, 2023		
Like a Dragon: Pirate Yakuza in Hawaii	Action-adventure; beat 'em up	Ryu Ga Gotoku Studio	Sega	Feb 21, 2025	Feb 21, 2025	Feb 21, 2025	P	
Lil' Guardsman	Puzzle	Hilltop Studios	Versus Evil; tinyBuild Inc.	Unreleased	Jan 23, 2024	Jan 23, 2024		
Lilliput Hero: Miniature World	Adventure; Casual	SOFTWARE TECHNOLOGIES SRL	SOFTWARE TECHNOLOGIES SRL	May 12, 2025	May 12, 2025	May 12, 2025		
Little Big Adventure: Twinsen's Quest	Adventure	[2.21]	Microids	Nov 14, 2024	Nov 14, 2024	Nov 14, 2024		
Lineage W	Massively multiplayer online role-playing	NCSoft	NCsoft	TBA	TBA	TBA	CP	
Lisa: Definitive Edition	Role-playing	Dingaling Productions	Serenity Forge	Unreleased	Jul 18, 2023	Jul 18, 2023		
Little Devil Inside	Action-adventure	Neostream Interactive	Neostream Interactive	TBA	TBA	TBA		
Little Nightmares Enhanced Edition	Puzzle-platformer; survival horror	Tarsier Studios; Engine Software	Bandai Namco Entertainment	Oct 10, 2025	Oct 10, 2025	Oct 10, 2025		
Little Nightmares II	Puzzle-platformer; survival horror	Tarsier Studios	Bandai Namco Entertainment	Aug 25, 2021	Aug 25, 2021	Aug 25, 2021	CB	
Little Nightmares III	Puzzle-platformer; survival horror	Supermassive Games	Bandai Namco Entertainment	Oct 10, 2025	Oct 10, 2025	Oct 10, 2025		
Living with Horses: My Horse Farm	Simulation	Markt+Technik	Markt+Technik	Mar 23, 2023	Mar 23, 2023	Mar 23, 2023		
Long Gone Days	Role-playing	BURA	Pablo Videla	Jan 15, 2025	Oct 10, 2023	Oct 10, 2023		
The Lord of the Rings: Gollum	Action-adventure	Daedalic Entertainment	Daedalic Entertainment	May 25, 2023	May 25, 2023	May 25, 2023		
Lords of the Fallen Remake	Action role-playing	Hexworks	CI Games	Oct 13, 2023	Oct 13, 2023	Oct 13, 2023		
Lost in Random	Action-adventure	Zoink	Electronic Arts	Sep 10, 2021	Sep 10, 2021	Sep 10, 2021		
Lost Judgment	Action-adventure	Ryu Ga Gotoku Studio	Sega	Sep 24, 2021	Sep 24, 2021	Sep 24, 2021	CB	
Lost Records: Bloom & Rage	Adventure	Don't Nod Montréal	Don't Nod	Feb 18, 2025	Feb 18, 2025	Feb 18, 2025		
Lost Soul Aside	Action	Ultizero Games	Sony Interactive Entertainment	Aug 29, 2025	Aug 29, 2025	Aug 29, 2025		
Loulan	Action-adventure	ChillyRoom	Chillyroom	TBA	TBA	TBA		
Lumines Arise	Puzzle	Enhance Games; Monstars Inc.	Enhance Games	Nov 11, 2025	Nov 11, 2025	Nov 11, 2025		
Madden NFL 21	Sports	EA Tiburon	Electronic Arts	Dec 4, 2020	Dec 4, 2020	Dec 4, 2020	CB	
Madden NFL 22	Sports	EA Tiburon	Electronic Arts	Aug 20, 2021	Aug 20, 2021	Aug 20, 2021		
Madden NFL 23	Sports	EA Tiburon	Electronic Arts	Aug 19, 2022	Aug 19, 2022	Aug 19, 2022		
Madden NFL 24	Sports	EA Tiburon	EA Sports	Aug 18, 2023	Aug 18, 2023	Aug 18, 2023		
Madden NFL 25	Sports	EA Tiburon	EA Sports	Aug 16, 2024	Aug 16, 2024	Aug 16, 2024	P	
Madden NFL 26	Sports	EA Tiburon	EA Sports	Aug 14, 2025	Aug 14, 2025	Aug 14, 2025	P	
Madō Monogatari: Fia and the Mysterious School	Dungeon crawl; Role-playing	Sting Entertainment; D4 Enterprise	Compile Heart	Nov 28, 2024	Unreleased	Unreleased		
MADiSON	Psychological horror	Bloodious Games	Bloodious Games; Perpetual Games	Jul 4, 2024	Jul 8, 2022	Jul 8, 2022		
Mafia: The Old Country	Action-adventure	Hangar 13	2K	Aug 8, 2025	Aug 8, 2025	Aug 8, 2025		
Magic Dungeon Hero: Freedom or Death	Role-playing; Casual	GameToTop Corporation	GameToTop Corporation	Dec 25, 2024	Dec 25, 2024	Dec 25, 2024		
Maid of Sker	Survival horror	Wales Interactive	Wales Interactive	Unreleased	May 26, 2021	May 26, 2021		
The Making of Karateka	Action	Digital Eclipse	Digital Eclipse	Aug 29, 2023	Aug 29, 2023	Aug 29, 2023		
Maneater	Action role-playing	Tripwire Interactive; Blindside Interactive	Tripwire Interactive	Dec 16, 2020	Nov 12, 2020	Nov 19, 2020	CB	
Manifold Garden	Puzzle	William Chyr Studio	William Chyr Studio	May 20, 2021	May 20, 2021	May 20, 2021	CB	
Maquette	Puzzle	Graceful Decay	Annapurna Interactive	Mar 2, 2021	Mar 2, 2021	Mar 2, 2021		
Martha Is Dead	Psychological horror	LKA	Wired Productions	Feb 24, 2022	Feb 24, 2022	Feb 24, 2022		
Marvel MaXimum Collection	Beat 'em up	Limited Run Games	Limited Run Games	Unreleased	Mar 27, 2026	Mar 27, 2026		
Match Quest: Numbers	Puzzle	CUDIT	CUDIT	May 28, 2025	May 28, 2025	May 28, 2025		
Matchpoint: Tennis Championships	Sports	Torus Games	Kalypso Media	Jun 6, 2022	Jun 6, 2022	Jun 6, 2022		
Maximum Football	Sports	Invictus Games	Modus Games	Jun 17, 2025	Jun 17, 2025	Jun 17, 2025		
Untitled Max Payne Remake	Third-person shooter	Remedy Entertainment	Rockstar Games	TBA	TBA	TBA		
MechWarrior 5: Clans	Vehicle simulation	Piranha Games	Piranha Games	Oct 16, 2024	Oct 16, 2024	Oct 16, 2024		
MechWarrior 5: Mercenaries	Vehicle simulation	Piranha Games	Piranha Games	Sep 23, 2021	Sep 23, 2021	Sep 23, 2021		
The Medium	Psychological horror	Bloober Team	Bloober Team	Unreleased	Sep 3, 2021	Sep 3, 2021		
Mega Man: Dual Override	Action; Platform	Capcom	Capcom	2027	2027	2027		
Mega Man Star Force Legacy Collection	Role-playing; turn-based	Capcom	Capcom	Mar 27, 2026	Mar 27, 2026	Mar 27, 2026		
Megaton	Action; horror	EpiXR Games UG	EpiXR Games UG	Oct 31, 2024	Oct 31, 2024	Oct 31, 2024		
Megaton Musashi	Action role-playing	Level-5	Level-5	Nov 11, 2021	Apr 25, 2024	Apr 25, 2024		
A Memoir Blue	Interactive drama	Cloisters Interactive	Annapurna Interactive	Mar 24, 2022	Mar 24, 2022	Mar 24, 2022		
Metal: Hellsinger	First-person shooter; rhythm	The Outriders	Funcom	Sep 15, 2022	Sep 15, 2022	Sep 15, 2022		
Metal Gear Solid Delta: Snake Eater	Action-adventure; stealth	Konami	Konami	Aug 28, 2025	Aug 28, 2025	Aug 28, 2025	P	
Metal Gear Solid Master Collection Vol. 1	Action-adventure; stealth	Konami	Konami	Oct 24, 2023	Oct 24, 2023	Oct 24, 2023		
Metal Gear Solid Master Collection Vol. 2	Action-adventure; stealth	Konami	Konami	Aug 27, 2026	Aug 27, 2026	Aug 27, 2026		
Metaphor: ReFantazio	Role-playing	Studio Zero	Sega	Oct 11, 2024	Oct 11, 2024	Oct 11, 2024		
Metro Exodus Complete Edition	First-person shooter; survival horror	4A Games	Deep Silver	Jun 18, 2021	Jun 18, 2021	Jun 18, 2021	CB	
Mewgenics	Tactical role-playing; Roguelike; Life simulation	Edmund McMillen, Tyler Glaiel	Nicalis	Sep 8, 2026	Sep 8, 2026	Sep 8, 2026		
Miasma Chronicles	Tactical role-playing	The Bearded Ladies	505 Games	May 23, 2023	May 23, 2023	May 23, 2023		
MicroMan	Action-adventure; survival	Glob Games Studios	Glob Games Studios	TBA	TBA	TBA		
Microsoft Flight Simulator 2024	Flight simulation	Asobo Studio	Xbox Game Studios	Dec 8, 2025	Dec 8, 2025	Dec 8, 2025		
Marvel's Midnight Suns	Tactical role-playing	Firaxis Games	2K	Dec 2, 2022	Dec 2, 2022	Dec 2, 2022		
Minecraft: Bedrock Edition	Sandbox; Survival	Mojang	Sony Interactive Entertainment	Oct 22, 2024	Oct 22, 2024	Oct 22, 2024		
MindsEye	Action-adventure	Build a Rocket Boy	IO Interactive	Jun 10, 2025	Jun 10, 2025	Jun 10, 2025	P	
MIO: Memories in Orbit	Metroidvania	Douze Dixièmes	Focus Entertainment	Jan 20, 2026	Jan 20, 2026	Jan 20, 2026		
MLB The Show 21	Sports	San Diego Studio	Sony Interactive Entertainment	Apr 20, 2021	Apr 20, 2021	Apr 20, 2021	CP	
MLB The Show 22	Sports	San Diego Studio	Sony Interactive Entertainment	Apr 5, 2022	Apr 5, 2022	Apr 5, 2022	CP	
MLB The Show 23	Sports	San Diego Studio	Sony Interactive Entertainment	Mar 28, 2023	Mar 28, 2023	Mar 28, 2023	CP	
MLB The Show 24	Sports	San Diego Studio	Sony Interactive Entertainment	Mar 19, 2024	Mar 19, 2024	Mar 19, 2024	CP	
MLB The Show 25	Sports	San Diego Studio	Sony Interactive Entertainment	Mar 18, 2025	Mar 18, 2025	Mar 18, 2025		
Mobile Suit Gundam: Battle Operation 2	Third-person shooter	Bandai Namco Studios	Bandai Namco Entertainment	Jan 28, 2021	Jan 28, 2021	Jan 28, 2021		
Mobile Suit Gundam: Battle Operation Code Fairy Volume 1	Action	Bandai Namco Studios	Bandai Namco Entertainment	Nov 5, 2021	Nov 5, 2021	Nov 5, 2021		
Mobile Suit Gundam: Battle Operation Code Fairy Volume 2	Action	Bandai Namco Studios	Bandai Namco Entertainment	Nov 19, 2021	Nov 19, 2021	Nov 19, 2021		
Mobile Suit Gundam: Battle Operation Code Fairy Volume 3	Action	Bandai Namco Studios	Bandai Namco Entertainment	Dec 3, 2021	Dec 3, 2021	Dec 3, 2021		
Mon-Yu	Dungeon crawler	Experience, Inc.	NA: Aksys Games; EU: Numskull Games	Unreleased	Sep 21, 2023	Sep 29, 2023		
Monark	Role-playing	Lancarse	JP: FuRyu; WW: NIS America	Oct 14, 2021	Feb 22, 2022	Feb 25, 2022		
Monopoly Madness	Board game	Engine Software	Ubisoft	Dec 9, 2021	Dec 9, 2021	Dec 9, 2021		
Monster Boy and the Cursed Kingdom	Platform	Game Atelier	FDG Entertainment	Dec 2, 2021	Dec 2, 2021	Dec 2, 2021	CB	
Monster Energy Supercross: The Official Videogame 4	Racing	Milestone	Milestone	Mar 11, 2021	Mar 11, 2021	Mar 11, 2021		
Monster Energy Supercross: The Official Videogame 5	Racing	Milestone	Milestone	Jul 1, 2022	Mar 17, 2022	Mar 17, 2022		
Monster Energy Supercross: The Official Videogame 6	Racing	Milestone	Milestone	Mar 9, 2023	Mar 9, 2023	Mar 9, 2023		
Monster Hunter Rise	Action role-playing	Capcom	Capcom	Jan 20, 2023	Jan 20, 2023	Jan 20, 2023		
Monster Hunter Stories 3: Twisted Reflection	Action role-playing	Capcom	Capcom	2026	2026	2026		
Monster Hunter Wilds	Action role-playing	Capcom	Capcom	Feb 28, 2025	Feb 28, 2025	Feb 28, 2025		
Monster Survivors	Action	Two Llamas s.r.o.	Two Llamas s.r.o.	Apr 15, 2025	Apr 15, 2025	Apr 15, 2025		
Monster Truck Championship	Racing	Maximum Games	Maximum Games	Unreleased	Mar 16, 2021	Mar 11, 2021		
Mortal Kombat 1	Fighting	NetherRealm Studios	WB Games	Unreleased	Sep 19, 2023	Sep 19, 2023		
Mortal Kombat 11	Fighting	NetherRealm Studios	WB Games	Unreleased	Nov 17, 2020	Nov 19, 2020	CB CP	
Mortal Kombat: Legacy Kollection	Fighting	Digital Eclipse	Digital Eclipse; Atari	Sep 30, 2025	Sep 30, 2025	Sep 30, 2025		
Mortal Shell: Enhanced Edition	Action role-playing	Cold Symmetry	Playstack	May 20, 2021	Mar 4, 2021	Mar 4, 2021		
MOTIONREC	Puzzle	HANDSUM	Playism	April 2, 2026	April 2, 2026	April 2, 2026		
MotoGP 21	Racing	Milestone	Milestone	May 12, 2021	Apr 22, 2021	Apr 22, 2021		
Mouse: P.I. For Hire	First-person shooter	Fumi Games	PlaySide Studios	Apr 16, 2026	Apr 16, 2026	Apr 16, 2026		
Mr. Driller Drill Land	Puzzle	Bandai Namco Entertainment	Bandai Namco Entertainment	Nov 4, 2021	Nov 4, 2021	Nov 4, 2021		
Mr. Supershot	Arcade	Ocean Media	Ocean Media	Oct 30, 2023	Oct 30, 2023	Oct 30, 2023		
MultiVersus	Fighting	Player First Games	WB Games	Unreleased	Jul 26, 2022	Jul 26, 2022	CP	
Mundaun	Adventure; horror	Hidden Fields	MVM Interactive	Mar 16, 2021	Mar 16, 2021	Mar 16, 2021		
MXGP 2020	Racing	Milestone	Milestone	Jan 14, 2021	Jan 14, 2021	Jan 14, 2021		
MX vs. ATV Legends	Racing	Rainbow Studios	THQ Nordic	Jun 28, 2022	Jun 28, 2022	Jun 28, 2022		
My Time at Sandrock	Role-playing; simulation	Pathea Games	Pathea Games	Nov 2, 2023	Nov 2, 2023	Nov 2, 2023		
Naruto x Boruto: Ultimate Ninja Storm Connections	Fighting	CyberConnect2	Bandai Namco Entertainment	Nov 17, 2023	Nov 17, 2023	Nov 17, 2023		
NBA 2K21	Sports	Visual Concepts	2K Sports	Nov 12, 2020	Nov 12, 2020	Nov 19, 2020		
NBA 2K22	Sports	Visual Concepts	2K Sports	Sep 10, 2021	Sep 10, 2021	Sep 10, 2021		
NBA 2K23	Sports	Visual Concepts	2K Sports	Sep 9, 2022	Sep 9, 2022	Sep 9, 2022		
NBA 2K24	Sports	Visual Concepts	2K Sports	Sep 8, 2023	Sep 8, 2023	Sep 8, 2023		
NBA 2K25	Sports	Visual Concepts	2K Sports	Sep 6, 2024	Sep 6, 2024	Sep 6, 2024		
NBA 2K26	Sports	Visual Concepts	2K Sports	Sep 5, 2025	Sep 5, 2025	Sep 5, 2025		
Need for Speed Unbound	Racing	Criterion Games	Electronic Arts	Dec 2, 2022	Dec 2, 2022	Dec 2, 2022	CB	
Necromunda: Hired Gun	First-person shooter	Streum On Studio	Focus Home Interactive	Jun 1, 2021	Jun 1, 2021	Jun 1, 2021		
Needy Streamer Overload	Visual novel; Denpa; Management simulation	Xemono; WSS Playground	WSS Playground; Alliance Arts Inc.	Jan 20, 2025	Jan 20, 2025	Jan 20, 2025		
Neptunia Game Maker R:Evolution	Role-playing	Compile Heart	Idea Factory	Aug 10, 2023	May 14, 2024	May 14, 2024		
Neptunia Riders VS Dogoos	Racing	Compile Heart	Compile Heart	Jun 27, 2024	Jan 28, 2025	Jan 28, 2025		
Neptunia re★Verse	Role-playing	Compile Heart	Compile Heart	Dec 17, 2020	Jun 8, 2021	Jun 11, 2021		
Neptunia Shooter	Shoot 'em up	Idea Factory International	Idea Factory	Dec 17, 2020	Jun 8, 2021	Jun 11, 2021		
Neptunia: Sisters vs Sisters	Role-playing	Compile Heart	Idea Factory	Apr 21, 2022	Jan 24, 2023	Jan 24, 2023		
Neon Bash	Brain Training; Arcade	Aristo Studio	Aristo Studio	May 24, 2024	May 24, 2024	May 24, 2024		
Nerf Legends	First-person shooter	Fun Labs	NA: GameMill Entertainment; EU: Maximum Games; FRA: Just For Games	Unreleased	Nov 19, 2021	Nov 19, 2021		
Neverness to Everness	Action role-playing	Hotta Studio	Perfect World Games	Apr 29, 2026	Apr 29, 2026	Apr 29, 2026		
Nexomon	Role-playing	Vewo Interactive	PQube	Sep 17, 2021	Sep 17, 2021	Sep 17, 2021		
NHL 22	Sports	EA Vancouver	Electronic Arts	Oct 15, 2021	Oct 15, 2021	Oct 15, 2021		
NHL 23	Sports	EA Vancouver	Electronic Arts	Oct 14, 2022	Oct 14, 2022	Oct 14, 2022		
NHL 24	Sports	EA Vancouver	Electronic Arts	Oct 13, 2023	Oct 13, 2023	Oct 13, 2023		
NHL 25	Sports	EA Vancouver	Electronic Arts	Oct 4, 2024	Oct 4, 2024	Oct 4, 2024		
NHL 26	Sports	EA Vancouver	Electronic Arts	Sep 12, 2025	Sep 12, 2025	Sep 12, 2025		
Nickelodeon All-Star Brawl	Fighting	Fair Play Labs; Ludosity	NA: GameMill Entertainment; EU: Maximum Games; FRA: Just For Games	Nov 24, 2022	Oct 5, 2021	Oct 5, 2021		
Nickelodeon All-Star Brawl 2	Fighting	Fair Play Labs	NA: GameMill Entertainment; EU: Maximum Games	Unreleased	Nov 7, 2023	Nov 7, 2023		
Nickelodeon Kart Racers 3: Slime Speedway	Kart racing	Bamtang Games	NA: GameMill Entertainment; EU: Maximum Games	Unreleased	Oct 7, 2022	Oct 7, 2022		
Nikoderiko: The Magical World	3D platformer; Action-adventure	Vea Games	Knights Peak	Oct 15, 2024	Oct 15, 2024	Oct 15, 2024		
Ninja Gaiden II Black	Action-adventure; Hack and Slash	Team Ninja	Koei Tecmo	Jan 23, 2025	Jan 23, 2025	Jan 23, 2025	P	
Ninja Gaiden 4	Action-adventure; Hack and slash	Team Ninja; Koei Tecmo; PlatinumGames	Xbox Game Studios	Oct 21, 2025	Oct 21, 2025	Oct 21, 2025		
Nioh 3	Action role-playing	Team Ninja	Koei Tecmo	Feb 6, 2026	Feb 6, 2026	Feb 6, 2026		
The Nioh Collection	Action role-playing; hack and slash	Team Ninja	Sony Interactive Entertainment; Koei Tecmo	Feb 5, 2021	Feb 5, 2021	Feb 5, 2021		
Nobody Saves the World	Action role-playing	Drinkbox Studios	Drinkbox Studios	Apr 14, 2022	Apr 14, 2022	Apr 14, 2022		
No Man's Sky	Action-adventure; survival	Hello Games	Hello Games	Nov 12, 2020	Nov 12, 2020	Nov 19, 2020	CB CP P	
No More Heroes III	Action-adventure	Grasshopper Manufacture	Marvelous	Oct 10, 2022	Oct 10, 2022	Oct 10, 2022		
No Sleep for Kaname Date – From AI: The Somnium Files	Adventure; Visual novel; Escape room	Spike Chunsoft	Spike Chunsoft	Feb 26, 2026	Feb 26, 2026	Feb 26, 2026		
Nour: Play with Your Food	Exploration	Terrifying Jellyfish	Panic	Sep 12, 2023	Sep 12, 2023	Sep 12, 2023		
Observer: System Redux	Psychological horror	Bloober Team	Aspyr	Nov 12, 2020	Nov 12, 2020	Nov 19, 2020		
Octopath Traveler 0	Role-playing	Square Enix; Dokidoki Grooveworks	Square Enix	Dec 4, 2025	Dec 4, 2025	Dec 4, 2025		
Octopath Traveler II	Role-playing	Acquire; Square Enix	Square Enix	Feb 24, 2023	Feb 24, 2023	Feb 24, 2023		
Oddworld: Soulstorm	Platform	Oddworld Inhabitants	Oddworld Inhabitants	Apr 6, 2021	Apr 6, 2021	Apr 6, 2021		
OlliOlli World	Sports	Roll7	Private Division	Feb 8, 2022	Feb 8, 2022	Feb 8, 2022		
Olympic Games Quiz	Casual	Colosseum Studio	Colosseum Studio	May 14, 2025	May 14, 2025	May 14, 2025		
One Piece Odyssey	Role-playing	ILCA	Bandai Namco Entertainment	Jan 12, 2023	Jan 13, 2023	Jan 13, 2023		
Onimusha: Way of the Sword	Action-adventure	Capcom	Capcom	Sep 25, 2026	Sep 25, 2026	Sep 25, 2026		
Open Roads	Mystery-thriller	Fullbright	Annapurna Interactive	Mar 28, 2024	Mar 28, 2024	Mar 28, 2024		
Operation: Tango	Adventure	Clever Plays	Clever Plays	Jun 1, 2021	Jun 1, 2021	Jun 1, 2021		
Orcs Must Die! 3	Tower defense	Robot Entertainment	Robot Entertainment	Jul 23, 2021	Jul 23, 2021	Jul 23, 2021		
Outbreak	Horror	Dead Drop Studios	Dead Drop Studios	Unreleased	Jan 14, 2021	Jan 14, 2021		
Outbreak: Epidemic	Horror	Dead Drop Studios	Dead Drop Studios	Unreleased	Dec 24, 2020	Dec 24, 2020		
Outbreak: Lost Hope	Horror	Dead Drop Studios	Dead Drop Studios	Unreleased	Jan 7, 2021	Jan 7, 2021		
Outbreak: The New Nightmare	Horror	Dead Drop Studios	Dead Drop Studios	Unreleased	Dec 17, 2020	Dec 17, 2020		
Outbreak: The Nightmare Chronicles	Horror	Dead Drop Studios	Dead Drop Studios	Unreleased	Dec 31, 2020	Dec 31, 2020		
Outcast 2: A New Beginning	Action-adventure	Appeal	THQ Nordic	Feb 5, 2024	Feb 5, 2024	Feb 5, 2024		
The Outlast Trials	Survival horror	Red Barrels	Red Barrels	Unreleased	Mar 5, 2024	Mar 5, 2024		
Out of Words	Platform; Adventure	Kong Orange; WiredFly	Epic Games Publishing	2026	2026	2026		
Outriders	Third-person shooter	People Can Fly	Square Enix	Apr 1, 2021	Apr 1, 2021	Apr 1, 2021	CB CP	
Overcooked! All You Can Eat	Action; family	Ghost Town Games; Team17	Team17	Nov 12, 2020	Nov 12, 2020	Nov 19, 2020	CP	
Override 2: Super Mech League	Beat 'em up	Modus Studios Brazil	Modus Games	Dec 22, 2020	Dec 22, 2020	Dec 22, 2020	CB	
Overwatch 2	First-person shooter	Blizzard Entertainment	Blizzard Entertainment	Aug 10, 2023	Aug 10, 2023	Aug 10, 2023		
Oxenfree II: Lost Signals	Graphic adventure	Night School Studio	MWM Interactive	Jul 12, 2023	Jul 12, 2023	Jul 12, 2023		
Pac-Man Mega Tunnel Battle: Chomp Champs	Maze; battle royale	Amber Studio	Bandai Namco Entertainment	May 9, 2024	May 9, 2024	May 9, 2024		
Pac-Man World Re-Pac	Platform game; Casual game; Adventure	Now Production; BNE LLC; Namco Hometek Inc.	Namco Bandai Games; BNE LLC	Aug 26, 2022	Aug 26, 2022	Aug 26, 2022		
Paleo Pines	Role-playing game; Indie game; Life simulation game; Adventure game; Casual game	Italic Pig	Modus Games	Sep 26, 2023	Sep 26, 2023	Sep 26, 2023		
Palworld	Survival	Pocketpair	Pocketpair	Oct 4, 2024	Sep 24, 2024	Sep 24, 2024		
Panda Hero Remastered	Platform	Markt & Technik	Markt & Technik	Unreleased	Jan 22, 2021	Jan 23, 2021		
Paper Beast: Enhanced Edition	Adventure	Pixel Reef	Plug In Digital	Sep 27, 2023	Sep 27, 2023	Sep 27, 2023		
Paper Plane	Casual	Two Llamas s.r.o.	Two Llamas s.r.o.	Apr 27, 2025	Apr 27, 2025	Apr 27, 2025		
Paperman: Adventure Delivered	Action game; Indie game; Casual game	Secret Item Games	Mindscape	Sep 21, 2023	Sep 21, 2023	Sep 21, 2023		
Paranormal Watcher	Horror	Surprised Hotdog Limited	Surprised Hotdog Limited	Mar 4, 2025	Mar 4, 2025	Mar 4, 2025		
Park Beyond	Construction and management simulation	Limbic Entertainment	Bandai Namco Entertainment	Jun 16, 2023	Jun 16, 2023	Jun 16, 2023		
Party Animals	Brawler; Party	Recreate Games	Source Technology	Jan 23, 2025	Jan 23, 2025	Jan 23, 2025	P	
Party Crasher Simulator	Simulation	Glob Games Studio	Glob Games Studio	TBA	TBA	TBA		
The Pathless	Action-adventure	Giant Squid	Annapurna Interactive	Nov 12, 2020	Nov 12, 2020	Nov 19, 2020	CB	
Pathologic 3	Adventure	Ice-Pick Lodge	HypeTrain Digital	Jan 9, 2025	Jan 9, 2025	Jan 9, 2025		
Paw Patrol World	Action-Adventure	3DClouds	Outright Games	Sep 29, 2023	Sep 29, 2023	Sep 29, 2023		
Paws and Clean	Casual	Nextgo24 UG	Nextgo24 UG	Sep 13, 2024	Sep 13, 2024	Sep 13, 2024		
Payday 3	First-person shooter	Starbreeze Studios	Deep Silver	Sep 21, 2023	Sep 21, 2023	Sep 21, 2023		
The Pedestrian	Puzzle platformer	Skookum Arts	Skookum Arts	Jan 28, 2021	Jan 29, 2021	Jan 29, 2021		
Pentiment	Adventure; role-playing	Obsidian Entertainment	Xbox Game Studios	Feb 22, 2024	Feb 22, 2024	Feb 22, 2024		
The Persistence Enhanced	Action-adventure	Firesprite	Perp Games	Unreleased	Jun 4, 2021	Jun 4, 2021	CB	
Persona 3 Reload	Role-playing; social simulation	P-Studio	Sega	Feb 2, 2024	Feb 2, 2024	Feb 2, 2024		
Persona 5 Royal	Role-Playing	Atlus	Sega	Oct 21, 2022	Oct 21, 2022	Oct 21, 2022		
Persona 5 Tactica	Tactical Role-Playing	P-Studio	Sega	Nov 17, 2023	Nov 17, 2023	Nov 17, 2023		
PGA Tour 2K23	Sports	HB Studios	2K	Oct 14, 2022	Oct 14, 2022	Oct 14, 2022		
PGA Tour 2K25	Sports	HB Studios	2K	Feb 28, 2025	Feb 28, 2025	Feb 28, 2025		
Phantom Blade Zero	Action role-playing	S-GAME	S-GAME	Sep 9, 2026	Sep 9, 2026	Sep 9, 2026		
Phantom Brave: The Lost Hero	Tactical role-playing	Nippon Ichi Software	JP: Nippon Ichi Software; WW: NIS America	Jan 30, 2025	Jan 30, 2025	Jan 30, 2025		
Piece Out	Puzzle	CUDIT	CUDIT	Jan 12, 2025	Jan 12, 2025	Jan 12, 2025		
Piece Out: Avatarland	Puzzle	CUDIT	CUDIT	May 29, 2025	May 29, 2025	May 29, 2025		
Pig Escape	Casual	Colosseum Studio	Colosseum Studio	Mar 23, 2025	Mar 23, 2025	Mar 23, 2025		
Pinball FX	Simulation	Zen Studios	Zen Studios	Feb 16, 2023	Feb 16, 2023	Feb 16, 2023		
Pinball M	Simulation	Zen Studios	Zen Studios	Nov 30, 2023	Nov 30, 2023	Nov 30, 2023		
Ping Redux	Arcade	Nami Tentou	Nami Tentou	Unreleased	Feb 25, 2021	Unreleased		
Poiner	First-person shooter	GFAGames	GFAGames	TBA	TBA	TBA		
Planet Coaster: Console Edition	Construction and management simulation	Frontier Developments	Frontier Developments	Nov 12, 2020	Nov 12, 2020	Nov 19, 2020	CB	
Planet Coaster 2	Construction and management simulation	Frontier Developments	Frontier Developments	Nov 6, 2024	Nov 6, 2024	Nov 6, 2024	P	
Planet Zoo: Console Edition	Construction and management simulation	Frontier Developments	Frontier Developments	Mar 26, 2024	Mar 26, 2024	Mar 26, 2024		
Plumbers Don't Wear Ties	Visual novel	United Pixtures	Limited Run Games	Sep 22, 2023	Sep 22, 2023	Sep 22, 2023		
Poker Club	Card & board	Ripstone	Ripstone	Unreleased	Nov 20, 2020	Nov 20, 2020	CB CP	
Pool Hop	Casual	Colosseum Studio	Colosseum Studio	Apr 30, 2025	Apr 30, 2025	Apr 30, 2025		
Pool Pro 2022	Sports	Ocean Media	Ocean Media	Nov 6, 2023	Nov 6, 2023	Nov 6, 2023		
Poopy Time	Unique	Nostra Games LTD	Nostra Games LTD	Jun 19, 2024	Jun 19, 2024	Jun 19, 2024		
Port Royale 4	Real-time strategy	Gaming Minds Studios	Kalypso Media	Sep 10, 2021	Sep 10, 2021	Sep 10, 2021		
PowerWash Simulator 2	Simulation	FuturLab	FuturLab	Oct 23, 2025	Oct 23, 2025	Oct 23, 2025		
PPA Pickball Tour 2025	Sports	FarSight Studios	FarSight Technologies	Unreleased	Jul 16, 2024	Jul 16, 2024		
Praey for the Gods	Action-adventure; survival	No Matter Studios	No Matter Studios	Dec 14, 2021	Dec 14, 2021	Dec 14, 2021	CB	
Pragmata	Action-adventure	Capcom	Capcom	Apr 17, 2026	Apr 17, 2026	Apr 17, 2026		
Predator: Hunting Grounds	First-person shooter; Third-person shooter	IllFonic	IllFonic	Oct 1, 2024	Oct 1, 2024	Oct 1, 2024		
Predecessor	Multiplayer online battle arena	Omeda Studios	Omeda Studios	Unreleased	Aug 20, 2024	Aug 20, 2024		
Prison Architect 2	Construction and management simulation	Double Eleven; Kokku	Paradox Interactive	TBA	TBA	TBA		
Professional Baseball Spirits 2024-2025	Sports	Konami	Pawapuro Production	Oct 16, 2024	Unreleased	Unreleased	P	
Professor Layton and the New World of Steam	Puzzle; Adventure	Level-5	Level-5	2026	2026	2026		
Psikyo Shooting Collection	Arcade; shoot 'em up	Zerodiv	City Connection	TBA	TBA	TBA		
Pumpkin Jack	Action-adventure game	Nicolas Meyssonnier	Headup Games	Oct 27, 2021	Oct 27, 2021	Oct 27, 2021		
Puyo Puyo Tetris 2	Puzzle	Sonic Team	Sega	Dec 10, 2020	Dec 8, 2020	Dec 8, 2020	CB	
Puzzle Bobble 3D: Vacation Odyssey	Puzzle	ININ Games	Taito Corporation	Oct 7, 2021	Oct 5, 2021	Oct 5, 2021		
Puzzle Vacations: France	Puzzle	Ocean Media	Ocean Media	Sep 1, 2024	Sep 1, 2024	Sep 1, 2024		
Puzzle Vacations: Japan	Puzzle	OCEAN MEDIA LLC	OCEAN MEDIA LLC	Unreleased	Nov 4, 2023	Nov 4, 2023		
Puzzle Vacations: Nordics	Puzzle	OCEAN MEDIA LLC	OCEAN MEDIA LLC	Sep 1, 2024	Sep 1, 2024	Sep 1, 2024		
Quake	First-person shooter	id Software; Nightdive Studios	Bethesda Softworks	Oct 12, 2021	Oct 12, 2021	Oct 12, 2021	CB	
Quantum Error	First-person shooter	TeamKill Media	TeamKill Media	Nov 3, 2023	Nov 3, 2023	Nov 3, 2023		
Quisisana	Horror	Domynyo S.r.l.	Domynyo S.r.l.	May 23, 2025	May 23, 2025	May 23, 2025		
R-Type Final 3 Evolved	Shoot 'em up	Granzella	JP: Granzella; WW: NIS America	Mar 23, 2023	Apr 25, 2023	Apr 28, 2023		
Raidou Remastered: The Mystery of the Soulless Army	Action role-playing	Atlus	Atlus	Jun 19, 2025	Jun 19, 2025	Jun 19, 2025		
Rally Racing	Driving; Racing	Interactive Dreams Limited	Interactive Dreams Limited	Unreleased	Aug 23, 2021	Aug 23, 2021		
Ratchet & Clank: Rift Apart	Action-adventure; platform	Insomniac Games	Sony Interactive Entertainment	Jun 11, 2021	Jun 11, 2021	Jun 11, 2021	P	
Rage of the Dragons	Fighting	Noise Factory	Piko Interactive	TBA	TBA	TBA		
Read Only Memories: Neurodiver	Adventure	MidBoss	MidBoss	May 16, 2024	May 16, 2024	May 16, 2024		
Record of Lodoss War: Deedlit in Wonder Labyrinth	Metroidvania	Team Ladybug; Why So Serious?	Playism	Dec 16, 2021	Dec 16, 2021	Dec 16, 2021		
Recompile	Platformer	Phigames	Phigames	Aug 19, 2021	Aug 19, 2021	Aug 19, 2021		
Red Dead Redemption	Action-adventure	Rockstar San Diego; Double Eleven; Cast Iron Games	Rockstar Games	Dec 2, 2025	Dec 2, 2025	Dec 2, 2025		
Redout 2	Racing	Saber Interactive	34BigThings	Jun 16, 2022	Jun 16, 2022	Jun 16, 2022		
Relayer	Tactical role-playing	Kadokawa Games	JP: Kadokawa Games; WW: Clouded Leopard Entertainment	Mar 24, 2022	Mar 24, 2022	Mar 24, 2022	CB	
Remnant 2	Third-person shooter; Action role-playing	Gunfire Games	Gearbox Publishing San Francisco	Jul 25, 2023	Jul 25, 2023	Jul 25, 2023		
Renzo Racer	Arcade; racing	EnsenaSoft	Joindots	Unreleased	Jan 25, 2021	Jan 25, 2021		
Resident Evil 2	Survival horror	Capcom	Capcom	Jun 14, 2022	Jun 13, 2022	Jun 14, 2022	CB	
Resident Evil 3	Survival horror	Capcom	Capcom	Jun 14, 2022	Jun 13, 2022	Jun 14, 2022	CB	
Resident Evil 4	Survival horror	Capcom	Capcom	Mar 24, 2023	Mar 24, 2023	Mar 24, 2023	P	
Resident Evil 7: Biohazard	Survival horror	Capcom	Capcom	Jun 14, 2022	Jun 13, 2022	Jun 14, 2022	CB	
Resident Evil Requiem	Survival horror	Capcom	Capcom	Feb 27, 2026	Feb 27, 2026	Feb 27, 2026		
Resident Evil Village	Survival horror	Capcom	Capcom	May 7, 2021	May 7, 2021	May 7, 2021	CB P	
Return to Monkey Island	Graphic adventure	Terrible Toybox	Devolver Digital	Nov 8, 2022	Nov 8, 2022	Nov 8, 2022		
Returnal	Third-person shooter	Housemarque	Sony Interactive Entertainment	Apr 30, 2021	Apr 30, 2021	Apr 30, 2021		
RetroRealms: Ash vs Evil Dead	Survival Horror; Arcade	Boss Team Games	Boss Team Games	Oct 18, 2024	Oct 18, 2024	Oct 18, 2024		
RetroRealms: Halloween	Survival Horror; Acade	Boss Team Games	Boss Team Games	Oct 18, 2024	Oct 18, 2024	Oct 18, 2024		
RetroRealms: Laurie Strode	Survival Horror; Acade	Boss Team Games	Boss Team Games	Oct 18, 2024	Oct 18, 2024	Oct 18, 2024		
RetroRealms: Kelly Maxwell	Survival Horror; Acade	Boss Team Games	Boss Team Games	Oct 18, 2024	Oct 18, 2024	Oct 18, 2024		
Revita	Platformer	BenStar	Dear Villagers	Unreleased	Apr 20, 2023	Apr 20, 2023		
The Reward of Cherishment and Eternity	Third-person shooter	Fears Ahead Studios	Fears Ahead Studios	Jan 21, 2025	Jan 21, 2025	Jan 21, 2025		
Rex 'n Run	Arcade	4 GLADIATORS	4 GLADIATORS	Apr 28, 2025	Apr 28, 2025	Apr 28, 2025		
Reynatis	Action role-playing	Natsume Atari; FuRyu	JP: FuRyu; WW: NIS America	Jul 25, 2024	Sep 27, 2024	Sep 27, 2024		
Ride 4	Racing	Milestone	Milestone	Jan 21, 2021	Jan 21, 2021	Jan 21, 2021	CB	
Ride 5	Racing	Milestone	Milestone	Aug 24, 2023	Aug 24, 2023	Aug 24, 2023		
Ride 6	Racing	Milestone	Milestone	Feb 12, 2026	Feb 12, 2026	Feb 12, 2026		
Riders Republic	Racing	Ubisoft Annecy	Ubisoft	Oct 28, 2021	Oct 28, 2021	Oct 28, 2021	CB	
The Riftbreaker	Action-adventure	EXOR Studios	EXOR Studios	Oct 13, 2021	Oct 14, 2021	Oct 14, 2021		
RiMS Racing	Racing	RaceWard Studio	Nacon	Aug 19, 2021	Aug 19, 2021	Aug 19, 2021		
Rise of the Ronin	Action role-playing	Team Ninja	Sony Interactive Entertainment	Mar 22, 2024	Mar 22, 2024	Mar 22, 2024	P	
Rise of the Slime	Adventure; roguelike	Bunkovsky Games	Playstack	Unreleased	May 28, 2021	May 28, 2021		
River City Girls	Beat 'em up	WayForward	Arc System Works	Jan 18, 2022	Jan 18, 2022	Jan 18, 2022		
River City Girls 2	Beat 'em up	WayForward	Arc System Works	Dec 1, 2022	Dec 15, 2022	Dec 15, 2022		
RoboCop: Rogue City	First-person shooter	Teyon	Nacon	Nov 2, 2023	Nov 2, 2023	Nov 2, 2023		
Roguebook	Roguelike deck-building game	Abrakam Entertainment	Nacon	Feb 24, 2022	Feb 24, 2022	Feb 24, 2022		
Rogue Company	Third-person shooter	First Watch Games	Hi-Rez Studios	Mar 30, 2021	Mar 30, 2021	Mar 30, 2021		
RollerCoaster Tycoon 3: Complete Edition	Construction and management simulation	Frontier Developments	Atari	Mar 20, 2025	Mar 20, 2025	Mar 20, 2025		
Rolling Ball	Puzzle	Colosseum Studio	Colosseum Studio	May 21, 2025	May 21, 2025	May 21, 2025		
Romancelvania: BATchelor's Curse	Metroidvania; base-building	Deep End Games	Deep End Games	Unreleased	Mar 7, 2023	Mar 7, 2023		
Romancing SaGa 2: Revenge of the Seven	Role-playing	Square Enix	Square Enix	Oct 24, 2024	Oct 24, 2024	Oct 24, 2024		
Roots of Pacha	Role-playing; farming simulation	Soda Den	Crytivo	Nov 28, 2023	Nov 28, 2023	Nov 28, 2023		
Rugby 22	Sports	Eko Software	Nacon	Jan 27, 2022	Jan 27, 2022	Jan 27, 2022		
Rugrats: Retro Rewind Collection	Party; Platformer	Limited Run Games	Limited Run Games	Unreleased	May 15, 2026	May 15, 2026		
Ruined King: A League of Legends Story	Role-playing	Airship Syndicate	Riot Forge	Nov 16, 2021	Nov 16, 2021	Nov 16, 2021		
Ruinverse	Role-playing	Exe Create	Kemco	Mar 31, 2021	Apr 1, 2021	Apr 1, 2021	CB	
The Rumble Fish 2	Fighting	Dimps	3goo	Dec 8, 2022	Dec 8, 2022	Dec 8, 2022		
Run Man	Arcade	4 GLADIATORS	4 GLADIATORS	May 28, 2023	May 28, 2023	May 28, 2023		
Rune Factory: Guardians of Azuma	Role-playing; Simulation	Marvelous	JP: Marvelous; NA: Marvelous USA; EU: Marvelous Europe	Feb 13, 2026	Feb 13, 2026	Feb 13, 2026		
Rusted Moss	Metroidvania	faxdoc, happysquared, sunnydaze	Playism	Jun 20, 2024	Jun 20, 2024	Jun 20, 2024		
RWBY: Arrowfell	Metroidvania	WayForward	Arc System Works	Nov 15, 2022	Nov 15, 2022	Nov 15, 2022		
S.T.A.L.K.E.R. 2: Heart of Chornobyl	First-person shooter; Survival Horror	GSC Game World	GSC Game World	Nov 20, 2025	Nov 20, 2025	Nov 20, 2025		
Sackboy: A Big Adventure	3D platformer	Sumo Digital	Sony Interactive Entertainment	Nov 12, 2020	Nov 12, 2020	Nov 19, 2020	CB CP	
Saints Row	Action-adventure	Volition	Deep Silver	Aug 23, 2022	Aug 23, 2022	Aug 23, 2022		
Saints Row: The Third Remastered	Action-adventure	Volition	Deep Silver	May 25, 2021	May 25, 2021	May 25, 2021	CB	
Salt and Sacrifice	Action role-playing; metroidvania	Ska Studios	Ska Studios	May 10, 2022	May 10, 2022	May 10, 2022		
Sakura Succubus	Adventure; Adult	Winged Cloud	Gamuzumi	Apr 4, 2021	Apr 4, 2021	Apr 4, 2021		
Sakura Succubus II	Adventure; Adult	Winged Cloud	Gamuzumi	May 19, 2021	May 19, 2021	May 19, 2021		
Sakura Succubus III	Adventure; Adult	Winged Cloud	Gamuzumi	Jun 23, 2021	Jun 23, 2021	Jun 23, 2021		
Sakura Succubus IV	Adventure; Adult	Winged Cloud	Gamuzumi	Aug 18, 2021	Aug 18, 2021	Aug 18, 2021		
Sakura Succubus V	Adventure; Adult	Winged Cloud	Gamuzumi	Apr 4, 2022	Apr 4, 2022	Apr 4, 2022		
Sakura Succubus VI	Adventure; Adult	Winged Cloud	Gamuzumi	Jul 11, 2022	Jul 11, 2022	Jul 11, 2022		
Sakura Succubus VII	Adventure; Adult	Winged Cloud	Gamuzumi	Feb 28, 2024	Feb 28, 2024	Feb 28, 2024		
Sand Land	Action role-playing	ILCA	Bandai Namco Entertainment	Apr 25, 2024	Apr 26, 2024	Apr 26, 2024		
Saros	Third-person shooter	Housemarque	Sony Interactive Entertainment	Apr 30, 2026	Apr 30, 2026	Apr 30, 2026		
Say a Prayer	Casual	Gold Creek VR	Gold Creek VR	May 30, 2024	May 30, 2024	May 30, 2024		
Sayonara Wild Hearts	Rhythm; Action	Simogo	Annapurna Interactive	Feb 24, 2025	Feb 24, 2025	Feb 24, 2025		
Scar-Lead Salvation	Third-person shooter	Compile Heart; Neilo	Compile Heart; Idea Factory International	May 29, 2025	May 29, 2025	May 29, 2025		
Scorn	Survival horror; Adventure	Ebb Software	Kepler Interactive	Unreleased	Oct 3, 2023	Oct 3, 2023		
Sea of Thieves	Action-adventure	Rare	Xbox Game Studios	Apr 30, 2024	Apr 30, 2024	Apr 30, 2024		
SEGA Football Club Champions	Sports	Sega	Sega	Jan 22, 2026	Jan 22, 2026	Jan 22, 2026		
SpellForce: Conquest of Eo	Strategy; Role-playing; Adventure	Owned by Gravity	THQ Nordic	Unreleased	Nov 7, 2023	Nov 7, 2023		
Samurai Gunn 2	Platform; fighter	YellowAfterlife	YellowAfterlife	TBA	TBA	TBA		
Scatch: The Painter Cat	Puzzle	Isaias Game Dev	Colossus Game Studio	Jan 8, 2024	Jan 8, 2024	Jan 8, 2024		
Schim	Platformer	Ewoud van der Werf; Nils Slijkerman	WW: Extra Nice; JP: Playism	Jul 18, 2024	Jul 18, 2024	Jul 18, 2024		
Scott Pilgrim vs. the World: The Game - Complete Edition	Beat 'em up	Ubisoft	Ubisoft	Jan 14, 2021	Jan 14, 2021	Jan 14, 2021		
Season: A Letter to the Future	Adventure	Scavengers studio	Scavengers studio	Jan 31, 2023	Jan 31, 2023	Jan 31, 2023		
Senua's Saga: Hellblade II	Action-adventure; Hack and slash	Ninja Theory	Xbox Game Studios	Aug 12, 2025	Aug 12, 2025	Aug 12, 2025		
Sephonie	Puzzle-platform	Analgesic Productions	Ratalaika Games	Jul 21, 2023	Jul 21, 2023	Jul 21, 2023		
Serial Cleaners	Stealth	Draw Distance	505 Games	Mar 29, 2023	Sep 22, 2022	Sep 22, 2022		
Serious Sam 4	First-person shooter	Croteam	Devolver Digital	Dec 7, 2021	Dec 7, 2021	Dec 7, 2021		
Seven Days Until Morning	Horror	Dishsoap Studios	Dishsoap Studios	Jun 7, 2026	Jun 7, 2026	Jun 7, 2026		
Shadow Warrior 3: Definitive Edition	First-person shooter	Flying Wild Hog	Devolver Digital	Feb 16, 2023	Feb 16, 2023	Feb 16, 2023		
Shakedown: Hawaii	Action-adventure	Vblank Entertainment	Vblank Entertainment	Dec 15, 2020	Dec 15, 2020	Dec 15, 2020	CB	
Shantae	Platform	WayForward	WayForward	Unreleased	Jun 2, 2023	Jun 2, 2023		
Shantae Advance: Risky Revolution	Platform	WayForward	WayForward	Unreleased	Aug 19, 2025	Aug 19, 2025		
Shattered – Tale of the Forgotten King	Action role-playing	Redlock Studio	Forthright Entertainment	Unreleased	Apr 22, 2022	Apr 22, 2022		
Sherlock Holmes: The Awakened	Adventure	Frogwares	Frogwares	Apr 11, 2023	Apr 11, 2023	Apr 11, 2023		
Sherlock Holmes: Chapter One	Adventure	Frogwares	Frogwares	Nov 16, 2021	Nov 16, 2021	Nov 16, 2021		
Shikhondo: Blue Pieta	Shoot 'em up	DeerFarm	CFK	May 18, 2026	May 18, 2026	May 18, 2026		
Shing!	Beat 'em up	Mass Creation	Mass Creation	Unreleased	Mar 18, 2021	Mar 18, 2021		
Showa American Story	Action role-playing	Nekcom	2P Games	TBA	TBA	TBA		
Shujinkou	Role-playing	Rice Games Inc	Rice Games Inc	Dec 30, 2025	Feb 13, 2025	Feb 13, 2025	P	
Side Bullet	Action; Shooter	PressA	PressA	Oct 4, 2023	Oct 4, 2023	Oct 4, 2023		
Sifu	Beat 'em up	Sloclap	Sloclap	Feb 8, 2022	Feb 8, 2022	Feb 8, 2022	CB	
Silent Hill 2	Survival horror	Bloober Team	Konami	Oct 8, 2024	Oct 8, 2024	Oct 8, 2024	P	
Silent Hill f	Survival horror	NeoBards Entertainment	Konami Digital Entertainment	Sep 25, 2025	Sep 25, 2025	Sep 25, 2025		
Silent Hill: The Short Message	Psychological horror	Konami Digital Entertainment	Konami	Jan 31, 2024	Jan 31, 2024	Jan 31, 2024		
Sinfeld Remastered	Action; horror	RareBird Games	RareBird Games	Unreleased	TBA	TBA		
The Sinking City	Action-adventure; Survival horror	Frogwares	Frogwares	Feb 19, 2021	Feb 19, 2021	Feb 19, 2021		
The Sinking City 2	Survival horror	Frogwares	Frogwares	2026	2026	2026		
Skate	Sports	Full Circle	EA	Sep 16, 2025	Sep 16, 2025	Sep 16, 2025		
Skull and Bones	Action-adventure	Ubisoft Singapore	Ubisoft	Feb 16, 2024	Feb 16, 2024	Feb 16, 2024		
Slave Zero X	Action	Poppy Works	Ziggurat Interactive, Inc.	Feb 18, 2024	Feb 18, 2024	Feb 18, 2024		
Slayers X: Terminal Aftermath: Vengance of the Slayer	First-person shooter	Big Z Studios Inc.	No More Robots	Unreleased	May 15, 2024	May 15, 2024		
Slitterhead	Survival horror; stealth	Bokeh Game Studio	Bokeh Game Studio	Nov 8, 2024	Nov 8, 2024	Nov 8, 2024	P	
Smelter	Action; strategy	X Plus	Dangen Entertainment	Sep 1, 2021	Sep 1, 2021	Sep 1, 2021		
Smalland: Survive the Wilds	Survival game	Merge Games	Merge Games	Dec 8, 2023	Dec 8, 2023	Dec 8, 2023		
The Smurfs: Dreams	Action-adventure	Ocellus Studio	Microïds	Oct 24, 2024	Oct 24, 2024	Oct 24, 2024		
The Smurfs: Mission Vileaf	Action-adventure	OSome Studio	Microids	Apr 14, 2022	Dec 14, 2021	Dec 2, 2021		
The Smurfs 2: The Prisoner of the Green Stone	Action-adventure	OSome Studio	Microids	Nov 2, 2023	Nov 2, 2023	Nov 2, 2023		
Sniper Elite 5	Tactical shooter; stealth	Rebellion Developments	Rebellion Developments	May 26, 2022	May 26, 2022	May 26, 2022		
Sniper Elite: Resistance	Tactical shooter	Rebellion Developments	Rebellion Developments	Jan 30, 2025	Jan 30, 2025	Jan 30, 2025		
Sniper Ghost Warrior Contracts 2	Tactical shooter; stealth	CI Games	CI Games	Unreleased	Aug 24, 2021	Aug 24, 2021		
Solar Ash	Action-adventure	Heart Machine	Annapurna Interactive	Dec 2, 2021	Dec 2, 2021	Dec 2, 2021		
South Park: Snow Day!	Action	Question Games	THQ Nordic	Mar 26, 2024	Mar 26, 2024	Mar 26, 2024		
Sonic Frontiers	Platform	Sonic Team	Sega	Nov 8, 2022	Nov 8, 2022	Nov 8, 2022		
Sonic Origins	Platform	Sonic Team	Sega	Jun 23, 2022	Jun 23, 2022	Jun 23, 2022		
Sonic Origins Plus	Platform	Sonic Team	Sega	Jun 23, 2023	Jun 23, 2023	Jun 23, 2023		
Sonic Racing: CrossWorlds	Kart racing	Sonic Team	Sega	Sep 25, 2025	Sep 25, 2025	Sep 25, 2025		
Sonic Superstars	Platform	Sonic Team	Sega	Oct 17, 2023	Oct 17, 2023	Oct 17, 2023		
Sonic X Shadow Generations	Platform	Sonic Team	Sega	Oct 25, 2024	Oct 25, 2024	Oct 25, 2024		
Soul Hackers 2	Role-playing	Atlus	Atlus	Aug 25, 2022	Aug 26, 2022	Aug 26, 2022		
Soulstice	Action role-playing	Reply Game Studios	Modus Games	Nov 23, 2022	Sep 20, 2022	Sep 20, 2022		
Spacelords	Action-adventure	MercurySteam	MercurySteam	Nov 12, 2020	Nov 12, 2020	Nov 19, 2020		
Space KaBAAM	Action	Auto Slavic	Auto Slavic	Apr 26, 2022	Dec 9, 2021	Dec 9, 2021		
Space KaBAAM 2	Action	Auto Slavic	Auto Slavic	Jun 7, 2022	Jun 7, 2022	Jun 7, 2022		
Space KaBAAM 3	Action	Auto Slavic	Auto Slavic	Aug 19, 2022	Aug 19, 2022	Aug 19, 2022		
SpellForce 3 Reforced	Real-time strategy; role-playing	Grimlore Games	THQ Nordic	Mar 8, 2022	Mar 8, 2022	Mar 8, 2022		
Marvel's Spider-Man 2	Action-adventure	Insomniac Games	Sony Interactive Entertainment	Oct 20, 2023	Oct 20, 2023	Oct 20, 2023	P	
Marvel's Spider-Man: Miles Morales	Action-adventure	Insomniac Games	Sony Interactive Entertainment	Nov 12, 2020	Nov 12, 2020	Nov 19, 2020	CB P	
Marvel's Spider-Man Remastered	Action-adventure	Insomniac Games	Sony Interactive Entertainment	Nov 12, 2020	Nov 12, 2020	Nov 19, 2020	P	
Spin the Book	Unique	Oiven Games	Oiven Games	Unreleased	Jun 13, 2024	Jun 13, 2024		
Spin the Lighthouse	Unique	Oiven Games	Oiven Games	Unreleased	Mar 9, 2024	Mar 9, 2024		
Spirit of the North: Enhanced Edition	Adventure	Infuse Studio	Merge Games	Nov 26, 2020	Nov 26, 2020	Nov 26, 2020		
Split Fiction	Action-adventure; platform	Hazelight Studios	Electronic Arts	Mar 6, 2025	Mar 6, 2025	Mar 6, 2025	CP P	
SRX: The Game	Racing	Monster Games	Monster Games	Unreleased	May 28, 2021	May 28, 2021		
Star Ocean: The Divine Force	Action role-playing	tri-Ace	Square Enix	Oct 27, 2022	Oct 27, 2022	Oct 27, 2022		
Star Trek: Resurgence	Adventure	Dramatic Labs	Bruner House	Oct 26, 2023	Oct 26, 2023	Oct 26, 2023		
Star Wars: Battlefront Classic Collection (Note: Remastered collection of Star Wars: Battlefront and Star Wars: Battlefront II.)	First-person shooter; Third-person shooter	Aspyr	Aspyr	Unreleased	Mar 14, 2024	Mar 14, 2024		
Star Wars: Galactic Racer	Racing	Fuse Games	Secret Mode	Oct 6, 2026	Oct 6, 2026	Oct 6, 2026		
Star Wars: Knights of the Old Republic — Remake	Role-playing	Aspyr	Sony Interactive Entertainment	TBA	TBA	TBA		
Star Wars Episode I: Jedi Power Battles	Action	Aspyr	Aspyr	Unreleased	Jan 25, 2025	Jan 25, 2025		
Star Wars Jedi: Fallen Order	Action-adventure	Respawn Entertainment; Panic Button	Electronic Arts	Jun 11, 2021	Jun 11, 2021	Jun 11, 2021	CB	
Star Wars Jedi: Survivor	Action-adventure	Respawn Entertainment	Electronic Arts	Apr 28, 2023	Apr 28, 2023	Apr 28, 2023	P	
Steam Train Simulator	Simulation	Two Llamas s.r.o.	Two Llamas s.r.o.	Dec 25, 2024	Dec 25, 2024	Dec 25, 2024		
Steelrising	Action role-playing; soulslike	Spiders	Nacon	Sep 8, 2022	Sep 8, 2022	Sep 8, 2022		
The Stone of Madness	Strategy; stealth	Teku Studios	Merge Games	TBA	TBA	TBA		
Stellar Blade	Action-adventure	Shift Up	Sony Interactive Entertainment	Apr 26, 2024	Apr 26, 2024	Apr 26, 2024	P	
Stonefly	Action-adventure	Flight School Studios	MWM Interactive	Jun 1, 2021	Jun 1, 2021	Jun 1, 2021		
Stories from Sol: The Gun-Dog	Adventure	Space Colony Studios	Astrolabe Games	Feb 20, 2025	Feb 20, 2025	Feb 20, 2025		
Stranger of Paradise: Final Fantasy Origin	Action role-playing	Team Ninja	Square Enix	Mar 18, 2022	Mar 18, 2022	Mar 18, 2022		
Stranger Than Heaven	Action-adventure	RGG Studio	Sega	Jan 15, 2027	Jan 15, 2027	Jan 15, 2027		
Stray	Adventure; puzzle	BlueTwelve	Annapurna Interactive	Jul 19, 2022	Jul 19, 2022	Jul 19, 2022		
Stray Blade	Action role-playing	Point Blank	505 Games	Apr 20, 2023	Apr 20, 2023	Apr 20, 2023		
Street Fighter 6	Fighting	Capcom	Capcom	Jun 2, 2023	Jun 2, 2023	Jun 2, 2023		
Street Outlaws 2: Winner Takes All	Racing	Team6 Game Studios	NA: GameMill Entertainment; EU: Maximum Games; FRA: Just For Games	Unreleased	Sep 21, 2021	Sep 21, 2021		
Subnautica	Action-adventure	Unknown Worlds Entertainment	Unknown Worlds Entertainment; Gearbox Publishing	May 14, 2021	May 14, 2021	May 14, 2021	CB	
Subnautica: Below Zero	Action-adventure	Unknown Worlds Entertainment	Unknown Worlds Entertainment; Bandai Namco Entertainment	May 14, 2021	May 14, 2021	May 14, 2021	CB	
Suicide Squad: Kill the Justice League	Action-adventure	Rocksteady Studios	WB Games	Feb 2, 2024	Feb 2, 2024	Feb 2, 2024		
Suikoden I&II HD Remaster Gate Rune and Dunan Unification Wars	Role Playing Games	Konami Digital Entertainment	Konami Digital Entertainment	Mar 6, 2025	Mar 6, 2025	Mar 6, 2025		
Sumatra: Fate of Yandi	Adventure	Ratalaika Games	Ratalaika Games	Unreleased	Mar 18, 2021	Mar 18, 2021		
Sunshower	Arcade	NOKOGODO	NOKOGODO	Mar 17, 2025	Mar 17, 2025	Mar 17, 2025		
Super Animal Royale	Battle royale	Pixile	Modus Games	Aug 26, 2021	Aug 26, 2021	Aug 26, 2021		
Super Bomberman Collection	Action; maze	Red Art Games	Konami	Feb 5, 2026	Feb 5, 2026	Feb 5, 2026		
Super Bomberman R 2	Action; maze	Konami	Konami	Sep 12, 2023	Sep 12, 2023	Sep 12, 2023		
Superliminal	Puzzle	Pillow Castle Games	Pillow Castle Games	Nov 21, 2022	Nov 21, 2022	Nov 21, 2022		
Super Monkey Ball: Banana Mania	Platform	Ryu Ga Gotoku Studio	Sega	Oct 7, 2021	Oct 5, 2021	Oct 5, 2021		
Super Sami Roll	Platform	Sonzai Games	Sonzai Games; X Plus	Unreleased	Nov 4, 2021	Nov 4, 2021		
Super Woden GP	Racing	ViJuDa	Eastasiasoft	Nov 9, 2022	Nov 9, 2022	Nov 9, 2022		
Survivor: Castaway Island	Adventure	Magic Pockets	Microids	TBA	TBA	TBA		
Sword Art Online: Fractured Daydream	Action role-playing	Dimps	Bandai Namco Entertainment	Oct 4, 2024	Oct 4, 2024	Oct 4, 2024		
Sword Art Online: Last Recollection	Action role-playing	Aquria	Bandai Namco Entertainment	Oct 5, 2023	Oct 6, 2023	Oct 6, 2023		
Sword of the Necromancer	Roguelike; role-playing	Grimorio of Games	JanduSoft	TBA	TBA	TBA		
Syberia: The World Before	Graphic adventure	Microïds	Microïds	Jan 27, 2023	Nov 15, 2022	Nov 15, 2022		
Synduality	Third-person shooter	Bandai Namco Studios	Bandai Namco Entertainment	TBA	TBA	TBA		
System Shock	Action-adventure	Nightdive Studios	Prime Matter	Unreleased	May 21, 2024	May 21, 2024		
Tails of Iron	Action role-playing	Odd Bug Studio	United Label	Sep 16, 2021	Sep 16, 2021	Sep 16, 2021	CB	
Tails of Iron 2: Whiskers of Winter	Action role-playing	Odd Bug Studio	United Label	Jan 28, 2025	Jan 28, 2025	Jan 28, 2025		
Tales of Arise	Action role-playing	Bandai Namco Studios	Bandai Namco Entertainment	Sep 9, 2021	Sep 10, 2021	Sep 10, 2021		
Tales of Graces f Remastered	Role-playing	Tose	Bandai Namco Entertainment	Jan 17, 2025	Jan 17, 2025	Jan 17, 2025		
Tales of Kenzera: Zau	Metroidvania	Surgent Studios	EA Originals	Apr 23, 2024	Apr 23, 2024	Apr 23, 2024		
The Talos Principle 2	Puzzle	Croteam	Devolver Digital	Nov 2, 2023	Nov 2, 2023	Nov 2, 2023		
Taxi Life: A City Driving Simulator	Simulation	Simteract	Nancon	Mar 7, 2024	Mar 7, 2024	Mar 7, 2024		
Tchia	Adventure	Awaceb	Awaceb	Mar 21, 2023	Mar 21, 2023	Mar 21, 2023		
Teenage Mutant Ninja Turtles Arcade: Wrath of the Mutants	Fighting	Raw Thrills	GameMill Entertainment	Jun 28, 2024	Apr 23, 2024	Apr 23, 2024		
Tekken 8	Fighting	Bandai Namco Studios	Bandai Namco Entertainment	Jan 26, 2024	Jan 26, 2024	Jan 26, 2024		
Temtem	Adventure; creature collection	Crema	Humble Games	Dec 8, 2020	Dec 8, 2020	Dec 8, 2020		
Tennis Pro Tournaments	Sport	Ocean Media	Ocean Media	Oct 30, 2023	Oct 30, 2023	Oct 30, 2023		
Terminator: Resistance Enhanced	First-person shooter	Teyon	Reef Entertainment	Unreleased	Apr 30, 2021	Apr 30, 2021	CB	
Tesla Force	Shooter	10tons	10tons	Unreleased	Nov 24, 2020	Nov 24, 2020	CB	
Tesla vs Lovecraft	Action; arcade; shooter	10tons	10tons	Unreleased	Dec 4, 2020	Dec 4, 2020		
Test Drive Unlimited Solar Crown	Racing	Kylotonn	Nacon	Sep 12, 2021	Sep 12, 2024	Sep 12, 2024		
Tetris Forever	Puzzle	Digital Eclipse	Digital Eclipse	Nov 12, 2024	Nov 12, 2024	Nov 12, 2024		
Thank Goodness You're Here!	Adventure	Coal Supper	Panic	Aug 1, 2024	Aug 1, 2024	Aug 1, 2024		
Them's Fightin' Herds	Fighting	Mane6	Modus Games	Oct 27, 2022	Oct 18, 2022	Oct 18, 2022		
Thomas & Friends: Wonders of Sodor	Adventure	Dovetail Games	Dovetail Games	Mar 17, 2026	Mar 17, 2026	Mar 17, 2026		
Tides of Annihilation	Action-adventure	Eclipse Glow Games	Eclipse Glow Games	TBA	TBA	TBA		
Tides of Tomorrow	Adventure	DigixArt	Deep Silver	Feb 24, 2026	Feb 24, 2026	Feb 24, 2026		
Timothy's Night	Action-adventure	Wild Sphere S.L.	Wild Sphere S.L.	Unreleased	Aug 26, 2021	Aug 26, 2021		
Tin Hearts	Puzzle	Rogue Sun	Wired Productions	May 16, 2023	May 16, 2023	May 16, 2023		
Tiny Tina's Wonderlands	Action role-playing; fantasy; shooter	Gearbox Software	2K	Mar 25, 2022	Mar 25, 2022	Mar 25, 2022		
TOEM	Adventure	Something We Made	Something We Made	Unreleased	Sep 17, 2021	Sep 17, 2021		
Tomb Raider I–III Remastered	Shooter; Puzzle; Adventure; Platform	Aspyr	Aspyr	Feb 14, 2024	Feb 14, 2024	Feb 14, 2024		
Tomb Raider IV–VI Remastered	Shooter; Puzzle; Adventure; Platform	Aspyr	Aspyr	Feb 14, 2025	Feb 14, 2025	Feb 14, 2025		
Tomb Raider: Catalyst	Action-adventure	Crystal Dynamics	Amazon Game Studios	2027	2028	2027		
Tomb Raider: Legacy of Atlantis	Action-adventure	Crystal Dynamics; Flying Wild Hog	Amazon Game Studios	Feb 12, 2027	Feb 12, 2027	Feb 12, 2027		
Tom Clancy's Rainbow Six Extraction	Tactical shooter	Ubisoft Montreal	Ubisoft	Jan 20, 2022	Jan 20, 2022	Jan 20, 2022	CP	
Tom Clancy's Rainbow Six Siege	Tactical shooter	Ubisoft Montreal	Ubisoft	Dec 1, 2020	Dec 1, 2020	Dec 1, 2020	CB	
Tony Hawk's Pro Skater 1 + 2	Sports	Vicarious Visions	Activision	Mar 26, 2021	Mar 26, 2021	Mar 26, 2021		
Tony Hawk's Pro Skater 3 + 4	Sports	Iron Galaxy	Activision	Jul 11, 2025	Jul 11, 2025	Jul 11, 2025	P	
TopSpin 2K25	Sports; Simulation	Hungar 13	2K	Apr 26, 2024	Apr 26, 2024	Apr 26, 2024		
Tormented Souls	Survival horror	Dual Effect; Abstract Digital	PQube	Aug 27, 2021	Aug 27, 2021	Aug 27, 2021		
Total Trails	Driving; Racing	Repixel8	Repixel8	Feb 15, 2024	Feb 15, 2024	Feb 15, 2024		
Touhou Luna Nights	Action-adventure	Team Ladybug, Why So Serious?	Playism	Jan 25, 2024	Jan 25, 2024	Jan 25, 2024		
The Touryst	Action-adventure	Shin'en Multimedia	Shin'en Multimedia	Sep 9, 2021	Sep 9, 2021	Sep 9, 2021		
Toy's Brawl	Shooter game; Casual	CUDIT	CUDIT	Apr 15, 2025	Apr 15, 2025	Apr 15, 2025		
Trails in the Sky 1st Chapter	Role-playing	Nihon Falcom	NA: GungHo; EU: Clear River Games	Sep 19, 2025	Sep 19, 2025	Sep 19, 2025		
Trails in the Sky 2nd Chapter	Role-playing	Nihon Falcom	NA: GungHo; EU: Clear River Games	Sep 17, 2026	Sep 17, 2026	Sep 17, 2026		
Train Sim World 5	Vehicle simulation	Dovetail Games	Dovetail Games	Sep 17, 2024	Sep 17, 2024	Sep 17, 2024		
Tralalero Tralala Jumper	Action	Oiven Games	Oiven Games	Unreleased	Jun 4, 2025	Unreleased		
TramSim: Console Edition	Simulation	ViewApp	Dovetail Games	Apr 25, 2023	Apr 25, 2023	Apr 25, 2023		
Treasures of the Aegean	Platforms game; Indie game; Adventure	Undercoders	Numskull Games	Nov 11, 2021	Nov 11, 2021	Nov 11, 2021		
Trek to Yomi	Action-adventure	Flying Wild Hog	Devolver Digital	May 5, 2022	May 5, 2022	May 5, 2022		
Trepang2	First-person shooter	Trepang Studios	Team17	Unreleased	Oct 2, 2023	Oct 2, 2023		
Tribes of Midgard	Survival	Norsfell	Gearbox Publishing	Jul 27, 2021	Jul 27, 2021	Jul 27, 2021		
Trifox	Action-adventure	Glowfish Interactive	Big Sugar	Unreleased	Nov 23, 2022	Nov 23, 2022		
Tropico 6	Construction and management simulation; government simulation	Realmforge Studios	Kalypso Media	Mar 31, 2022	Mar 31, 2022	Mar 31, 2022		
Truck Driver: The American Dream	Simulation video game	Kyodai Limited	Soedesco	Unreleased	Sep 26, 2023	Unreleased		
Truxton Extreme	Shoot 'em up	Tatsujin	Tatsujin	TBA	TBA	TBA		
Tuesday Morning	Action-adventure	Fears Ahead Studios	Fears Ahead Studios	TBA	TBA	TBA		
Tung Tung Tung Sahur Runner	Action	Oiven Games	Oiven Games	Unreleased	May 21, 2025	May 21, 2025		
Twelve Minutes	Adventure	Luís António	Annapurna Interactive	Unreleased	Dec 7, 2021	Dec 7, 2021		
Twin Robots: Ultimate Edition	Action-adventure; puzzle	Thinice Games	Ratalaika Games	Unreleased	Dec 7, 2020	Dec 7, 2020		
Two Point Campus	Business simulation	Two Point Studios	Sega	Aug 9, 2022	Aug 9, 2022	Aug 9, 2022		
Two Point Museum	Business simulation	Two Point Studios	Sega	Mar 4, 2025	Mar 4, 2025	Mar 4, 2025		
UFL	Sports	Strikerz	Strikerz	Dec 5, 2024	Dec 5, 2024	Dec 5, 2024	P	
Ultimate Fishing Simulator 2	Fishing; simulation	MasterCode	Ultimate Games	TBA	TBA	TBA		
Ultimate Sparring	Casual	Nextgo24 UG	Nextgo24 UG	Feb 26, 2025	Feb 26, 2025	Feb 26, 2025		
Uncharted: Legacy of Thieves Collection	Action-adventure; third-person shooter; platformer	Naughty Dog	Sony Interactive Entertainment	Jan 28, 2022	Jan 28, 2022	Jan 28, 2022		
Until Dawn	Horror; Action-adventure; Interactive drama	Ballistic Moon	Sony Interactive Entertainment	Oct 4, 2024	Oct 4, 2024	Oct 4, 2024	P	
Undisputed	Sports	Steel City Interactive	Deep Silver	Oct 11, 2024	Oct 11, 2024	Oct 11, 2024		
Undead Horde	Role-playing; real-time strategy	10tons	10tons	Unreleased	Nov 12, 2020	Nov 12, 2020	CB	
Undernauts: Labyrinth of Yomi	Role-playing; rougelike	Experience	Aksys Games	Unreleased	Aug 11, 2022	Sep 16, 2022		
Under Night In-Birth II [Sys:Celes]	Fighting	French-Bread	Arc System Works	Jan 25, 2024	Jan 25, 2024	Jan 25, 2024		
Universal Flight Simulator Extended	Simulation	Pix Arts	Pix Arts	Dec 22, 2023	Dec 22, 2023	Dec 22, 2023		
Unknown 9: Awakening	Action-adventure	Reflector Entertainment	Reflector Entertainment	Oct 18, 2024	Oct 18, 2024	Oct 18, 2024		
Utawarerumono: Zan 2	Action role-playing; hack and slash	Tamsoft	Aquaplus	Jul 22, 2021	Unreleased	Unreleased		
Valkyrie Elysium	Action role-playing	Soleil	Square Enix	Sep 29, 2022	Sep 29, 2022	Sep 29, 2022	CB	
Vampire: The Masquerade – Bloodhunt	Battle royale	Sharkmob	Sharkmob	Apr 27, 2022	Apr 27, 2022	Apr 27, 2022		
Vampire: The Masquerade – Bloodlines 2	Action role-playing	The Chinese Room	Paradox Interactive, White Wolf Publishing	Oct 21, 2025	Oct 21, 2025	Oct 21, 2025		
Vampire: The Masquerade – Swansong	Action role-playing	Big Bad Wolf	Nacon	Unreleased	May 19, 2022	May 19, 2022		
Venus Vacation Prism: Dead or Alive Xtreme	Dating sim	Team Ninja	Koei Tecmo	Mar 27, 2025	Unreleased	Unreleased		
Vigor	Loot shooter	Bohemia Interactive	Bohemia Interactive	Dec 9, 2020	Dec 9, 2020	Dec 9, 2020		
Virtua Fighter 5 R.E.V.O. World Stage	Fighting	Ryu Ga Gotoku Studio	Sega	Oct 30, 2025	Oct 30, 2025	Oct 30, 2025		
Visions of Mana	Action role-playing	Ouka Studios	Square Enix	Aug 29, 2024	Aug 29, 2024	Aug 29, 2024		
Visco Collection	Shooter game; Fighting; Platform; Sports; Simulation	QUByte Interactive	QUByte Interactive	Oct 26, 2023	Oct 26, 2023	Oct 26, 2023		
Void Terrarium Plus	Role-playing; roguelike	Nippon Ichi Software	Nippon Ichi Software	Feb 18, 2021	May 18, 2021	May 21, 2021		
Wanderstop	Simulator	Ivy Road	Annapurna Interactive	Mar 11, 2025	Mar 11, 2025	Mar 11, 2025		
Watch Dogs: Legion	Action-adventure	Ubisoft Toronto	Ubisoft	Nov 12, 2020	Nov 12, 2020	Nov 19, 2020	CB	
Warframe	Action role-playing; third-person shooter	Digital Extremes	Digital Extremes	Nov 26, 2020	Nov 26, 2020	Nov 26, 2020	CP P	
Warhammer 40,000: Darktide	Action; first-person shooter	Fatshark	Fatshark	Dec 3, 2024	Dec 3, 2024	Dec 3, 2024		
Warhammer 40,000: Shootas, Blood & Teef	Run and gun	Rogueside	Rogueside	Dec 2, 2022	Dec 2, 2022	Dec 2, 2022		
Warhammer 40,000: Space Marine II	Third-person shooter	Saber Interactive	Focus Entertainment	Sep 9, 2024	Sep 9, 2024	Sep 9, 2024		
Warhammer: Chaosbane	Action role-playing; hack and slash	Eko Software	Bigben Interactive	Nov 12, 2020	Nov 12, 2020	Nov 19, 2020		
War Hospital	Strategy	Brave Lamb Studio	Movie Games	Jan 11, 2024	Jan 11, 2024	Jan 11, 2024		
War Mongrels	Real-time tactics	Destructive Creations	All in! Games	Apr 25, 2023	Apr 25, 2023	Apr 25, 2023		
War Thunder	Action; vehicular combat; combat flight simulator	Gaijin Entertainment	Gaijin Entertainment	Nov 16, 2020	Nov 17, 2020	Nov 17, 2020	P	
Warsaw	Tactical role-playing	Pixelated Milk	Pixelated Milk	Nov 12, 2020	Nov 12, 2020	Nov 12, 2020		
Wayfinder	Action role-playing	Airship Syndicate	Digital Extremes	Aug 17, 2023	Aug 17, 2023	Aug 17, 2023		
Werewolf: The Apocalypse – Earthblood	Action role-playing	Cyanide	Nacon	Unreleased	Feb 4, 2021	Feb 4, 2021	CB	
Where Winds Meet	Action role-playing	Everstone Studio	NetEase	Nov 14, 2025	Nov 14, 2025	Nov 14, 2025		
White Shadows	Platform	Monokel	Mixtvision Games	Unreleased	Dec 6, 2021	Jul 12, 2021		
Wild Hearts	Action	Omega Force	Electronic Arts	Feb 17, 2023	Feb 17, 2023	Feb 17, 2023		
Wild Hunter: Sniper Rifle Adventures Simulator	Shooter; Casual	GameToTop Corporation	GameToTop Corporation	Oct 3, 2024	Oct 3, 2024	Oct 3, 2024		
The Winds Rising	Action role-playing	TiGames	TiGames	TBA	TBA	TBA		
The Witcher 3: Wild Hunt	Action role-playing	CD Projekt Red	CD Projekt	Dec 14, 2022	Dec 14, 2022	Dec 14, 2022	CB	
Wizard with a Gun	Twin-stick shooter	Galvanic Games	Devolver Digital	Oct 17, 2023	Oct 17, 2023	Oct 17, 2023		
The Wolf Among Us 2	Graphic adventure	Telltale Games; AdHoc Studio	Telltale Games; Athlon Games	TBA	TBA	TBA		
Marvel's Wolverine	Adventure	Insomniac Games	Sony Interactive Entertainment	Sep 15, 2026	Sep 15, 2026	Sep 15, 2026		
Wo Long: Fallen Dynasty	Action role-playing	Team Ninja	Koei Tecmo	Mar 3, 2023	Mar 3, 2023	Mar 3, 2023		
World of Warships: Legends	Vehicular combat	Lesta Studio	Wargaming	Apr 26, 2021	Apr 26, 2021	Apr 26, 2021	P	
World War Z: Aftermath	Third-person shooter	Saber Interactive	Mad Dog Games	Unreleased	Jan 24, 2023	Jan 24, 2023		
Wordbreaker by POWGI	Puzzle	Lightwood Games	Lightwood Games	Unreleased	Mar 14, 2022	Mar 14, 2022		
Worms Rumble	Artillery; battle royale; strategy	Team17	Team17	Dec 1, 2020	Dec 1, 2020	Dec 1, 2020	CP	
WRC 9	Racing; simulation	Kylotonn	Nacon	Nov 12, 2020	Nov 12, 2020	Nov 19, 2020	CB	
WRC 10	Racing; simulation	Kylotonn	Nacon	Sep 2, 2021	Sep 2, 2021	Sep 2, 2021		
Wreckfest	Vehicular combat; racing	Bugbear Entertainment	THQ Nordic	Jun 1, 2021	Jun 1, 2021	Jun 1, 2021	(Note: On 4 May 2021, the game was available early to active PlayStation Plus subscribers.)	
Wuchang: Fallen Feathers	Soulslike; Action role-playing	Leenzee	505 Games	Jul 24, 2025	Jul 24, 2025	Jul 24, 2025		
Wuthering Waves	Action role-playing	Kuro Games	Kuro Games	Jan 2, 2025	Jan 2, 2025	Jan 2, 2025		
WW2 Rebuilder	Simulator; Educational; Action	Madnetic Games	PlayWay	Unreleased	May 10, 2024	May 10, 2024		
WWE 2K22	Sports	Visual Concepts	2K	Mar 11, 2022	Mar 11, 2022	Mar 11, 2022		
WWE 2K23	Sports	Visual Concepts	2K	Mar 17, 2023	Mar 17, 2023	Mar 17, 2023		
WWE 2K24	Sports	Visual Concepts	2K	Mar 8, 2024	Mar 8, 2024	Mar 8, 2024		
WWE 2K25	Sports	Visual Concepts	2K	Mar 14, 2025	Mar 14, 2025	Mar 14, 2025		
XDefiant	First-person shooter	Ubisoft San Francisco	Ubisoft	May 21, 2024	May 21, 2024	May 21, 2024	CP	
Yakuza Kiwami 3 & Dark Ties	Action-adventure; Beat 'em up	Ryu Ga Gotoku Studio	Sega	Feb 12, 2026	Feb 12, 2026	Feb 12, 2026		
Yakuza: Like a Dragon	Role-playing	Ryu Ga Gotoku Studio	Sega	Mar 2, 2021	Mar 2, 2021	Mar 2, 2021	CB	
Yars Rising	Platform	WayForward	Atari	Sep 10, 2024	Sep 10, 2024	Sep 10, 2024		
Yeah! You Want "Those Games," Right? So Here You Go! Now, Let's See You Clear Them!	Puzzle	Monkeycraft	D3 Publisher	Unreleased	Jan 10, 2024	Jan 10, 2024		
Yeah! You Want "Those Games," Right? So Here You Go! Now, Let's See You Clear Them! 2	Puzzle	Monkeycraft	D3 Publisher	Unreleased	Jul 17, 2024	Jul 17, 2024		
Your Computer Might Be At Risk	Puzzle	Sergio Escanciano Arribas as Tenebris Studio	Sergio Escanciano Arribas as Tenebris Studio	Nov 10, 2023	Nov 10, 2023	Nov 10, 2023		
Ys: The Oath in Felghana	Action role-playing	Nihon Falcom	JP: Nihon Falcom; NA: Xseed Games; PAL: Marvelous Europe	May 23, 2024	Jan 7, 2025	Jan 7, 2025		
Ys VIII: Lacrimosa of Dana	Action role-playing	Nihon Falcom	NIS America	Unreleased	Nov 15, 2022	Nov 18, 2022		
Ys IX: Monstrum Nox	Action role-playing	Nihon Falcom	NIS America	Unreleased	May 9, 2023	May 12, 2023		
Ys X: Nordics	Action role-playing	Nihon Falcom	NIS America	Sep 28, 2023	Oct 25, 2024	Oct 25, 2024		
Yu-Gi-Oh! Master Duel	Card battle	Konami	Konami	Jan 28, 2022	Jan 28, 2022	Jan 28, 2022		
Yuoni	Survival horror	Tricore	Chorus Worldwide	Aug 19, 2021	Aug 19, 2021	Aug 19, 2021		
Yurukill: The Calumniation Games	Shoot 'em up	G.Rev	JP: Izanagi Games; WW: NIS America	Apr 14, 2022	Jun 7, 2022	Jun 10, 2022		
Zaggy Car	Casual; Driving; Racing	Zakym	Zakym	Jul 5, 2024	Jul 5, 2024	Jul 5, 2024		
Zenless Zone Zero	Action role-playing; hack and slash	miHoYo	miHoYo	Jul 4, 2024	Jul 4, 2024	Jul 4, 2024		
Zenith: Nexus	Role-playing	TRIBEVR	TRIBEVR	Unreleased	Feb 21, 2023	Feb 21, 2023		
Zero Parades: For Dead Spies	Role-playing	ZA/UM	ZA/UM	TBA	TBA	TBA		
Zlorp Adventures	Casual	QH Studios	QH Studios	Unreleased	Jan 19, 2025	Jan 19, 2025		
Zodiac Quest	Casual	Two Llamas s.r.o.	Two Llamas s.r.o.	Aug 17, 2024	Aug 17, 2024	Aug 17, 2024		
Zombie Soup	Action	AeonSparx Interactive	Astrolabe Games	Aug 9, 2023	Aug 9, 2023	Aug 9, 2023		

== See also ==
- List of PlayStation VR2 games
- List of PlayStation 4 games
- List of PlayStation applications
- List of Xbox Series X and Series S games
- List of Nintendo Switch games
- List of Nintendo Switch 2 games
