= List of best-selling PC games =

This is a list of personal computer games (video games for personal computers, including those running Windows, macOS, and Linux) that have sold or shipped at least one million copies. If a game was released on multiple platforms, the sales figures list are only for PC sales. This list is not comprehensive because sales figures are not always publicly available.

Subscription figures for massively multiplayer online games such as Flight Simulator or Lineage and number of accounts from free-to-play games such as Hearthstone are not taken into account as they do not necessarily correspond to sales.

== List ==
Games that have sold or shipped at least one million copies on PC platforms, such as Windows, macOS, and Linux
Game	Total copies sold	Series	Release date	Genre(s)	Developer(s)	Publisher(s)
PUBG: Battlegrounds	41 million	PUBG Universe	December 20, 2017	Battle royale	PUBG Studios	Krafton
Minecraft	33 million	Minecraft	November 18, 2011 (Note: Although Minecraft was first publicly available on May 17, 2009, and the 1.0 version on November 18, 2011, the first version of Minecraft which required a paid account was first publicly available on December 23, 2009, therefore it started accumulating sales in that year.)	Sandbox, survival	Mojang Studios	
Terraria	32 million	—N/a	May 16, 2011	Action-adventure	Re-Logic	
Stardew Valley	26 million	—N/a	February 26, 2016	Farm life sim, role-playing	ConcernedApe (Note: Published by Chucklefish between 2016–2018)	
Garry's Mod	25.4 million	—N/a	November 29, 2006	Sandbox	Facepunch Studios	Valve
Euro Truck Simulator 2	22 million	Truck Simulator	October 19, 2012	Vehicle simulation	SCS Software	
Phasmophobia	21 million	—N/a	September 18, 2020 (Note: This release date is for early access)	Survival horror, puzzle	Kinetic Games	
Diablo III	20 million (Note: This excludes the 1.2 million copies given away as part of Blizzard's World of Warcraft annual pass offer.)	Diablo	May 15, 2012	Action role-playing	Blizzard Entertainment	
Meccha Chameleon	20 million	—N/a	June 10, 2026	Casual	Lemorion_1224 and Haganeiro	
Rust	20 million	—N/a	February 8, 2018	Survival	Facepunch Studios	
Counter-Strike: Source	15 million (Note: Estimates obtained using a now closed exploit of Steam's achievement system. Only includes Steam sales up to July 2018. Figures are lower bound estimates, as they only include copies that were started at least once. If included in the list, the game was never offered for free on steam before July 2018, as free copies would inflate the numbers.)	Counter-Strike	November 1, 2004	First-person shooter	Valve	
World of Warcraft	14 million (Note: Subscribers are not the same as sales; many Asian markets use a different business model that does not involve retail copies. As such subscriber figures do not equate to sales figures.)	Warcraft	November 23, 2004	Massively multiplayer action role-playing	Blizzard Entertainment	
Helldivers 2	12.6 million	—N/a	February 8, 2024	Third-person shooter	Arrowhead Game Studios	Sony Interactive Entertainment
Grand Theft Auto V	12.6 million	Grand Theft Auto	April 14, 2015	Action-adventure	Rockstar North	Rockstar Games
Half-Life 2	12.3 million	Half-Life	November 16, 2004	First-person shooter	Valve	Valve
The Witcher 3: Wild Hunt	12 million	The Witcher	May 19, 2015	Action role-playing	CD Projekt Red	CD Projekt
Valheim	12 million	—N/a	February 2, 2021	Survival	Iron Gate	Coffee Stain Publishing
The Sims	11 million	The Sims	February 4, 2000	Life simulation	Maxis	Electronic Arts
StarCraft	11 million	StarCraft	March 31, 1998	Real-time strategy	Blizzard Entertainment	
Ready or Not	10 million	—N/a	December 13, 2023	Tactical first-person shooter	VOID Interactive	
Kingdom Come: Deliverance	10 million	—N/a	February 13, 2018	Action role-playing	Warhorse Studios	
RollerCoaster Tycoon 3	10 million	RollerCoaster Tycoon	October 26, 2004	Construction and management simulation	Frontier Developments	Atari Interactive (Windows); Aspyr Media (macOS)
Fall Guys	10 million	—N/a	August 4, 2020	Battle royale	Mediatonic	Devolver Digital
Peak	10 million	—N/a	June 16, 2025	Cooperative, climbing	Aggro Crab Landfall	
Civilization V	8 million	Civilization	September 2010	Turn-based strategy, 4X	Firaxis Games	2K Games & Aspyr
Deep Rock Galactic	8 million	—N/a	May 13, 2020	First-person shooter	Ghost Ship Games	Coffee Stain Publishing
Cyberpunk 2077	7.67 million (Note: Of the 13.7 million total units sold by April 2021, 56% were for the PC version.)	—N/a	December 10, 2020	Action role-playing	CD Projekt Red	CD Projekt
The Sims 3	7 million	The Sims	June 2, 2009	Life simulation	Maxis	Electronic Arts
Star Wars: Empire at War	6.7 million	—N/a	February 16, 2006	Real-time strategy	Petroglyph Games	LucasArts; Aspyr (Mac OS X)
Guild Wars	6.5 million	Guild Wars	April 28, 2005	Massively multiplayer action role-playing	ArenaNet	NCsoft
The Sims 2	6 million	The Sims	September 14, 2004	Life simulation	Maxis	Electronic Arts
Cities: Skylines	6 million	—N/a	March 10, 2015	City-building	Colossal Order	Paradox Interactive
StarCraft II: Wings of Liberty	6 million	StarCraft	July 27, 2010	Real-time strategy	Blizzard Entertainment	
Myst	6 million	Myst	September 24, 1993	Adventure, puzzle	Cyan	Broderbund
Age of Empires II HD	5.8 million	Age of Empires	April 9, 2013	Real-time strategy	Ensemble Studios	Microsoft
Last Ninja 2	5.5 million	Last Ninja	August 29, 1988	Action-adventure	System 3	Activision
ARMA 3	5.5 million	ARMA	September 12, 2013	Tactical shooter	Bohemia Interactive	
Satisfactory	5.5 million	—N/a	March 19, 2019	Construction and management simulation	Coffee Stain Studios	
Tomb Raider	5.5 million	Tomb Raider	March 5, 2013	Action-adventure	Crystal Dynamics	Square Enix Europe
The Forest	5.3 million	—N/a	April 30, 2018	Survival	Endnight Games	
Fallout: New Vegas	5.2 million	Fallout	October 19, 2010	Action role-playing	Obsidian Entertainment	Bethesda Softworks
Baldur's Gate 3	5.2 million	Baldur's Gate	August 3, 2023	Role-playing game	Larian Studios	
Sea of Thieves	5 million	—N/a	June 3, 2020	Adventure	Rare Ltd	Xbox Game Studios
SimCity 3000	5 million	SimCity	January 31, 1999	City-building	Maxis	Electronic Arts
Guild Wars 2	5 million	Guild Wars	August 28, 2012	Massively multiplayer action role-playing	ArenaNet	NCsoft
Arma 2: Operation Arrowhead	4.5 million	ARMA	June 29, 2010	Tactical shooter	Bohemia Interactive Studio	505 Games (EU) Meridian4 (NA)
RV There Yet?	4.5 million	—N/a	21 October 2025	Cooperative adventure	Nuggets Entertainment	
BioShock Infinite	4.5 million	BioShock	March 26, 2013	First-person shooter	Irrational Games	2K
American Truck Simulator	4 million	Truck Simulator	October 19, 2012	Vehicle simulation	SCS Software	
The Last Ninja	4 million	Last Ninja	1987	Action-adventure	System 3	Activision
Risk of Rain 2	4 million	Risk of Rain	August 11, 2020	Roguelike, Third-person shooter	Hopoo Games	Gearbox Publishing
Diablo II	4 million	Diablo	June 29, 2000	Action role-playing	Blizzard North	Blizzard Entertainment
DayZ	4 million	—N/a	December 16, 2013	Survival	Bohemia Interactive	
Buckshot Roulette	4 million	—N/a	April 4, 2024	Horror	Mike Klubnika	Mike Klubnika (Itch.io); Critical Reflex (Steam)
Where in the World Is Carmen Sandiego?	4 million	Carmen Sandiego	June 1, 1985	Educational	Broderbund	
Populous	4 million	Populous	June 5, 1989	God game	Bullfrog Productions	Electronic Arts
RollerCoaster Tycoon	4 million	RollerCoaster Tycoon	March 31, 1999	Construction and management simulation	Chris Sawyer	Hasbro Interactive
Warhammer 40,000: Dawn of War (including expansions)	4 million	Warhammer	September 20, 2004	Real-time strategy	Relic Entertainment	THQ
Sid Meier's Civilization VI	3.7 million	Sid Meier's Civilization	October 21, 2016	4X turn-based strategy	Firaxis Games	2K
Dark Souls: Prepare to Die Edition	3.6 million	Dark Souls	August 23, 2012	Action role-playing	FromSoftware	Namco Bandai Games
Factorio	3.5 million	—N/a	February 2016	Construction and management simulation	Wube Software	
Dark Souls III	3.3 million	Dark Souls	April 12, 2016	Action role-playing	FromSoftware	Bandai Namco Entertainment; FromSoftware
Total War: Three Kingdoms	3.2 million	Total War	May 23, 2019	Turn-based strategy, real-time tactics	Creative Assembly	Sega
Mount & Blade : Bannerlord	3.1 million	Mount & Blade	March 27, 2020	Action role-playing, strategy	TaleWorlds Entertainment	TaleWorlds Entertainment Prime Matter (Physical)
Resident Evil 4: Ultimate HD Edition	3.1 million	Resident Evil	February 27, 2014	Third-person shooter, survival horror	Capcom	
Manor Lords	3 million	—N/a	April 26, 2024	City-Building,real-time tactics	Slavic Magic	Hooded Horse
Command & Conquer	3 million	Command & Conquer	August 31, 1995	Real-time strategy	Westwood Studios	Virgin Interactive; Electronic Arts (since 1998; also freeware release)
Command & Conquer: Red Alert	3 million	Command & Conquer	October 31, 1996	Real-time strategy	Westwood Studios	Virgin Interactive
Age of Empires	3 million	Age of Empires	October 15, 1997	Real-time strategy	Ensemble Studios	Microsoft
EverQuest	3 million	EverQuest	March 16, 1999	Massively multiplayer action role-playing	Verant Interactive	Sony Online Entertainment
Warcraft III: Reign of Chaos	3 million	Warcraft	July 3, 2002	Real-time strategy	Blizzard Entertainment	Blizzard Entertainment (North America); Sierra Entertainment (Europe); Capcom (Japan)
Escape from Duckov	3 million	—N/a	October 16, 2025	Extraction shooter	Team Soda	Bilibili
Civilization IV	3 million	Civilization	October 25, 2005	Turn-based strategy, 4X	Firaxis Games	2K Games Aspyr
Crysis	3 million	Crysis	November 13, 2007	First-person shooter	Crytek	Electronic Arts
The Binding of Isaac	3 million	—N/a	September 28, 2011	Action-adventure, roguelike	Edmund McMillen Florian Himsl	Headup Games
Space Engineers	3 million	—N/a	October 13, 2013	Simulation	Keen Software House	
POD	3 million	POD	February 28, 1997	Racing	Ubi Soft	
V Rising	3 million	—N/a	May 17, 2022	Survival, base building, hack and slash	Stunlock Studios	
Kenshi	3 million	—N/a	December 6, 2018	Real-time strategy, action role-playing	Lo-Fi Games	
Super Meat Boy	3 million	Super Meat Boy	October 20, 2010	Platformer	Team Meat	
Hitman: Absolution	2.8 million	Hitman	November 20, 2012	Action, stealth	IO Interactive	Square Enix Europe
Outlast	2.8 million	Outlast	September 4, 2013	Survival horror	Red Barrels	
The Walking Dead	2.8 million	The Walking Dead	2012	Graphic adventure	Telltale Games	
Prison Architect	2.8 million	—N/a	October 6, 2015	Construction and management simulation	Introversion Software Double Eleven	Introversion Software Paradox Interactive
Subnautica	2.8 million	—N/a	January 23, 2018	Action-adventure survival	Unknown Worlds Entertainment	
Magicka	2.8 million	—N/a	January 25, 2011	Action-adventure	Arrowhead Game Studios	Paradox Interactive
Infestation: Survivor Stories	2.8 million	—N/a	December 17, 2012	Survival horror	Hammerpoint Interactive	OP Productions
Dark Souls II	2.7 million (Note: Includes sales of Dark Souls II: Scholar of the First Sin)	Dark Souls	April 24, 2014	Action role-playing	FromSoftware	Bandai Namco Games; FromSoftware
Half-Life	2.5 million	Half-Life	November 19, 1998	First-person shooter	Valve	Sierra Studios
Lords of the Realm II	2.5 million	Lord of the Realm	October 31, 1996	Turn-based strategy	Impressions Game	
Caesar II	2.5 million	Caesar	September 4, 1995	City-building	Impressions Game	Sierra On-Line
Caesar III	2.5 million	Caesar	May 30, 1999	City-building	Impressions Game	Sierra Studios
Anno 1602	2.5 million	Anno	September 24, 1998	City-building	Max Design	Sunflowers
Detroit : Become Human	2.5 million	—N/a	December 12, 2019	Adventure	Quantic Dream	Sony Interactive Entertainment
Starbound	2.5 million	—N/a	July 22, 2016	Action-adventure	Chucklefish	
Hotline Miami	2.5 million	Hotline Miami	October 23, 2012	Top-down shooter	Dennaton Games	Devolver Digital
Rise of the Tomb Raider	2.5 million	Tomb Raider	January 28, 2016	Action-adventure	Crystal Dynamics	Microsoft Studios Square Enix
Battlefield 1942	2.47 million	Battlefield	September 10, 2002	First-person shooter	EA DICE	Electronic Arts
Batman: Arkham City - Game of the Year Edition	2.47 million	Batman: Arkham	May 29, 2012	Action-adventure	Rocksteady Studios	Warner Bros. Interactive Entertainment
Command & Conquer: Tiberian Sun	2.4 million	Command & Conquer	August 27, 1999	Real-time strategy	Westwood Studios	Electronic Arts
Horizon Zero Dawn	2.39 million	Horizon	August 7, 2020	Action role-playing	Guerrilla Games	Sony Interactive Entertainment
Mafia II	2.3 million	Mafia	August 24, 2010	Action-adventure	2K Czech	2K
Papers, Please	2.3 million	—N/a	August 8, 2012	Puzzle, simulation	3909 LLC	
Balatro	2.2 million	—N/a	February 21, 2024	Roguelike Deck Builder	LocalThunk	Playstack
Content Warning	2.2 million	—N/a	April 1, 2024	Survival horror	Skog, Zorro, Wilnyl, Philip, thePetHen	Landfall Publishing
Last Epoch	2.1 million	—N/a	February 21, 2024	Action role-playing	Eleventh Hour Games	
Final Fantasy VII	2.1 million (Note: Final Fantasy VII: 1998 physical Windows release – 1 million; 2013 digital Steam release – 1,136,100)	Final Fantasy	June 25, 1998	Role-playing	Square	Eidos Interactive
Banished	2.1 million	—N/a	February 18, 2014	City-building	Shining Rock Software	
IL-2 Sturmovik	2 million	IL-2 Sturmovik	November 30, 2001	Combat flight simulator	Maddox Games	1C Ubisoft
Deer Hunter	2 million	Deer Hunter	November 13, 1997	Sports	Sunstorm Interactive	WizardWorks
Doom	2 million	Doom	December 10, 1993	First-person shooter	id Software	
Doom II: Hell on Earth	2 million	Doom	October 10, 1994	First-person shooter	id Software	GT Interactive
Warcraft II: Tides of Darkness	2 million	Warcraft	December 9, 1995	Real-time strategy	Blizzard Entertainment	
Plague Inc.: Evolved	2 million	Plague Inc.	February 18, 2016	Real-time strategy simulation	Ndemic Creations	
Baldur's Gate	2 million	Baldur's Gate	December 21, 1998	Role-playing	BioWare; Black Isle Studios	Interplay Entertainment
Baldur's Gate II: Shadows of Amn	2 million	Baldur's Gate	September 21, 2000	Computer role-playing	BioWare	Interplay Entertainment
Age of Empires II: The Age of Kings	2 million	Age of Empires	September 30, 1999	Real-time strategy	Ensemble Studios	Microsoft
Black & White	2 million	Black & White	March 25, 2001	God	Lionhead Studios	EA Games; Sold-Out Software
Orion: Prelude	2 million	—N/a	May 4, 2012	First-person shooter online, cooperative multiplayer	Spiral Game Studios	
Civilization III	2 million	Civilization	October 30, 2001	Turn-based strategy, 4X	Firaxis Games	Infogrames Interactive
Sons of the Forest	2 million	The Forest	February 22, 2024	Horror, survival	Endnight Games	Newnight
Neverwinter Nights	2 million	Neverwinter Nights	June 18, 2002	Role-playing	BioWare	Infogrames/Atari
Stronghold: Crusader	2 million	Stronghold	July 31, 2002	Real-time strategy	Firefly Studios	Take-Two Interactive / Gathering of Developers
Mafia: The City of Lost Heaven	2 million	Mafia	August 28, 2002	Third-person shooter	Illusion Softworks	Gathering of Developers
SimCity 4	2 million	SimCity	January 14, 2003	City-building	Maxis	Electronic Arts (Windows); Aspyr Media (macOS)
Anno 1503	2 million	Anno	March 23, 2003	City-building	Max Design	Sunflowers
Counter-Strike: Condition Zero	2 million	Counter-Strike	March 23, 2004	First-person shooter	Valve; Gearbox Software; Ritual Entertainment; Turtle Rock Studios	Valve (digital); Sierra Entertainment (retail)
Far Cry	2 million	Far Cry	March 23, 2004	First-person shooter	Crytek	Ubisoft
Age of Empires III	2 million	Age of Empires	October 18, 2005	Real-time strategy	Ensemble Studios	Microsoft
Cossacks II: Napoleonic Wars	2 million	Cossacks	April 15, 2005	Real-time strategy	GSC Game World	CDV Software
Crusader Kings III	2 million	Crusader Kings	September 1, 2020	Grand strategy	Paradox Development Studio	Paradox Interactive
The 7th Guest	2 million	—N/a	April 28, 1993	Interactive movie, puzzle,adventure	Trilobyte	Virgin Interactive Entertainment
The Witcher	2 million	The Witcher	October 26, 2007	Action role-playing	CD Projekt Red	Atari
The Witcher 2: Assassins of Kings	2 million	The Witcher	May 17, 2011	Action role-playing	CD Projekt Red	CD Projekt
Spore	2 million	Spore	September 4, 2008	God game	Maxis	Electronic Arts
Gamble With Your Friends	2 million	—N/a	May 1, 2026	Cooperative game	Team Gwyf	Tenstack
SimCity	2 million	SimCity	March 5, 2013	City-building	Electronic Arts	
Battlefield 2	2.225 million	Battlefield	June 21, 2005	First-person shooter	Digital Illusions CE	Electronic Arts
7 Days to Die	2 million	7 Days	June 28, 2016	Survival horror	The Fun Pimps	
Metro 2033 Redux	2 million	Metro	August 26, 2014	First-person shooter, survival horror	4A Games	Deepsilver
Planet Coaster	2 million	—N/a	November 2016	Construction and management simulation	Frontier Developments	
Stick Fight: The Game	2 million	—N/a	September 28, 2017	Fighting	Landfall Games	
BattleBit Remastered	1.8 million	Battlebit	June 15, 2023	First-person shooter	SgtOkiDoki, Vilaskis, TheLiquidHorse	SgtOkiDoki
Diablo	1.8 million	Diablo	December 31, 1996	Action role-playing	Blizzard North	Blizzard Entertainment (North America); Ubisoft (Europe)
Tale of Immortal	1.8 million	—N/a	May 26, 2023	Management	鬼谷工作室	鬼谷工作室 Lightning Games
Metal Gear Solid V: The Phantom Pain	1.8 million	Metal Gear Solid	September 1, 2015	Action-adventure, stealth	Kojima Productions	Konami
Barbie Fashion Designer	1.75 million	—N/a	November 1996	Dress-up	Digital Domain	Mattel Media
Max Payne 3	1.74 million	May Payne	May 15, 2012	Third-person shooter	Rockstar Studios	Rockstar Games
Star Citizen	1.7 million	—N/a	August 29, 2013	MMO, space trading and combat, first-person shooter	Cloud Imperium Games	
Dungeon Siege	1.7 million	Dungeon Siege	April 5, 2002	Role-playing	Gas Powered Games	Microsoft Game Studios
Assassin's Creed IV Black Flag	1.62 million	Assassin's Creed	November 19, 2013	Action-adventure	Ubisoft Montreal	Ubisoft
L.A. Noire	1.57 million	—N/a	May 17, 2011	Action-adventure	Team Bondi	Rockstar Games
BioShock 2	1.56 million	BioShock	February 9, 2010	First-person shooter	2k Marin	2K
Railroad Tycoon II	1.5 million	Railroad Tycoon	November 4, 1998	Construction and management simulation	PopTop Software	Take-Two Interactive / Gathering of Developers
International Karate	1.5 million	International Karate	November 1985	Fighting	System 3	Epyx
Marvel's Spider-Man Remastered	1.5 million	Marvel's Spider-Man	August 12, 2022	Action-adventure	Insomniac Games	Sony Interactive Entertainment
Sega Mega Drive and Genesis Classics	1.5 million	Sega Mega Drive and Genesis Classics	June 1, 2010	Compilation	Sega	
Stellaris	1.5 million	—N/a	May 9, 2016	RTS, 4X, grand strategy	Paradox Development Studio	Paradox Interactive
PlateUp!	1.5 million	—N/a	August 4, 2019	Cooking, roguelite	It's happening	Yogscast Games, Gamersky Games
Windrose	1.5 million	—N/a	April 14, 2026	Action-adventure, survival	Kraken Express	Kraken Express; Pocketpair
Monster Hunter Wilds	1.4 million (Note: Top concurrent player count on Steam. True figure likely higher.)	Monster Hunter	February 28, 2025	Action role-playing	Capcom	
Dead Rising 3 Apocalypse Edition	1.4 million	Dead Rising	September 5, 2014	Action-adventure	Capcom Vancouver	Microsoft Studios
Frostpunk	1.4 million	Frostpunk	April 24, 2018	City-building survival	11 Bit Studios	
Age of Conan	1.4 million	—N/a	May 20, 2008	Massively multiplayer action role-playing	Funcom	Funcom Eidos Interactive
Ultra Street Fighter IV	1.3 million	Street Fighter	July 2, 2009	Fighting	Capcom; Dimps	Capcom
Battlefield Vietnam	1.36 million	Battlefield	March 14, 2004	First-person shooter	EA DICE	Electronic Arts
Riven	1.3 million	Myst	October 31, 1997	Adventure, puzzle	Cyan	Red Orb Entertainment
Resident Evil 6	1.3 million	Resident Evil	March 21, 2013	Third-person shooter, survival horror	Capcom	
Gujian 3	1.3 million	Gujian	December 14, 2018	Action role-playing	Aurogon	Wangyuan Shengtang
Lost Ark	1.3 million	—N/a	December 4, 2019	Massively multiplayer action role-playing	Tripod Studio Smilegate	Amazon Games Smilegate
BioShock Remastered	1.28 million	BioShock	September 15, 2016	First-person shooter	2K Boston 2K Australia Blind Squirrel Feral Interactive (Mac)	2K Feral Interactive (Mac)
FEZ	1.28 million	—N/a	May 1, 2013	Puzzle-platform	Polytron Corporation	Trapdoor
Monopoly	1.27 million	Monopoly	September 1995	Strategy, board game	Westwood Studios	Hasbro Electronic Entertainment
Against the Storm	1.2 million	—N/a	December 8, 2018	City-building	Eremite Games	Hooded Horse
Nier: Automata	1.2 million	Nier	March 17, 2017	Action role-playing, hack and slash	PlatinumGames Square Enix	Square Enix
SimCity 2000	1.13 million	SimCity	December 1993	City-building	Maxis	Maxis
Pac-Man Championship Edition DX+	1.1 million	Pac-Man	September 25, 2013	Maze, arcade	Namco Bandai Games; Mine Loader Software	Namco Bandai Games
To the Moon	1.09 million	—N/a	November 1, 2011	Adventure	Freebird Games	
Brothers: A Tale of Two Sons	1.06 million	—N/a	September 3, 2013	Adventure	Starbreeze Studios	505 Games
The Walking Dead: Season Two	1.05 million	The Walking Dead	2013	Adventure	Telltale Games	
Hotline Miami 2: Wrong Number	1.04 million	Hotline Miami	March 10, 2015	Top-down shooter	Dennaton Games Abstraction Games	Devolver Digital
The Wolf Among Us	1.01 million	The Wolf Among Us	2013	Adventure	Telltale Games	
Braid	1.01 million	—N/a	April 10, 2009	Puzzle-platformer	Number None	
Assassin's Creed Origins	1 million	Assassin's Creed	October 27, 2017	Action role-playing	Ubisoft Montreal	Ubisoft
BlazBlue Entropy Effect	1 million	BlazBlue	February 14, 2024	Action, roguelike	91Act	
Hydlide	1 million	Hydlide	December 13, 1984	Action role-playing	Technology and Entertainment Software	
Creatures	1 million	Creatures	November 1996	Artificial life	Creature Labs; Elo Interactive (GBA)	Warner Interactive Europe (Europe); Mindscape (North America)
Big G All-Stars vs. Major League Baseball	1 million	—N/a	1998	Baseball	(Hypnotix?)	General Mills
Mewgenics	1 million	—N/a	February 10, 2026	Tactical role-playing Roguelike Life simulation	Edmund McMillien Tyler Glaeil	
Tetris	1 million	Tetris	January 1988	Puzzle	Spectrum HoloByte	
Hollow Knight	1 million	—N/a	February 24, 2017	Metroidvania	Team Cherry	
Barony	1 million	—N/a	June 23, 2015	Multiplayer roguelike	Turning Wheel LLC	
RoboCop	1 million	RoboCop	December 1988	Run and gun	Data East	Data East, Ocean Software
Return to Zork	1 million	Zork	August 20, 1993	Adventure	Infocom	Activision
Star Wars: Rebel Assault	1 million	Star Wars	November 1993	Rail shooter	LucasArts	
Star Wars Galaxies	1 million	Star Wars	June 26, 2003	Massively multiplayer action role-playing	Sony Online Entertainment	LucasArts
The Mean Greens	1 million	—N/a	December 8, 2015	Third-person shooter	Virtual Basement LLC, Code Headquarter LLC	Virtual Basement LLC
Necesse	1 million	—N/a	December 12, 2019	Sandbox, action-adventure,exploration	Fair Games ApS	
Soma	1 million	—N/a	September 22, 2015	Survival horror	Frictional Games	
Wing Commander 3: Heart of the Tiger	1 million	Wing Commander	December 1994	Space combat simulation	Origin Systems	Electronic Arts
Hero's Adventure	1 million	—N/a	November 15, 2023	Role-playing game	Half Amateur Studio	XD
Paralives	1 million	—N/a	May 25, 2026	Life simulation	Paralives studio	
Full Throttle	1 million	—N/a	April 30, 1995	Graphic adventure	LucasArts	
Celtic Kings: Rage of War	1 million	—N/a	August 19, 2002	Real-time strategy	Haemimont Games	Strategy First (NA) Wanadoo Edition (FRA)
MIMESIS	1 million	—N/a	October 27, 2025	Co-op survival horror	ReLU Games, Inc.	ReLU Games, Inc. KRAFTON, Inc.
HyperBlade	1 million	—N/a	November 1, 1996	Action sports	Wzigbang! Software Productions	Activision
Phantasmagoria	1 million	Phantasmagoria	July 31, 1995	Interactive movie	Sierra On-Line	
Daryl F. Gates' Police Quest: SWAT	1 million	Police Quest	November 1995	Interactive movie	Sierra On-Line	
Duke Nukem 3D	1 million	Duke Nukem	January 29, 1996	First-person shooter	3D Realms	GT Interactive
Fresh Women	1 million	—N/a	August 19, 2022	Pornographic	OppaiMan	
Civilization II	1 million	Civilization	February 29, 1996	Turn-based strategy, 4X	MicroProse	
A Game About Digging A Hole	1 million	—N/a	February 7, 2025	Simulation	Cyberwave	rokaplay Boutique Drillhounds
Quake	1 million	Quake	June 22, 1996	First-person shooter	id Software	GT Interactive
Quake II	1 million	Quake	December 9, 1997	First-person shooter	id Software	Activision
Chuck Yeager's Advanced Flight Trainer	1 million	—N/a	1987	Flight simulation	Lerner Research	Electronic Arts
Chivalry : Medieval Warfare	1 million	Chivalry	October 16, 2012	Hack and slash	Torn Banner Studios	
Grand Prix 2	1 million	Grand Prix	August 30, 1996	Sim racing	MicroProse	MicroProse
Coral Island	1 million	—N/a	November 14, 2023	Farm simulation	Stairway Games	Humble Games
Dwarf Fortress	1 million (Note: Steam sales only. Itch.io sales and free downloads not included.)	—N/a	December 6, 2022 (Note: The public alpha was released for free on August 8, 2006; but the paid version on Steam and Itch.io was released on December 6, 2022)	Construction and management simulation	Bay 12 Games	Bay 12 Games Kitfox Games (Itch.io and Steam)
Hydroneer	1 million	—N/a	May 8, 2020	Construction and management simulation	Foulball Hangover	
Angels of Death	1 million	—N/a	August 14, 2015	Horror, adventure	Hoshikuzu KRNKRN	Den Fami Nico Game Magazine
Total Annihilation	1 million	Total Annihilation	September 30, 1997	Real-time strategy	Cavedog Entertainment	GT Interactive
Frogger: He's Back!	1 million	Frogger	November 3, 1997	Action	Sony Computer Entertainment Europe	Hasbro Interactive
Don't Starve	1 million	Don't Starve	April 23, 2013	Survival	Klei Entertainment	
Deer Hunter II: The Hunt Continues	1 million	Deer Hunter	October 31, 1998	Sports	Sunstorm Interactive	WizardWorks
Deer Hunter 3: The Legend Continues	1 million	Deer Hunter	October 1, 1999	Sports	Sunstorm Interactive	WizardWorks
Blade Runner	1 million	—N/a	November 21, 1997	Point-and-click	Westwood Studios	Virgin Interactive
Unreal	1 million	Unreal	May 22, 1998	First-person shooter	Epic Games; Digital Extremes	GT Interactive
Unreal Tournament	1 million	Unreal	November 30, 1999	First-person shooter	Epic Games; Digital Extremes	GT Interactive
Commandos: Behind Enemy Lines	1 million	Commandos	June 24, 1998	Real-time tactics	Pyro Studios	Eidos Interactive
InZOI	1 million	—N/a	March 28, 2025	Life simulation	InZOI Studio	Krafton
Dave the Diver	1 million	—N/a	August 28, 2023	Adventure	Mintrocket	Mintrocket; Arc System Works (Anniversary Edition)
Move or Die	1 million	—N/a	January 21, 2016	Multiplayer party platformer	Those Awesome Guys	
Stellar Blade	1 million	—N/a	June 11, 2025	Action-adventure	Shift Up	Sony Interactive Entertainment
Hidden & Dangerous	1 million	Hidden & Dangerous	July 29, 1999	Action	Illusion Softworks	Take-Two Interactive
Rimworld	1 million (Note: Sales preceding official Steam release)	—N/a	October 17, 2018 (Note: The game was first officially released on October 17, 2018, on steam (labelled as the "1.0 release"). However, between November 4, 2013, and October 17, 2018, it was publicly sold on Ludeon Studio's website as an open pre-alpha/alpha/beta.)	Construction and management simulation	Ludeon Studios	
The Planet Crafter	1 million	—N/a	10 April 2024 (Note: Early access released in March 2022, but full release in April 2024)	Survival	Miju Games	
Brotato	1 million	—N/a	June 23, 2023	Shoot 'em up, roguelike	Thomas Gervraud Evil Empire	Blobfish
Who Wants to Be a Millionaire?	1 million	—N/a	November 28, 1999	Trivia	Jellyvision	Disney Interactive
Elite	1 million	—N/a	September 20, 1984	Space trading	David Braben; Ian Bell	Acornsoft (Acorn/BBC); Firebird (ports); Imagineer
Loop Hero	1 million	—N/a	March 4, 2021	Roguelike	Four Quarters	Devolver Digital
American McGee's Alice	1 million	Alice	October 6, 2000	Action-adventure, platformer	Rogue Entertainment	Electronic Arts
Command & Conquer: Red Alert 2	1 million	Command & Conquer	October 23, 2000	Real-time strategy	Westwood Pacific	Electronic Arts
Depth	1 million	—N/a	November 3, 2014	First-person shooter	Digital Confectioners	
Tropico	1 million	Tropico	April 24, 2001	Construction and management simulation	PopTop Software	Gathering of Developers
Operation Flashpoint: Cold War Crisis	1 million	—N/a	June 22, 2001	Tactical shooter	Bohemia Interactive Studio	Codemasters
Rocket League	1 million	—N/a	July 7, 2015	Sports	Psyonix	
Black Myth: Wukong	1 million	—N/a	August 20, 2024	Action role-playing	Game Science	
Runaway: A Road Adventure	1 million	Runaway	July 6, 2001	Adventure	Péndulo Studios, S.L.	Dinamic Multimedia
Zoo Tycoon	1 million	Zoo Tycoon	October 17, 2001	Business simulation	Microsoft	Blue Fang Games
Aion	1 million	—N/a	October 17, 2001	Massively multiplayer online role-playing	NCSoft	
Stronghold	1 million	Stronghold	October 19, 2001	Real-time strategy	Firefly Studios	Take-Two Interactive / Gathering of Developers
Empire Earth	1 million	Empire Earth	November 12, 2001	Real-time strategy	Stainless Steel Studios	Sierra Entertainment
Dome Keeper	1 million	—N/a	September 27, 2022	Tower defense	Bippinbits	Raw Fury
Harry Potter and the Philosopher's Stone	1 million	Harry Potter	November 15, 2001	Action-adventure	KnowWonder	Electronic Arts
Slay the Spire	1 million	—N/a	January 23, 2019 (Note: Early access release in November 2017)	Roguelike deck-building	Mega Crit	
Dune: Awakening	1 million	—N/a	June 10, 2025	Survival	Funcom	
Return to Castle Wolfenstein	1 million	Wolfenstein	November 19, 2001	First-person shooter	Gray Matter Studios id Software	Activision
Gunfire Reborn	1 million	—N/a	May 22, 2020	Roguelite, first-person shooter	Duoyi Games	
Among Us 3D: VR	1 million	Among Us	November 10, 2022	Social deduction	Schell Games, Innersloth, Robot Teddy	Innersloth
Escape Simulator	1 million	—N/a	October 19, 2021	Puzzle	Pine studio	
Persona 4 Golden	1 million	Persona	August 13, 2020	Role-playing	Atlus	Sega
Contraband Police	1 million	—N/a	March 8, 2023	Simulation	Crazy Rocks Studios	PlayWay
Hotel Giant	1 million	—N/a	May 17, 2002	Business simulation	Enlight Software	JoWooD Productions
Age of Mythology	1 million	Age of Empires	October 30, 2002	Real-time strategy	Ensemble Studios	Microsoft
Vietcong	1 million	Vietcong	March 26, 2003	Tactical shooter	Pterodon; Illusion Softworks	Gathering of Developers
The Legend of Sword and Fairy 3	1 million	The Legend of Sword and Fairy	July 31, 2003	Role-playing	Softstar Entertainment	Softstar Entertainment; Unistar
Anno 2070	1 million	Anno	November 17, 2011	City-builder,economic simulation	Related Designs Blue Byte	Ubisoft
Hidden & Dangerous 2	1 million	Hidden & Dangerous	October 21, 2003	Action	Illusion Softworks	Take-Two Interactive
Patrician III: Rise of the Hanse	1 million	The Patrician	October 24, 2003	Business simulation	Ascaron	Encore
Sacred	1 million	Sacred	March 23, 2004	Action role-playing	Ascaron	Encore; Koch Media; Red Ant Enterprises
CloverPit	1 million	—N/a	September 25, 2025	Horror, rogue-lite	Panik Arcade	Future Friends Game
Inscryption	1 million	—N/a	October 19, 2021	Roguelike, deck-building	Daniel Mullins Games	Devolver Digital
Rome: Total War	1 million	Total War	September 22, 2004	Real-time strategy	The Creative Assembly	Activision
Psychonauts	1 million	Psychonauts	April 19, 2005	Platform	Double Fine Productions	THQ
Dungeon Lords	1 million	—N/a	May 5, 2005	Role-playing	Heuristic Park	DreamCatcher Interactive
Imperivm: Great Battles of Rome	1 million	—N/a	May 10, 2005	Real-time strategy	Haemimont Games	FX Interactive
Glory of the Roman Empire	1 million	—N/a	June 26, 2006	City-building	Haemimont Games	CDV Software
Microsoft Flight Simulator X	1 million	Microsoft Flight Simulator	October 17, 2006	Amateur flight simulation	Microsoft Game Studios	
Thexder	1 million	Thexder	April 1985	Run and gun	Game Arts	
F-15 Strike Eagle	1 million	F-15 Strike Eagle	1984	Combat flight simulation game	MicroProse; NMS Software (Thomson)	Microprose; FIL (Thomson)
The Scroll of Taiwu	1 million	—N/a	September 20, 2018	Role-playing	ConchShip Games	
Metro 2033	1 million	Metro	March 16, 2010	First-person shooter, survival horror	4A Games	THQ; Deep Silver (Redux)
Supreme Commander	1 million	Total Annihilation	February 16, 2007	Real-time strategy	Gas Powered Games	THQ
Scum	1 million	—N/a	June 17, 2025	Survival	Gamepires	
Command & Conquer 3: Tiberium Wars	1 million	Command & Conquer	March 28, 2007	Real-time strategy	EA Los Angeles	Electronic Arts
BioShock	1 million	BioShock	August 21, 2007	First-person shooter	Irrational Games	2K Games
The Murder of Sonic the Hedgehog	1 million	Sonic the Hedgehog	March 31, 2023	Point-and-click, visual novel	Sega Social Team	Sega
Crysis Warhead	1 million	Crysis	September 16, 2008	First-person shooter	Crytek Budapest	Electronic Arts
Sultan's Game	1 million	—N/a	March 30, 2025	Role-playing	Double Cross	2P Games
Grim Dawn	1 million	—N/a	February 25, 2016	Action role-playing	Crate Entertainment	
Green Hell	1 million	—N/a	September 5, 2019	Survival	Creepy Jar	
Warhammer Online: Age of Reckoning	1 million	Warhammer	September 18, 2008	Massively multiplayer action role-playing	Mythic Entertainment	Electronic Arts
Torchlight II	2 million	Torchlight	September 20, 2012	Action role-playing, dungeon crawler	Runic Games	
Killing Floor	1 million	—N/a	May 14, 2009	First-person shooter	Tripwire Interactive	
Resident Evil 5	1 million	Resident Evil	September 17, 2009	Third-person shooter, survival horror	Capcom	Capcom
Machinarium	1 million	—N/a	October 16, 2009	Graphic adventure, puzzle	Amanita Design	
Megabonk	1 million	—N/a	September 18, 2025	Roguelike	vedinad	
The Legend of Sword and Fairy 5	1 million	The Legend of Sword and Fairy	July 7, 2011	Role-playing	Softstar	
Crusader Kings II	1 million	Crusader Kings	February 14, 2012	Grand strategy	Paradox Development Studio	Paradox Interactive
StarCraft II: Heart of the Swarm	1 million	StarCraft	March 12, 2013	Real-time strategy	Blizzard Entertainment	
Europa Universalis IV	1 million	Europa Universalis	August 13, 2013	Grand strategy	Paradox Development Studio	Paradox Interactive
The Stanley Parable	1 million	—N/a	October 17, 2013	Interactive fiction	Galactic Cafe	
Just Survive (Note: Sold a million copies under the name of H1Z1 while in early access. Not to be confused with the H1Z1 battle royale game by the same company.)	1 million	—N/a	January 15, 2015	Survival	Daybreak Game Company	
Ark: Survival Evolved	1 million	Ark: Survival Evolved	June 2, 2015	Action-adventure, survival	Studio Wildcard; Instinct Games	Studio Wildcard
Lego Island	1 million	Lego Island	September 26, 1997	Action-adventure	Mindscape	
StarCraft II: Legacy of the Void	1 million	StarCraft	November 10, 2015	Real-time strategy	Blizzard Entertainment	
Danganronpa: Trigger Happy Havoc	1 million	Danganronpa	February 18, 2016	Visual novel, adventure	Spike Chunsoft	
Danganronpa 2: Goodbye Despair	1 million	Danganronpa	April 18, 2016	Visual novel, adventure	Spike Chunsoft	
Hearts of Iron IV	1 million	Hearts of Iron	June 6, 2016	Real-time strategy, grand strategy wargame	Paradox Development Studio	Paradox Interactive
No Rest for the Wicked	1 million	—N/a	April 18, 2024	Action role-playing	Moon Studios	
Divinity: Original Sin II	1 million	Divinity	September 14, 2017	Role-playing	Larian Studios	
Cuphead	1 million	—N/a	September 29, 2017	Run and gun	StudioMDHR	
Mordhau	1 million	—N/a	April 29, 2019	Action	Triternion	

== See also ==
- List of PC games
- List of best-selling video games
