= TEMSA =

Turkish vehicle manufacturer

TEMSA Skoda Sabancı Ulaşım Araçları A.Ş.
- Industry: Automotive
- Founded: 1968
- Headquarters: Adana, Turkey
- Number of locations: Adana (Turkey); Istanbul (Turkey); Mechelen (Belgium); Budapest (Hungary); Warsaw (Poland) and 45 other countries
- Area served: Worldwide
- Products: Buses and Coaches
- Revenue: 353 million USD (2023)
- Parent: Sabancı Holding (50%) and Škoda Transportation (50%)
- Website: temsa.com

TEMSA Skoda Sabancı Ulaşım Araçları A.Ş., better known as Temsa is a Turkish manufacturer of buses, midibuses, and light-trucks. As of 2020, it is operating under the partnership of Sabancı Holding and PPF Group (Škoda Transportation).

At the TEMSA Adana plant, which is established on an area of 500,000 m², a total of 11,500 vehicles are produced annually, including 4,000 buses, midibuses, and 7,500 light trucks, with 1,850 employees.

TEMSA's Avenue, Diamond, Opalin, Safari HD and Tourmalin IC buses were included in a special edition of Bus Driver (video game), made by SCS Software in 2007.

== History ==
1994-2009 logo

TEMSA (Termo-Mekanik Sanayi ve Ticaret A.Ş./ Thermo-mechanics Industry and Trade Incorporated) was founded in 1968 by Sabancı Holding to supply steel to the construction industry. Manufacturing of coaches began in 1984 with licensing and distribution agreements from Mitsubishi Motors. Service bus products were introduced in 1987.

The products have their own bodywork and include Mitsubishi Fuso, MAN, DAF, Cummins and Caterpillar engines and parts that meet the European emission standards (Euro4, Euro5).

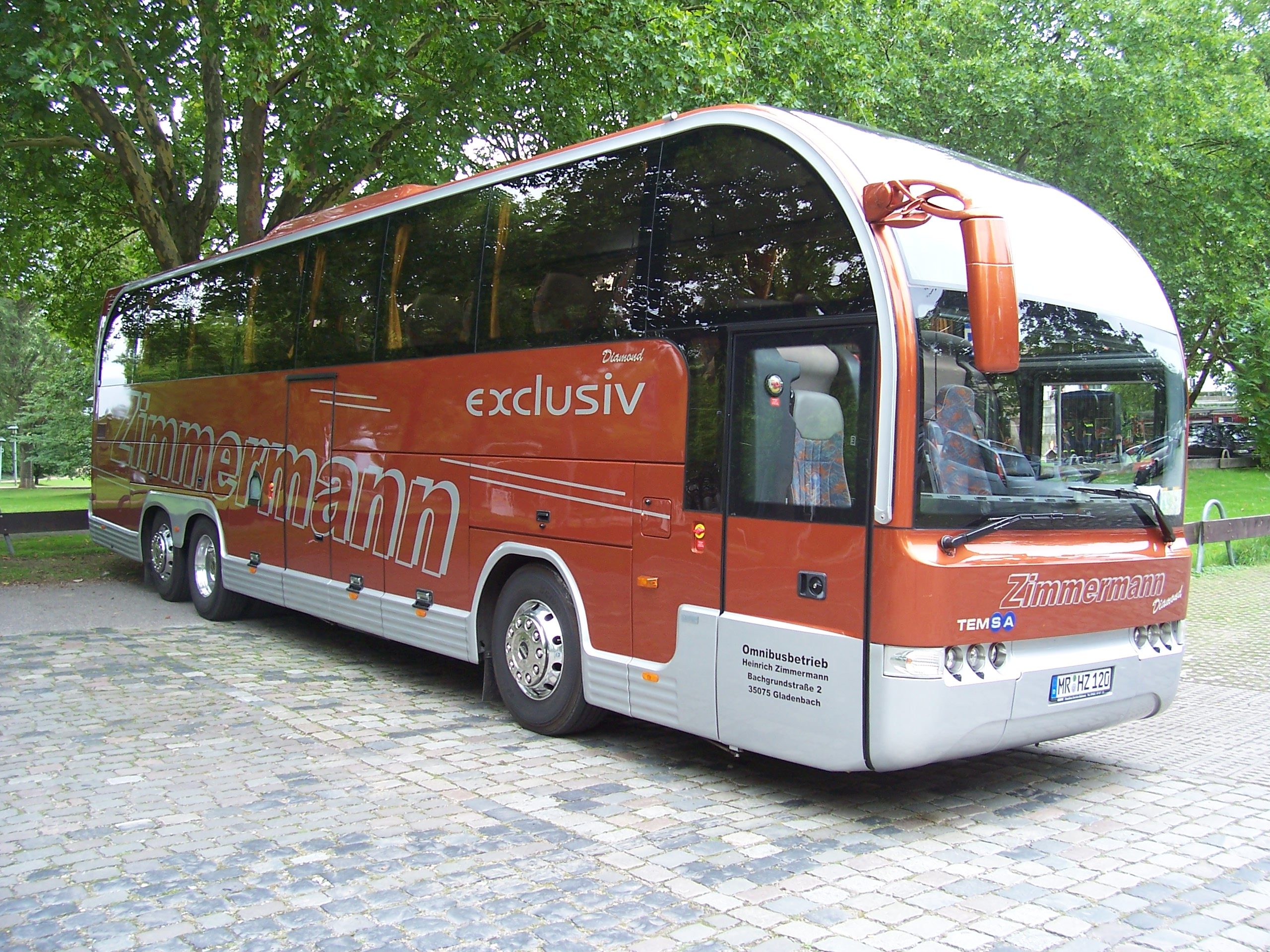
TEMSA Diamond in Mannheim, Germany

Since 2000, a full range of coaches has been developed for Western European markets, utilizing MAN engines and axles and ZF transmissions. TEMSA became independent and flexible in using different engines with its own developments and started carrying out tailor-made production. A subsidiary, TEMSA Europe, has been established in Belgium and several rep offices have been established in 46 countries (including Germany, France, Italy and Spain), under the management of Temsa Europe. Temsa has obtained over 7% of market share in its segment in Europe. Of the 1000 buses produced every year, 75% are exported.

Temsa is represented by three models in the US. The TS 30, TS 35 and TS 45 are motor coaches of 30, 35 and 45 ft respectively.

TEMSA AR-GE ve Teknoloji Merkezi (Temsa Research & Development Center) is a branch of TEMSA that is responsible for new vehicle production and technology development. In June 2019, TEMSA was purchased by True Value Capital Partners of Switzerland. In February 2020, Sabanci Holdings and Škoda Transportation have agreed and signed a letter of intent to become the new joint owners of Temsa.

== Product line as of May 2016 ==
Temsa main markets are divided as Turkish (domestic), Europe, USA and Non-Europe. Most domestic vehicles from Temsa are sold in export markets with or without domestic model names as well.

=== Domestic market (Turkey) ===
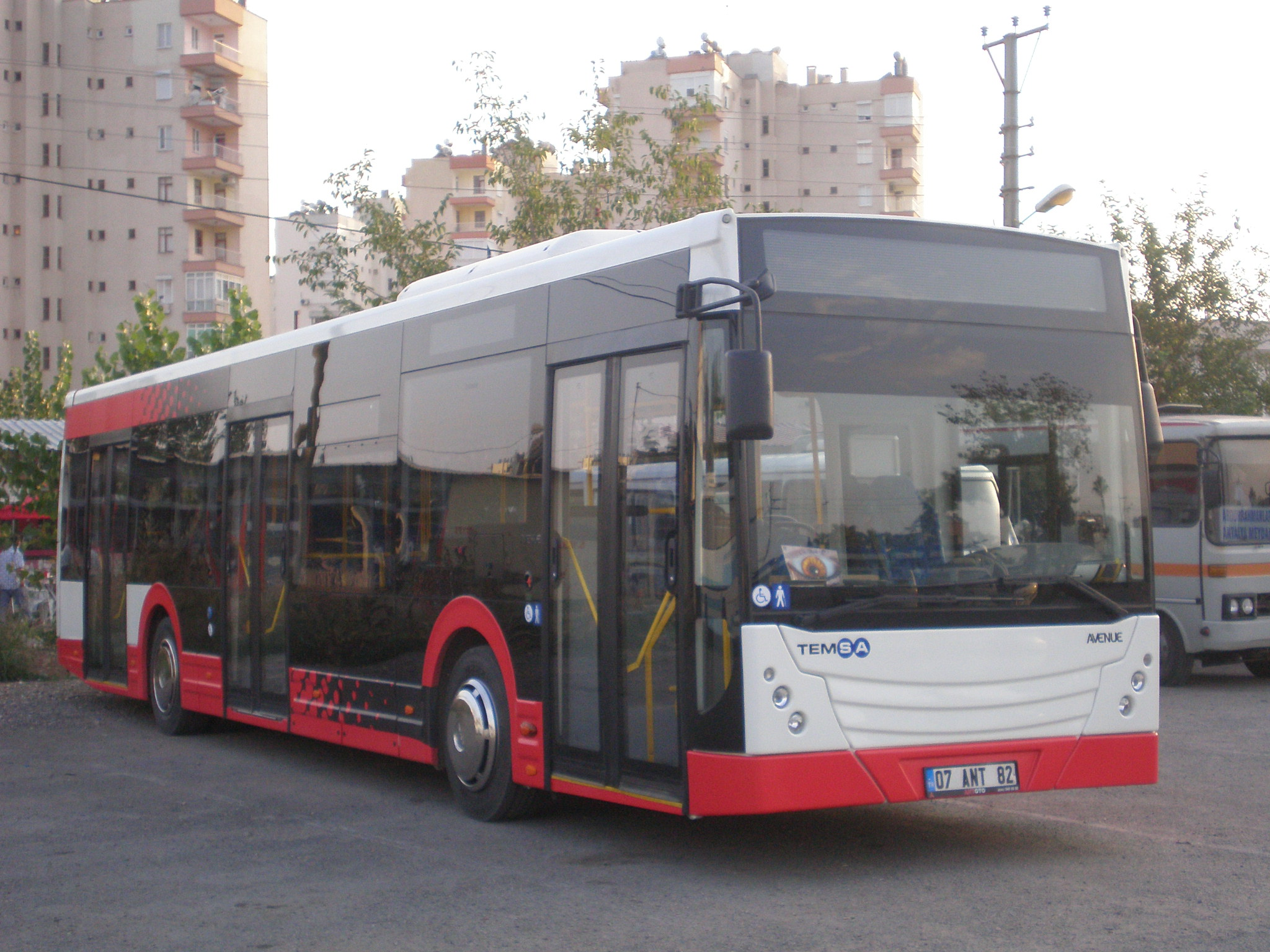
TEMSA Avenue in Antalya, Turkey

Coach

- Temsa Maraton
- Temsa Safir Plus

Midi Coach

- Temsa Opalin (either HD or Oradea)
- Temsa Prestij SX

s Inter City

- Temsa LD SB Plus
- Temsa MD9 LE

City

- Temsa Avenue LF
- Temsa Avenue LF CNG
- Temsa Avenue Electron
- Temsa Avenue EV
- Temsa MD9 ElectriCITY
- Temsa Prestij City SX

Van

- Temsa Maxus (licensed Maxus V80)

=== Export markets ===
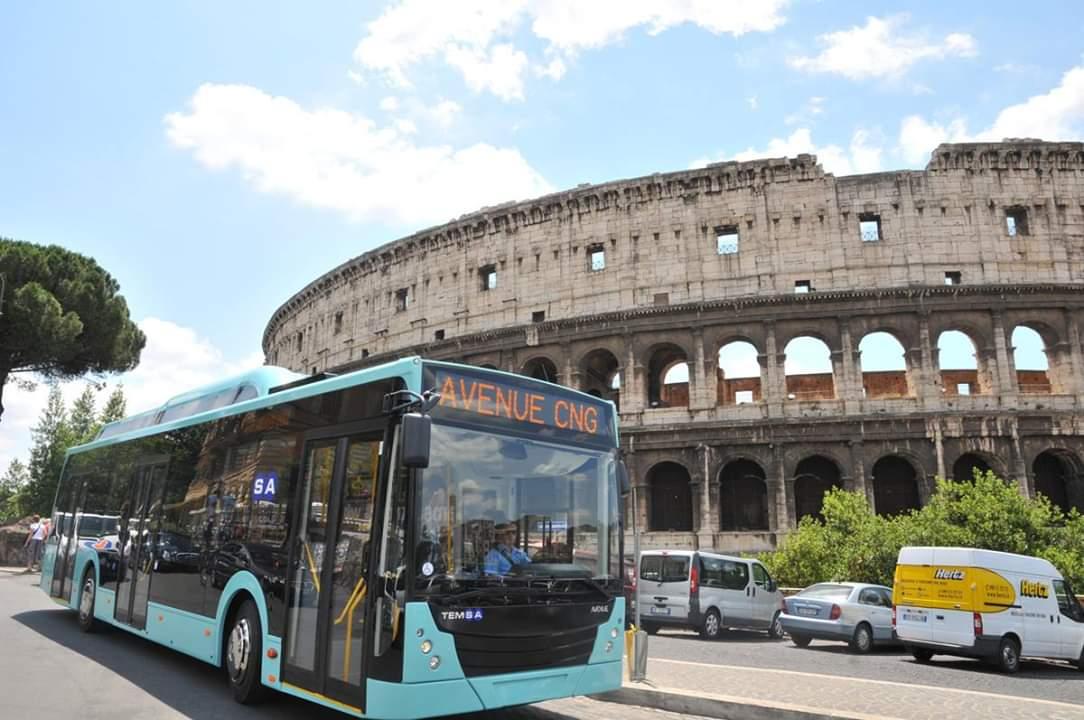
Temsa Avenue in Rome, Italy

Coach

- Temsa TS45
- Temsa Maraton
- Temsa HD
- Temsa HD RHD
- Temsa HD C12
- Temsa LD
- Temsa TS35

Midi Coach

- Temsa TS30
- Temsa MD9
- Temsa MD9 RHD
- Temsa MD7 Plus
- Temsa Prestij SX

Inter City

- Temsa LD SB Plus
- Temsa MD9 LE

City

- Temsa LF12
- Temsa LF12 CNG
- Temsa Avenue Electron
- Temsa LF EV
- Temsa MD9 ElectriCITY

=== Light truck ===
- Mitsubishi Fuso Canter (1988 - )

== Gallery ==
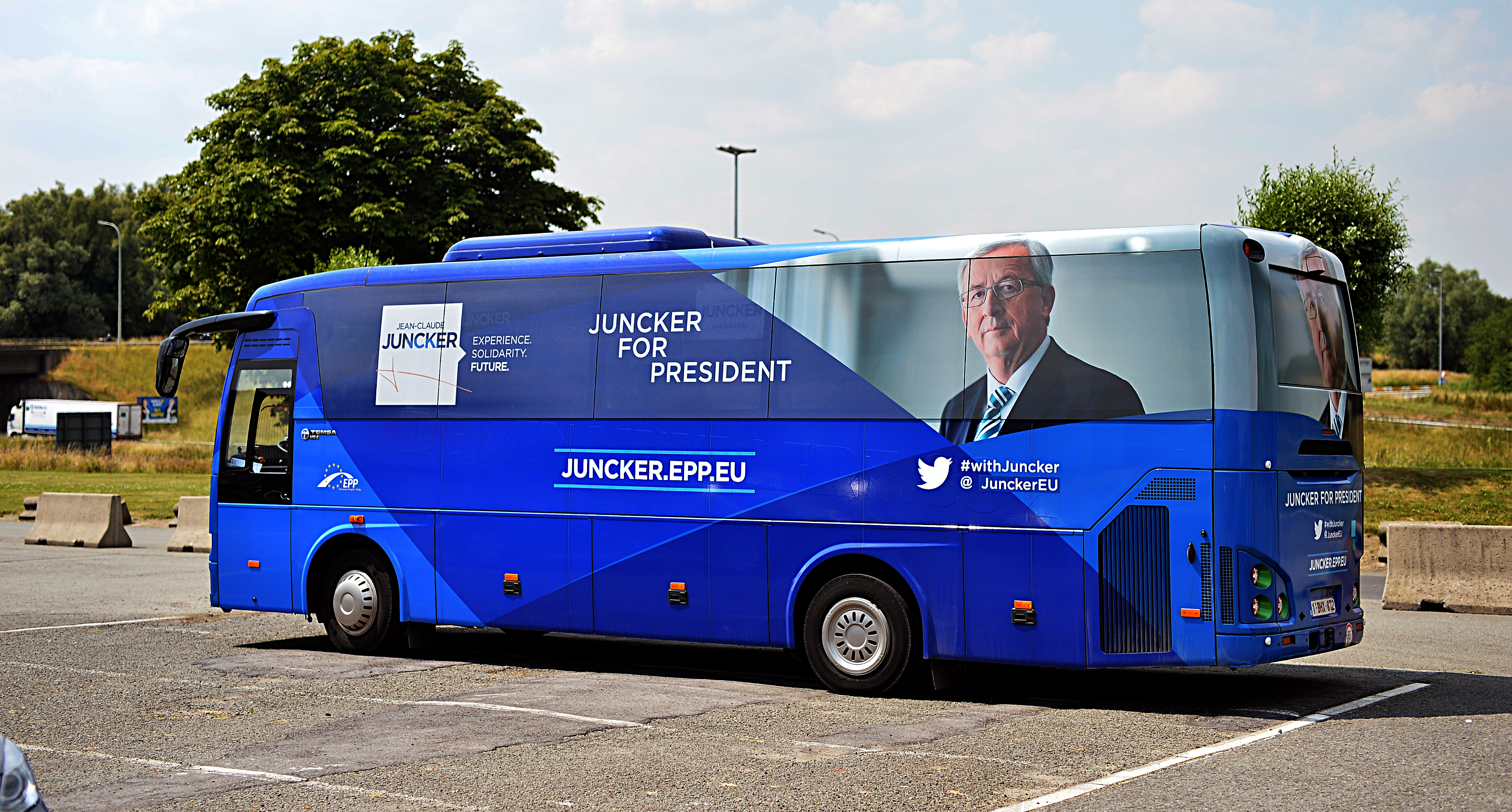
Bus of Jean-Claude Juncker in 2014

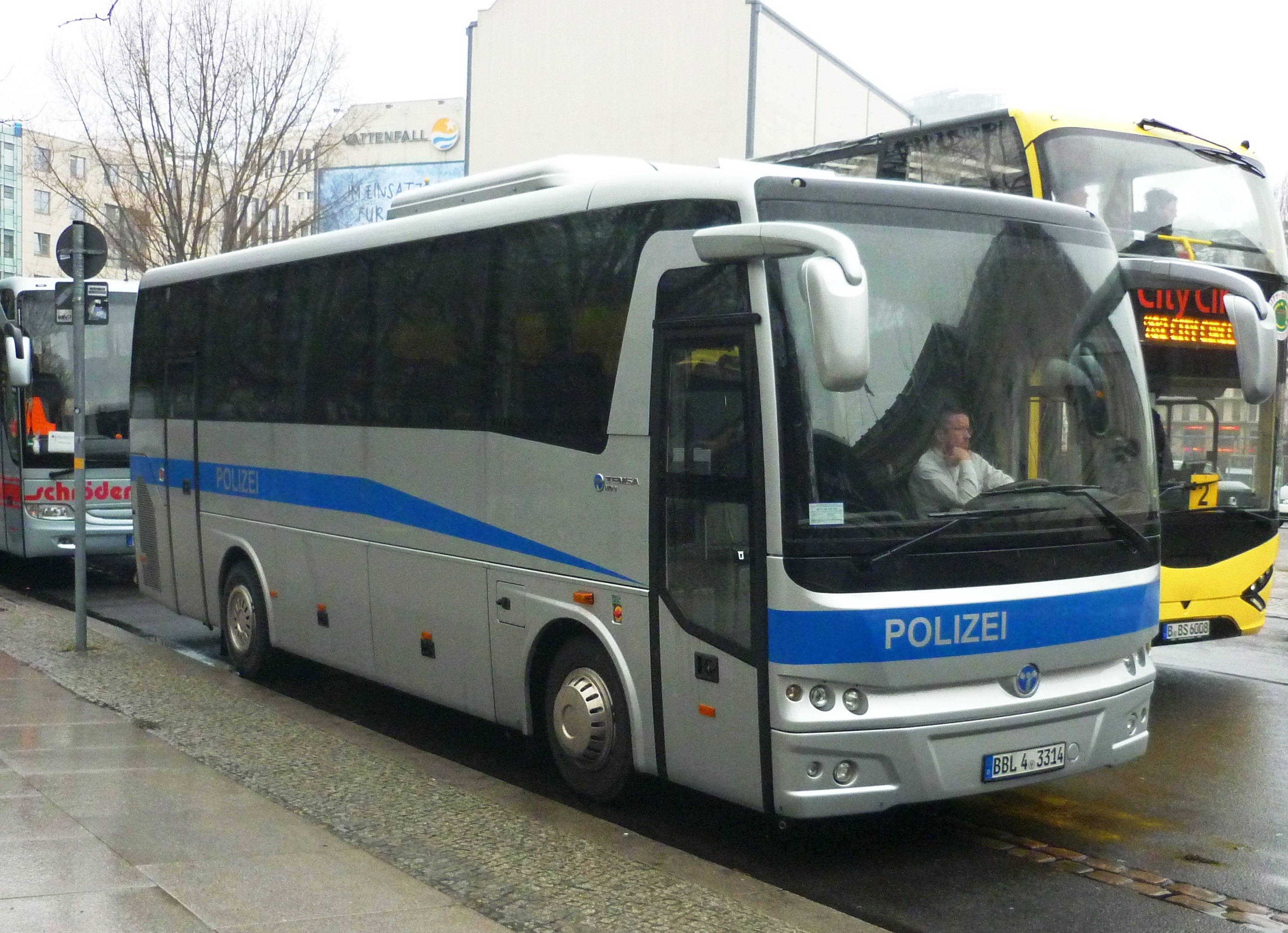
Temsa used as a Police bus

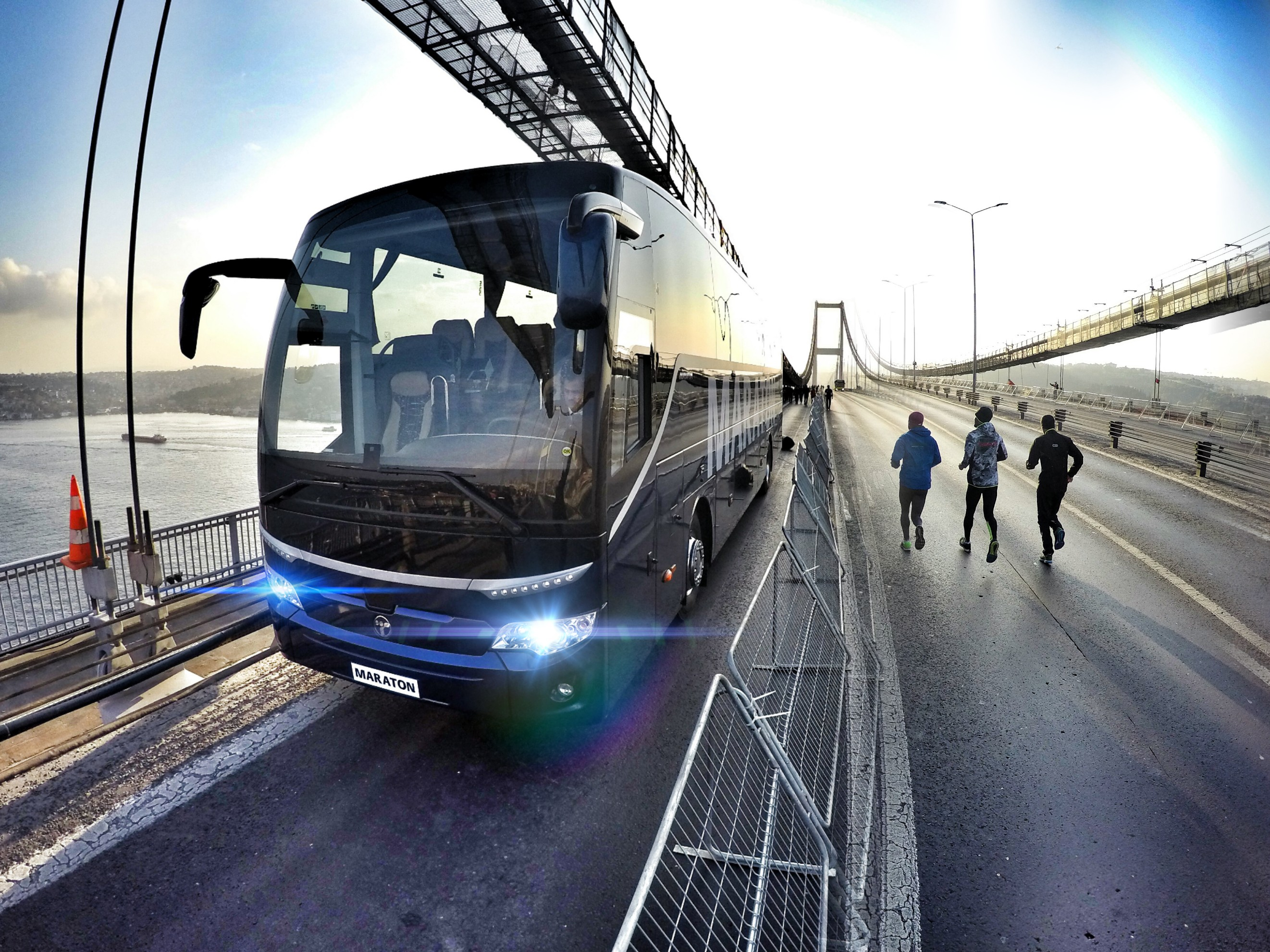
Temsa Maraton on Istanbul Bogazici Bridge

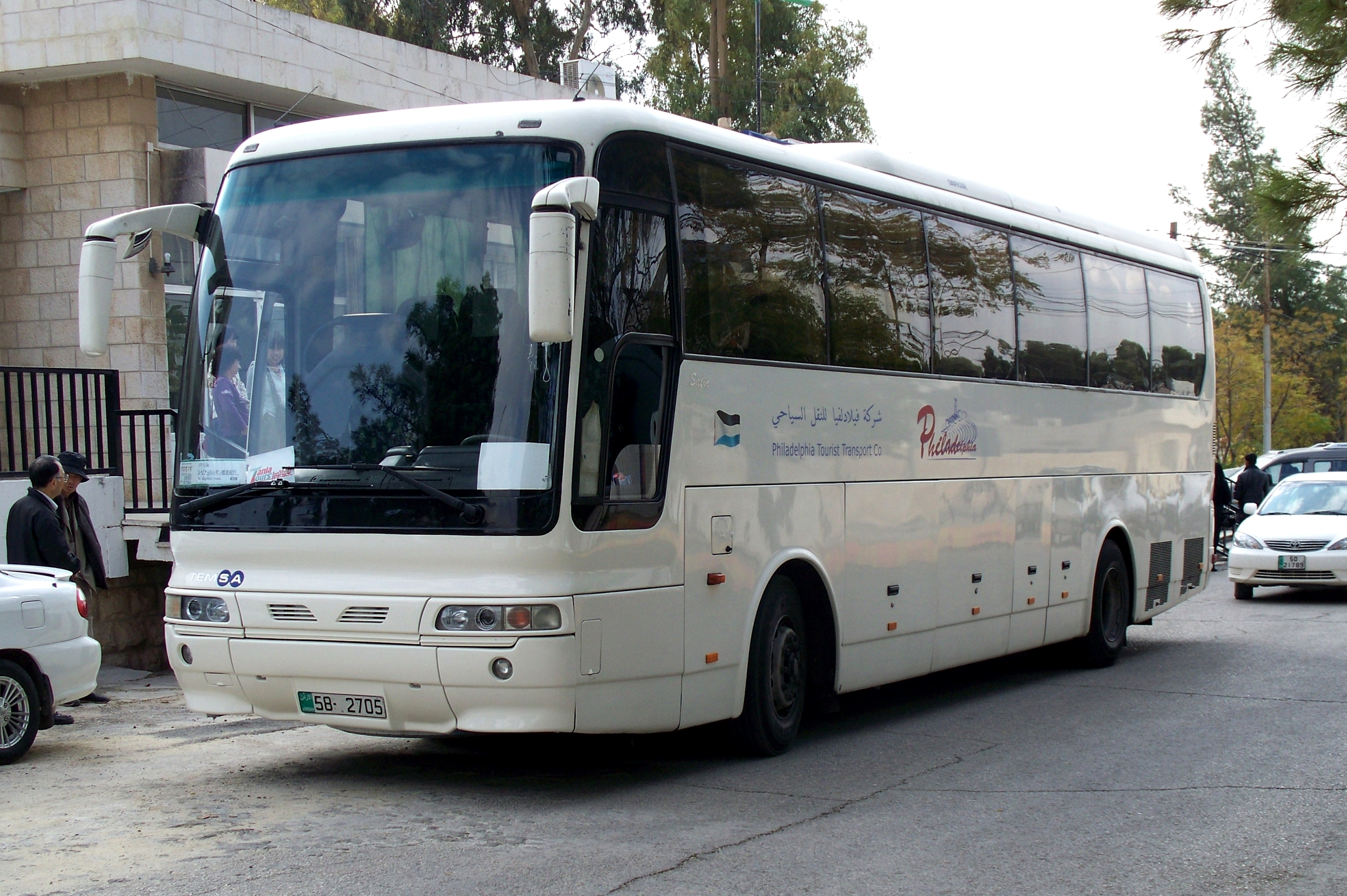
TEMSA Safir in Jordan

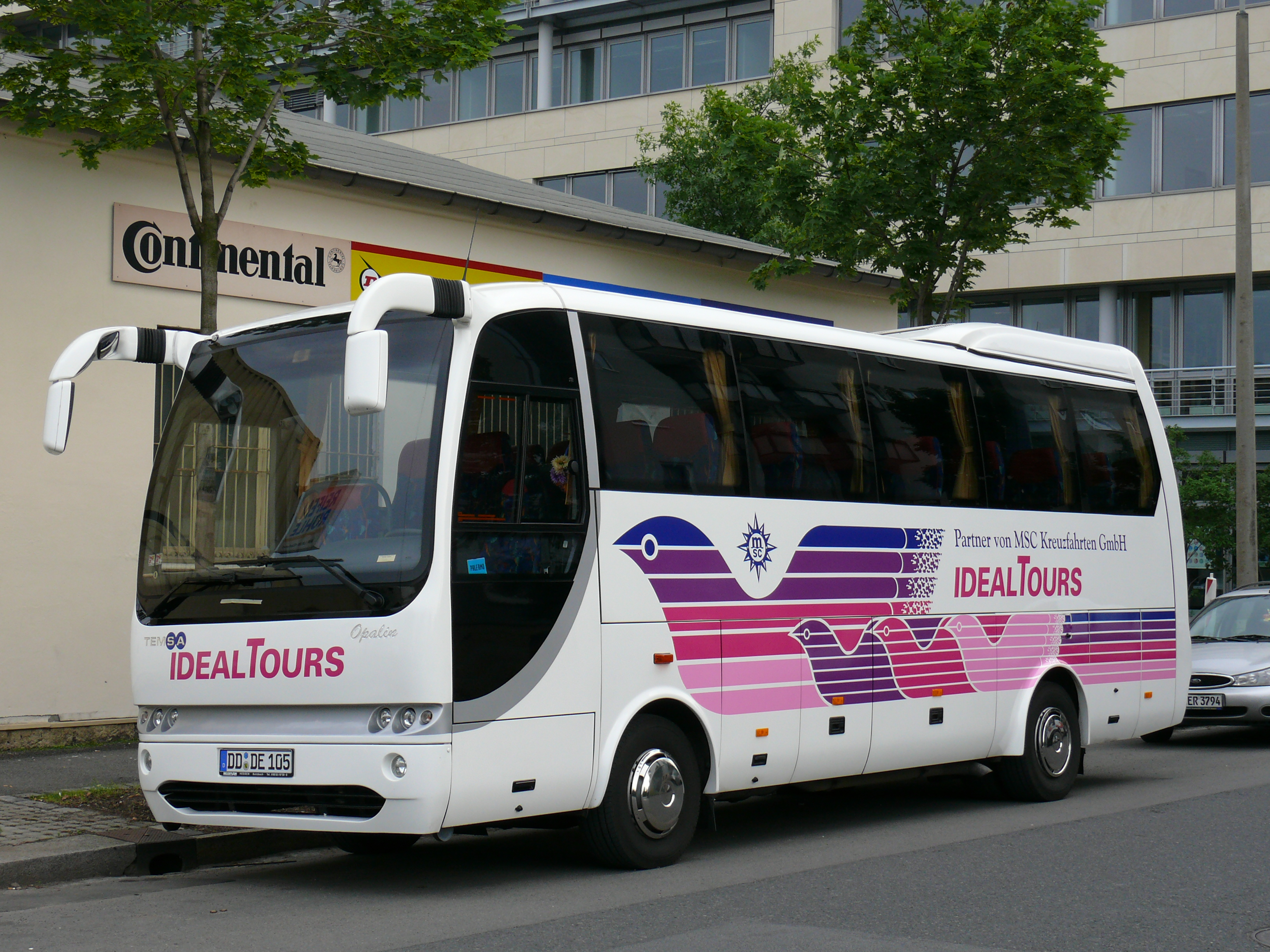
TEMSA Opalin in Dresden, Germany

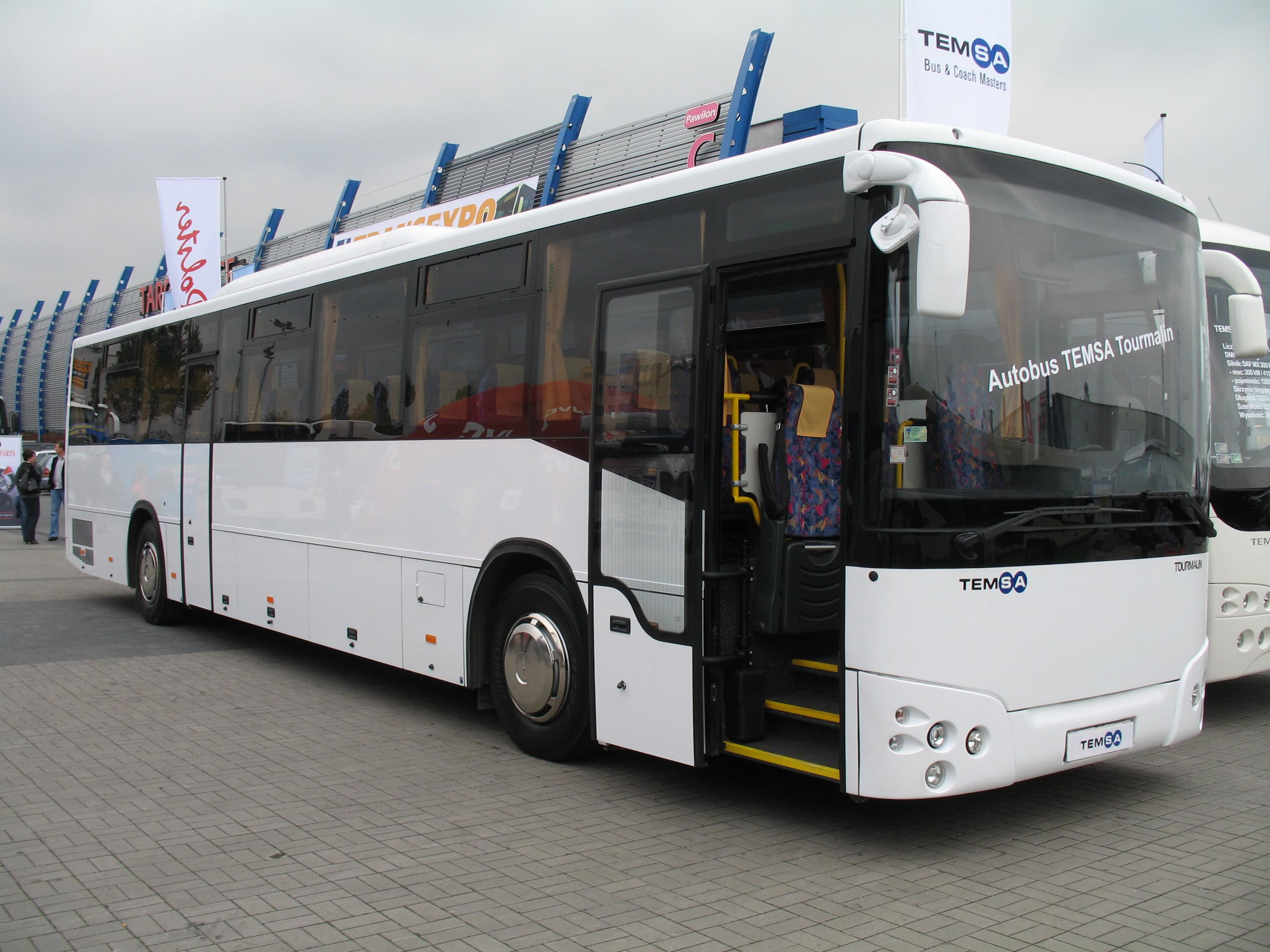
TEMSA Tourmalin in Kielce, Poland

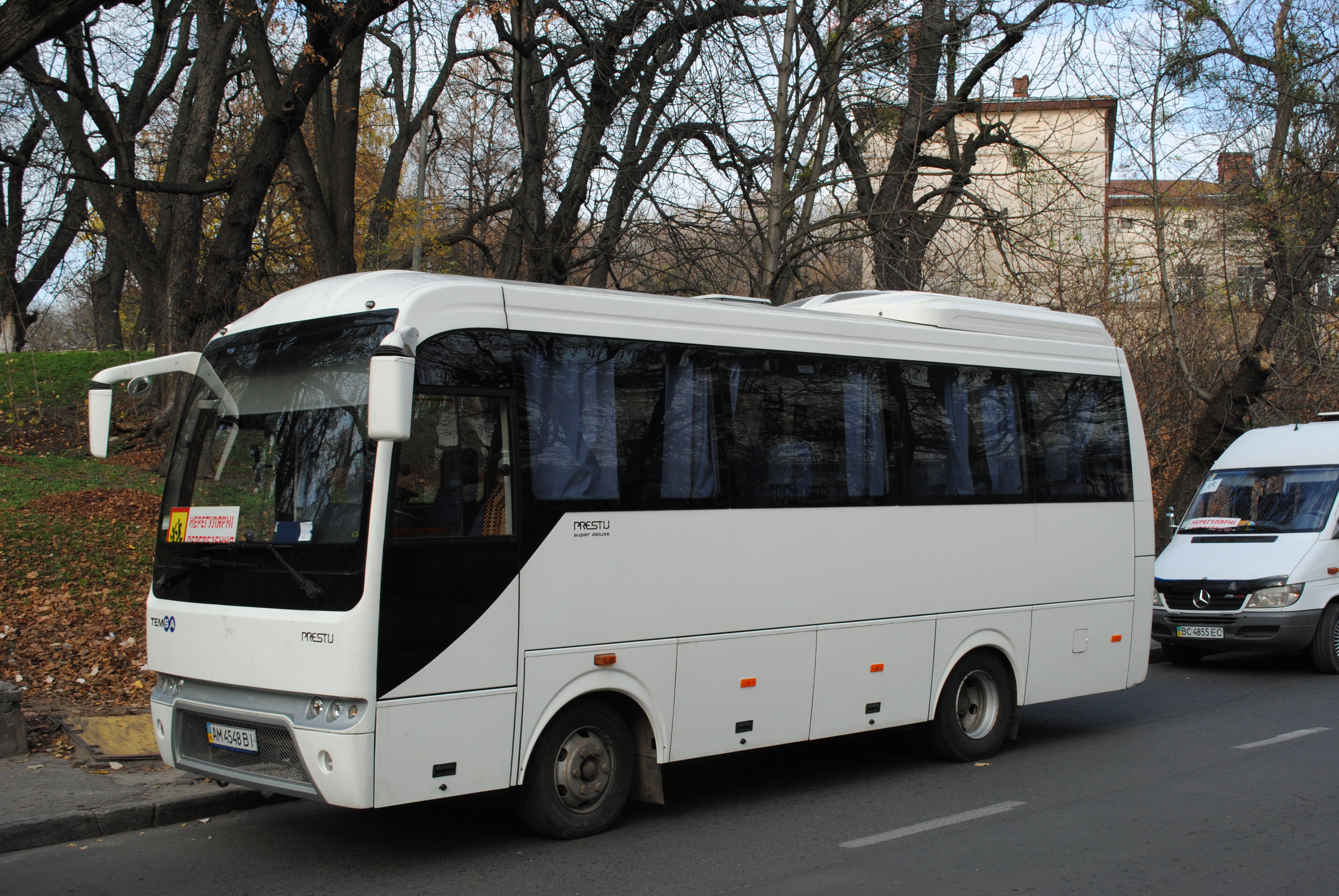
TEMSA Prestige in Zhytomyr, Ukraine

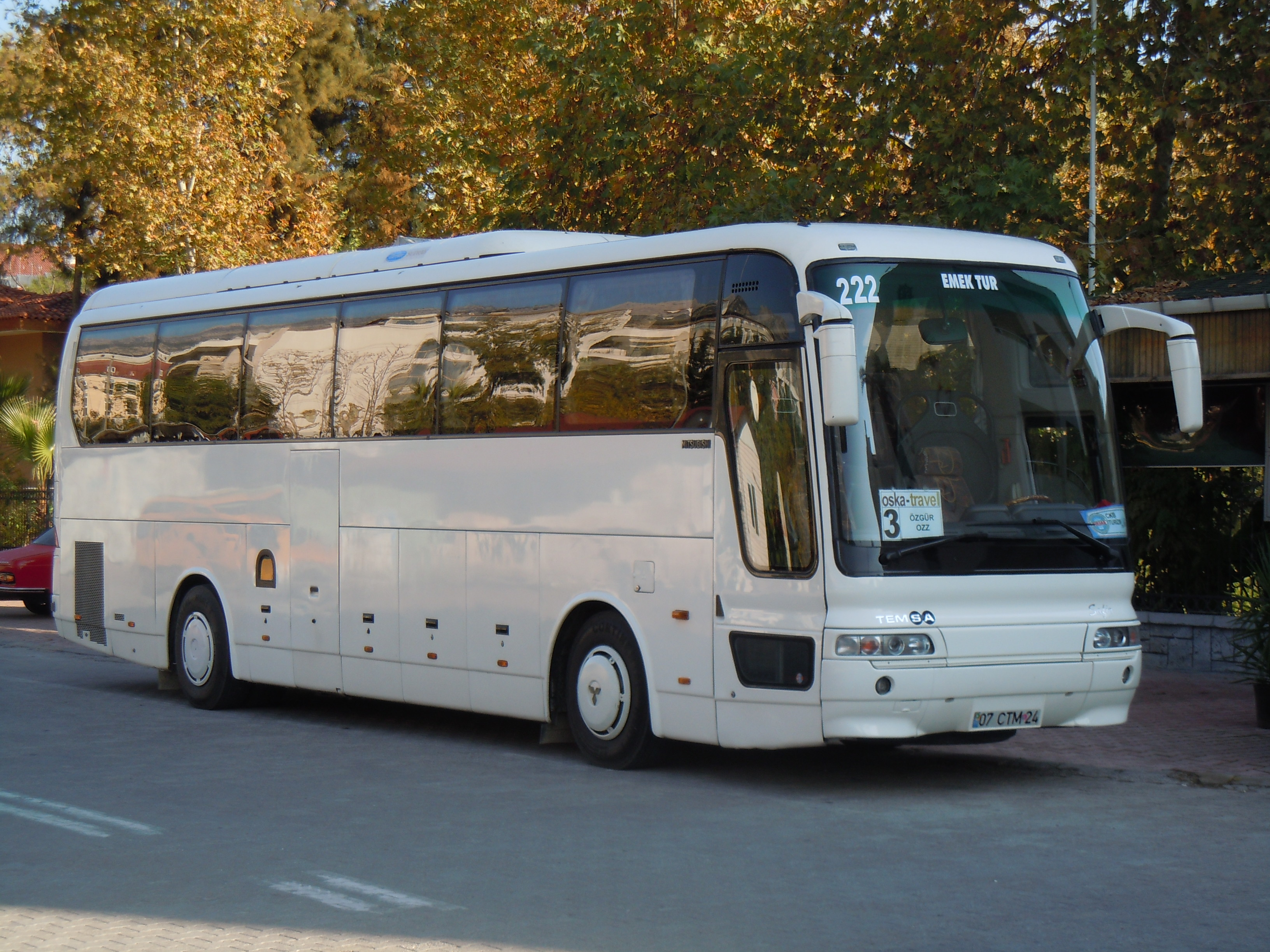
TEMSA Safir in Turkey 2011.

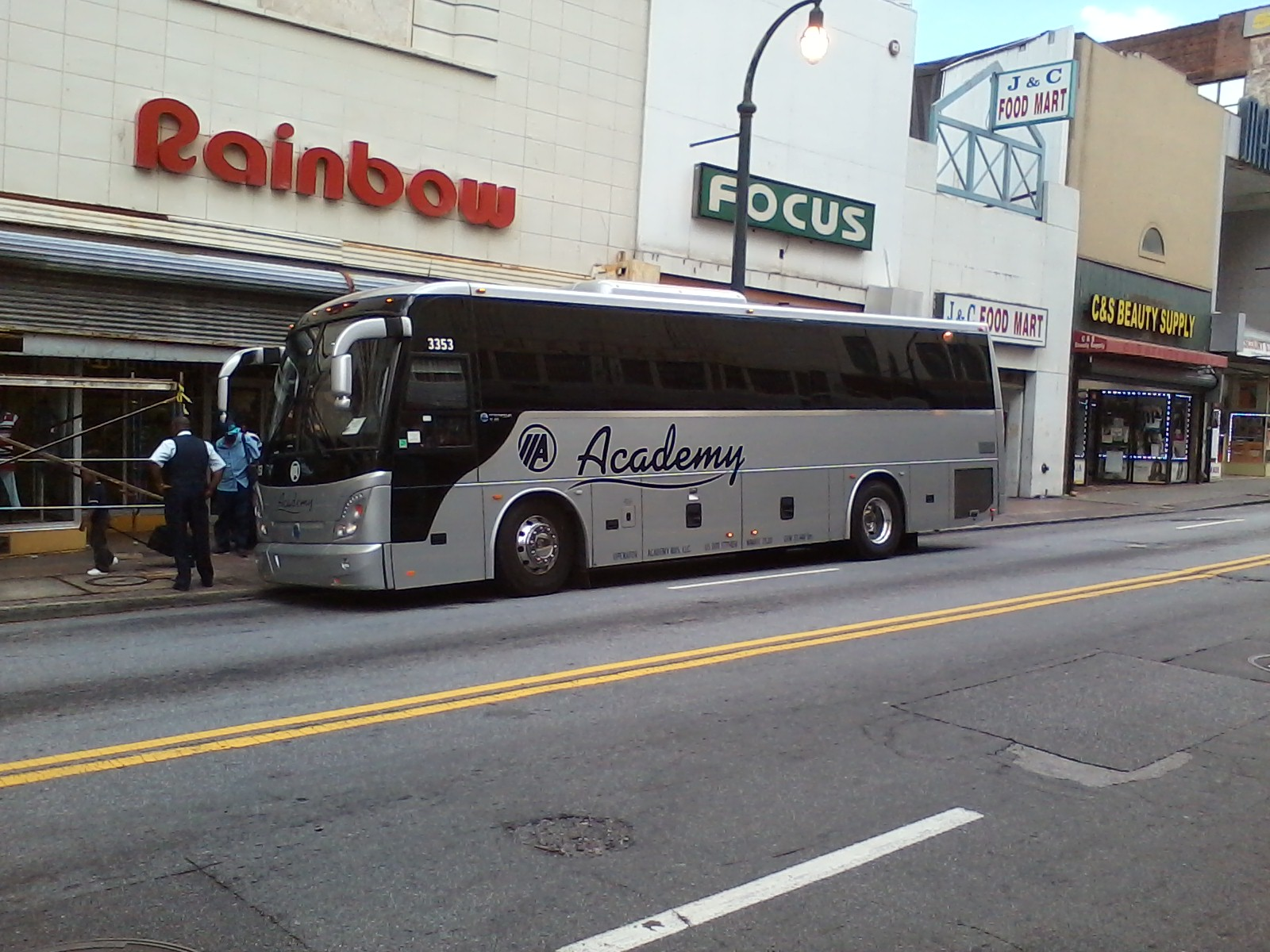
Temsa bus in Atlanta, US

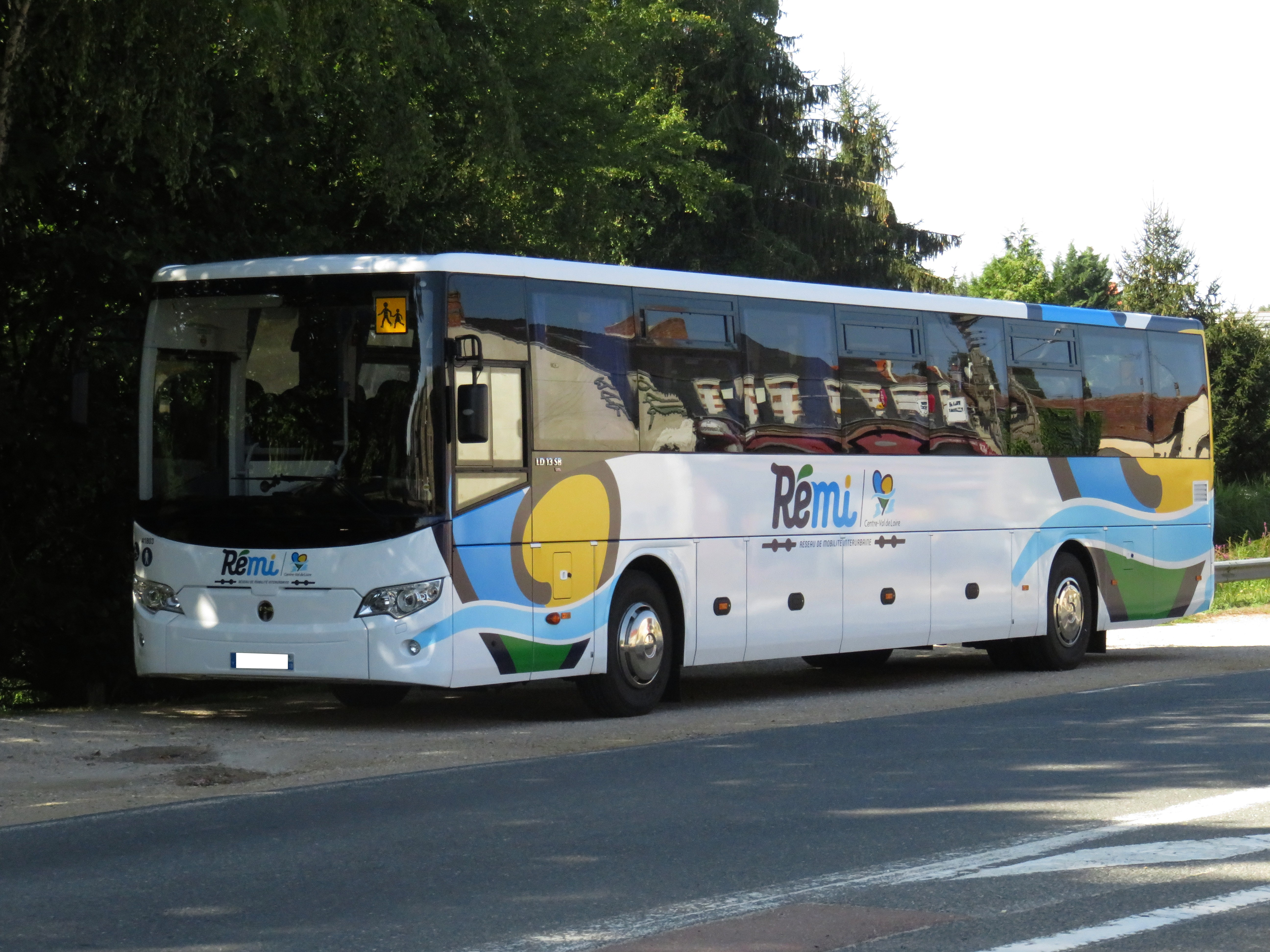
Temsa LD 13 SB Plus in Thénioux, France

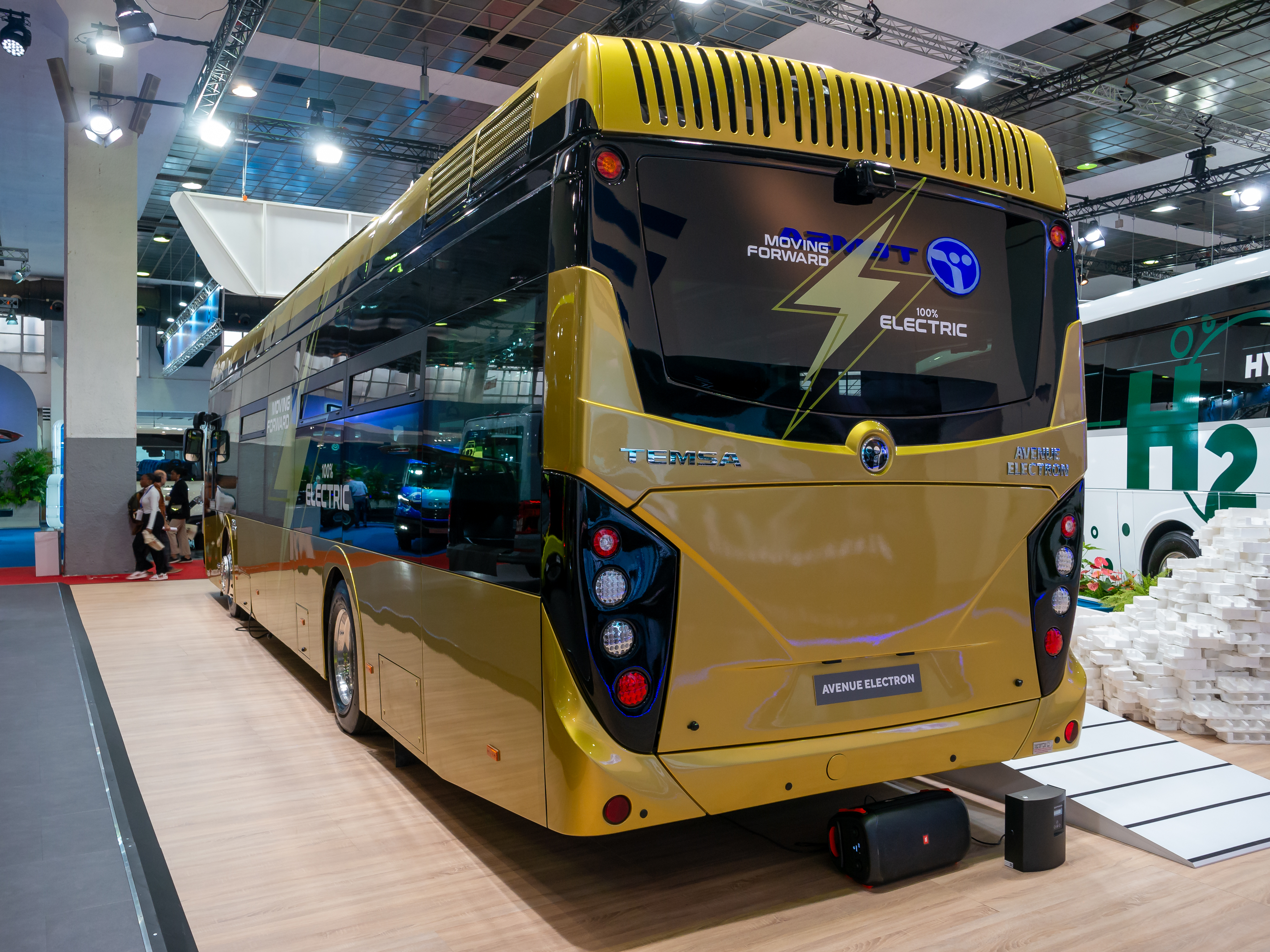
Avenue Electron

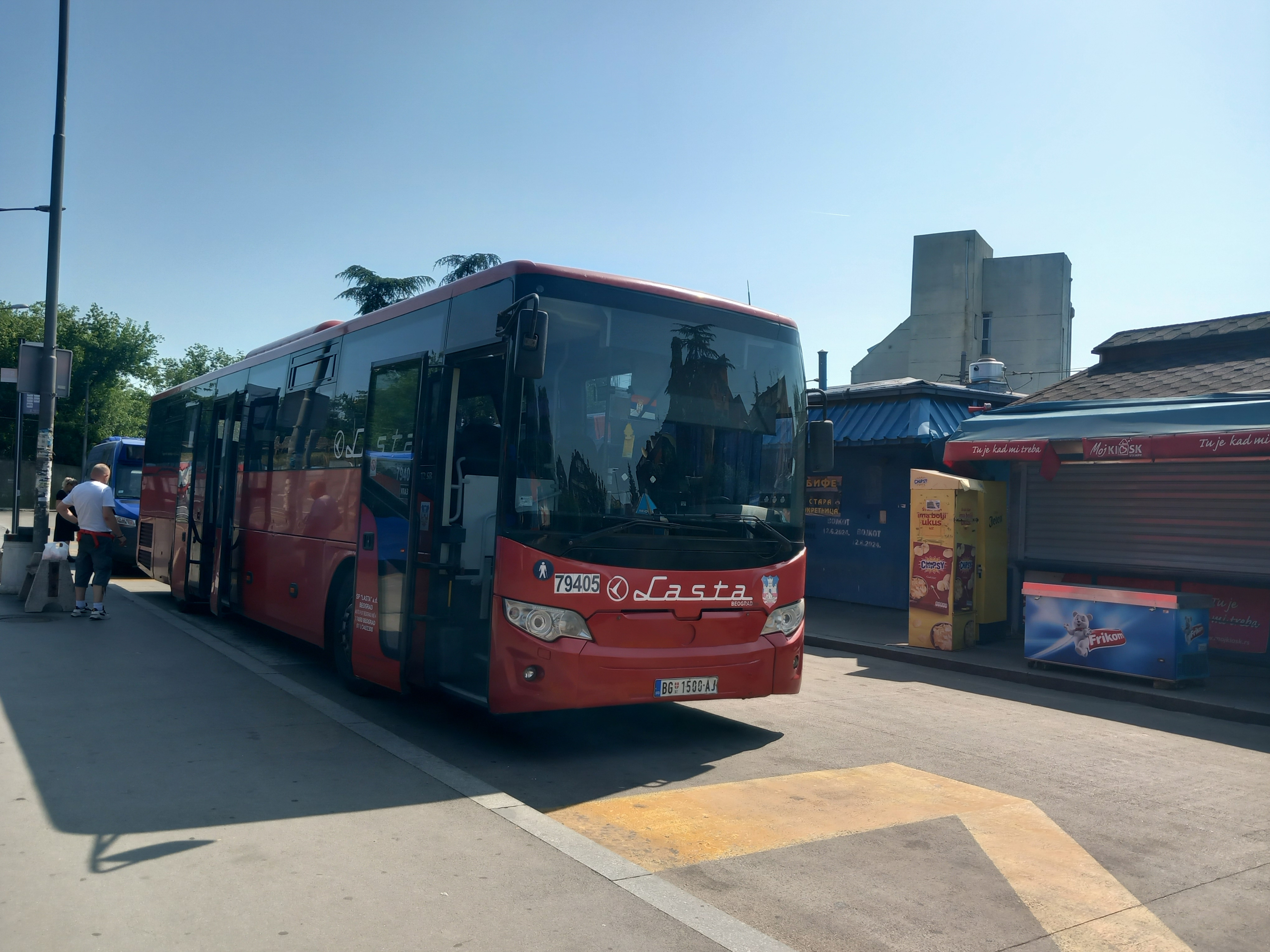
Temsa LD 12 in Serbia

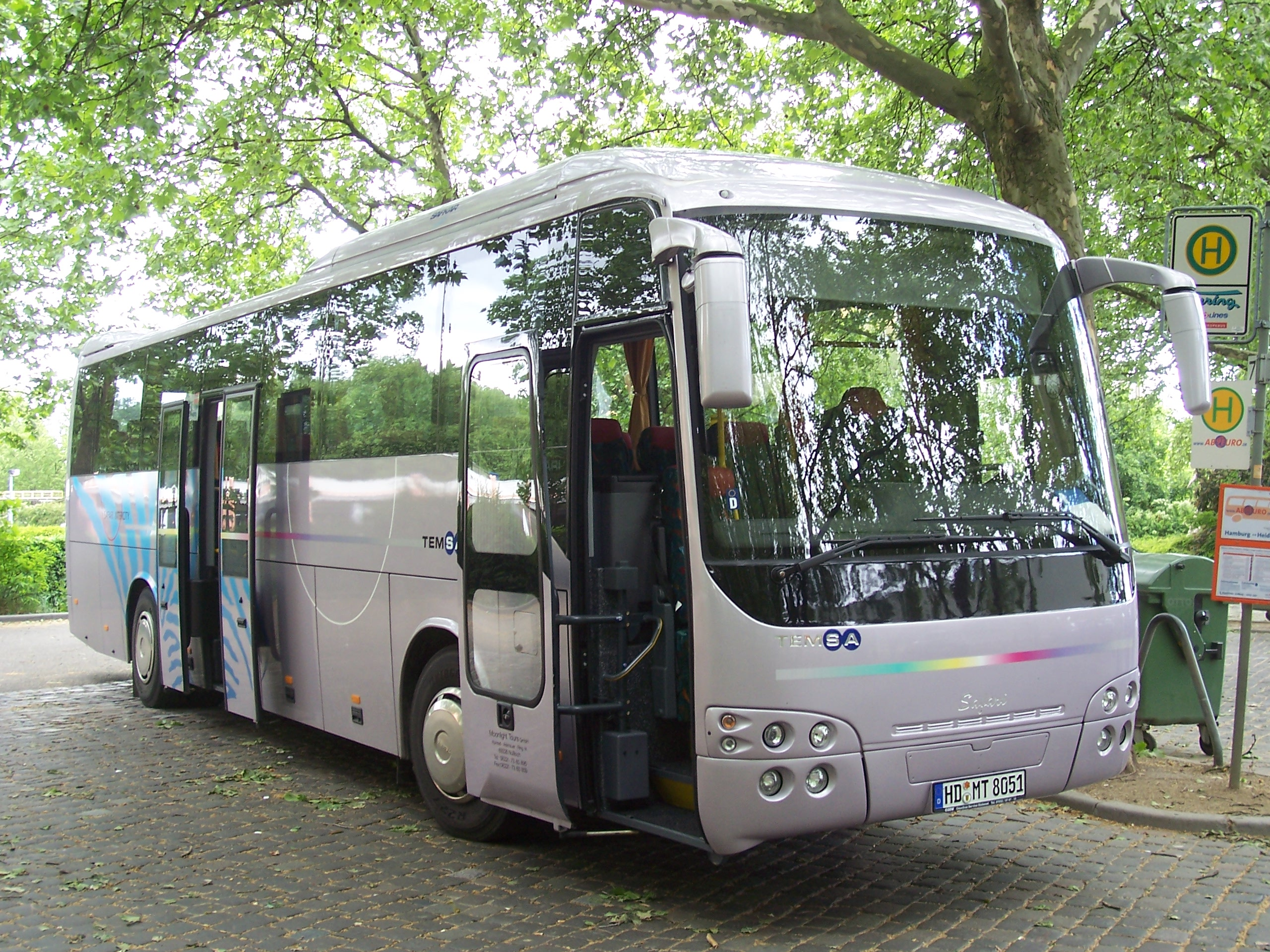
TEMSA Safari HD in Mannheim, Germany

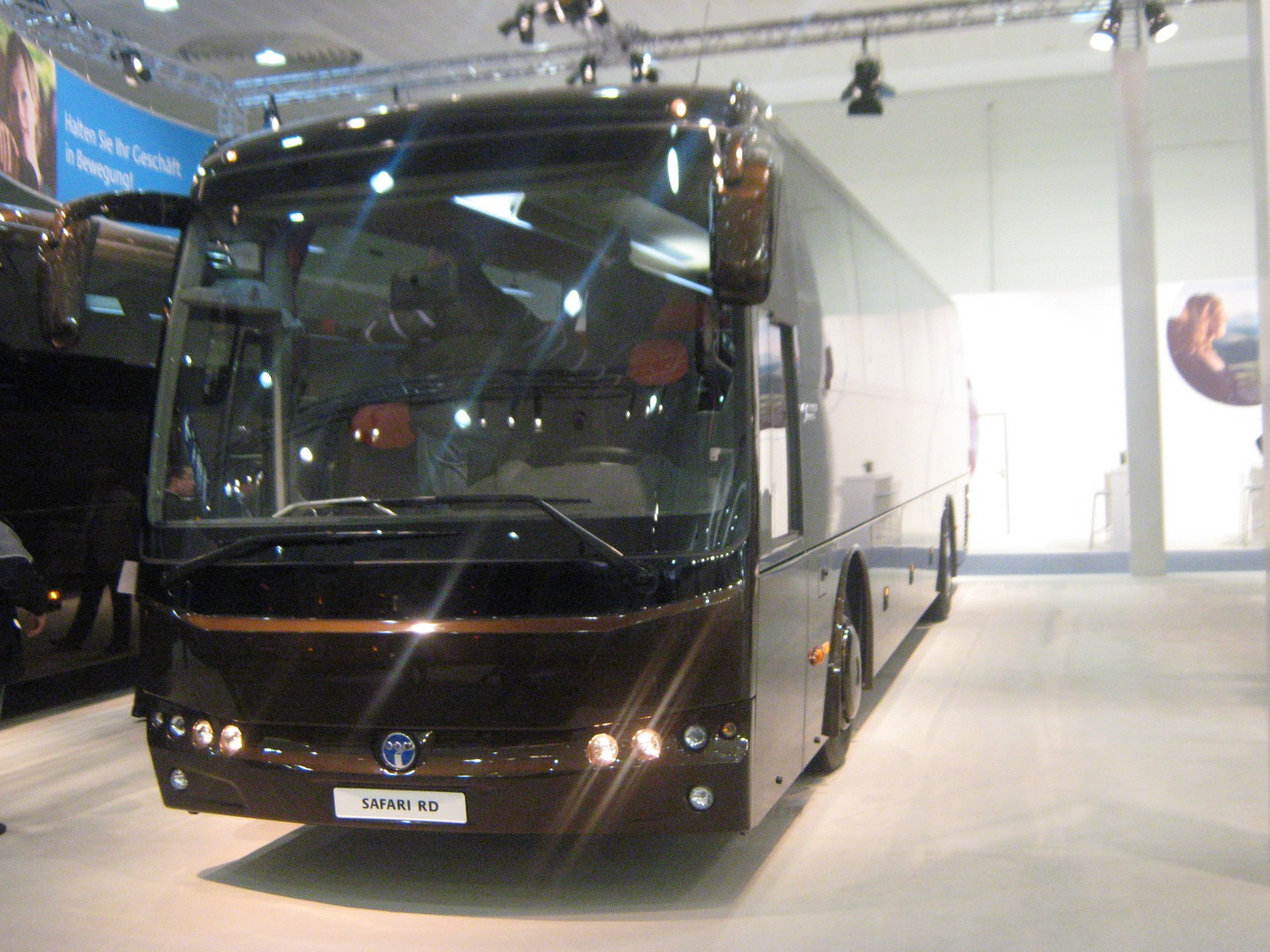
TEMSA Safari RD in Hanover
