= Taiwu =

Taiwu may refer to:

- Taiwu, Pingtung, a town in Pingtung, Taiwan
- Tai Wu (fl. 16th–15th century BC), king of Shang dynasty
- Emperor Taiwu of Northern Wei (408–452), emperor of Northern Wei dynasty
- Empress Taiwu (died 453), or Empress Helian, wife of Emperor Taiwu

== See also ==
- The Scroll of Taiwu
