= Bus Driver (video game) =

2007 video game

- Promotional poster featuring a School bus.
- Developer: SCS Software
- Publishers: SCS Software; Meridian4 (Pocket Edition)
- Platforms: iOS; Microsoft Windows; OS X
- Release: Microsoft Windows: WW: 22 March 2007; OS X: WW: 9 June 2011; iOS: WW: 27 February 2014
- Genre: Vehicle simulation
- Mode: Single-player

Bus Driver is a bus driving simulator game developed by SCS Software. The game was released digitally, for Microsoft Windows on 22 March 2007, and for OS X on 9 June 2011. A port to iOS, entitled Bus Driver – Pocket Edition, was released to the App Store by Meridian4 on 27 February 2014.

== Gameplay ==
The player selects a route from tiers (described below), and then after a short loading time, the player sees the selected bus either at a bus depot or terminal. After halting at the first stop, the bus must be driven along the correct route (indicated at intersections by orange arrows) whilst obeying all traffic rules and stopping at all bus stops. If the player fails to do so, points will be taken from their score. When the game begins, one tier of routes, which includes six buses, is available. In total, there are six tiers, thirty-six routes and thirteen buses (seventeen in Temsa Edition). To unlock the next tier, the player must drive at least four of the routes successfully. As the game progresses, routes become more tedious. The player will lose points if they disobey traffic laws (going out of lane without using blinkers, driving on the wrong side of the road, hitting other vehicles, hitting obstacles like streetlamp), upset passengers (by braking too hard or causing accidents) or they depart from the bus stop too early, honking at the passengers to make them board faster at the bus stop or even if they leave passengers waiting at a bus stop. Conversely, the player will gain points for obeying traffic laws, safe driving and being punctual.

Despite being a game set in the United States, many of the bus stop names and cities are named after areas of London, including Debden, Collier Row, Feltham, Potters Bar and the terminus Westminster.

There are two camera angles, bumper and chase view. Occasionally, there are visuals of rain. Each drive takes place during the day, or at nighttime, depending to the route described. There is a time table. There is also a tab showing what is the distance to the next bus stop.

The game contains a variety of buses which are based on real life buses. As a game set in the United States, most of the buses are based on American designs, however, there are some which are based on European designs since the game was made in the Czech Republic. The buses included are 3 MCI 102D3 (known as GNR-13 LE, including a jail variant which is known as GNR-13 Eco), a Ford B-Series school bus (known as Toucan), a MCI D4500 coach (known as Gryphon Birdie), 2 NovaBus RTS-06 (known as Niva WS-27 Cityroamer), 2 Setra S415HDH (known as Sista XT), 2 Renault Agora S (known as Remark EU) and a Volvo B7TL Wright Eclipse Gemini double decker (known as Velven 18). The Temsa Edition included the Temsa Avenue, Temsa Tourmalin IC, Temsa Opalin, TEMSA Safari HD and the Temsa Diamond.

The initial game contains five tiers. An additional tier was added in Bus Driver Temsa Edition and in Bus Driver Gold Edition. Each tier contains six different routes. To unlock the next tier, the player must drive at least four of the routes successfully. As the game progresses, routes become longer and more complicated. The player has to score more than 0 points to complete each level.

== Reception ==
Reception

Aggregate scores
Aggregator	Score
GameRankings	62%
Metacritic	61/100

Review scores
Publication	Score
CPUGamer	70/100
Game Chronicles	78/100
Game Industry News	2.5/5
GameShark	C (Note: Metacritic interpreted the C as a 50 while GameRankings interpreted it as a 65)
Game Vortex	65/100
GameWatcher	73/100
GameZone	57/100
PC Format	40/100
PC Gamer	42/100
PC Gamer UK	70/100
Pelit (Finland)	75/100 (Note: GameRankings listed it at 70 though this is probably an error because both the original review at Pelit and Metacritic listed it at 75)

Bus Driver received "mixed or average" reviews from critics. Review aggregator Metacritic calculated a score of 61 out of 100 based on 10 critic reviews, with two positive, six mixed, and two negative. GameRankings listed an average of 62% based on 12 reviews.

Some reviewers responded positively to the game's basic gameplay. Game Chronicles praised it for making players "feel good about obeying traffic laws and driving safe", in contrast to more conventional driving games that reward reckless behavior. GameWatcher similarly wrote that the game succeeded as "a simple casual game" that accomplished its limited goals well. CPUGamer said the game avoided the "cardboard feeling" found in some other titles.

Other critics were more mixed. GameZone criticized the game's controls, dated graphics, and sound design, though it found some enjoyment when played "in small doses."

The game's harshest reviews came from PC Gamer and PC Format, both of which scored it in the low 40s; PC Gamer called the experience of getting from one point to another one of the most "wearisome" in a driving game.
