= Truck Simulator =

Vehicle simulation game series

- Genre: Vehicle simulation
- Developer: SCS Software
- Platforms: Windows, macOS, Linux
- First release: Euro Truck Simulator; 6 August 2008
- Latest release: American Truck Simulator; 2 February 2016

Truck Simulator is a vehicle simulation game series created by SCS Software. The first title in the series, Euro Truck Simulator, was released on 29 August 2008 for Microsoft Windows and OS X and the first European-truck simulation established gameplay. The sequel to Euro Truck Simulator, Euro Truck Simulator 2, was released on 19 October 2012 for Microsoft Windows and in 2013 for Linux. It is the successor to the developer's previous truck simulation series 18 Wheels of Steel.

== Games ==
Release timeline
2008	Euro Truck Simulator
2009
2010	German Truck Simulator
2010	UK Truck Simulator
2010	Austrian Truck Simulator (DLC)
2011	Trucks & Trailers
2012	Scania Truck Driving Simulator
2012	Euro Truck Simulator 2
2013
2014
2015
2016	American Truck Simulator

=== Euro Truck Simulator ===
The first Euro Truck Simulator was released on 29 August 2008 for Microsoft Windows and OS X and the first European-developed truck simulation of the games. Players choose their starting country from Austria, Belgium, the Czech Republic, France, Germany, Italy, the Netherlands, Poland, Portugal, Spain, Switzerland, and the United Kingdom (versions 1.2 and 1.3 only). Initially, players only have access to their starting country, unless it contains fewer than three cities, in which case one or more adjacent countries will be accessible as well. For example, if players start the game in Italy or Switzerland, they get connection to the other for free. From there, players choose their first truck with a budget of 100 000 €.

After this, players can start taking jobs from various fictitious companies and delivering cargo to various cities in their starting country to earn money. This money can then be spent on a new truck, upgrading the current truck, expanding the business to other countries, and obtaining a license to drive flammables and chemicals.

The game features European truck models with working instruments such as flashing indicators, temperature and low fuel warning lights, wipers, and gauges. The trucks included are fictionalized variants of the Mercedes-Benz Actros (known as Majestic), the Renault Magnum (known as Runner), the Scania R-series (known as Swift), and the Volvo FH16 (known as Valiant).

=== Euro Truck Simulator 2 ===
The direct sequel to the Euro Truck Simulator, Euro Truck Simulator 2, was released on 19 October 2012 for Microsoft Windows and in 2013 for Linux. Players choose their starting city from various locations in Austria, Belgium, the Czech Republic, France, Germany, Hungary (in the Going East! extension), Italy, Luxembourg, the Netherlands, Poland, Slovakia, Switzerland, and the United Kingdom.

At first, the player can only take what are known as quick jobs. These quick jobs involve the delivery of trailers and goods from one factory (garage) to another (usually involves delivery between different town and countries). The quick jobs are offered by logistics and delivery companies in the game and all fuel, servicing, and highway toll fees and costs are paid by the employer (the delivery companies). Therefore, when doing quick jobs, no paying of tolls, fuel, and servicing fees are required. As the player earns money or takes out bank loans, they can eventually afford to buy themselves a truck, which they can buy from truck dealers and truck showrooms (note that the truck dealers and showrooms must be 'discovered' first). With enough money, players can acquire a home garage, and start making more money by delivering cargo using their own truck instead of just being a driver for hire (freight market). Money earned in the game can be spent on upgrading or purchasing new trucks, hiring NPC drivers to take on deliveries (relevant employment agency must be 'discovered' first), buying more garages, and expanding the home garage to accommodate more trucks.

The player gains experience points after each delivery which increases the player's level, and a skill point is awarded after each level-up. Skill points can be used to unlock deliveries that require different ADR classes, longer distance deliveries, special cargo loads, fragile cargo loads, urgent deliveries, and eco-driving. This progression allows the player to take on better-paying jobs.

The game features seventy-seven cities in thirteen countries, over twenty types of cargo, and over fifteen fictional European companies.

The game included two new truck companies, Scania and Renault Trucks, with MAN returning from the original game. DAF, Iveco, Mercedes-Benz, and Volvo trucks were not officially licensed and had their names changed to DAV, Ivedo, Majestic, and Valiant, respectively. Later updates included the official license for DAF, Iveco, and Volvo, and the official branding for the DAF XF, Volvo FH16, and Iveco Stralis. In January 2013, SCS Software announced a downloadable content package called Going East!, expanding the game map into Central Europe. The DLC saw the introduction of thirteen new cities across Poland, Slovakia, the Czech Republic, and a new country, Hungary, and was released in September 2013. The Mercedes-Benz license was added to the game with version 1.18.1.

=== American Truck Simulator ===
American Truck Simulator takes place in the United States, and features over 150 cities. The game features American-style conventional trucks, instead of the European cab over trucks found in the previous two games, and was released on 2 February 2016.

== See also ==
- Direct-drive sim racing wheel
