= Euro Truck Simulator =

2008 video game

- Developer: SCS Software
- Publishers: Microsoft Windows: NA: Meridian4; EU: Excalibur Publishing; AU: n3vrf41l Publishing; WW: SCS Software; OS X: WW: SCS Software
- Series: Truck Simulator
- Platforms: Microsoft Windows; OS X
- Release: Microsoft Windows: EU: 6 August 2008; WW: 29 September 2008; OS X: WW: 27 February 2012
- Genre: Vehicle simulation
- Mode: Single-player

Euro Truck Simulator (known as Big Rig Europe in North America) is a 2008 truck simulation game developed and published by the Czech company SCS Software. The game is set in a scaled-down rendition of Europe, from the United Kingdom and Portugal to Poland and the Czech Republic, where players drive a variety of semi-trucks and trailers across the continent, visiting the continent's major cities and picking up and delivering cargo for various companies. More than 300,000 copies of the game have been sold in Europe. It is the first installment in the Truck Simulator series of games.

== Gameplay ==
Euro Truck Simulator offers a realistic driving experience for navigating trucks around Europe. The player must deliver goods around Europe while obeying street signs, highway rules and managing their fuel levels. Euro Truck Simulator has different truck models from different companies. Each truck has its own unique engine power, tires, and size that affect its driving capabilities. The game doesn't feature an ending and allows players to continue after having completed all objectives.

A LKWLog trailer attached to a Swift truck

The game features four European truck models, available in three classes each, with working instruments such as flashing indicators, temperature and low fuel warning lights, wipers, and gauges. Since the game lacks an official license from truck manufacturers, the trucks included, despite closely resembling real-life truck models, are given generic names, Majestic (Mercedes-Benz Actros), Runner (Renault Magnum), Swift (Scania R-series) and Valiant (Volvo FH16).

== Reception ==
Reception

Review scores
| Publication | Score |
|---|---|
| Jeuxvideo.com | 65/100 |
| PC Games (DE) | 20/100 |
| PC Zone | 40/100 |
| GameStar (Germany) | 64/100 |

The game received mostly positive reviews from critics upon its release. Reviewers highlighted the game's good graphics, the game world and a "satisfying driving experience." They also mentioned the long driving times and repetitive gameplay as uninteresting for those not fans of transportation simulators.

User scores on Metacritic, Steam and GameSpot indicate more favourable opinions from customers than initial reviews suggested.

== Sequel ==
A sequel, Euro Truck Simulator 2, was released in 2012.
