= Sultan's Game =

2025 video game

- Developer: Double Cross
- Publisher: 2P Games
- Platform: Windows
- Mode: Single-player

Sultan's Game is a card-based role-playing video game developed by Double Cross and published by 2P Games. It was released March 30, 2025 on Steam.

== Gameplay ==
Sultan's Game is set in a kingdom reminiscent of Shahriyâr's in One Thousand and One Nights, but with every item and living thing represented by a card containing a tier of either Stone, Bronze, Silver and Gold. A magician arrives at the kingdom's palace to present the eponymous Sultan with a twisted game involving a box of Carnality, Extravagance, Conquest, and Bloodshed cards to be broken. Breaking a Bloodshed card on a target leads to its killing, breaking a Carnality card on a target usually leads to sex, breaking a Conquest card involves capturing or overcoming a challenging target, and breaking the Extravagance card usually involves giving money away to the target.

Each card also contains one of the same 4 possible tiers which, once dealt to an assigned player, must be broken within 7 days by using it on certain targets possessing the same tier as that of the dealt card. Once broken, the magician deals another card at random to the player, ostensibly until there are no more cards in box. The player initially begins as the sadistic Sultan for the starting tutorial, before switching focus for the remainder of the game to a nobleman named Arzu; who plays under the threat of execution by the Sultan as a reprisal for speaking out against him.

== Development ==
Double Cross cited various inspirations for the imagery and plot of Sultan's Game, such as Gandharan Buddhist art and texts, the Persian Rubaiyat poems of Omar Khayyam, and Friedrich Dürrenmatt's play The Visit. For the setting in particular, the developers strove to avoid basing it on a specific region or period in history due to the amount of research it would require.

== Reception ==
Reception

Aggregate score
Aggregator	Score
Metacritic	(PC) 83/100

The PC version of Sultan's Game received generally favorable reviews from critics, according to the review aggregation website Metacritic.

RPGFan adored its Arabic inspired aesthetics and music, stating it was "brimming with imaginative writing and scenarios". In a demo review, PC Gamer noted its completeness and how it forces you to do "evil things" to survive, which it avoided feeling overly gratutious or merely doing it for shock value. GamerSky complimented how it encourages multiple playthroughs with out of game progression elements akin to roguelikes. Softpedia appreciated its "dark and beautiful" visual elements, but noted that some veer close to NSFW, which could offend players.

Chinese fans of Sultan's Game adored the political rival to the Sultan, Nawfal. This is expressed via players agreeing to help overthrow the Sultan and through mediums such as fan art. Writer Chen Silin stated that this is because of how he evoked figures of feudal China that overthrew corrupt regimes, which some Chinese fans appeared aware of.

Within 48 hours of release, Sultan's Game had already sold 100,000 copies. In July 2025, the game hit a million sales.
