= Sons of the Forest =

- Developer: Endnight Games
- Publisher: Newnight
- Directors: Ben Falcone; Rod Green
- Designer: Anna Terekhova
- Programmers: Friso Kristiansen; Jon Kreuzer; Guillaume Kehren; Dominik Kyeck; Alexandre Haffner
- Composer: Gabe Castro
- Engine: Unity
- Platform: Windows
- Release: February 22, 2024 (Note: Released into early access on February 23, 2023)
- Genre: Survival horror
- Modes: Single-player, multiplayer

Sons of the Forest is a survival horror video game developed by Endnight Games and published by Newnight. Serving as the sequel to the 2018 video game The Forest, the story centers on a protagonist sent to a mysterious island to search for a missing CEO and his family, while facing cannibalistic monsters and uncovering an ancient secret buried deep underground. The game was released via early access on February 23, 2023, for Microsoft Windows on Steam, before its full release on February 22, 2024.

== Gameplay ==
Similarly to The Forest, Sons of the Forest puts players in control of a protagonist stranded on an island inhabited by cannibals. Players can build weapons and buildings to aid in their survival. The game supports up to eight-player cooperative multiplayer, though players can also opt to play the game solo. Depending on their actions, players can receive different endings.

The map in this game is four times bigger than that of its predecessor. Several new mechanics have been added to the game, such as 3D printing, as well as friendly NPCs. NPCs include:

- Kelvin, who is deaf-mute. Players can give Kelvin written commands on a piece of paper to help with simple tasks such as collecting crafting resources or setting up fires.
- Virginia, a three-legged, three-armed woman. Virginia is initially skittish, but can be coaxed into friendship, then equipped with weapons to aid in combat.

== Plot ==
Many years after the events of The Forest, a team of private military contractors hired by PuffCorp is dispatched to an island called "Site 2" to search for Edward Puffton (PuffCorp's founder and CEO), his wife Barbara, and his 20 year old daughter Virginia, who have been missing for several months. Jack Holt, the player's character, is a renowned journalist and personal friend of Edward who accompanies the team. The team's helicopters are then shot down by unknown assailants. Jack survives the crash but is knocked out by a man in a silver coat named Jianyu Zhang, a former PuffCorp employee now working for Sahara Therapeutics: the corporation responsible for the events on Site 1. Jack awakens with another surviving teammate named Kelvin, who was rendered deaf and mentally handicapped by the crash.

Working together, Jack and Kelvin set up camp and obtain resources to survive, defending themselves from cannibal tribes and underground mutants. They are also joined by Virginia, who became a mutant but somehow managed to retain her humanity. As Jack explores the island, he finds sprawling cave systems, underground bunkers, luxury facilities, and ancient structures showing evidence of an advanced civilization. From documents he finds along the way, Jack learns that PuffCorp acquired the island under the guise of turning it into a resort, but was actually competing secretly with Sahara Therapeutics for control of an artifact known as the "Cube". The Cube and the island's other relics are composed of a rare and previously undiscovered golden ore called “Solafite”, which is found to have medicinal properties. Jack eventually finds surveillance footage showing that all the resort guests were suddenly transformed into mutants at a dinner party; Edward and Barbara Puffton were among them, and he is forced to kill them when he finds them.

Jack also encounters Eric and Timmy LeBlanc, the famed survivors of the Site 1 incident, who have come in search of the Cube to cure Timmy of his uncontrollable mutations. After being separated from the pair during a stand-off with Jianyu, Jack learns that the Cube can travel between Alternate dimensions, will activate every eight lunar cycles, and that the only safe haven is inside the Cube itself. It is then deduced that the Cube's activations were what caused the mass mutations throughout the island, thus creating the cannibals and the mutants, and that the next activation is due to be soon.

At the VIP bunker, Jack reunites with Timmy and they make their way underground towards the Cube; they manage to get inside just before it closes, locking Jianyu outside. When the Cube activates, Timmy has a seizure and briefly splits into multiple versions of himself before the Cube shows them a vision of a futuristic alien city. The Cube deactivates, resets its timer, and reopens to reveal that Jianyu has mutated into a gigantic monster. Jack and Timmy return to the surface to see helicopters arriving, but are forced to fight Jianyu. After defeating him, an artifact found by the player will strip Jack of his backpack, and then attempt to lure him back towards it. Several endings are then possible:

- If the player decides to retrieve their backpack, or simply waits, Jack decides to stay behind on the island and the LeBlancs leave without him.
- If the player decides to board the helicopter, Jack leaves the island with the LeBlancs. In the epilogue, Timmy shows a sample of Solafite to a doctor. Then a series of news articles reveal Timmy becoming CEO of his own pharmaceutical company, profiting off of medical cures made from Solafite, which has also cured his mutations. Jack releases a successful book about his experiences on Site 2, and Timmy discovers another island rich with Solafite, only to mysteriously disappear and for contact with the island to be lost.
- If Kelvin and Virginia survived, they will join Jack inside the Cube, and will also board the helicopter if the player chooses to. Then their respective endings will be included in the epilogue: Virginia is cured of her mutations, and Kelvin remains mentally damaged but becomes close friends with Jack. Five months later, Kelvin and a pregnant Virginia join Jack for a joyride in his sports car.

== Development ==
Sons of the Forest was delayed twice. Announced in December 2019, the game had an initial May 2022 release date. On March 25, 2022, the game was delayed to October of that year "to be able to deliver our vision of the next step in survival games", according to the developer Endnight Games. That August, the game was delayed again to its final release date of February 23, 2023. It was later announced on February 3, 2023, that the game would launch in early access to avoid further delays.

On November 29, 2023, Endnight Games announced that the 1.0 version of the game, containing major gameplay and story updates, would launch on February 22, 2024.

== Reception ==
Reception

Aggregate score
Aggregator	Score
Metacritic	86/100

Review scores
Publication	Score
GamesRadar+	4.5/5
IGN	9/10
Shacknews	6/10

Sons of the Forest received "generally favorable" reviews from critics, according to the review aggregation website Metacritic.

Sons of the Forest surpassed Starfield as the most wishlisted game on Steam. The game sold over 2 million copies within 24 hours of release, and had over 250,000 concurrent players on Steam during its launch day. It became the best-selling game on Steam at the time.

=== Early Access ===
IGN said that "Sons of the Forest takes everything its predecessor did well and does it a little bit better," including the improved AI, larger map, and graphics, but noted poor performance optimization and an unfinished story.

GamingBolt, stated that Sons of the Forest is "exciting, immersive, and beautiful (...) extremely scary and absolutely packed with content", thus claiming the game was a success and "absolutely worth your time," despite not being complete as of its Early Access release - ultimately calling it "Greatness in Progress".

=== Full Release ===
Leana Hafer of IGN wrote that that the 1.0 release of Sons of the Forest "improved in just about every way upon its predecessor," praising the game's story and sense of tension as well as noting that the full release was better optimized than the early access version.

Writing for Rock Paper Shotgun, Matt Cox stated that the game's setting was its strongest point but found combat lacking and the sense of progression limited by quests required to advance the plot.

=== Accolades ===
Date	Award	Category	Result	Ref.
December 31, 2024	The Steam Awards	Better With Friends	Nominated	

== Sequel ==
A sequel, Forest 3, was announced in December 2025.
