= The Forest (video game) =

2018 first-person survival horror video game

- Developer: Endnight Games
- Publisher: Endnight Games
- Director: Ben Falcone
- Designer: Anna Terekhova
- Programmer: Guillaume Kehren
- Composer: Gabe Castro
- Engine: Unity
- Platforms: Windows; PlayStation 4
- Release: Windows; 30 April 2018; PlayStation 4; 6 November 2018
- Genres: Survival horror, survival game
- Modes: Single-player, multiplayer

The Forest is a survival horror video game developed and published by Endnight Games. Its core gameplay loop consists of a non-linear open-world survival experience built around traditional video game survival mechanics extended by the game's signature threat management system in which players must survive against the Cannibals and Mutants that inhabit the environment by gathering resources, crafting weapons and traps, constructing defensive fortifications, and engaging in or avoiding combat.

Alongside the core survival gameplay, the game features an optional, gradually unfolding mystery-adventure. The otherwise open-ended structure increasingly gives way to a more linear narrative. Having survived a plane crash at the start of the game, stranded player-protagonist Eric LeBlanc explores the peninsula and investigate its caves and sinister hidden facilities in search of his abducted son Timmy. The narrative is revealed primarily through environmental storytelling and exploration, allowing players to either pursue Eric's search to its conclusion or remain indefinitely within the open-world survival sandbox.

Whereas enemies in many contemporary survival games simply attacked on sight, The Forest's enemies engage in seemingly unexplainable and unpredictable behaviour. They observe, stalk, surround, intimidate, and probe the player before committing to open combat, creating prolonged tension. Combined with the game's dense forests, dark cave systems, limited visibility, and sparse use of music, this unpredictability reinforces an atmosphere in which psychological horror arises as much as the body horror from the grotesque enemies, macabre buildings, decaying corpses, and heads impaled on sticks.

Following a four-year long early access beta phase releasing in 2014, the finished game was released for Windows in April 2018, and for the PlayStation 4 in November 2018. The game was a commercial success, selling over five million copies by the end of 2018. In 2020, Rock Paper Shotgun placed the game 9th on their "The best survival games on PC" list.

== Gameplay ==
In The Forest, players control Eric LeBlanc and must survive on a forested island and search for his missing son Timmy after a devastating plane crash. Players must survive by creating shelter, weapons, and other survival tools. Inhabiting the island, along with various woodland creatures, are a tribe of cannibalistic mutants, who dwell in villages on the surface and in deep caves beneath the island. While they are not necessarily always hostile to the player, their usual behaviour is aggressive, especially during the night.

However, the developers wanted players to question whether the island's cannibalistic tribe is the enemy of the player or vice versa. For example, when first encountering the player, the cannibals may hesitate to attack and instead observe the player from a distance, attempt to communicate with the player through effigies, and send patrols around the player's base camp. In combat, they regularly attempt to protect one another from injury, remove torches, surround the player, hide behind cover, drag wounded tribesmen to safety, keep their distance, use tactical decisions, not overextend into unknown territory, and occasionally surrender out of fear. They are also afraid of fire, and will sometimes refrain from approaching the player if there is a campfire or torch nearby. However, the more aggressive the player is towards the cannibals, the more relentless they will become in their attacks on the player’s base camp; if a player takes their time and avoids the cannibals upon encountering them, it is possible for cannibals to remain neutral or less aggressive for many in-game days. Though there are no set missions, there is an optional conclusion to the game.

As the player progresses through the game and explores the caves underneath the forest surface, they will encounter increasingly bizarre mutations, including deformed babies and mutants with several extra appendages. The game also features a day and night cycle, with the player able to build a shelter and traps, hunt animals and collect supplies during the day, and defend themselves against the mutants by night.

The player is given a survival guide book, with notes about discovered wildlife on the island, and a basic to-do list to help guide players. The guidebook also allows players to place blueprints for the various structures (such as bonfires, walls, tree-houses and traps) in the game. Simply select a blueprint, then place it in the open-world. Once placed, gather the necessary resources (like rocks and logs) in order to complete the structure. Most shelters feature an option for saving the game, since there is no autosave in the game.

Items that the player gathers in the world (like herbs, animals furs, or tools) can be stored in the inventory. The inventory includes a crafting system, based on the player's knowledge and experimentation with creating items. To craft a basic axe, the player needs to collect then combine a stick, rock, and rope, once all items are placed on the crafting space a gear icon indicates the player can combine them. Here, the player may also choose four items for quick-select.

The HUD displays the player's total health, energy, stamina, hunger, and thirst levels. Water can be obtained from lakes and rivers, but most are contaminated causing side effects to the player. Polluted water can be boiled to purify it, or a water collector built to collect clean rainwater. Food has to be obtained from animals, plants, and other humans in the world. The survival/crafting book also contains traditional character attributes like strength, weight, athleticism and sanity. At sufficiently low sanities, the player character can build their own effigies.

== Plot ==
The game begins with Eric LeBlanc, a survival television actor, sitting in an airplane with his son, Timmy, before it suddenly crashes on a remote heavily forested peninsula. Despite being the sole survivors of the crash, a disoriented Eric watches helplessly as Timmy is kidnapped by a man covered in red paint before falling unconscious. Upon awakening in the wreckage, Eric goes out in search of his son but discovers that the peninsula is occupied by feral cannibalistic mutants, and is forced to defend himself while surviving on the land. In his search, Eric finds clues of Timmy's whereabouts in the form of crayon drawings in several caverns. Eric may also spot the man in red from a distance, who will flee if approached.

Eric eventually reaches an abandoned underground lab complex owned by Sahara Therapeutics, a large research company responsible for experimenting with creatures on the peninsula. Upon entering the lab, Eric finds the lab's personnel dead and discovers that they were studying an artifact called the Resurrection Obelisk. Created by a mysterious group called the Ancient Ones, the artifact has the power to resurrect the dead but requires a child sacrifice. Eric also learns that his son's kidnapper, Dr. Matthew Cross, was a chief researcher at the facility before losing his daughter Megan to an escaped mutant. Driven insane by his daughter's death, Cross resorted to using the artifact and kidnapped Timmy as a sacrifice to revive Megan.

Eric soon finds Cross dead and then the artifact, only to find Timmy's corpse inside; having already been sacrificed to revive Megan. Despite being too late to save his son, Eric realizes that the machine connected to the artifact can still be used to resurrect Timmy and goes deeper into the facility in search of a sacrifice. Eric eventually encounters the revived Megan but discovers that the machine has turned her into a mutant and is forced to kill her when she mutates further. He then attempts to use her dead body as a sacrifice to bring back Timmy, though it ultimately ends in failure as a live sacrifice is needed. He then reaches the facility's observatory and discovers a second artifact known as the Power Obelisk, which functions as a type of EMP device capable of bringing down planes when activated, implying that Cross used it to cause the plane crash. Eric is then faced with either activating the artifact as a passenger flight passes overhead or shutting it down.

The game features two endings:

- If Eric activates the artifact, he causes the plane to crash and is implied to have found a sacrifice to revive Timmy. One year later, Eric and Timmy have apparently been rescued and are invited onto a talk show to promote Eric's book, which chronicles his experiences on the peninsula. During the show, Timmy suddenly collapses and begins violently shaking, seemingly about to mutate like Megan did. Eric comforts Timmy and he returns to normal. Years later, an older Timmy is shown in his apartment, investigating a peninsula labeled "Site 2" while still struggling to suppress his mutations.
- If Eric decides to shut down the artifact, he spares the lives of everyone on the plane at the cost of Timmy remaining dead. Eric then leaves the facility and burns a photo of Timmy, choosing to let go. After this final cutscene, control of Eric is then returned to the player, who can continue gameplay surviving on the peninsula.

== Development ==
The Forest was inspired by cult films such as The Descent and Cannibal Holocaust and video games like Don't Starve, and was accepted as part of Steam Greenlight in 2013. Canadian-based developers Endnight Games have said that Disney was an inspiration for the game, commenting that they do not want the whole game to be entirely "dark and depressing." The game received an update in May 2018 that added compatibility for the Oculus Rift and HTC Vive virtual reality headsets with a later update supporting the Valve Index. After adding a co-op mode option during development, the team stated that they wished for the game to stay away from the massive multiplayer feel of other games, such as DayZ and Rust.

The development team has a background in film visual effects, having worked on films such as The Amazing Spider-Man 2 and Tron: Legacy. The initial budget for the game was $125,000. The game was first released for Windows via early access on 30 May 2014 before it officially released on 30 April 2018. It was later released for the PlayStation 4 on November 6, 2018. The game was built using the Unity engine.

== Reception ==
Reception

Aggregate score
Aggregator	Score
Metacritic	PC: 83/100; PS4: 78/100

Review score
Publication	Score
IGN	8.4/10

The game received positive reception during its early access period. The game sold over 5.3 million copies on Windows by November 2018. IGN called the game a "memorable survival horror experience", praising the game for its enemy AI and multi-layered story but criticized its display settings, mentioning that the game can get too dark at times. The game's success spawned a sequel, titled Sons of the Forest which was released on February 23, 2023.

In 2020, Rock Paper Shotgun placed The Forest ninth on their "The best survival games on PC" list. On their updated list in 2023, The Forest placed 21st.

== Sequels ==
A sequel game, Sons of the Forest, was released in Early Access for Windows on February 23, 2023. A second sequel, Forest 3, was announced in December 2025.
