= Tale of Immortal =

2023 video game by Ghost Valley Studio

- Developer: Ghost Valley Studio
- Publishers: Ghost Valley Studio; Lightning Games
- Composers: Páng Yǔ (庞宇 "Eamon"), Salt Sound Studio (一罐盐)
- Engine: Unity
- Platforms: Windows (2021); Nintendo Switch (2024); Android (2025); IOS (2025)
- Genres: Action RPG; sandbox; simulation
- Mode: Single-player

Tale of Immortal (Chinese: 鬼谷八荒) is a 2023 open world sandbox video game developed and published by Ghost Valley Studio and co-published by Lightning Games. Initially released in early access on Steam for Windows in January 2021, the game received its 1.0 release in May 2023, and a Nintendo Switch version followed in 2024, with mobile versions for both Android and IOS released in 2025 by Wenxin Games.

The game was initially released in Chinese, with one review from TheGamer stating that an English translation would likely arrive, which was announced in a Steam update on March 6, 2021, to be released the following month.

Tale of Immortal, inspired by Chinese myth compilation Classic of Mountains and Seas, is set in a world rooted in ancient mythology and Taoist folklore. The player, referred to as a "cultivator" along with rival NPCs, is tasked with developing their martial-arts skills to become an immortal god.

== Gameplay ==
Tale of Immortal has five difficulty levels ranging from "normal" to "chaos", with the last mode being a permadeath mode which will delete the player's save upon death. There is a character creator which allows customizing the player character, as well as a choice of up to three initial "destinies" which influence the character's starting stats. The game uses a square tile-based movement system, with travel time counted in days. Player actions such as stealing items or killing rivals can result in consequences later, which will affect interactions with various NPCs. Combat takes the form of a top-down action RPG with bullet hell mechanics. The player can equip "manuals" which enable various skills such as elemental attacks or martial-arts styles, and equip passive "mind skills" to power up active abilities.

The game also features a social system in which the player can build relationships with NPCs, including romance, adopting disciples, and reputation for actions such as committing crimes, which can result in the player gaining nemeses.

== Release ==
The game was initially only available in Chinese, with one review from TheGamer indicating that an English translation would likely arrive, and the translation was officially announced in a Steam update on March 6, 2021, to be released the following month. Tale of Immortal later received a release for mobile on July 15, 2025.

== Reception ==
GamerSky complimented the immersion and the developer's updates to the game. It was believed by author yjyj98879 that the cultivation system was handled well, and that the art style was appealing. Similarly, Rock Paper Shotgun noted its artwork as "lush" and as if it were "painted in water colour on parchment."

Tale of Immortal had over 180,000 players on Steam following its initial release in January 2021, and held a "very positive" rating on Steam, with Eurogamer noting that it briefly surpassed Grand Theft Auto V and Apex Legends on Steam's "most-played" list.
