= The Scroll of Taiwu: Beyond The Dome =

2018 video game

The Scroll of Taiwu: Beyond the Dome
- Early access cover art on Steam
- Developer: ConchShip Games
- Publisher: ConchShip Games
- Platform: Windows
- Release: September 18, 2018; English Release: WW: June 17, 2026
- Genres: role-playing, strategy
- Mode: single-player

The Scroll of Taiwu: Beyond the Dome (Chinese: 太吾绘卷：天幕心帷) is a 2018 indie Chinese role-playing video game released by Kunming-based studio ConchShip Games. It was released in early access in September 2018 as The Scroll of Taiwu (太吾绘卷) without an English translation.

The game is based on Wuxia martial arts and philosophies, andChinese mythology, combining elements from roleplaying, roguelike, and management gaming genres. In September 2018, the game ranked second in Steam's global sales charts, ahead of many popular Western games. It was seen as a harbinger of China's potential influence on the platform, which had not been formally opened to the region, and a bellwether for the burgeoning Chinese indie game scene.

An English version was released in 2026.

== Gameplay ==
Players take on the role of descendants of the Taiwu family, who must navigate a world populated with randomly generated NPCs and enemies, on a randomized map. Players can choose to form bonds of brotherhood or become sworn enemies with other characters, establish a village, run a variety of businesses, or even settle down by romancing a partner and starting a family. Whether one chooses to be virtuous or malicious, their actions shape the outcome of their journey. This focus on player choice, from what techniques to study to what role they wish to play in society, shows how the game's systems and design philosophies themselves embody wuxia, as opposed to the common Western use of wuxia at a superficial level.

The Scroll of Taiwu uses permadeath and generational inheritance as a way to pass knowledge and skills across a long time scale, making the player's journey multi-generational.

Players ultimately face off against the greatest enemy of the Taiwu family to determine the fate of their world, by utilizing unique martial art skills they've learned from various sects and gangs as they explored.

== Development ==
In April 2022, ConchShip Games announced that The Scroll of Taiwu official version would be released on September 21, 2022. In September of the same year, they announced on social media that a "new version" of The Scroll of Taiwu would be updated on September 21 at 23:00.

On August 19, 2025, ConchShip Games announced that the game would end its early access for Chinese New Year 2026 with numerous updates, such as new UI and three new storylines, as well as the release of the official English edition.

On June 17, 2026, after eight years in early access and over 3.4 million players within China, The Scroll of Taiwu became available in English with the game's 1.0 release.
