= SCS Software =

Video game developer from the Czech Republic

SCS Software s.r.o.
- Type: Private
- Industry: Video games
- Founded: 1997; 29 years ago
- Headquarters: Prague, Czech Republic
- Area served: Worldwide
- Key people: Pavel Šebor (CEO); Martin Cesky; Petr Šebor
- Products: 18 Wheels of Steel; Truck Simulator
- Revenue: 556,889,000 Czech koruna (2019)
- Operating income: 363,618,000 Czech koruna (2019)
- Net income: 298,456,000 Czech koruna (2019)
- Total assets: 1,125,254,000 Czech koruna (2019)
- Number of employees: 400 (2025)
- Website: scssoft.com

SCS Software s.r.o. is a video game developer based in Prague, Czech Republic. It primarily produces simulation games for Microsoft Windows, macOS, and Linux, including the 18 Wheels of Steel and Truck Simulator series. The name is an initialism based on the surnames of the three founders, Pavel Šebor, Martin Český and Petr Šebor.

== Games ==
=== Bus Driver ===
SCS released a bus driving simulator, Bus Driver, in 2007. Later in 2014, an iOS version of Bus Driver was released, Bus Driver – Pocket Edition.

=== Hunting Unlimited ===
The Hunting Unlimited series consists of games Hunting Unlimited, Hunting Unlimited 2, Hunting Unlimited 3, Hunting Unlimited 4, Hunting Unlimited 2008, Hunting Unlimited 2009 and Hunting Unlimited 2010.

Hunting Unlimited 2 was released on 30 September 2003.

=== 18 Wheels of Steel ===
The 18 Wheels of Steel series primarily focuses on North America. The series was published by ValuSoft from 2002, with Hard Truck: 18 Wheels of Steel, to 2011, with 18 Wheels of Steel: Extreme Trucker 2.

=== Truck Simulator ===
The Truck Simulator series includes Euro Truck Simulator, published in 2008 and its sequel game, Euro Truck Simulator 2, which was released in 2012. Both games focus on truck/lorry driving in European countries, such as the United Kingdom, Germany, the Czech Republic, Luxembourg, Italy, France, Belgium, the Netherlands, Austria, and Switzerland. SCS Software has released a number of maps as downloadable content (DLC) for Euro Truck Simulator 2. The first DLC, "Going East!" was released in late 2013, and includes a number of Central European countries; adding Hungary and expanding on the Czech Republic, Slovakia and Poland. A further map expansion for Scandinavia; including Denmark, Norway and Sweden; was released on 6 May 2015. The update also included licensed Mercedes-Benz trademarks and branding. Further map DLCs included "Vive la France" on 5 December 2016 expanding further into France, and "Italia" on 5 December 2017 adding to the game's coverage of Italy. Released on 29 November 2018, "Beyond the Baltic Sea" expanded across Latvia, Lithuania, Estonia, and parts of Russia and Finland, and "Road to the Black Sea" added Romania, Bulgaria, and the Thrace region of Turkey on 5 December 2019. "Iberia", released 8 April 2021, added Spain and Portugal. Future plans as of 2023 include "West Balkans" and "Heart of Russia" DLCs, although the latter has been delayed indefinitely due to concerns over the 2022 Russian invasion of Ukraine.

Following the success of the Euro Truck Simulator series, SCS announced that the next game in the series would be American Truck Simulator, which was released on 2 February 2016. The game currently covers the entire western U.S. states in the lower 48, including part of the south central and midwestern regions of California, Nevada, Arizona, New Mexico, Oregon, Washington, Utah, Idaho, Colorado, Wyoming, Montana, Texas, Oklahoma, Kansas, Nebraska, Arkansas, Missouri, Iowa, Louisiana and Illinois. The game features licensed American conventional trucks; including models by Peterbilt, Kenworth, Volvo, International, Mack, Western Star, and Freightliner. The game originally released with California and Nevada, with the state of Arizona releasing as a free DLC to owners of the game in June 2016 and New Mexico releasing as paid DLC in November 2017. Almost a year later in October 2018, the state of Oregon was also released as a paid DLC. Then, on 11 June 2019, the state of Washington was added as paid DLC alongside the Forest Machinery cargo pack DLC, with Utah releasing on 7 November 2019, which allowed the base map to square up with the beehive state. The state of Idaho was released on 16 July 2020. The state of Colorado was released on 12 November 2020. Then the state of Wyoming was released on 7 September 2021. The state of Montana was released on 4 August 2022 to mark the end of an era to the completion of the entire Western Region in the lower 48. Not long afterwards the US state of Texas was released on 15 November 2022. Almost 9 months later, the state of Oklahoma was released on 1 August 2023, which allowed Texas to square up with the sooner state. Nearly 4 months later, the state of Kansas along with the Farm Machinery cargo pack DLC was released on 30 November 2023. Nearly half a year later, the state of Nebraska along with the Sport Paint Jobs Pack DLC was released on 16 May 2024. Four months later, the state of Arkansas was released alongside an update for the Forest Machinery cargo pack DLC on 16 September 2024. Over half a year later, the state of Missouri was released on 3 April 2025. Three months later, the state of Iowa was released alongside an update for the Farm Machinery cargo pack DLC on 10 July 2025. Nearly five months later, the state of Louisiana was released on 4 December 2025. Five months later, the state of Illinois was released on 14 May 2026. Just over four months later, the state of South Dakota was released 24 September 2026. Future states and map add-ons (such as North Dakota, Indiana and a first time Canada welcome to British Columbia) will be sold as paid DLC.

=== Games developed ===
Title	Platform(s)	Initial release
Hunting Unlimited	Microsoft Windows	October 2001
Hard Truck: 18 Wheels of Steel	Microsoft Windows	15 August 2002
18 Wheels of Steel: Across America	Microsoft Windows	23 September 2003
Hunting Unlimited 2	Microsoft Windows	30 September 2003
Hunting Unlimited 3	Microsoft Windows	24 August 2004
18 Wheels of Steel: Pedal to the Metal	Microsoft Windows	30 August 2004
OceanDive	Microsoft Windows	8 March 2005
18 Wheels of Steel: Convoy	Microsoft Windows	6 September 2005
Hunting Unlimited 4	Microsoft Windows	18 September 2006
18 Wheels of Steel: Haulin'	Microsoft Windows	18 September 2006
Bus Driver	Microsoft Windows, OS X, iOS	22 March 2007
Deer Drive	Microsoft Windows	24 April 2007
Hunting Unlimited 2008	Microsoft Windows	1 September 2007
18 Wheels of Steel: American Long Haul	Microsoft Windows	3 December 2007
Hunting Unlimited 2009	Microsoft Windows	23 July 2008
Euro Truck Simulator	Microsoft Windows, OS X	6 August 2008
Hunting Unlimited 2010	Microsoft Windows	7 July 2009
18 Wheels of Steel: Extreme Trucker	Microsoft Windows	23 September 2009
German Truck Simulator	Microsoft Windows	13 January 2010
UK Truck Simulator	Microsoft Windows	19 February 2010
18 Wheels of Steel: Extreme Trucker 2	Microsoft Windows	6 January 2011
Trucks & Trailers	Microsoft Windows	17 July 2011
Scania Truck Driving Simulator	Microsoft Windows, OS X	13 June 2012
Euro Truck Simulator 2	Microsoft Windows, OS X, Linux	18 October 2012
American Truck Simulator	Microsoft Windows, OS X, Linux	2 February 2016
