= Dead Man's Diary =

2022 video game

- game cover art
- Developer: TML-Studios
- Publisher: TML-Studios
- Engine: Unreal Engine 4
- Platform: Microsoft Windows
- Release: 30 March 2022
- Genres: Adventure, Survival
- Mode: Single-player

Dead Man's Diary is an adventure-survival video game developed and published by TML-Studios. The game was released for Microsoft Windows on 30 March 2022.

== Gameplay ==
The game is set in a post-apocalyptic wasteland where the Earth is destroyed fifteen years after nuclear holocaust. Players would be portrayed as a survivor, who have to survive the hostile world by crafting items and finding safe places to eat and sleep without using weapons. In addition to the survival mode, the game would also feature a puzzle mode that contains twenty-seven levels.

== Development and release ==
The game is developed and published by the German-based game studio TML-Studios, who is known for the bus simulation titles such as Fernbus Simulator, Tourist Bus Simulator and The Bus. The game was available for Microsoft Windows on 30 March 2022 via video game digital distribution Steam. Console versions are confirmed to be launched later in 2022.

== Reception ==
Reception

Review score
Publication	Score
IGN Greece	4.5/10

Upon release, Dead Man's Diary received praised for its graphics, environment, and story.
