= Fernbus Simulator =

2016 vehicle simulation video game

- Cover art of the game featuring a MAN Lion's Coach
- Developer: TML-Studios
- Publisher: Aerosoft
- Engine: Unreal Engine 4
- Platforms: Microsoft Windows; Xbox Series X/S; PlayStation 5
- Release: Windows; 25 August 2016; PlayStation 5, Xbox Series X/S; 28 February 2023
- Genre: Vehicle simulation
- Mode: Single-player

Fernbus Simulator (also known as Fernbus Coach Simulator), is a bus simulator game developed by TML-Studios and published by Aerosoft for Microsoft Windows. The game was released worldwide on 25 August 2016.

== Gameplay ==
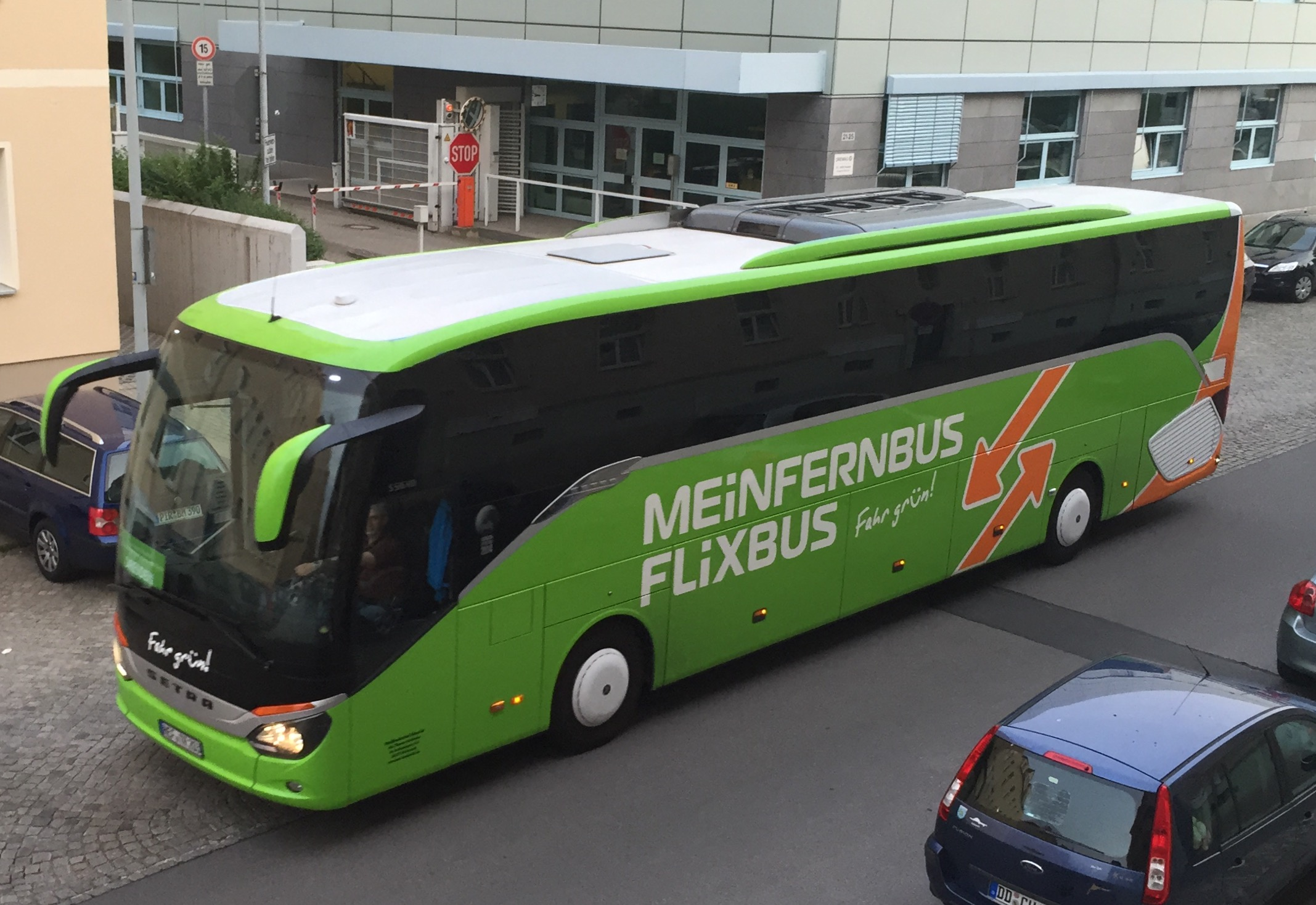
The game simulates the FlixBus.

Fernbus Simulator is set in Germany, offering a route network of approximately 20,000 kilometres and 40 German cities that is built on a scale of 1:10. More city routes were released as DLCs, expanding the map to the following countries: Austria, Switzerland, France, Luxembourg, Netherlands, Belgium, Czech Republic, Denmark, Poland, and England.

The game features similar gameplay to Euro Truck Simulator 2, and includes construction sites, traffic congestion, police patrols, traffic collision, and dynamic weather and day-night cycles. The game also provides various licensed buses from MAN, VDL, Scania, and Neoplan that FlixBus uses for their fleet, allowing players to drive them on highly detailed German motorways.

=== Downloadable content ===
==== Map expansions ====
TML has released several map expansion DLC packs that includes new countries.

Name	Included content	Release date
Usedom	The seaside resort of Ahlbeck and the town of Usedom	14 November 2017
Austria / Switzerland	Countries of Switzerland and Austria	5 April 2018
Rennsteig	Adds Rennsteig to Central Germany	25 April 2019
France	Country of France	18 October 2019
Rhine Gorge	Rhine Gorge area	21 October 2019
Luxembourg	Country of Luxembourg	12 December 2019
Netherlands	Country of Netherlands	15 December 2020
Bavarian Castle	Neuschwanstein Castle area	18 December 2020
Belgium	Country of Belgium	20 May 2021
Czechia	Country of Czechia	7 April 2022
Denmark	Country of Denmark	26 June 2023
Poland	Country of Poland	21 March 2024
England	Country of England	3 September 2026

==== Vehicle add-ons ====
Name	Included content	Release date
Neoplan Skyliner	Neoplan Skyliner bus	23 March 2017
Comfort Class HD	5 variants of the Setra ComfortClass HD (unlicensed)	29 November 2017
VDL Futura FHD2	6 variants of the VDL Futura FHD2	25 April 2019
MAN Lion's Intercity	3 variants of the MAN Lion's Intercity	October 2019
BB40	Toyota Coaster mini-bus (unlicensed)	2 December 2019
MAN Lion's Coach 3rd Gen	4 variants of the MAN Lion's Coach 3rd Gen	28 August 2020
Scania Touring	3 variants of the Scania Touring	5 December 2020
W906	Mercedes-Benz Sprinter mini-bus (unlicensed)	29 May 2020
VDL Futura FDD2	2 variants of VDL Futura FDD2 double-decker bus	9 February 2021
Altano TX	3 variants of Van Hool Altano TX (unlicensed)	20 December 2023
Altano TDX	Van Hool Altano TDX20 & TDX 21 (unlicensed)	20 December 2023
Astromega	Van Hool Astromega TDX25 & TDX 27 (unlicensed)	20 December 2023

==== Football Team Bus DLC ====
This game expansion/mode was released on 30 August 2018. In this mode, which is unlockable by purchasing Fußball Mannschaftsbus DLC, players have to choose one of 18 football clubs based on the German football league and drive its players to their guest matches. All of the stadiums are fully recreated, and there is also a repaint for MAN Lion's Coach bus included. The player's job is to manage the allocated budget wisely until the end of the season so that the team bus can be maintained, cleaned, and the team can be supplied with sufficient snacks and beverages.

== Development and release ==
Fernbus Simulator was developed by German-based game studio TML-Studios, the developers of the City Bus Simulator series and the World of Subways franchise. It is powered by Unreal Engine 4 of Epic Games. The game was released on 25 August 2016 for Microsoft Windows.

== Reception ==
The game is sold on the digital distribution platform Steam. It has a mixed review rating. The game is often compared with Euro Truck Simulator 2 and American Truck Simulator. The design of the game has been praised in terms of atmosphere, motorways, residential areas and detailed bus cockpits. However, bugs, missing textures, insufficient realism and a lack of long-term motivation are common criticisms.
