= Tourist Bus Simulator =

2018 vehicle simulation video game

- cover art of the game featuring a MAN Lion's Coach
- Developer: TML-Studios
- Publisher: Aerosoft
- Engine: Unreal Engine 4
- Platforms: Microsoft Windows; PlayStation 5; Xbox Series X/S
- Release: Microsoft Windows; 6 December 2018; PlayStation 5, Xbox Series X/S; 12 May 2022
- Genre: Vehicle simulation
- Mode: Single-player

Tourist Bus Simulator is a bus simulator game developed by TML-Studios and published by Aerosoft for Microsoft Windows. The game is powered by Unreal Engine 4 and was initially available on 6 December 2018 worldwide. It is set in Fuerteventura of the Canary Islands, featuring a total of twenty recreated cities, beaches and locations such as the Fuerteventura Airport. The main licensed vehicle in the game that offers to the player is MAN Lion's Coach, as well as other off-road and service vehicle.

== Gameplay ==
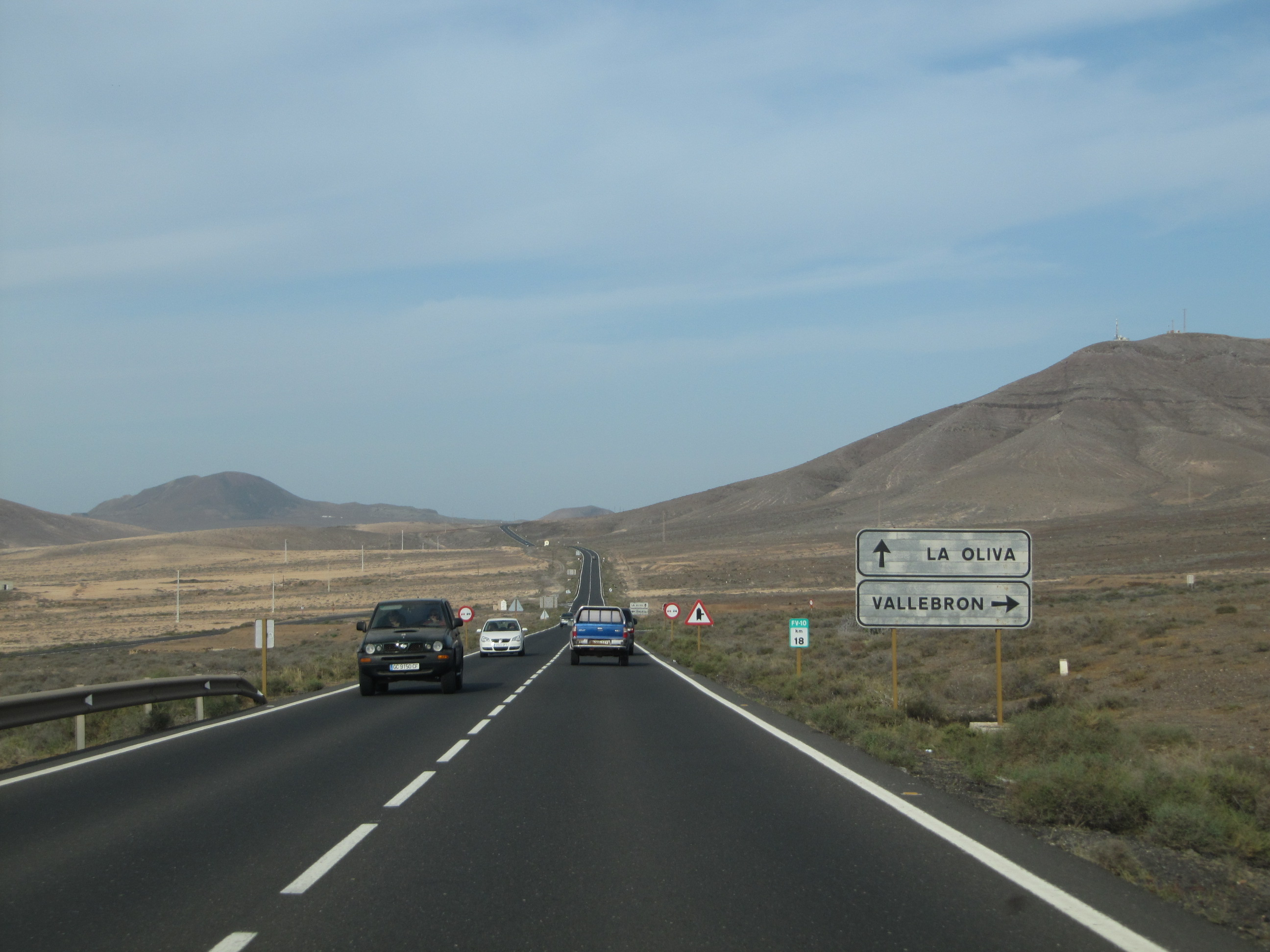
FV-10 is one of the real roads that is recreated in the game.

The game is set in 1:5 scale recreation of Fuerteventura of the Canary Islands, featuring a total of twenty recreated cities, beaches and locations such as the Fuerteventura Airport. The main licensed vehicle in the game that offers to the player is MAN Lion's Coach, as well as other off-road and service vehicle.

When starting out, players choose what mode they want to play. There is freeplay mode, which gives the player ability to choose their own route, bus and weather. The other mode offers a harder experience, there is a tutorial, which takes around an hour to complete. In this mode, player takes control of a newly acquired bus company located near Fuerteventura’s airport. From the comfort of the office, the player can hire staff and negotiate their wages and then assign routes – or go hands-on themselves. Some routes are permanent, providing a steady supply of money, while others are one-offs. Employees must be kept happy, and vehicles maintained – the compound also houses a garage where repairs can be carried out. Players can own apartments, decorate and furnish them. By getting XP and completing levels, the player eventually unlocks shuttle service and emergency callout vehicle. By completing a side bonus quest a dirt buggy can be unlocked too, parts for which are hidden and scattered across the isle.

== Development and release ==
The game is developed with Unreal Engine 4 by the German-based game studio TML-Studios, who had previously released Fernbus Simulator. The game was initially released for Microsoft Windows on 6 December 2018. The console versions of PlayStation 5 and Xbox Series X/S were launched on 12 May 2022. The game was released for Xbox Series X and Series S and PlayStation 5 on 12 May 2023. Porting was done by a company Zero Games.

== Reception ==
The console version had a very negative reception due to many technical bugs and lack of updates to the game.
