= C4 Engine =

Proprietary computer game engine developed by Terathon Software

- Developer: Terathon Software LLC
- Stable release: Version 7.2 / September 3, 2024; 23 months ago
- Platform: PlayStation 5 PlayStation 4 Xbox One; Microsoft Windows
- Type: Game engine
- License: Multiple types
- Website: c4engine.com

The C4 Engine is a proprietary computer game engine developed by Terathon Software that is used to create 3D games and other types of interactive virtual simulations for PlayStation 5, PlayStation 4, PlayStation 3, Windows (XP and later), Mac OS X (versions 10.9 and later), Linux, and iOS.

== Development history ==
Development of the C4 Engine is led by computer graphics author Eric Lengyel, who is also the founder of Terathon Software. Although in development sporadically for several years beforehand, the engine was first made available under a commercial license in May, 2005. Due to changing market conditions, the C4 Engine was retired in 2015, but an announcement has been made that it is returning in 2021. C4 Engine version 7.0 is released on 22 March 2023.

== Capabilities and features ==
The architecture of the C4 Engine is that of a layered collection of software components, in which the lowest layers interact with the computer hardware and operating system, and the higher layers provide platform-independent services to the game code. While a considerable portion of the engine is dedicated to 3D graphics, there are also large components dedicated to functionality pertaining to audio, networking, physics, input devices, and scripting. Documentation for the engine is available online through a set of API web pages and a wiki.

=== Graphics ===
The C4 Engine is based on the OpenGL library on Windows, Mac, Linux, and iOS platforms, and it uses a one-pass-per-light forward rendering model. The engine is capable of rendering with several different types of light sources and shadowing methods. The primary method for rendering dynamic shadows is shadow mapping, and a variant of cascaded shadow mapping is used for very large outdoor scenes.

Shaders are created in C4 using one of two available methods, both of which isolate the user from the shader code required by the underlying graphics library. Simple shaders can be created by specifying a set of material attributes such as a diffuse reflection color, a specular reflection color, and a group of texture maps. The engine internally generates the necessary shader code for each combination of material and light type that it encounters when rendering a scene. Material attributes can be used to produce effects such as normal mapping, parallax mapping, horizon mapping, and bumpy reflections or refractions.

C4 also includes a graphical Shader Editor that allows complex custom materials to be created using a large set of predefined operations. This method of designing materials enables greater creative freedom and functionality for expert users, but requires somewhat more work by the user. Materials created using the standard material attributes can be converted to custom shaders to serve as a starting point in the Shader Editor.

The terrain capabilities of the C4 Engine are based on a voxel technology, allowing full 3D sculpting to produce features such as overhangs, arches, and truly vertical cliffs that would not be possible under a conventional height-based terrain system. Triangle meshes are generated from voxel data using the Marching cubes algorithm, and seamless multiresolution level of detail is made possible by using the Transvoxel algorithm to stitch together regions of differing resolutions.

The engine is capable of rendering a large variety of special effects, including particle systems, procedural fire, electrical effects, volumetric fog, and weather phenomena. During a post-processing stage, the engine can also apply full-scene cinematic motion blur to the final image using a technique based on a velocity buffer, as well as glow and distortion effects. The engine does not provide the capability to design custom post-processing effects.

=== Audio ===
The C4 Engine can play sounds stored in the WAV format using 16-bit mono or stereo sampling, and audio data can be played from memory or streamed from disk. The engine plays sounds using a custom mixer that provides capabilities such as frequency shifting, Doppler effect, reverberation, and atmospheric absorption.

=== Networking ===
Multiplayer gameplay in C4 is supported by a two-layer messaging system that uses the User Datagram Protocol to communicate among different computers connected to a game.

=== Physics ===
The C4 Engine has a native physics engine which can be used or allows the option for implementing a 3rd party solution instead.

== Tools ==
The C4 Engine ships with basic game development tools required to make a modern game. Each tool is packaged as a plugin module that exists separately from the engine itself. Many tools make use of the comprehensive graphical user interface system provided by the engine so that a consistent interface is presented to the user across multiple platforms.

=== World Editor ===
The World Editor tool is a 3D content creation application that is typically used to create game environments for use with the C4 Engine. It provides a large set of drawing and manipulation capabilities that are used to construct world geometry as well as many game necessities such as lights, sounds, triggers, and special effects.

The World Editor can import scene information through the OpenGEX and COLLADA formats. This enables the use of content from a large number of digital content creation programs such as Autodesk Maya or 3D Studio Max.

=== Script editor ===
The World Editor tool includes a graphical script editor designed to be accessible to artists and level designers as well as programmers. The script editor allows the user to place various "methods" into a directed graph connected by "fibers" representing action dependencies and the order of execution. Scripts support loops through the creation of cycles in the graph structure, and conditional execution is supported by marking fibers to be followed or not followed based on the result value output by the methods at which they start.

The engine ships with several standard script methods that perform simple actions such as enabling or disabling a scene node (for example, to turn a light on or off) and more complex actions such as evaluating an arbitrary mathematical expression. New script methods can be defined by the game code, and they appear in the script editor as custom actions that can be used by a level designer.

=== Panel editor ===
The World Editor tool includes a sub-editor called the "panel editor" providing for the creation of 2D interface panels that can be placed inside a 3D world. The panel editor lets the user place various types of widgets such as text and images in a panel effect node that is rendered as part of the scene. Panels can also include a special camera widget that displays the scene that is visible to a camera placed anywhere else in the same world.

Interface panels are both dynamic and interactive. The engine provides an extensible set of "mutators" that can be applied to individual panel items to induce various forms of animation such as scrolling, rotation, or color change. A character in a game can interact with a panel by approaching it and clicking the mouse inside interactive items. Script can be attached to such items, causing a sequence of actions to occur when the player activates them.

== Licensing ==
The C4 Engine is licensed for $100 per person, and this includes all future updates at no additional cost.

== Academics ==
The C4 Engine has been licensed by many universities in connection with games-oriented software engineering curricula or for special research projects. These universities include MIT, Georgia Tech, Worcester Polytechnic Institute (WPI), McMaster University, and the University of Kempten. Students in some of these programs are required to create their own games as part of a course using the C4 Engine, and many of these projects have gone on to be entered in the Independent Games Festival student competition.

One particular university research project involved the TactaVest technology developed at WPI, and their use of the C4 Engine was featured in the Discovery Channel Canada television show Daily Planet airing on May 26, 2006.

== Games using C4 ==
Games that use the C4 Engine include:

- Fat Princess Adventures for PlayStation 4
- World of Subways
- City Bus Simulator 2010
- Lego Wolf3D
- Quest of Persia: Lotfali Khan Zand
- The 31st
- Utility Vehicle Simulator 2012
- Bridge! The Construction Game
- Rolling
- Wingball
- Ludicrous
- Gremlin Invasion
- Gremlin Invasion: Survivor
- 1 Carnaval De Distorções
- Tauchfahrt zur Titanic
- Bounce!
- The Visible Dark
- World Hunter
- Rabbit
- GreySoul
- World Of Subways Volume 2: U7 Berlin
