= Quest for Glory V: Dragon Fire =

1998 video game

- Developer: Yosemite Entertainment
- Publisher: Sierra FX
- Producer: Jay D. Usher
- Designer: Lori Ann Cole
- Programmers: Eric Lengyel; Larry Scott
- Artists: Jon Bock; Terry Robinson
- Composer: Chance Thomas
- Series: Quest for Glory
- Platforms: Windows, Macintosh
- Release: December 8, 1998
- Genre: Action role-playing game
- Mode: Single-player

Quest for Glory V: Dragon Fire is the fifth and final game in the Quest for Glory computer game series by Sierra FX, a former "sub brand" of Sierra On-Line. Unlike the first four games, Dragon Fire is primarily an action role-playing game with some elements of graphical adventure.

== Gameplay ==
Dragon Fire retains its point-and-click graphical interface and introduces a new combat system. Previous entries had moved combat encounters to a separate, isolated combat screen, but Quest for Glory V's interface allows for these battles to take place in the same environment as the rest of the gameplay.

For the first time in the franchise, Quest for Glory V partially transitions to 3D: unlike prior entries, the last instalment employs polygonal 3D for its virtual characters, while retaining its two-dimensional, pre-rendered visuals for both backgrounds and objects. This makes the last instalment of the series one of the earliest adopters of a 3D character creation system, with such technology predating the popular role-playing games EverQuest and Asheron's Call.

Quest for Glory V provides more variety in the form of story paths, side-quests, and puzzles than its predecessors.

== Plot ==
The wizard Erasmus introduces the player character, the Hero, to the Greece-like kingdom of Silmaria, whose king was recently assassinated. Thus, the traditional Rites of Rulership are due to commence, and the victor will be crowned king. The Hero enters the contest with the assistance of Erasmus, Rakeesh, and many old friends from previous entries in the series. The Hero competes against competitors, including the Silmarian guard Kokeeno Pookameeso, the warlord Magnum Opus, the hulking Gort, and the warrior Elsa Von Spielburg, who played a significant role in the first game.

As the Rites commence, an unknown assassin begins systematically picking off the contestants. Each contestant is murdered by a poison dagger, and they all are murdered near Dragon Pillars, the objects used to keep the Dragon of Silmaria locked up. After completing the second Rite, defeating the General of the Mercenaries, Rakeesh is attacked by the assassin and, depending on the course of action chosen by the player, either lives or dies. The conspiracy is eventually unraveled and the Dragon, having been released due to the destruction of the Dragon Pillars, is defeated.

The characters Katrina and Erana make a return in this installment, as assistance for defeating the Dragon.

This installment also marks the return of Bruno, a character from the first Quest for Glory game. He is revealed to be the assassin who has been terrorizing the streets of Silmaria, characterized as a quiet, shady character until he reveals himself to the player.

Silmaria Marketplace

== Development ==
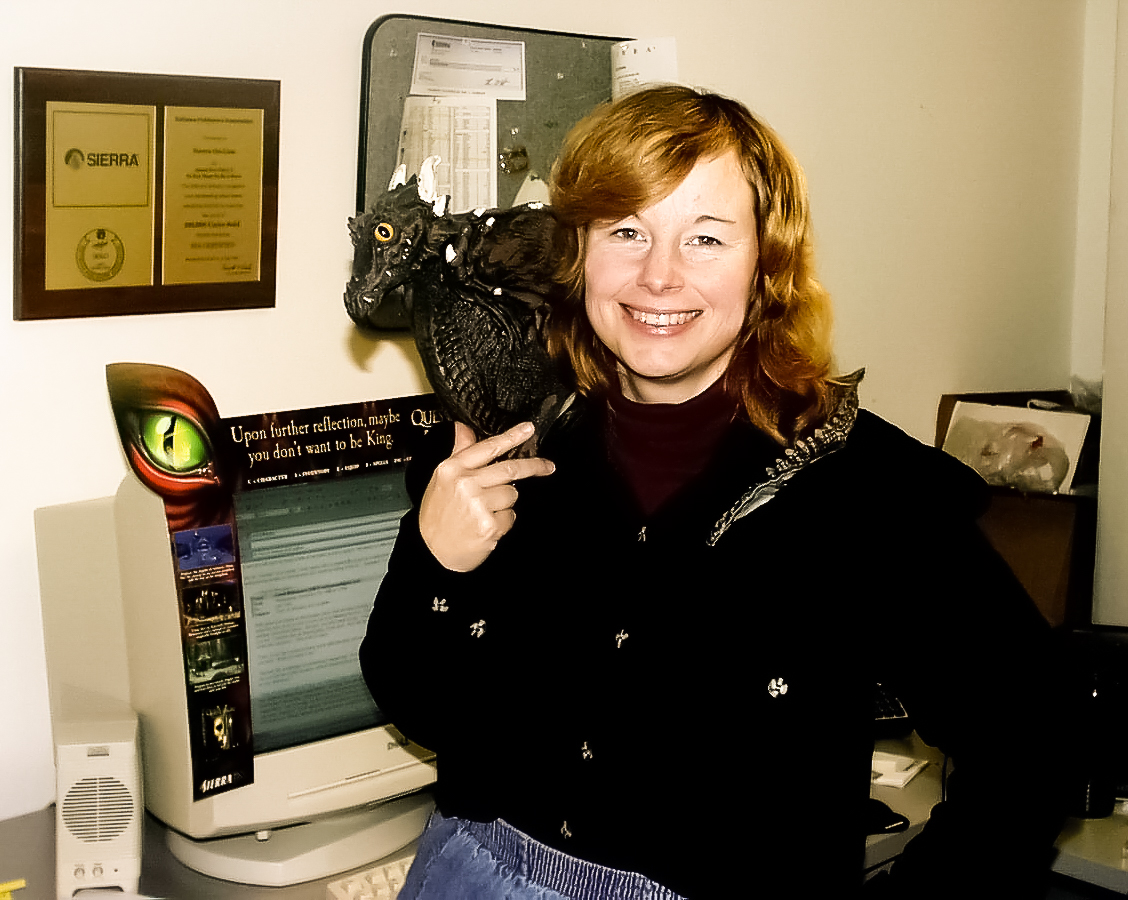
Lori Ann Cole, game designer

The first four games were intended to indicate the four elements and the four wind directions: in the first game, the player is the Hero from the East, in the second, the hero from the North, etc. Dragon Fire was always planned to be part of the series (whereas Wages of War originally was not), but it would not have been produced if not for fans' enthusiasm and their pleas to Sierra On-Line.

The game originally had a voxel engine, which was later changed to a 3D engine because of hardware limitations. According to Corey Cole, Lori Cole was predominantly responsible for the game's design, as he was preoccupied with programming on the game.

Because of deadline issues and financial pressures, several features were dropped from the fifth game before release, such as the ability to use a bow, the ability to play as Elsa von Spielburg or Magnum Opus (two prominent non-player characters from the game), and multiplayer capability. A demo released in late 1997 contained a multiplayer game, but Sierra decided to remove it from the final product. Yosemite Entertainment, the development team responsible for the game, was closed on February 22, 1999.

The fifth game is arguably a different genre from the first four; while the first four are mostly adventure games incorporating role-playing elements, the fifth game is a role-playing game incorporating some adventure elements. For instance, the fifth game has a wide variety of weapons, armor, and magical items, whereas the first four do not. Also, in the fifth game nearly every major mission consists of going to some place and defeating some monster in physical or magical combat. Additionally, the controls and battle system are substantially different from those of the first four games and different from the fourth's side-scrolling, fighting game-like combat as well.

Also differentiating the fifth game from the first four are a new graphics engine programmed by Eric Lengyel and a soundtrack by Emmy-winning composer Chance Thomas, which was released on CD. Some tracks were made available for free download from MP3.com.

=== Compatibility ===
There is an official patch for the game itself, fixing several problems. To run this game under Windows XP, the compatibility mode can either be set to Windows 98 or a fan-made patch can be applied.

There is an official installer named "New Quest for Glory V installer". This installer allows the game to be played without a disc and on modern versions of Windows.

=== Re-release ===
The Quest for Glory I–V Collection released by Activision through GOG.com includes all the games including QFG5 patched to run on modern Vista and Windows 7 PCs.

== Reception ==
Reception

Aggregate score
Aggregator	Score
GameRankings	73%

Review scores
Publication	Score
MacAddict	"Freakin' Awesome!"
MacHome Journal	5/5
Computer Games Strategy Plus	3.5/5
PC Games	B+

Chance Thomas' soundtrack was released alongside a demo prior to Dragon Fire's launch. This soundtrack sold 50,000 copies and made $500,000.

The game received mixed reactions from players, although "critics tended to be kind to the game". Next Generation summarized it as "a fine contribution to the genre that is accessible to novice and expert gamers alike." Joshua Darien Maciel of RPGamer scored the game 9 out of 10 points, considering it a polished and seamless combination of combat and gameplay.

Dragon Fire was a nominee for CNET Gamecenter's 1998 "Adventure Game of the Year" award, which ultimately went to Grim Fandango. The editors wrote, "What Dragon Fire does really well is give traditional adventure gamers a place to call home."

=== Retrospective ===
G4TV's Adam Rosenberg considers Quest for Glory V: Dragon Fire the best entry in the series. Griffin McElroy of Polygon positively characterised the game as "fan service" for fans of its predecessors. Rowan Kaizer of Engadget considers this entry the worst of the series, largely due to its use of primitive 3D graphics.
