= Eric Lengyel =

American developer

Eric Lengyel is a computer scientist specializing in computer graphics, game engine development, and geometric algebra. He holds a Ph.D. in computer science from the University of California, Davis and a master's degree in mathematics from Virginia Tech, where he also competed in cross-country and track and field.

Lengyel is an expert in font rendering technology for 3D applications and is the inventor of the Slug font rendering algorithm, which allows glyphs to be rendered directly from outline data on the GPU with full resolution independence. Lengyel is also the inventor of the Transvoxel algorithm, which is used to seamlessly join multiresolution voxel data at boundaries between different levels of detail that have been triangulated with the Marching cubes algorithm. Most recently, Lengyel created the professional equation editing software called Radical Pie, which utilizes his previous work on font rendering.

Among his many written contributions to the field of game development, Lengyel is the author of the four-volume book series Foundations of Game Engine Development. The first volume, covering the mathematics of game engines, was published in 2016 and is now known for its unique treatment of Grassmann algebra. The second volume, covering a wide range of rendering topics, was published in 2019. Lengyel is also the author of the textbook Mathematics for 3D Game Programming and Computer Graphics and the editor for the three-volume Game Engine Gems book series.

Lengyel founded Terathon Software in 2000 and is currently President and Chief Technology Officer at the company, where he leads development of the C4 Engine. He has previously worked in the advanced technology group at Naughty Dog, and before that was the lead programmer for the fifth installment of Sierra's popular RPG adventure series Quest for Glory. In addition to the C4 Engine, Lengyel is the creator of the Open Data Description Language (OpenDDL) and the Open Game Engine Exchange (OpenGEX) file format.

Lengyel is originally from Reynoldsburg, Ohio, but now lives in Lincoln, California. He is a cousin of current Ohioan and "Evolution of Dance" creator Judson Laipply.

== Games ==
Eric Lengyel is credited on the following games:

- Heavenly Sword (2007), Sony Computer Entertainment America, Inc.
- Ratchet & Clank Future: Tools of Destruction (2007), Sony Computer Entertainment America, Inc.
- Warhawk (2007), Sony Computer Entertainment America, Inc.
- Formula One Championship Edition (2006), Sony Computer Entertainment America, Inc.
- MotorStorm (2006), Sony Computer Entertainment Incorporated
- Resistance: Fall of Man (2006), Sony Computer Entertainment Incorporated
- Jak 3 (2004), Sony Computer Entertainment America, Inc.
- Quest for Glory V: Dragon Fire (1998), Sierra On-Line, Inc.

== Patents ==
Eric Lengyel is the primary inventor on the following patents:

- Method for rendering resolution-independent shapes directly from outline control points
- Graphics processing apparatus, graphics library module and graphics processing method
