= City Bus Simulator 2010 =

2009 video game

- Developer(s): TML-Studios
- Publisher(s): Aerosoft
- Engine: C4 Engine
- Platform(s): Windows
- Genre(s): Bus simulation

City Bus Simulator 2010 is a game by TML Studios. It was released in the 3rd quarter of 2009. There is a demo version of the game which is available on their website. It simulates the M42 bus line, operated by the MTA, from the Circle Line or the Jacob Javits Center to the UN Headquarters (though the Javits branch has since been discontinued by the MTA). It goes through Times Square and by the Grand Central Terminal. The player drives a typical Nova Bus RTS with multiple views inside and outside of the bus.

City Bus Simulator Ingame
