= World of Subways =

World of Subways is a series of subway simulations created by TML-Studios. There are currently four volumes. All volumes are standalone programs and cannot be modified. Each volume has only one route included with no other routes available, with the exception of Volume 1; however, the total amount of drivable track in Volume 1 is significantly less than other volumes with only 13.8 miles included.

== World of Subways Volume 1: The PATH ==
World of Subways Volume 1: The PATH
- Developer: TML-Studios
- Publisher: Aerosoft
- Engine: C4 Engine
- Platform: Windows
- Release: September 20, 2008
- Genre: Subway simulation

Volume 1 takes place in the PATH (Port Authority Trans-Hudson) system. It covers the entire rail system of 22.2km (13.8mi) of track and 13 stations, which connects between the downtown areas in the borough of Manhattan in New York City and a few cities in the state of New Jersey. Usable rolling stock includes the refurbished PA2 and PA3 rail cars and the non-refurbished PA4 rail cars.

An expansion pack was released containing five new missions and additional options.

== World of Subways Volume 2: U7 - Berlin ==
World of Subways Volume 2: U7 - Berlin
- Developer: TML-Studios
- Publisher: Aerosoft
- Engine: C4 Engine
- Platform: Windows
- Release: February 2009
- Genre: Subway simulation

Volume 2 was the next product in continuing the World of Subways series. It takes place in the Berlin U-Bahn' U7 line, the longest line in the system, covering 31.8km (19.8mi) and 40 stations between Rathaus Spandau and Rudow. Unlike the other volumes, the entire route is underground. Usable rolling stock includes the F 90 and the H 01 subway cars.

== World of Subways Volume 3: London Underground Circle Line ==
World of Subways Volume 3: London Underground Circle Line
- Developer: TML-Studios
- Publishers: Aerosoft, Excalibur Publishing
- Engine: Vision Engine
- Platform: Windows
- Release: May 25, 2011
- Genre: Subway simulation

Volume 3 continues the World of Subways series with the Circle line service of the London Underground. The Circle Line covers 27km (16.8mi) of track and 35 stations, including the extension to Hammersmith, that runs above and below ground through London. The Circle Line operates in two directions: "Inner Rail" (anti-clockwise, Edgware Road - Hammersmith) and "Outer Rail" (clockwise, Hammersmith - Edgware Road).

Unlike the previous volumes, players have a visible character in third-person view, but the majority of the simulation is still in first-person view. Also unlike the previous versions, there is no exterior camera and the player can board and travel on other Circle line trains not controlled by the player. The only usable rolling stock is the C Stock subway cars. The D Stock is also included, which runs on the District line but the player can not board or control this type of rolling stock. The C Stock was also included on another line, the Hammersmith & City line, and again the player cannot board or control this train.

Unlike all the other volumes of this series, Volume 3 was published by Excalibur Publishing as well as Aerosoft.

The game was released in May 2011. World of Subways 3 was delisted on March 3, 2025, following the expiration of its licensing rights. The game is no longer available for purchase as its Steam page has been deactivated and the game removed from the Aerosoft website.

== World of Subways Volume 4: New York Line 7 ==
World of Subways Volume 4: New York Line 7
- Developer: TML-Studios
- Publisher: Aerosoft
- Engine: Vision Engine
- Platform: Windows
- Release: DVD-ROM: April 2, 2015 Download: March 23, 2015
- Genre: Subway simulation

Volume 4 was set on the New York City Subway system in New York City, based on the 7 service. Aerosoft, the publisher of the series, had initially announced that this edition would be set on a line on the Paris Métro. The game was released for download on March 23, 2015, and a physical release followed on April 2.

Volume 4 marked the first time the series was not set in the era of its release; instead, it was set in the late 1980s-early 1990s, when the R33S and R36 subway cars were still operational, and prior to the opening of 34th Street–Hudson Yards in 2015.
