= MAN Lion's Coach =

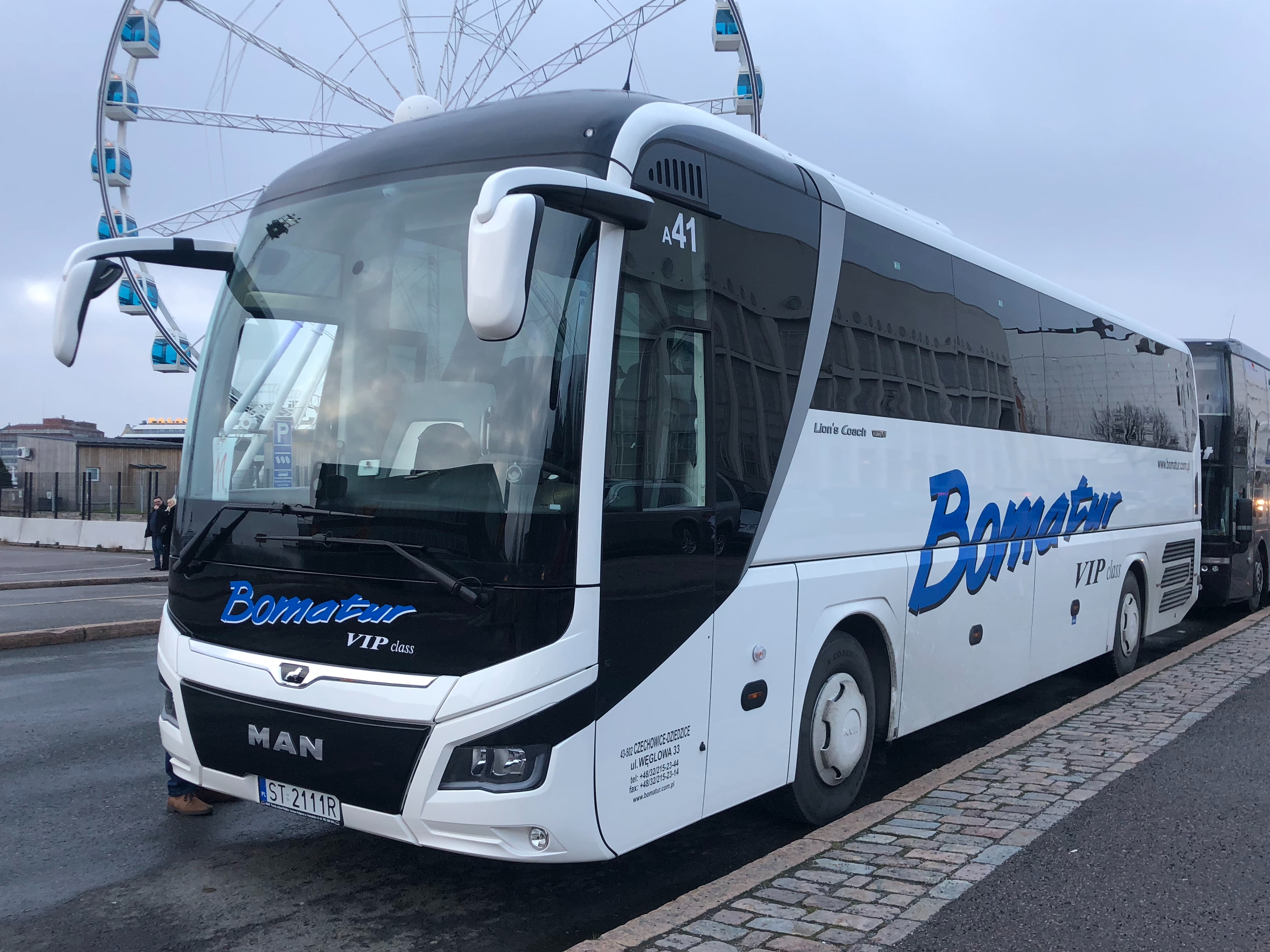
- Lion's Coach 3rd generation

Overview
- Manufacturer: MAN Truck & Bus / MANAŞ
- Also called: MAN Fortuna
- Production: 1996–present
- Assembly: Turkey: Ankara (MANAŞ)
- Designer: Stephan Schönherr

Body and chassis
- Class: Coach
- Doors: 2 doors
- Floor type: High Deck
- Related: Neoplan Tourliner

Powertrain
- Engine: MAN D2676LOH 12.4 liter common rail 6-cylinder diesel engine (Euro VI), vertically installed
- Capacity: 43 – 61 seats
- Power output: 2-axle models: 316kW or 346kW; 3-axle models: 346kW or 375kW
- Transmission: MAN TipMatic, automated 12-speed manual gearbox with EasyStart or 6-speed automatic gearbox

Dimensions
- Length: Lion’s Coach: 12,101 mm; Lion’s Coach C (2 axles): 13,091 mm; Lion’s Coach C (3 axles): 13,361 mm; Lion’s Coach L: 13,901 mm
- Width: 2,550 mm
- Height: 3,870 mm
- Curb weight: 19,700 kg – 25,530 kg

Chronology
- Predecessor: MAN SR 292; MAN SR 362

The MAN Lion's Coach is an integral coach manufactured by MAN Truck & Bus, and assembled by its subsidiary MANAŞ. Introduced in 1996, the coach was originally intended as a low-cost alternative to the MAN Lion's Star. In July 2020, the coach was awarded "Coach of the Year 2020" at the EMT Awards.

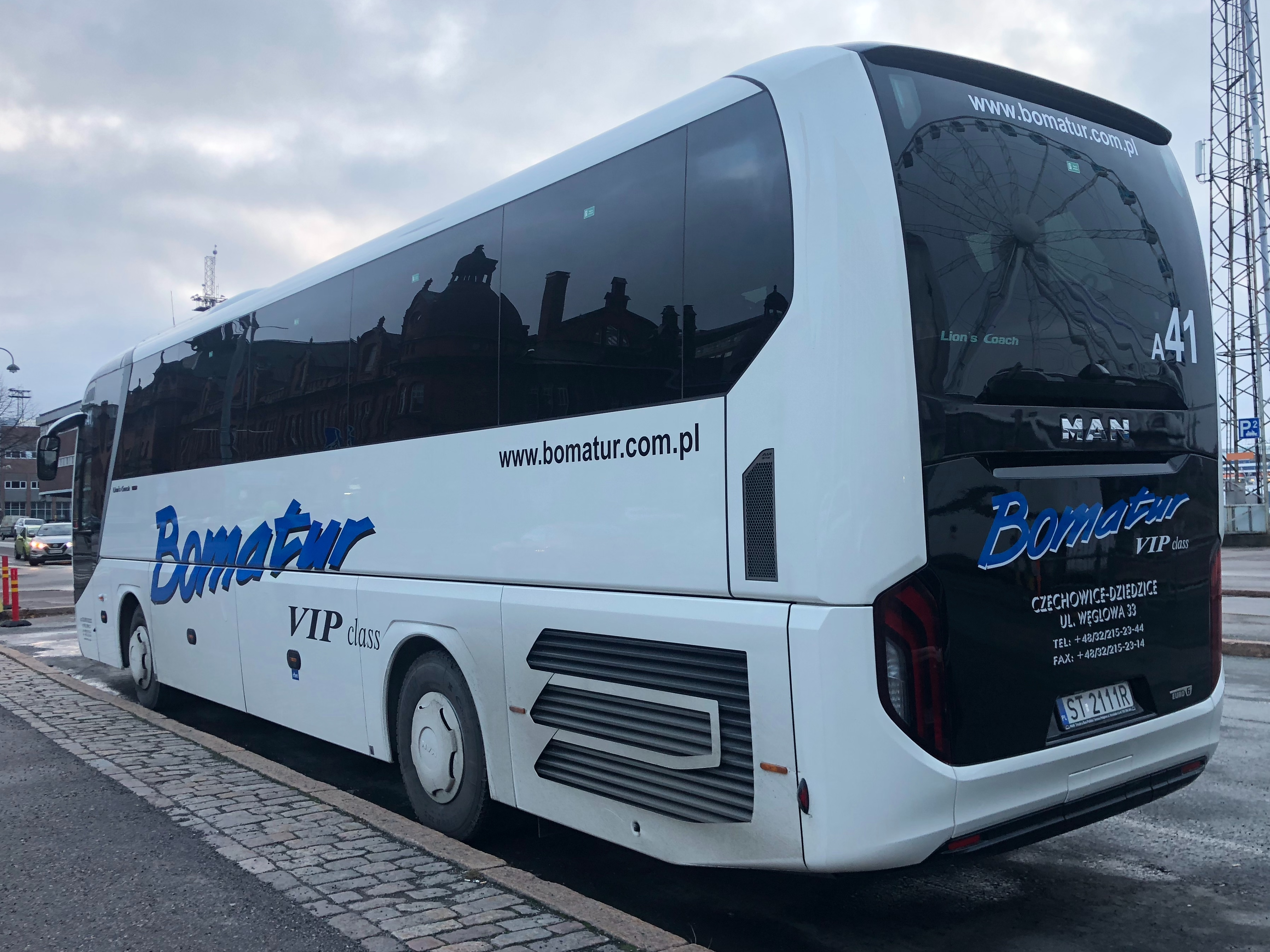
Rear view

Sound Clip of a 2016 MAN Lion's Coach Supreme Euro 6 with D2676LOH in the rear cabin on a 15% incline.

== Background ==
In 1992 MAN introduced the Lion's Star coach. This coach influenced the naming system of subsequent MAN coaches. In 1994 the Lion's Star RH 403 was voted Coach of the Year.

== First generation (1996–2002) ==
In year 1996, besides the famous “Lion's Star” series, a cheaper coach model named “Lion's Coach”, produced in Turkey, was introduced. For the first time, it also includes a 3-axles version called MAN Lion's Top Coach. The optical difference to Lion's Star is the redesigned front, especially the grooves with the form of a triangle under the windshield wipers.

The 12m FRH version is capable for 49 passengers, 1 tourist guide and 1 driver. The D2866 LOH 23 6-cylinder diesel motor with 294 kW (400 hp) and the D2866 LOH 20 6-cylinder diesel motor with 309 kW (420 hp) were available. A manual transmission with 8 forward and 1 backward gear was standard.

== Second generation (2002–2017) ==
The second generation was introduced in 2002 and manufactured until 2017, which was known as R07, R09 - RHC 414, 464, 444. This model also ran alongside a new generation of the more luxurious top-model, the MAN Lion's Star. In 2003 the MAN Lion's Coach was awarded the Red Dot award and a year later was awarded the iF Product Design Award, which is awarded annually by Industrial Forum Design Hanover, in 2004.

The MAN Lion's Coach came with three lengths (12,000mm with 2 axles, 13,260mm and 13,800mm with 3 axles) and two MAN Common Rail engines from the D20 series. The 10.5-litre inline 6 cylinder D2066LOH and the 12.4-litre inline 6 cylinder D2676LOH were rated from 309 kW (420 hp) to 368 kW (500 hp).

MAN continued to develop the Coach over its lifespan. The second-generation model went through upgrades and various facelifts, and its engines continued to be cleaner progressing through the Euro emission Class Euro 3 to Euro 6c. The original model 2003–2008 featured a plain nose end with MAN logo and small radiator grill in the centre and the emissions class progressed from Euro III to Euro IV. The first facelift model (2008–2015) featured a new nose-end design of the subtle and traditional radiator grille ribbing depending on the options of the customer. This could also be seen with an edge trim underneath the windscreen with the MAN logo in the centre. The emission class is progressed from Euro IV to Euro VI. The final facelift (2015–2017) model featured a new nose-end with a black panel with the MAN logo in the centre and the emission class remained at Euro VI.

== Third generation (2017–present) ==
The third-generation Lion's Coach was unveiled at the Busworld 2017 in Kortrijk on 24 October 2017. A complete redesign over its predecessor, the Lion's Coach is now available in four lengths: 12,101 mm and 13,091 mm as a 2-axle vehicle, and 13,361 mm and 13,901 mm as a 3-axle vehicle. The 13m version includes six additional seats more than the 12 m version. The customer can select an optional wheelchair lift for disabled passengers. All four variants of the new MAN Lion's Coach models have space for a maximum of 53, 57, 59 or 63 passengers. The luggage compartments have a volume of between 11.7 and 14.3 m^{3} depending on the model.

The D26 engine and driveline have been up-rated in this model including an extended axle ratio i=2.73 and an increased power output (an increase of 30 hp and 300 Nm compared to its predecessor).

The third-generation MAN Lion's Coach has won several prizes since its introduction, including the "Grand Coach Award" at Busworld 2017, the "Busplaner Innovation Prize 2018" in category "Vehicles and Fleet", the "iF Design Award 2018, and the "Coach of the Year 2020" award at the Busworld 2019 in Brussels.

== Models ==
=== MAN Fortuna ===
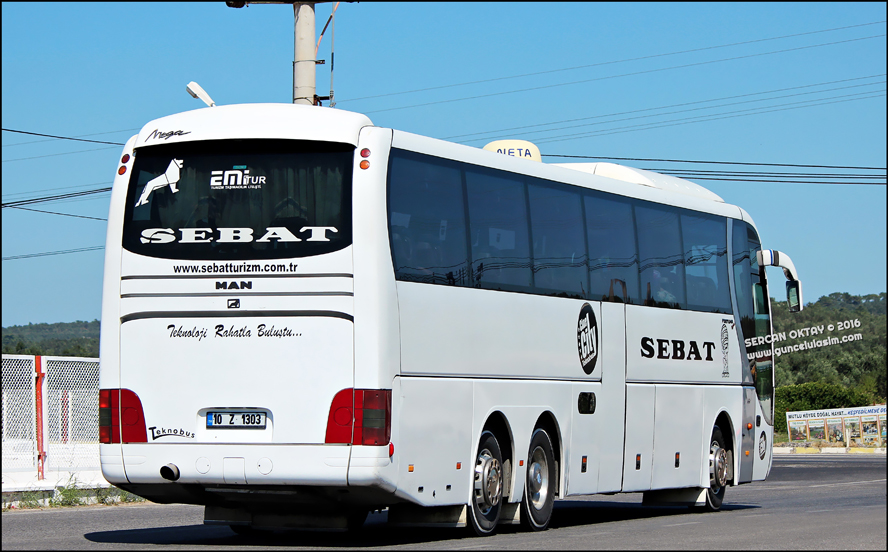
MAN Fortuna Mega

In the Turkish market the MAN Lion's Coach was also known as the MAN Fortuna between 2004 and 2006. There is not much difference between both models possibly seating arrangement and aftermarket additions at the customers. The 12m version is called Fortuna and the longer version Fortuna Mega.

=== MAN Lion's Coach Midi ===
In year 2014, in cooperation with Caetanobus from Portugal, MAN developed a 10m version Lion's Coach, which was presented in Munich, Germany in the same year. This midi-touring coach offers seating for up to 40 passengers, meeting the demands of a luxury coach, and was designed for carrying smaller travel groups. It stands out especially for its compact size and maximum comfort. Similar to Lion's Coach Supreme, its optics are upgraded by silver aluminium stripes.

=== MAN Lion's Comfort - R313/R353 ===
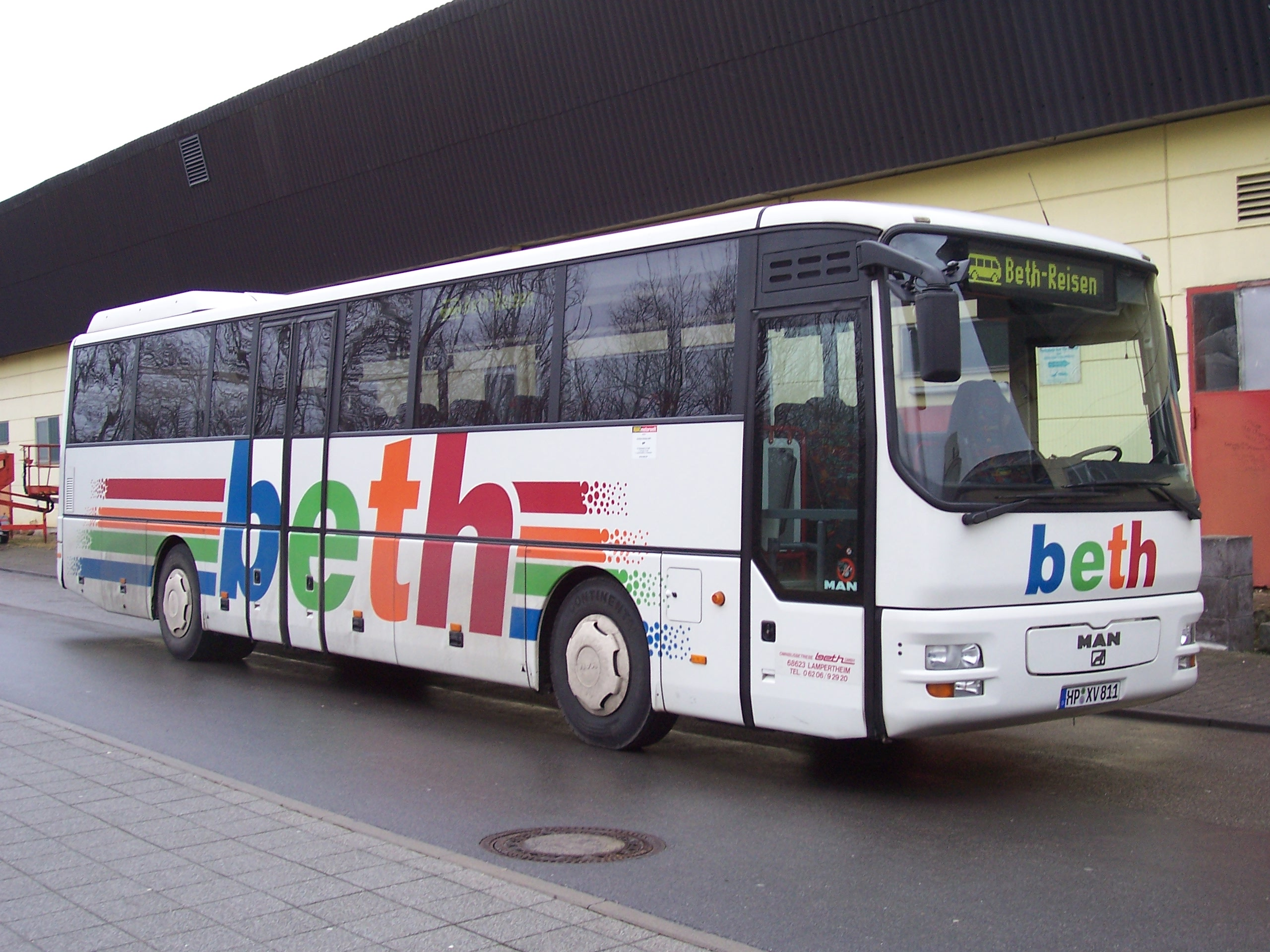
MAN Lion's Comfort R353

Parallel to the former ÜL interurban bus series, there has been an optimised version based on ÜL models with better comfort and equipment for group travels. The engines are powered from 310 to 350 hp. The optical difference to the ÜL model was the 2nd door with high panels instead of low ones, which was both available as single or double leaf door. The Lion's Comfort series was discontinued with the introduction of 2nd generation Lion's Coach.

=== MAN Lion's Star / Lion's Coach Supreme ===
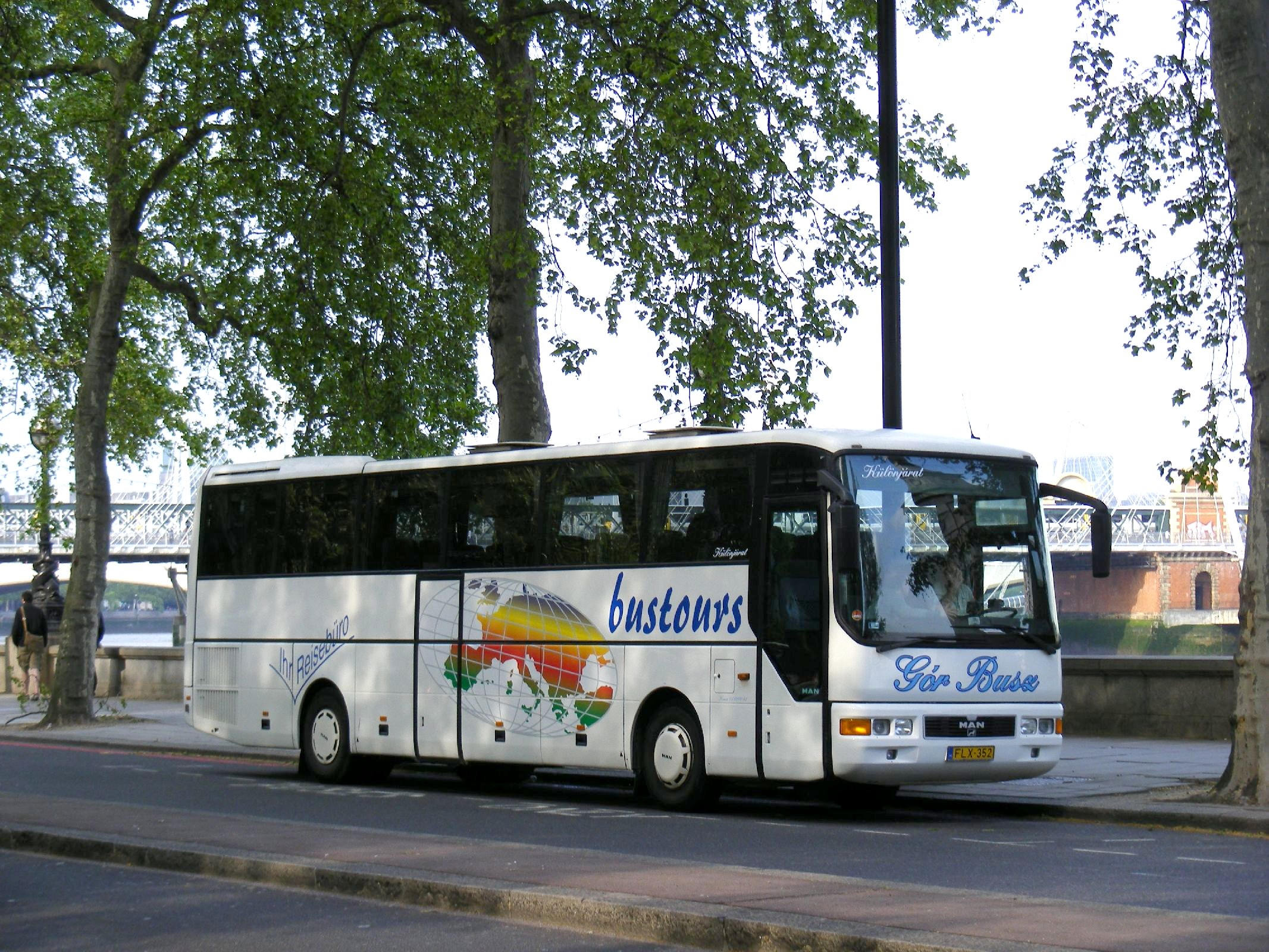
Lion's Star 1st generation

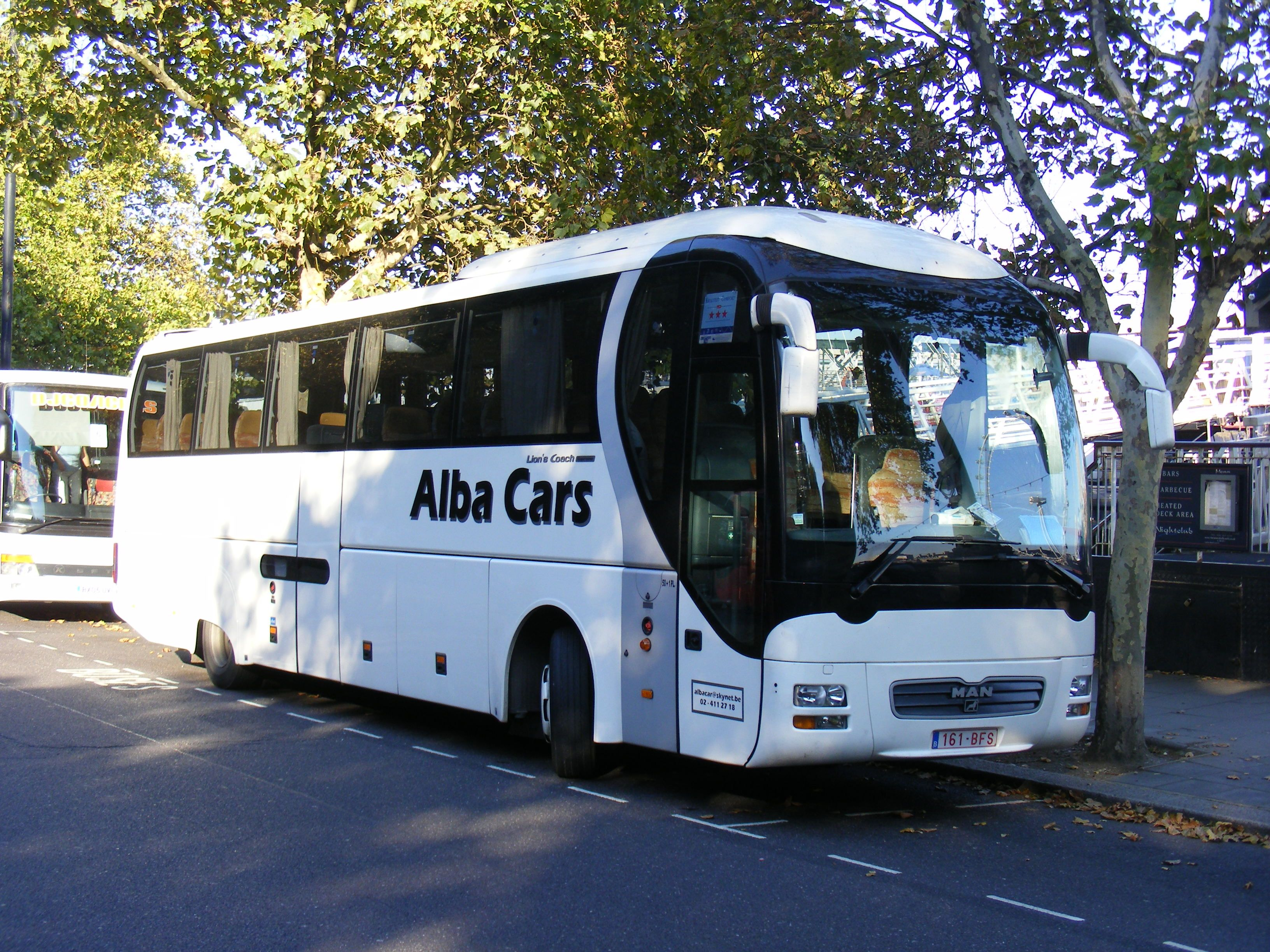
Lion's Coach 2nd generation “Supreme”

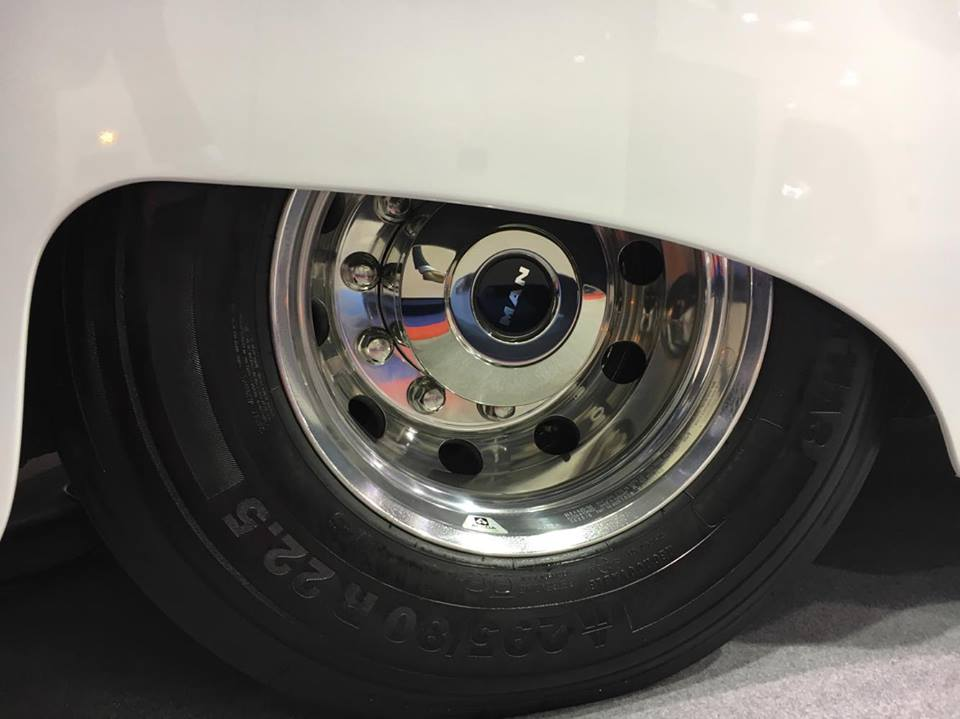
MAN Lion's Coach Supreme - (Rear Wheel Cover)

The Lion's Star is a luxury coach model introduced by MAN in year 1994, which is based on former FRH series. It became the award “Coach of the Year” in the same year.

The second generation of Lion's Star was introduced in 2002. It owns more optical differences in opposition to Lion's Coach: A silver aluminium stripe on the C-pillar, rear wheel cover, and black "radiator grilling" in the front as decoration. Even though the second generation Lion's Star was chosen again for “Coach of the Year” in 2004, its production was concluded in the same year with the introduction of Euro IV emission standards. The optical design elements were succeeded with a special edition named “Supreme”.

=== MAN Lion's Coach Team Edition ===
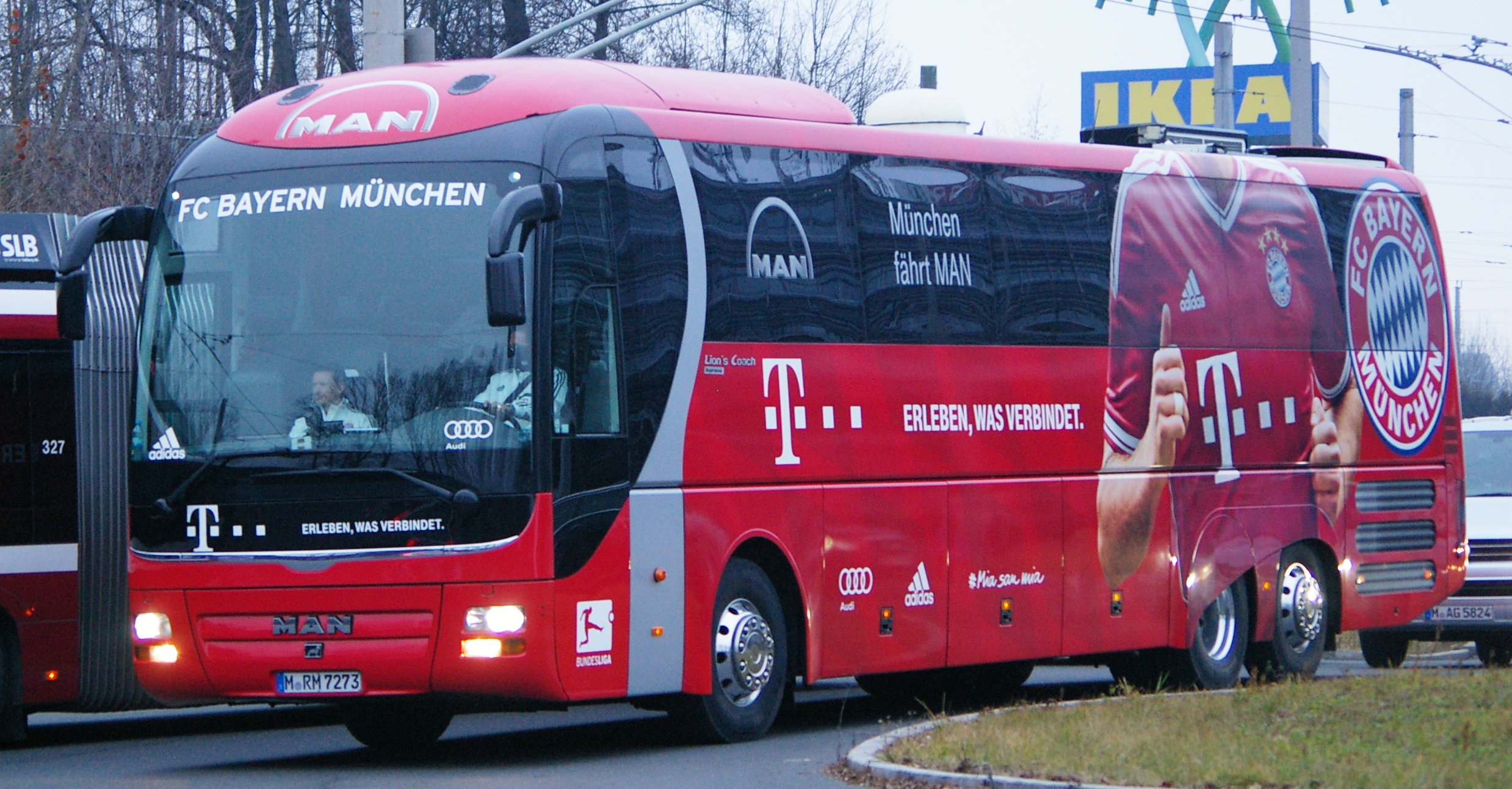
MAN Bundesliga-Teambus, the base for “Team Edition”

Inspired by the Bundesliga team buses from FC Bayern Munich, Borussia Dortmund, VfL Wolfsburg and 1. FC Kaiserslautern, MAN offered a special edition of its successful Lion's Coach in year 2011, which is limited to 50 units.

The exterior design of “Team Edition” is refined by chrome foil stripes in the front and on the C-pillar. A carpet in football field turf look in the entrance expect the passengers. The headrests on driver's and passenger's seats are decorated with letters about typical football words in German e.g. “Chefcoach”, “Spielmacher” and “Torjäger”.

The travel comfort is guaranteed by a Frenzel FOB 554 mobile kitchen with coffee machine and 19-inch monitors with the possibility of showing map navigation.

Three length variants of 12 m (30 units), 13.26 m (10 units) and 13.8 m (10 units) are available to choose. All variants are 2.55 m wide and 3.81 m high. The baggage room volume is rated from 10 to 11.3 cubic metre.

The Lion's Coach Team Edition is powered by a powerful MAN Common-Rail-Diesel engine (D2676 LOH26) rated by 324 kW (440 hp) with a torque of 2100 Nm. The MAN Pure Diesel technology realizes EEV without an addition of AdBlue. An automated 12-speed MAN TipMatic manual transmission with EasyStart and ZF Intarder and a 6-speed automatic transmission with Voith-Retarder are available. Electronic stability program (ESP), Electronic Braking System (EBS), Anti-Lock Braking System (ABS) and Traction Control (ASR) and a rear camera are equipped for a great safety condition. A toilet on board with smoke detector is standard.

The 12 m variant is equipped with polished Alcoa aluminium rims, which is optional at other lengths. Depending on length and equipment option, 44 to 57 seats are possible.

=== MAN Lion's Coach EfficientLine ===
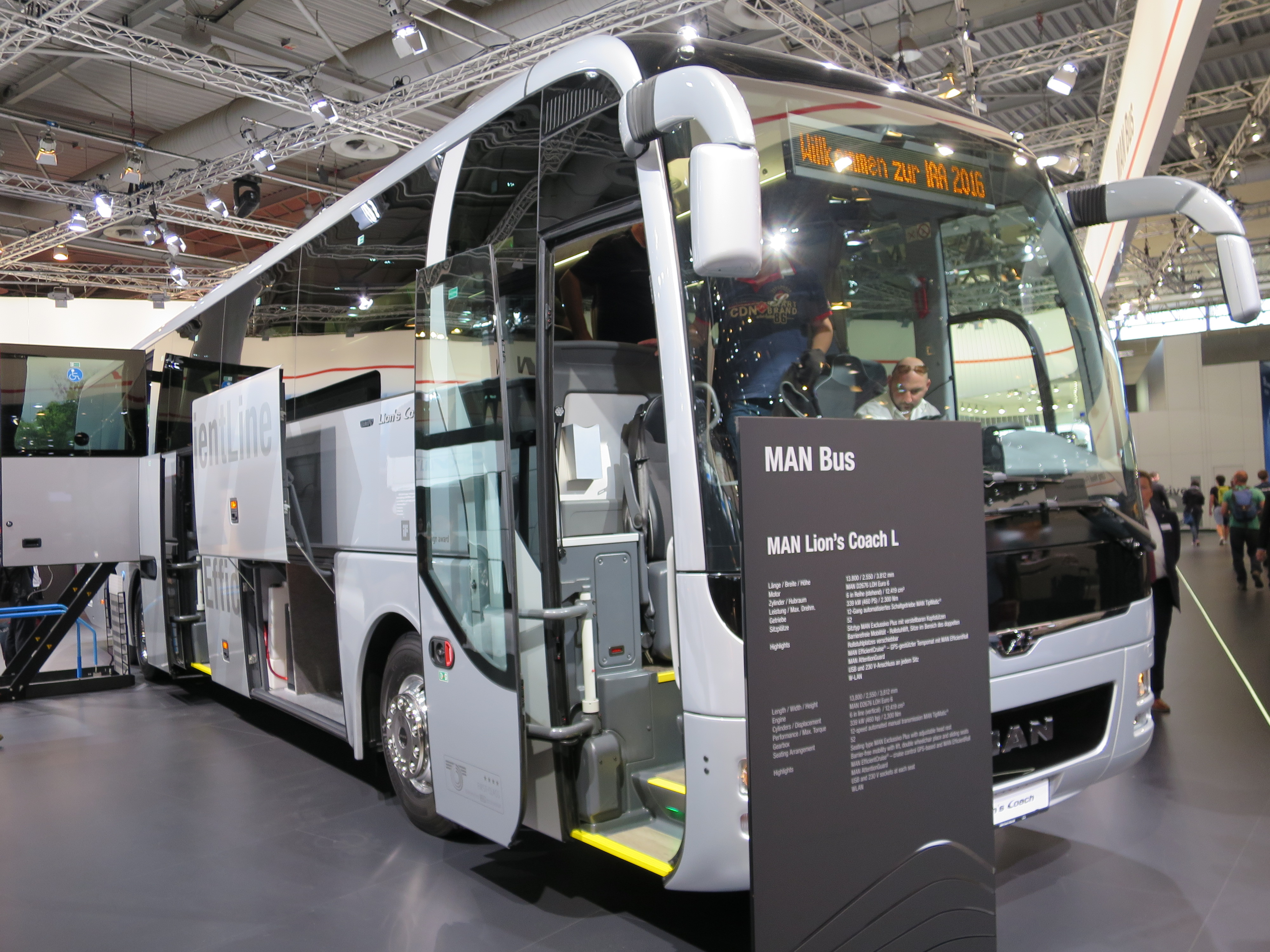
Lion's Coach L Efficientline at IAA 2016

In 2012 Premiered at IAA 2012 was the MAN Lion's Coach efficient line which championed maximised efficiency, weight saving and total cost of ownership: It had various equipment such as Eco-Hypoid rear axle which was maintenance friendly and designed to run at lower speeds, a Tyre Pressure Monitoring system (TPM) and the MAN AdBlue® technology with selective catalytic reduction (SCR) which reduces emissions of nitrogen oxides. All would contribute to reducing consumption by up to 4 litres of diesel over 100 km, compared with a conventionally configured Lion's Coach. On an annual mileage of 100,000 km it could save up to 4,000 litres of fuel which equates to a cost saving of up to EUR 5,000* each year. The result: was an impressive consumption rate in practice** of less than 22 L/100 km, as confirmed in test-driving by TÜV Süd. With these enhancements up to 10,520 kg less in CO_{2} emissions was released into the atmosphere each year with this technology. MAN Nutzfahrzeuge has now featured this technology and options in all models since.

=== MAN Lion's Coach 100 Year Anniversary Edition ===
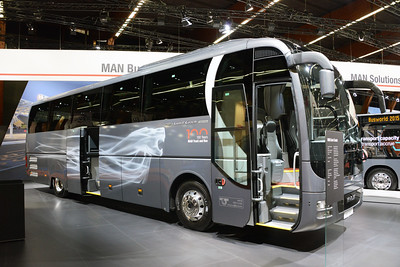
Lion's Coach 100 year anniversary edition at Busworld 2015

At the end of 2015 MAN Nutzfahrzeuge presented to the public at the Busworld 2015 trade fair in Kortrijik The anniversary '100 Years Edition' of the MAN Lion's Coach. The special edition is rare and was available to customers in a limited production run of 100 units until 31 December 2015, which could be configured with its own basic equipment and selected optional extras by the customer. The '100 Years Edition', was marketed throughout Europe apart from the UK, showcasing the very best of the MAN Lion's Coach and was aimed at customers who love the product.

The model featured specially designed upholstery featuring the MAN lion and Texas grey metallic paint to further enhance the appearance of the model. Fitted with Alcoa Dura-bright aluminium wheels and Fender Skirts over the rear wheels that gave it a chic look and to improve aerodynamics, fuel efficiency and splash protection. This edition also includes all the latest generation safety and assistance systems such as Adaptive Cruise Control (ACC), lane guard system (LGS), advanced emergency braking system (EBA), brake assistant (BA), MAN EfficientCruise and Maximum Speed Control (MSC).

=== MAN Lion’s Coach Büssing Edition ===
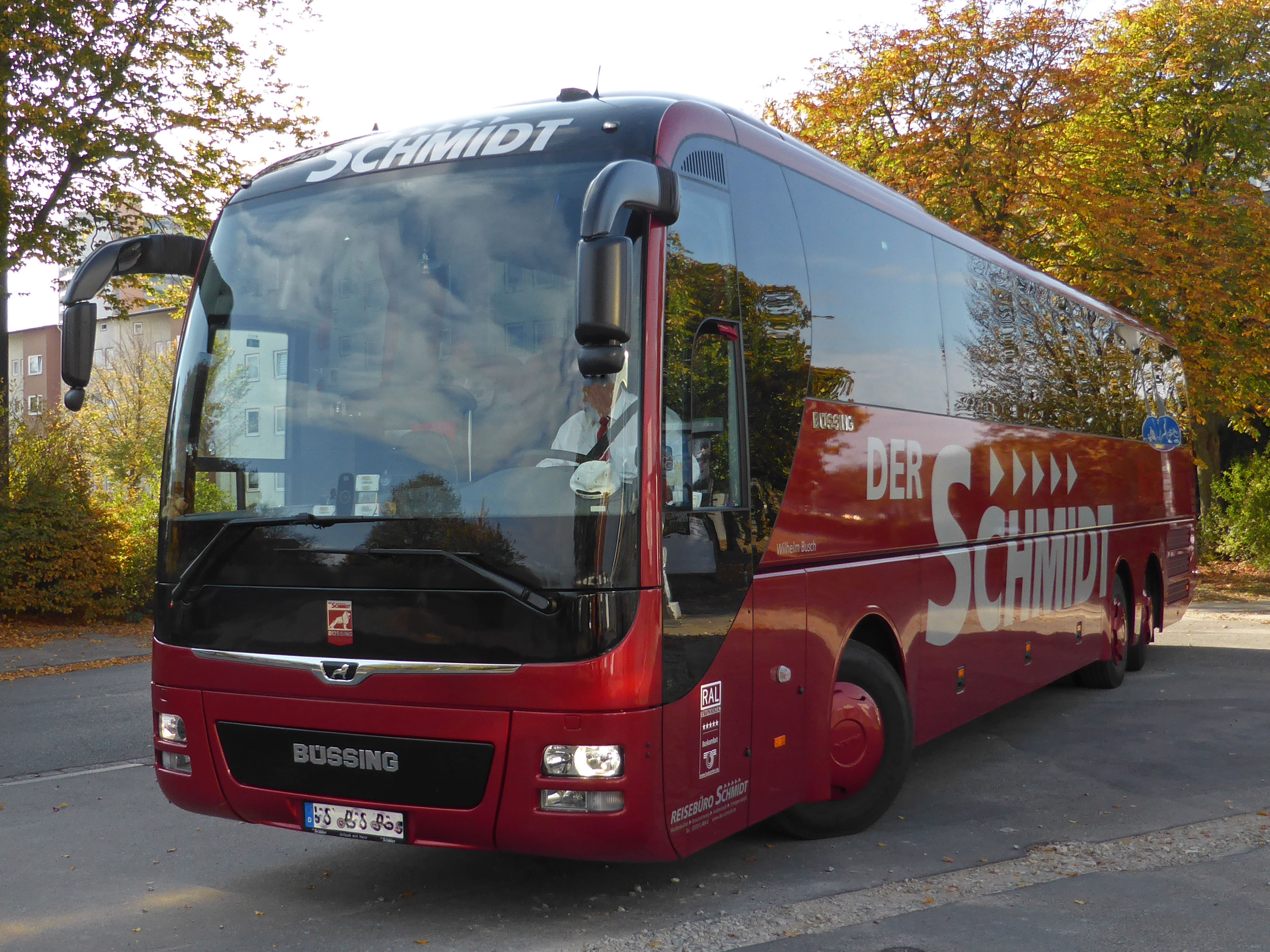
Lion's Coach L Büssing Edition

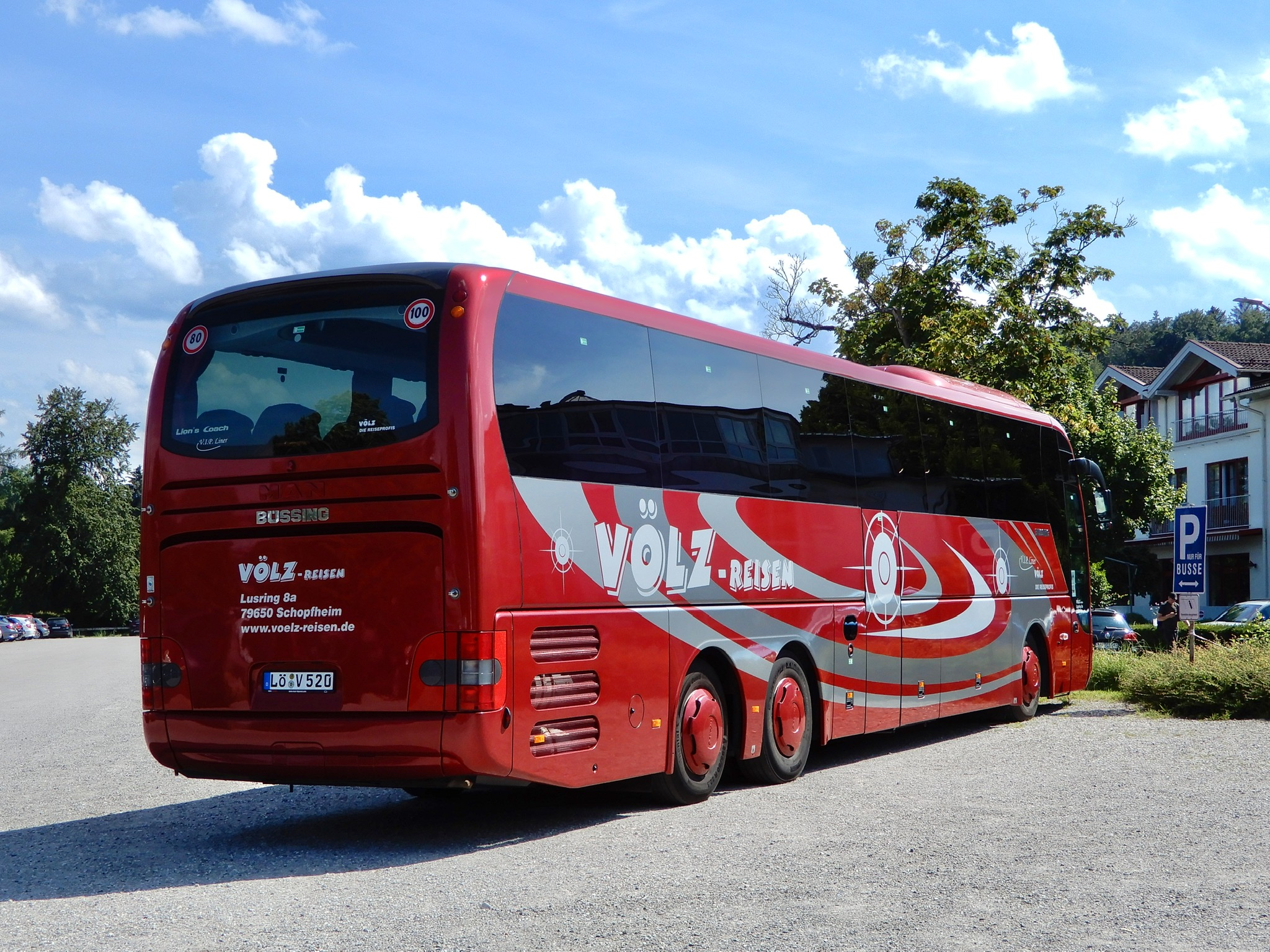
Rear view

At the beginning of May 2017, the bus company “Der Schmidt“ was the first customer who put the first four units of Lion's Coach “Büssing Edition“ in operation. With a limited production run of only 12 units, this edition is extremely rare. It is about a MAN Lion's Coach L modified by MAN Modification Center in Plauen after the requests of customers.

The naming of the bus comes from Heinrich Büssing, a German inventor, entrepreneur and also a successful constructor of trucks and buses, who was known for looking for especially innovative solutions to technological challenges. Philipp Cantauw, the managing director of Der Schmidt, once explained: “It was our wish to create a bus that combines the most advanced technologies and innovations with economy. And MAN with its bus modification center was able to build a bus meeting our expectations.” That is why Der Schmidt from Wolfenbüttel has chosen this name for this bus project.

With 3 axles and 13.80m total length, the bus provides comfortable seats for up to 44 passengers and meets the 5-stars standard of Gütegemeinschaft Buskomfort (GKB). Its interior equipment includes sockets with USB-ports under every double seats, starry sky and ambient lighting in changing colors, a modern kitchen block in front of door 2, an extra wide comfort toilet as well as several storage closets. In addition, a projection under the bus entrance with company slogan is available. The bus is powered by a powerful MAN Euro-VI engine with 460 PS (338 kW) with MAN TipMatic gearbox. Several assistive systems including Lane Guard System (LGS), Adaptive Cruise Control (ACC) and topographically based cruise control “MAN EfficientCruise” with sail function “EfficientRoll” ensure a safe and efficient journey.

== Specifications ==
MAN Lion's Coach standard equipment includes several facilities: air conditioner, LCD monitors, DVD player, WC, refrigerator, hot drinks facility, GPS navigation, microphone, reclining seats, seat belts, Anti-lock braking system (ABS), Electronic stability program (ESP), Electronic Braking System (EBS), Traction control, and Euro V/Euro VI engine.

== Gallery ==
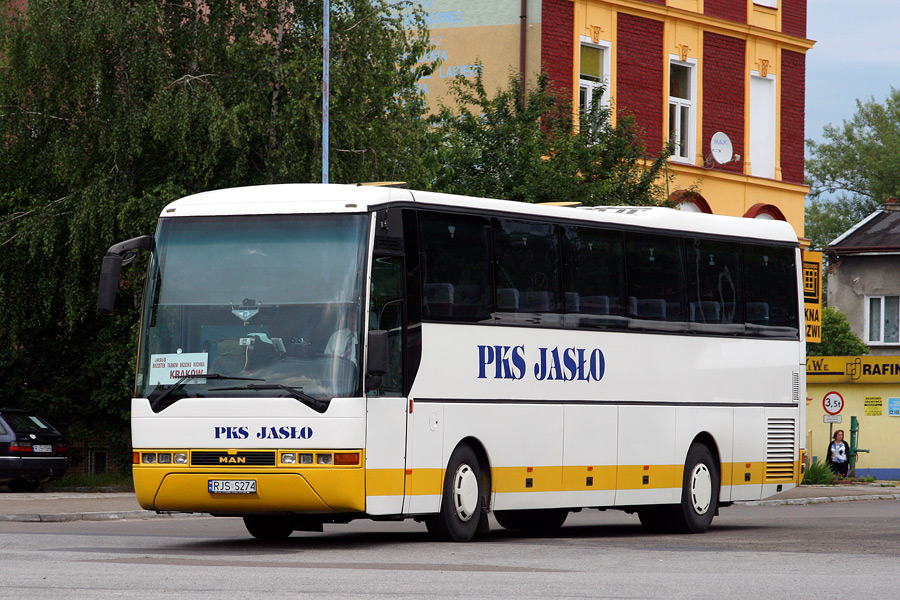
Lion's Coach 1st generation

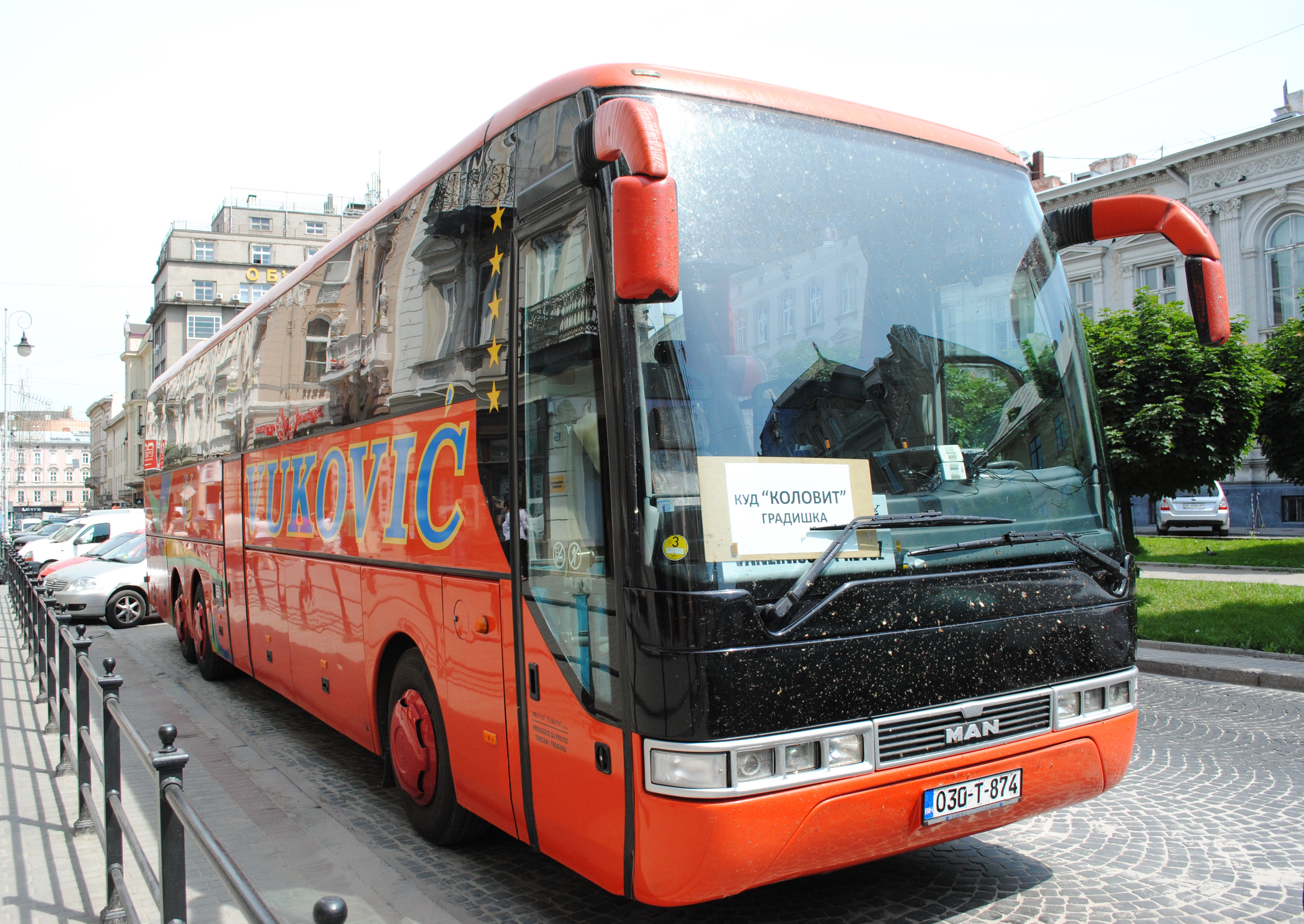
Lion's Top Coach 1st generation

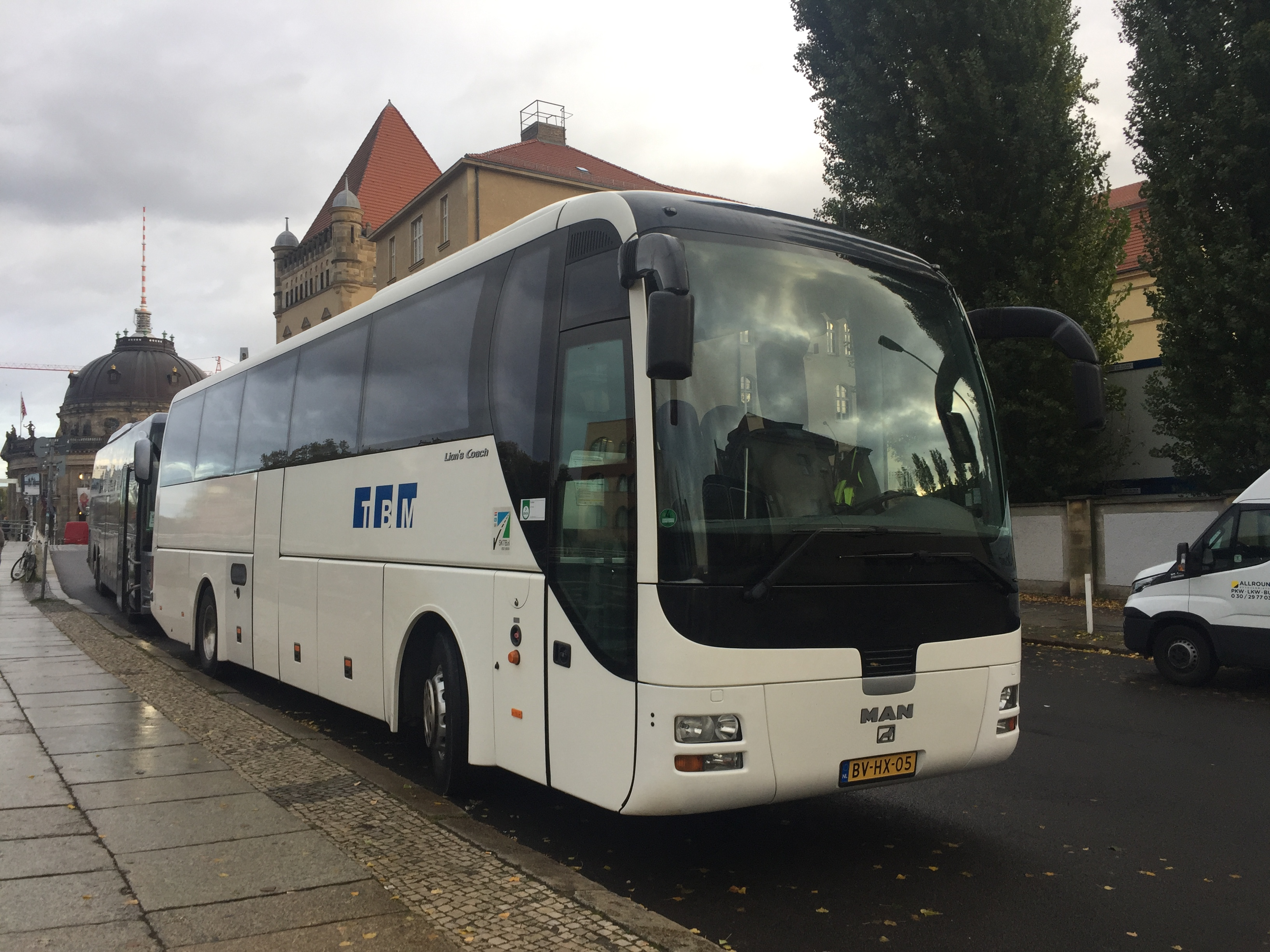
Lion's Coach 2nd generation

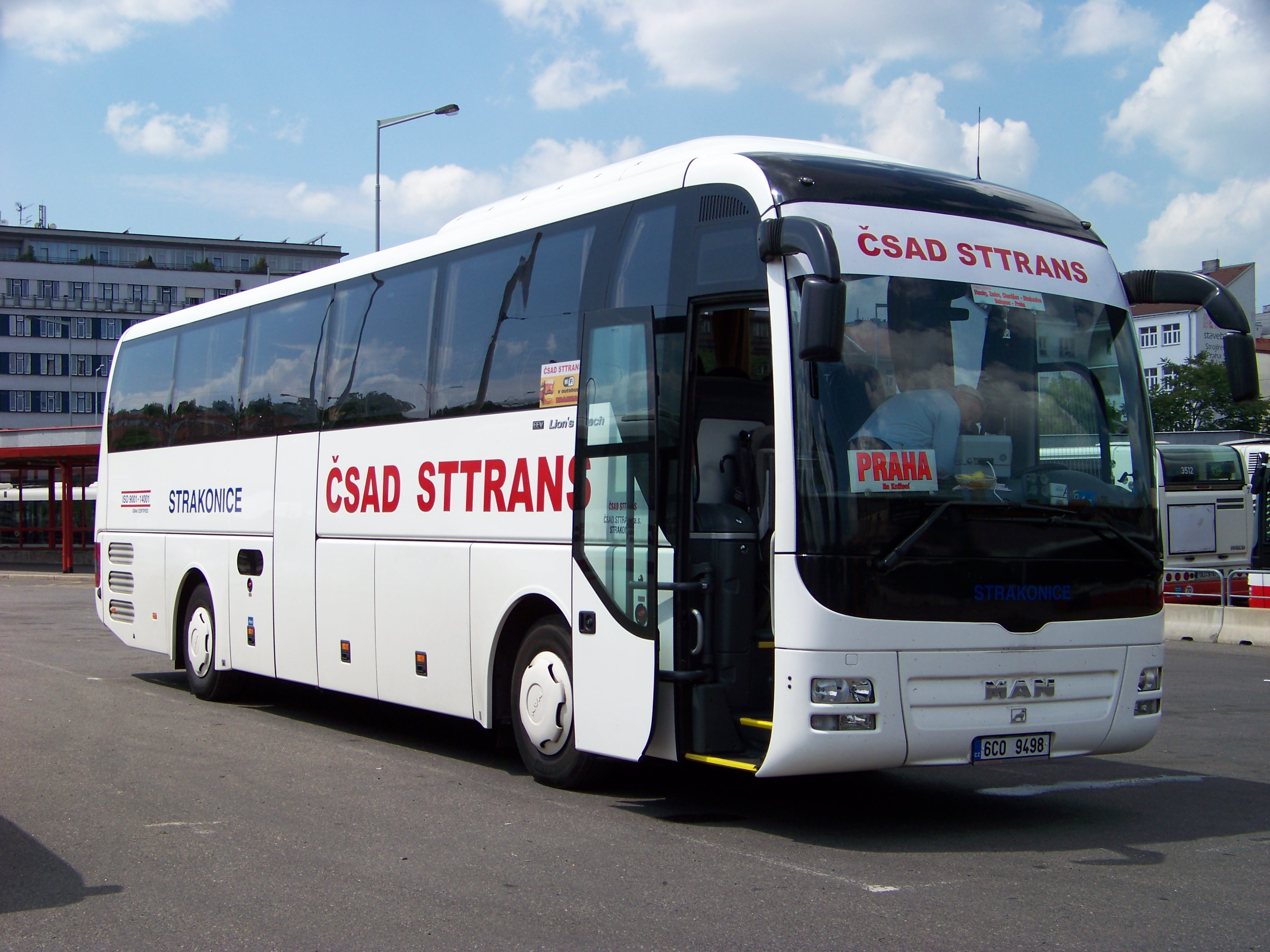
Lion's Coach 2nd generation (1st facelift)

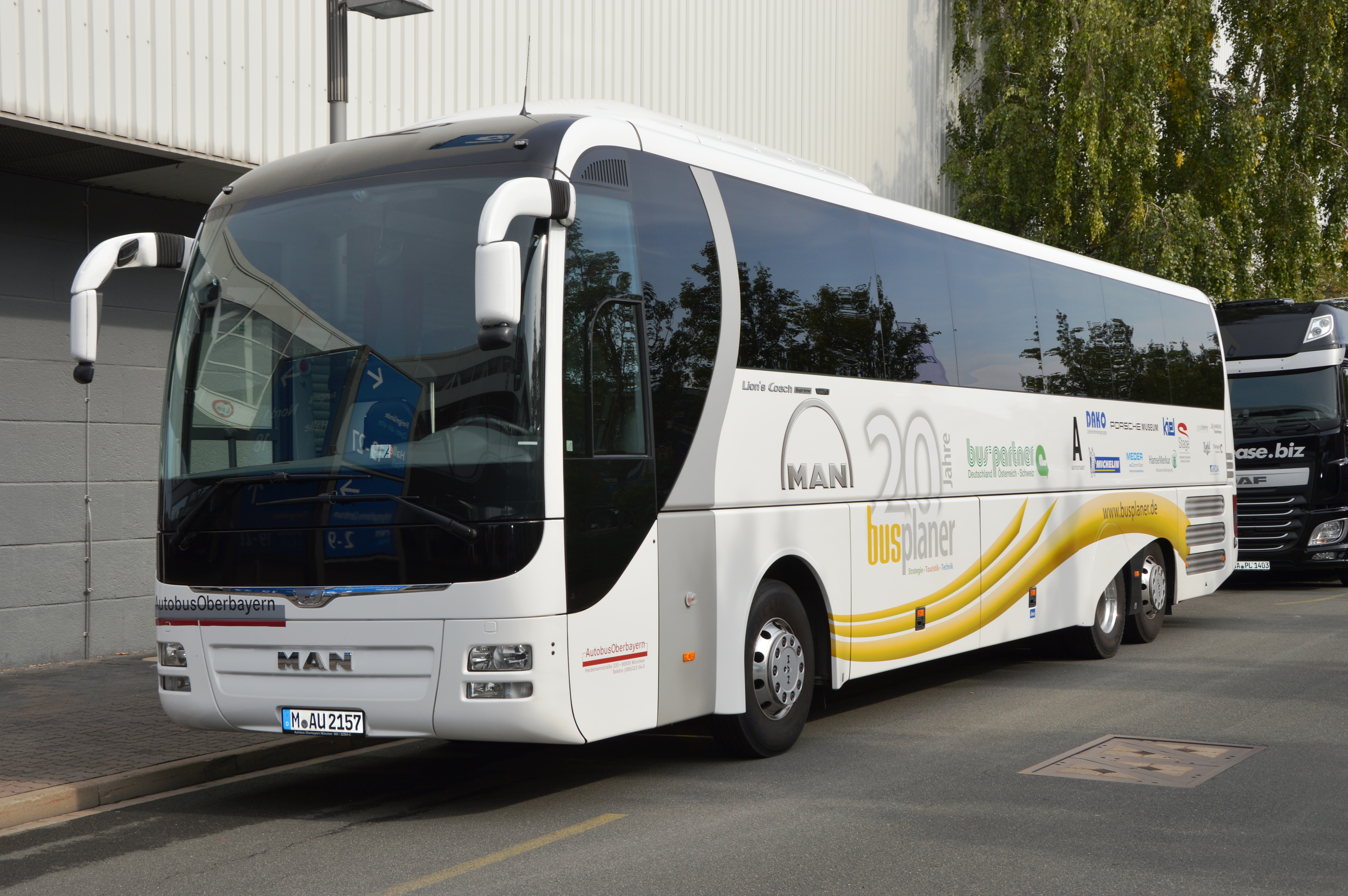
Lion's Coach C “Supreme” 2nd generation (1st facelift)

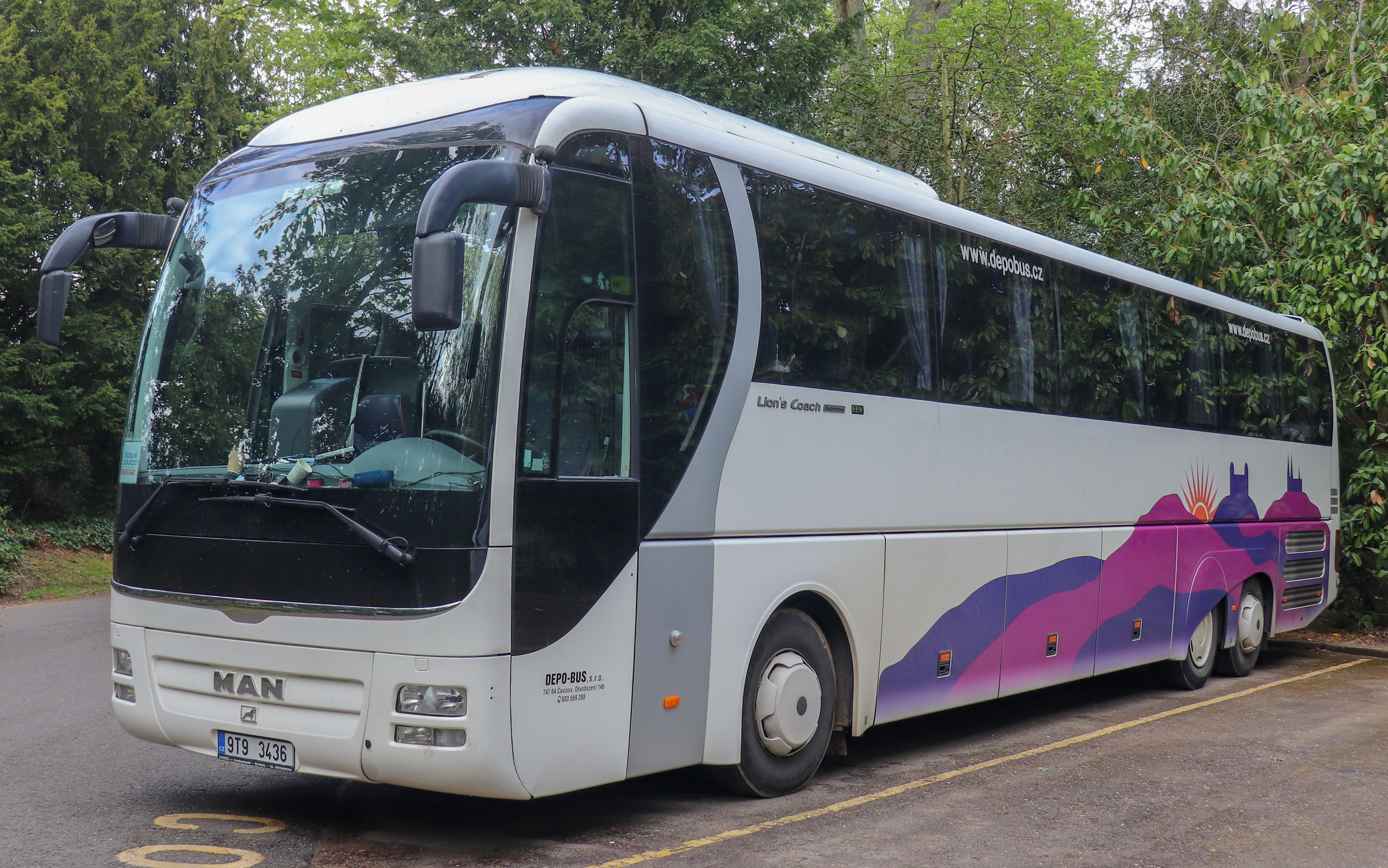
Lion's Coach L “Supreme” 2nd generation (1st facelift)

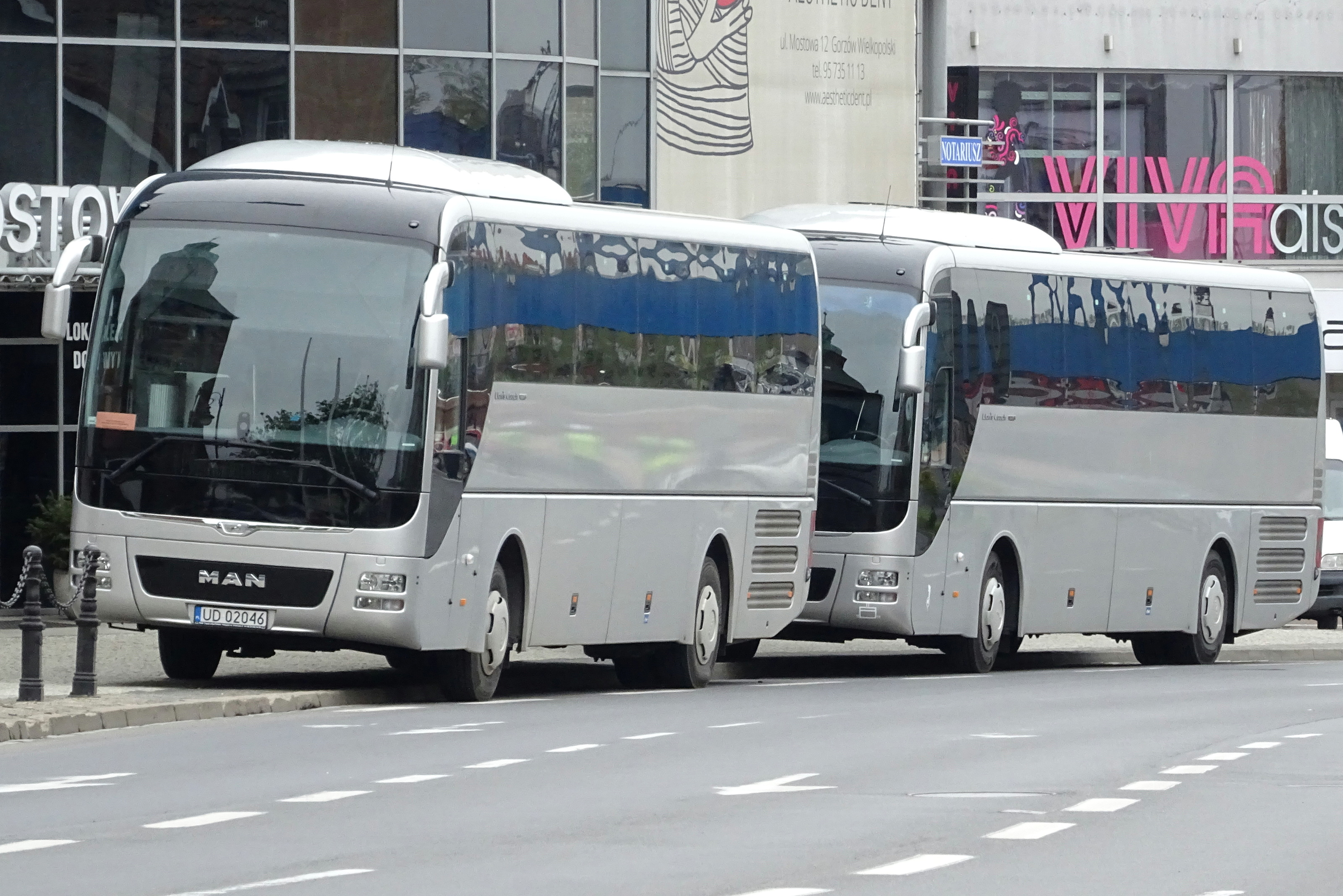
Lion's Coach 2nd generation (2nd facelift)

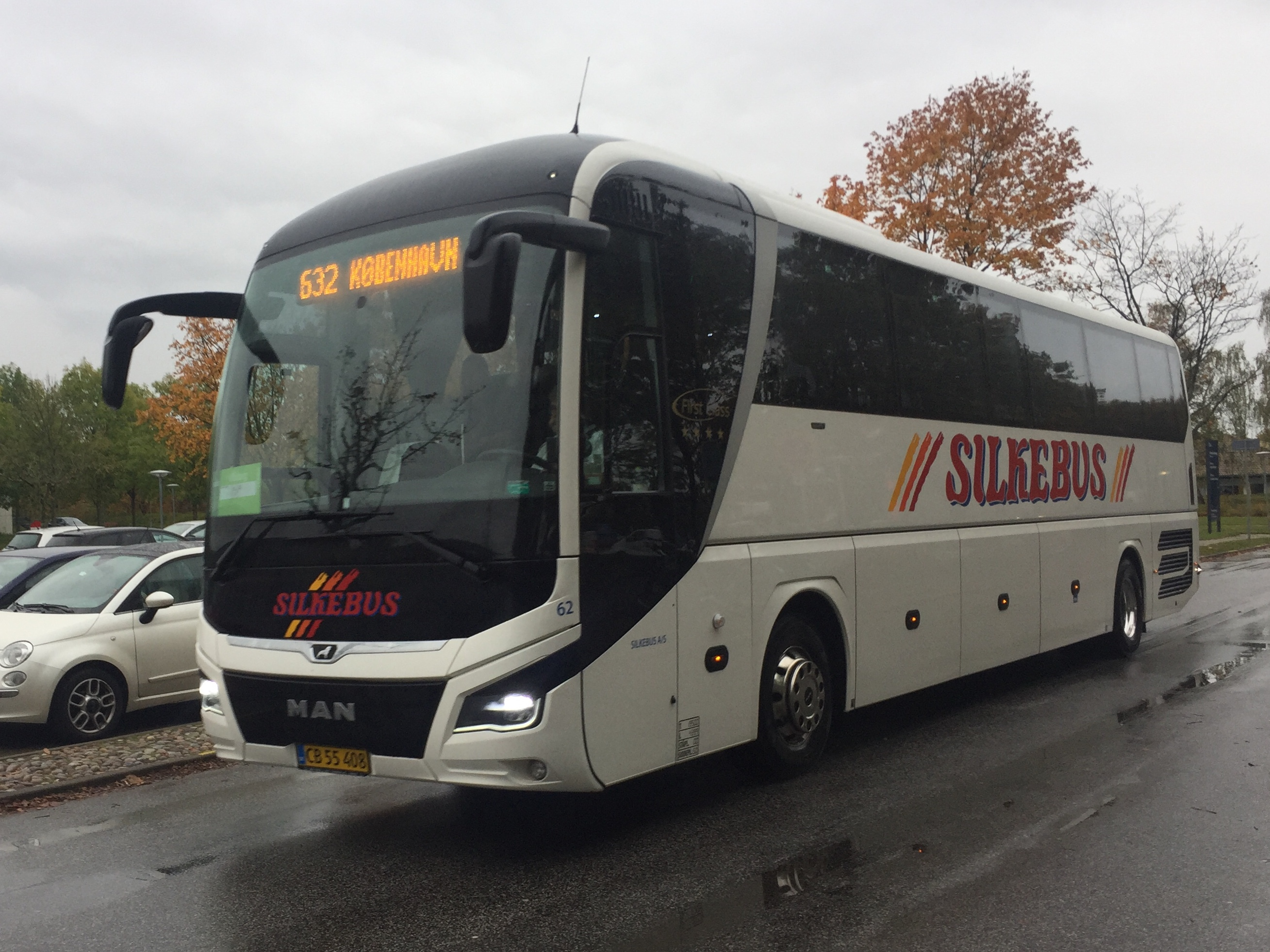
Lion's Coach C 3rd generation (2 axles)

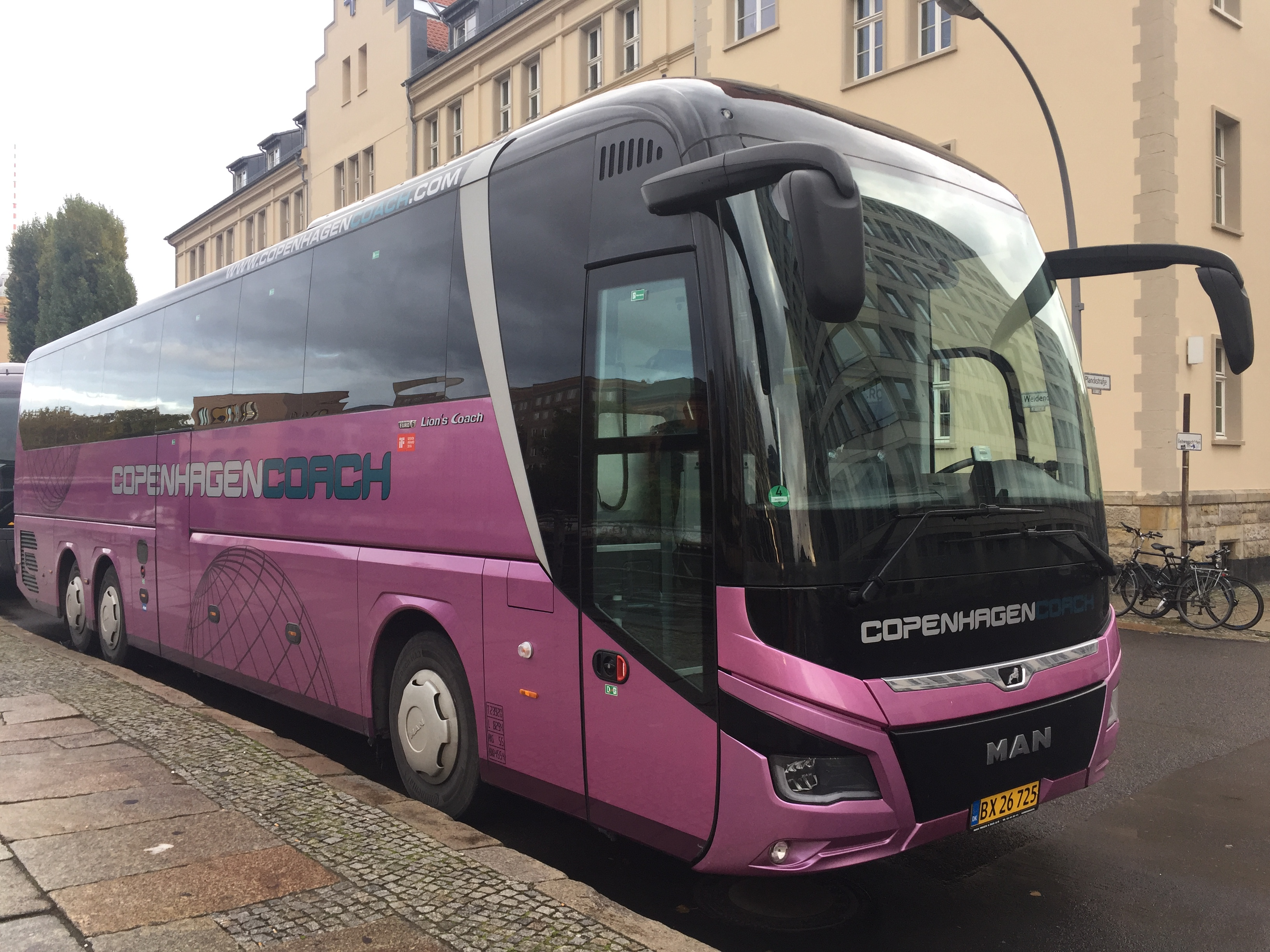
Lion's Coach C 3rd generation (3 axles)
