= Bus Simulator 27 =

2026 bus simulator video game

- Cover art featuring a Solaris Urbino 12 and a Mercedes-Benz Tourismo
- Developer: Simteract
- Publisher: Astragon Entertainment
- Series: Bus Simulator
- Engine: Unreal Engine 5
- Platforms: PlayStation 5; Windows; Xbox Series X/S
- Release: 8 September 2026 (Note: Users who purchased the year 1 edition are due to receive access on 3 September 2026, five days earlier than the public release.)
- Genre: Vehicle simulation
- Modes: Single-player, multiplayer

Bus Simulator 27 is a bus simulator game developed by Simteract and published by Astragon Entertainment. It is the seventh installment in the Bus Simulator series, and is the direct sequel to Bus Simulator 21. Developed with Unreal Engine 5, the game was released for PlayStation 5, Windows and Xbox Series X/S on 8 September 2026.

== Gameplay ==
Bus Simulator 27 is set in a fictional world named "Felicia Bay", which is inspired by the Iberian Peninsula. Like the previous titles, the game will offer a cooperative multiplayer mode that supports up to four players. More than 45 licensed buses from 13 manufacturers will be featured at the initial launch. Coach buses would be introduced in the series, featuring Mercedes-Benz Tourismo, Scania Irizar i8 and MAN Lion's Coach. FlixBus will also be added to the game in a future expansion, scheduled in July 2027. Other licensed buses include Hess lighTram 12 Plug and Alexander Dennis Enviro100EV. The game will support a four-player multiplayer mode, including crossplay.

== Development and release ==
Astragon Entertainment announced Bus Simulator 27 in July 2025 with the reveal of its first game trailer. The game is developed with Unreal Engine 5 by Simteract, who previously worked with Nacon on several vehicle simulation titles, such as Taxi Life and Train Life. The Polish video game developer replaced Stillalive Studios, who chose to partner with Saber Interactive for Bus Bound. The game is set to be launched on PlayStation 5, Windows and Xbox Series X/S platforms. A demo was released for players on Steam on 15 June 2026. Users who purchased the year 1 edition received access on 3 September 2026, five days earlier than the official release, 8 September 2026.

== Reception ==
Reception

Aggregate score
Aggregator	Score
Metacritic	61/100

Bus Simulator 27 received "mixed or average" reviews according to review aggregator Metacritic.
