= Bus Simulator 16 =

2016 vehicle simulation video game

- Cover art featuring an articulated MAN Lion's City bus
- Developer: Stillalive Studios
- Publisher: Astragon Entertainment
- Series: Bus Simulator
- Engine: Unity
- Platforms: Microsoft Windows; macOS
- Release: WW: 3 March 2016
- Genre: Vehicle simulation
- Modes: Single-player, multiplayer

Bus Simulator 16 is a bus simulator game developed by stillalive studios and published by Astragon Entertainment for Microsoft Windows and macOS. It is powered by Unity and was available on 3 March 2016 worldwide. It is the fourth game in the Bus Simulator series. A sequel titled Bus Simulator 18 was released in 2018.

== Gameplay ==
An in-game screenshot from the cockpit camera of a MAN Lion's City

Bus Simulator 16 has licensed the vehicles of MAN. In addition to the buses of the German bus maker, the game features a total of six buses that allow players to drive across five districts. The game also provides a route manager for players to create their own bus lines. A multiplayer mode is available in the game as well.

== Development ==
Bus Simulator 16 was announced July 2015. It is the first game in the series developed by Austrian video game developer stillalive Studios. The game was scheduled to release on 20 January 2016 for Microsoft Windows and macOS, but it was postponed to 3 March 2016 due to technical issues. A bus downloadable content featuring three licensed Mercedes-Benz buses, including an 18-meter long Citaro G articulated bus, were available on 25 January 2017.

== Reception ==
Reception

Aggregate score
Aggregator	Score
Metacritic	46/100

Review score
Publication	Score
GameStar	45/100

Bus Simulator 16 received "mixed or average" reviews, according to review aggregator platform Metacritic.

Richard Allen of Invision Community rated a seven to the game. He wrote that the handlings of the game were quite similar with the American Truck Simulator of SCS Software, which was published in the same period.
