= Bus Simulator 18 =

2018 vehicle simulation video game

- Cover art featuring an articulated Mercedes-Benz Citaro bus
- Developer: Stillalive Studios
- Publisher: Astragon Entertainment
- Series: Bus Simulator
- Engine: Unreal Engine 4
- Platforms: Windows; PlayStation 4; Xbox One
- Release: Windows; 13 June 2018; PlayStation 4, Xbox One; 17 September 2019
- Genre: Vehicle simulation
- Modes: Single-player, multiplayer

Bus Simulator 18 (also known as Bus Simulator on consoles) is a bus simulator game developed by Stillalive Studios and published by Astragon Entertainment. It is powered by Unreal Engine 4 and was released in June 2018 for Windows and in September 2019 for PlayStation 4 and Xbox One. It is the fifth game in the Bus Simulator franchise and is the direct sequel to Bus Simulator 16. A sequel titled Bus Simulator 21 was released in 2021.

== Gameplay ==
An in-game screenshot from the cockpit camera of a MAN Lion's City on a rainy day

Bus Simulator 18 features a sizable map of fictional modern city Seaside Valley, consisting of twelve districts, which is 2.5 times bigger than Bus Simulator 16. The game allows players to drive eight licensed vehicles from four different bus manufacturers including Iveco, MAN, Mercedes-Benz, and Setra ranging from low-floor buses to articulated buses. Like its predecessor, the game also uses a procedural generation system that requires players to complete different missions to unlock new districts. Management-wise, players are able to create their own bus lines, as well as buying, selling and upgrading buses.

== Development ==
An in-game trailer was released in May 2018. In comparison to the Unity-based Bus Simulator 16, Bus Simulator 18 is powered by Unreal Engine 4, which shows considerably improved graphics. It was released to Microsoft Windows in June 2018, with modding and multiplayer mode were featured for the first time in the Bus Simulator series. PlayStation 4 and Xbox One versions were later made available on September 17, 2019. A map expansion downloadable content was released in May 2019.

== Reception ==
Reception

Aggregate score
Aggregator	Score
Metacritic	PC: 67/100; PS4: 61/100; XONE: 60/100

Review scores
Publication	Score
GameStar	67/100
Shacknews	6/10

Bus Simulator 18 received "mixed or average" reviews, according to review aggregator platform Metacritic.

Chris Jarrard of Shacknews gave a 6 to the game, writing "Bus Simulator 18 is not a game changer and to be honest, it's not the most rewarding experience I've ever had in front of my PC." He had three major issues of the game — a lack of content, multiplayer bugs, and a boring campaign.

Chris O'Connor of Impulse Gamer rated it 4 out of 5. He considered the game to be quite relaxing, but he considered its content not deep enough.

Alec Meer of Rock, Paper, Shotgun enjoyed the atmosphere in the game, which is so great that he even would like to become a bus driver. He says "Bus Simulator 18 leaves me with a deep sympathy for bus drivers and a great terror that I might ever become one."

Andy Kelly of PC Gamer compared the game with the similar-genre video game Euro Truck Simulator 2 of SCS Software, commenting the game maybe not as good as the truck-simulator, but it is full of interaction, which is what the Truck Simulator franchise is missing.
