= Bus Bound =

2026 video game

- Cover art of the game featuring a New Flyer Xcelsior
- Developer: Stillalive Studios
- Publisher: Saber Interactive
- Engine: Unreal Engine 5
- Platforms: PlayStation 5; Windows; Xbox Series X/S
- Release: 30 April 2026
- Genre: Vehicle simulation
- Modes: Single-player, multiplayer

Bus Bound is a bus simulator game developed by Stillalive Studios and published by Saber Interactive. The game was released for PlayStation 5, Windows and Xbox Series X/S on 30 April 2026.

== Gameplay ==
Bus Bound is set in the fictional American city of Emberville. Players are able to drive up to 17 licensed buses, including the Xcelsior 40ft CNG and the Blue Bird Sigma. As with Bus Simulator 21, a multiplayer would be featured and support up to four players.

== Development and release ==
The game was revealed in June at the PC Gaming Show 2025. It is developed by Stillalive Studios, who worked on the last three titles of the Bus Simulator series, and published by Saber Interactive. Powered by Unreal Engine 5, the game was launched on PlayStation 5, Windows and Xbox Series X/S on 30 April 2026.

== Reception ==
Reception

Aggregate scores
Aggregator	Score
Metacritic	PC: 77/100; PS5: 76/100
OpenCritic	67% recommend

Review score
Publication	Score
GameStar	80/100

Bus Bound received received "generally favorable" reviews according to review aggregator Metacritic. Fellow review aggregator OpenCritic assessed that the game received mixed reviews, being recommended by 67% of critics.
