= Bus Simulator City Ride =

2022 video game

- PAL cover art of the Nintendo Switch version featuring Alexander Dennis Enviro500
- Developer: Stillalive Studios
- Publisher: Astragon
- Series: Bus Simulator
- Platforms: Android; iOS; Nintendo Switch
- Release: 13 October 2022
- Genre: Vehicle simulation
- Modes: Single-player, multiplayer

Bus Simulator City Ride is a bus simulator game developed by Stillalive Studios and published by Astragon Entertainment. It is a spin-off to the Bus Simulator series. The game has been released on 13 October 2022 for Android, iOS and Nintendo Switch.

== Gameplay ==
Bus Simulator City Ride is set in "Havensburg", a new fictional city inspired by northern European cities. The game offers a total of ten licensed buses from the manufacturers such as Alexander Dennis, Blue Bird, Setra, Vicinity Motor, etc. The experience of the game is quite immersive with the realistic 3D graphics of driving the bus and exploring the fictional modern cities.

== Development and release ==
The game was announced on 2 June 2022, with both Stillalive Studios and Astragon returning to work on the game. The game's release date was then set to 13 October 2022 for Android, iOS and Nintendo Switch.
