= Euro Truck Simulator 2 =

2012 video game about driving trucks across Europe

- Developer: SCS Software
- Publisher: SCS Software
- Director: Pavel Šebor
- Producers: Pavel Šebor; Dominik Frýba
- Series: Truck Simulator
- Engine: Prism3D
- Platforms: Windows; Linux; macOS; PlayStation 5; Xbox Series X/S
- Release: Windows; 18 October 2012 (Steam) TBA (Microsoft Store); Linux; 16 April 2013 (beta); macOS; 29 January 2015; PlayStation 5; TBA; Xbox Series X/S; TBA
- Genre: Vehicle simulation
- Modes: Single-player, multiplayer

Euro Truck Simulator 2 is a 2012 truck simulator game developed and published by SCS Software for Microsoft Windows, Linux, and macOS. It is the fourth installment in the Truck Simulator series, a sequel to Euro Truck Simulator, and since 2016 has served as a parallel or companion game to American Truck Simulator. The game was released on Steam on 18 October 2012.

Euro Truck Simulator 2 is set in a condensed depiction of Europe, featuring European cab-over semi-trucks and various real-world cities, roads, landmarks, and other locations. Players transport and deliver a variety of cargo while managing their business and maintaining their fleet of licensed trucks and coaches.

Euro Truck Simulator 2 was released in 2012 to positive reviews and continues to receive considerable updates and downloadable content releases. As of 2026, the game has sold over 22 million copies. A port of the game to the Xbox Series X/S and the PlayStation 5 is planned for 2026. (Note: In the Oklahoma Release Stream, the CEO Pavel Šebor stated that SCS is looking to release ETS2 and ATS to consoles in the future and are working on a new generation of Prism3D to prepare for this, while providing performance/graphical benefits to PC players.)

== Gameplay ==
Euro Truck Simulator 2 is a truck driving simulator with elements of a business simulation game. Players drive trucks and coaches in an open world scale rendition of Europe, delivering cargo to a designated location to receive monetary payments and experience points. To get the most money and experience points from their delivery jobs, players must obey traffic laws, avoid damaging their vehicle or cargo, manage their vehicle's fuel and the cost of refueling, optionally handle driving fatigue and the time loss when stopping to rest, and deliver the cargo on time. Payment and experience points are also determined by the distance traveled and the type of goods being transported.

When starting out, players select a home city to start their logistics business, acquiring the truck garage in that city. At first, players can only take "quick jobs" as a freelancer using other companies' trucks, with the goal of saving up or taking a loan to purchase their own truck. Once a player acquires their own truck, they can complete jobs using their truck, though they must drive themselves to the location of the trailer to activate the job. Players can also purchase their own trailers, though that still requires driving to the origin location of a job with the correct trailer to load the cargo. As the player's business grows, they can upgrade their garages, purchase new garages in other cities and towns, and hire non-player character drivers who can use an owned truck to conduct deliveries as a form of passive income for the player.

As players progress, they can acquire additional trucks and trailers at physical dealerships or online, or they can purchase used equivalents that are cheaper but worn down from prior use. The trucks in Euro Truck Simulator 2 are licensed models by real-world truck manufacturers that operate in Europe, namely DAF, Iveco, MAN, Mercedes-Benz, Renault, Scania, and Volvo. Since 2026, the game also features coaches by MAN, Scania, and Volvo; these have their own coach mode separate from the main truck mode, and can deliver passengers instead of cargo on multi-stop routes. At service shops, players can repair their vehicles, replace worn-out or excessively-damaged components, or purchase and install a wide range of vehicle customization options including engine and transmission types; body styles ranging from day cabs to sleeper cabs; paint schemes and liveries; individual vehicle components such as side-view mirrors and grilles; different tires, wheels, and hubcaps; aftermarket accessories such as bullbars, lights, and air horns; and interior items such as air fresheners and other decorative objects. As countries with left-hand traffic are featured in the game, players can purchase trucks with left-hand or right-hand drive configurations and convert their vehicles to use different configurations.

On the road, players can use filling stations to refuel, rest areas to rest, and service shops to repair their vehicle. As they drive, players gradually fill out their map, which marks roads the player has traveled on, named settlements they have passed through, and dealerships and driver recruitment offices they have passed or accessed. Certain landmarks recreated in the game world can be marked by taking a picture of them using the game's photo mode, while others have montages that can be viewed; some of these are only accessible using hidden roadways that only appear on the map when the player drives near them. On some routes during jobs, players may be required to pull into weigh stations, pay tolls, or stop at border stations. Players must also keep in mind which side of the road they must drive on when crossing between left-hand and right-hand traffic jurisdictions, though players cannot actively drive between these points, which require ferry rides or train travel and are separated by loading sections.

Experience points add to the player's level, and from leveling up, players can upgrade skills that improve their performance in different categories based on ADR classifications, such as heavy cargo, fragile cargo, dangerous goods, urgent deliveries, route distance, and eco-driving; these also improve the likelihood of these jobs being offered, and how lucrative these jobs are. Hired drivers have similar skills that also improve with each delivery they complete.

== Setting ==
Map of the countries featured in the game, including DLCs. Dark blue marks regions accessible in the base game, while all other colors denote regions that require DLC packs.

Euro Truck Simulator 2 is set in a condensed 1:19-scaled version of Europe, with primary focus on European Union members. The base game features Austria, Belgium, the Czech Republic, northeastern France, Germany, northern Italy, Luxembourg, Netherlands, western Poland, Bratislava in Slovakia, Switzerland, and Great Britain (the United Kingdom, excluding Northern Ireland and smaller islands). A number of other countries and regions have since been added as paid downloadable content.

Combined with all downloadable map content, the game now covers almost the entirety of Western, Central, and Southern Europe, including Scandinavia, the Baltics, Corsica, Sardinia, East Thrace in Turkey, and Kaliningrad Oblast and western Leningrad Oblast in Russia. Map expansions are available as DLCs. Assuming the player has all the countries available to them, the game features over 370 visitable cities, and thousands of kilometres worth of in-game roads. Currently, the player may travel as far north as Honningsvåg, Norway, as far south as Heraklion, Greece, as far west as Lisbon, Portugal, and as far east as Constanța, Romania. SCS has stated that most future map expansions, if not all, will be at additional cost.

SCS Software also releases free updates to improve and refresh old areas of the map to ensure they maintain modern quality standards similar to newly-added regions, especially considering some areas were ported from older Truck Simulator games. Some areas are also updated ahead of a DLC's release to prepare certain sections for expansions.

== Downloadable content ==
SCS Software has released several other minor expansion packs. Euro Truck Simulator 2 can be enhanced with several paint job packs for trucks, ranging from seasonal repaints to nation-themed repaints.

Other expansion packs expand the game with licensed content from real-life manufacturers: Feldbinder Trailer Pack, Krone Trailer Pack, Schwarzmüller Trailer Pack, Wielton Trailer Pack, Tirsan Trailer Pack, with additional tire, wheel and truck parts modifications from Goodyear, HS-Schoch and Michelin.

In addition, special tuning packs are available for each truck manufacturer besides Iveco and MAN. These packs add more tuning options, ranging from bull bars to branded mugs to all trucks of the selected brand, except for the Renault tuning pack, which only features new tuning parts for the Renault Range T truck.

There are several expansion packs that expand the functionality of the game, including Cabin Accessories DLC (which allows players to personalize their truck interiors), and two DLCs that allow transport of heavy cargo: the Heavy Cargo DLC and the Special Transport DLC. With the Special Transport DLC, players take on special jobs during which they cannot make stops at rest areas, gas stations or deviate away from escort vehicles. The immense size and weight of the cargo within this DLC necessitates extra care and attention, however most of these cargos are mainly transported between one city and the next.

== Development ==
Initially released for Windows and available for purchase and download via SCS's own website, the game was added to Steam in January 2013. Expanding beyond the Windows version, SCS announced in March 2013 that they were developing a Mac version of the game. One month later, they released a Linux beta version of the game to the public through Steam. On 27 February, they stated "the Mac OS port of ETS 2 is taking longer than anybody would like, but trust us, we are still working hard on it."

On 19 December 2014, SCS Software announced on their blog that the OS X version of the game was ready for a public beta available on Steam. On 21 January 2015, a 64-bit version of Euro Truck Simulator 2 was released, which allows for more memory to be used by the game.

In August 2023, SCS Software announced that it would be creating a new generation of their current game engine, Prism3D, in order to provide graphical and performance bonuses to PC players. Listings for PlayStation 5 and Xbox Series X/S were discovered on 18 August 2025.

== Reception ==
Reception

Aggregate score
Aggregator	Score
Metacritic	79/100

Review scores
Publication	Score
Destructoid	8.5/10
PC Gamer (US)	85/100

Awards
Publication	Award
PC Gamer	'The Sim of the Year 2012' Award
Steam Awards	The 'I Thought This Game Was Cool Before It Won An Award' Award [2016]
Steam Awards	The 'Sit Back and Relax' Award [2016]

The game was generally well received by critics, holding a score of 79/100 on Metacritic, indicating "generally favorable reviews".

In a review for Destructoid, James Stephanie Sterling praised the game's accessibility, noting how easy the GPS and map features were to use, as well as the option to stream European internet radio, and the multitude of control options available. They also praised the graphics, stating that "[f]rom the shape of the traffic lights to the atmosphere of the backdrops, there's a sense of individuality to each new territory you uncover, and the trucks themselves are lovingly recreated with an intricate level of detail", although they did criticise the AI of the other vehicles on the road.

In a similarly favourable review, Tim Stone of PC Gamer called it "unexpectedly engrossing", praising the size of the map and the variation of the roads and scenery available. He did, however, have reservations about the accuracy of the surroundings, commenting "no one seems to have told SCS's countryside crafters that rural Britain features long green things called hedges. Cities are often depicted with the shortest of visual shorthand – a few warehouses, the odd landmark if you're lucky."

Rock, Paper, Shotgun listed Euro Truck Simulator 2 ninth on their list of "The 25 Best Simulation Games Ever Made". In 2012, PC Gamer awarded the game with the accolade of "The Sim of The Year 2012".

As of April 2026, Euro Truck Simulator 2 was ranked 5th on the list of the highest-rated Steam games.

=== Multiplayer modification ===
Modification TruckersMP (formerly ETS2MP) added multiplayer to the game in 2013. A volunteer radio station TruckersFM about the modification was set up in 2015. SCS Software added multiplayer as an official feature in 2021.
