= TruckersFM =

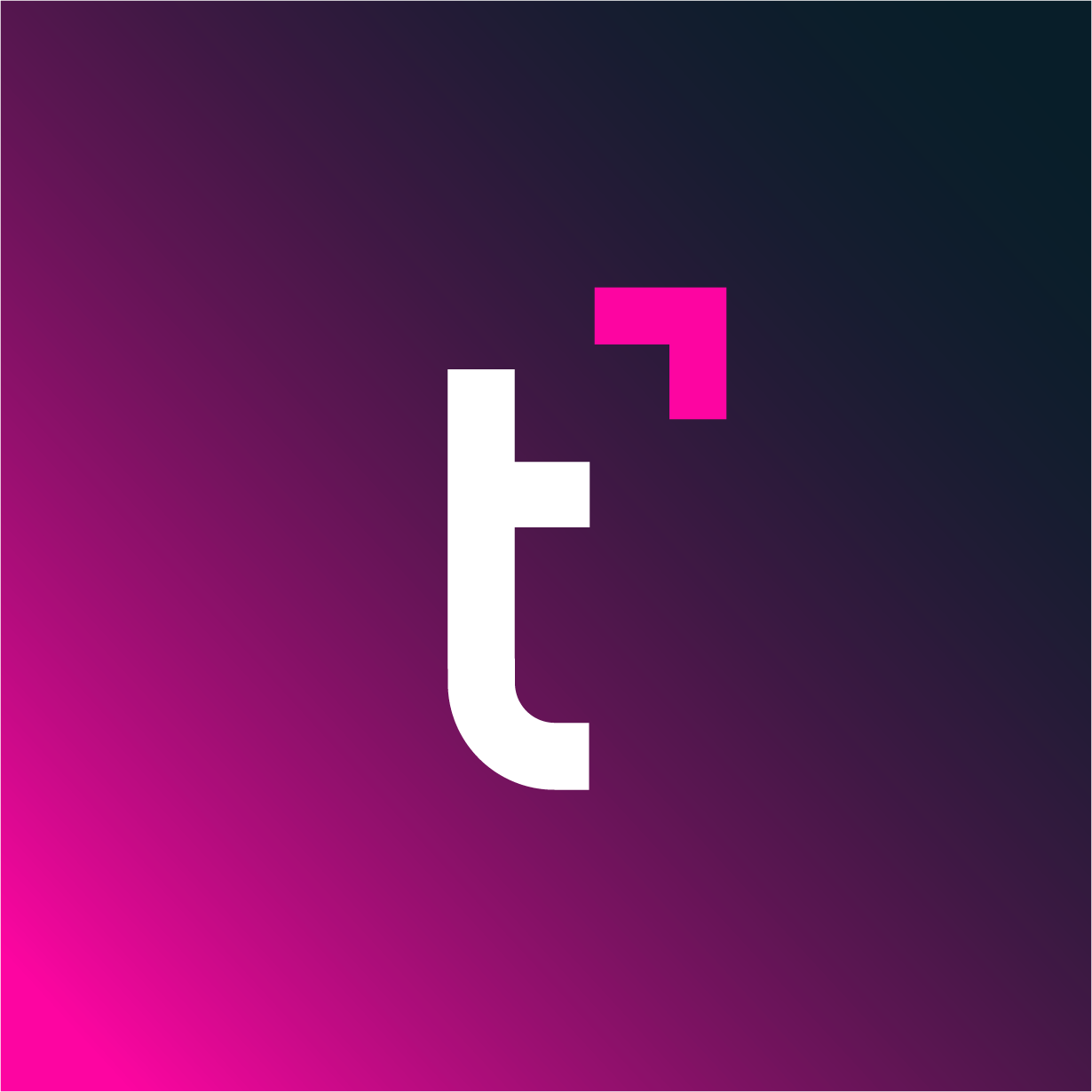
- London; England

Programming
- Language: English
- Format: Contemporary hit radio, hot adult contemporary, pop music, variety

Ownership
- Owner: TFM Media Group
- Sister stations: BigRigFM

History
- First air date: 16 October 2015

Links
- Website: https://truckers.fm/

TruckersFM, also known as Truckers.FM or TFM, is an independent online radio station created by the Euro Truck Simulator 2 and American Truck Simulator community for use in those games, as well as other simulator games such as Farming Simulator. The station was founded in October 2015 by brothers Alexander and Joshua Blackman.

TruckersFM is operated by a team of volunteer radio presenters who broadcast a variety of live shows consisting of music, entertainment, and related gaming news. The station predominately plays chart music, pop music, rock music, and EDM. Their sister radio station, BigRigFM, primarily plays country music. The station is primarily funded by on-air advertising from community-related groups, streamers, and virtual trucking companies, as well as listener donations via Patreon.

TruckersFM is available online, on various audio streaming services such as TuneIn, and on smart speakers such as Amazon Echo. TruckersFM is also integrated directly into the in-game radio directories of several Truck Simulator and Farming Simulator games.

British video game news site Eurogamer describes TruckersFM as "an alternative to listening to real-world radio stations inside a game, (which) has become an alternative to real-world stations out in the real world."

== History ==
Launched in October 2015, TruckersFM was created as a dedicated radio station by the Truck Simulator and TruckersMP multiplayer modification communities. The idea behind the station is to allow players to tune into a radio station that provides news, entertaining stories, virtual traffic reports, and on-air competitions for them to interact with.

TruckersFM was added to the Euro Truck Simulator 2 in-game radio player on 6 January 2016, and later into the American Truck Simulator in-game radio player on 2 February 2016.

On 11 May 2017, TruckersFM gained partner status with Discord. Its Discord community has over 20,000 members, which makes it one of the more popular communities in the music category of servers.

In February 2018, members of the TruckersFM team visited the headquarters of SCS Software, the developers of Euro Truck Simulator 2 and American Truck Simulator. The visit resulted in a closer relationship between the station and game developers, as well as the creation of exclusive radio imaging for TruckersFM, consisting of members of the game's development team reciting the station's slogan.

On 8 August 2019, TruckersFM was added to the Farming Simulator radio directory for players to listen directly in-game while playing.

In October 2019, TruckersMP, the community created multiplayer modification for Euro Truck Simulator 2 and American Truck Simulator, partnered with TruckersFM to provide exclusive updates, official events, and giveaways for the simulation community.

On 26 May 2019, TruckersFM launched a new sister station called BigRigFM, a country music radio station, created to cater specifically to the American 18-wheeler truck drivers section of the Truck Simulator community. This station broadcast without presenters until 23 April 2022, when Cowie presented the official launch show.

On 16 October 2020, TruckersFM celebrated its 5th anniversary of broadcasting with a virtual in-game festival on the Euro Truck Simulator 2 multiplayer modification, TruckersMP. They also partnered with gaming brands and developers such as HyperX, Focus Home Interactive, SCS Software, and Fanatec to give away prizes to listeners and followers on their social media channels.

In September 2026, TruckersFM was recognized by the Guinness World Records as the first community radio station to be officially integrated into a video game, as one of the station's co-founders, Alexander Blackman, would later work at SCS Software in community management.

== Programming ==
TruckersFM broadcasts a variety of programming, produced by a team of volunteer radio presenters based across the world.

It broadcasts around the clock, with programmes such as "The Most Played Chart", "The RAM Show", "Exodus Radio", "The Night Shift", "The Odd Show" , "Groove & Move" and many more.

== Street Team ==
Being a heavily community-orientated radio station, TruckersFM launched its own virtual 'Street Team' in October 2018. The Street Team organize bi-monthly (previously monthly) online convoys and large alternative events on the TruckersMP multiplayer modification, allowing the presenters and staff of TruckersFM to directly interact with the community. These virtual convoys generally see over 400 online players attend and participate, and on occasions have seen between 500 and 700 attendees.

The scale of Street Team Convoys assisted in the creation of a formal partnership with TruckersMP, who noted that TruckersFM "are one of the largest communities that contributes significantly to TruckersMP on a regular basis."
