= Farming Simulator 2012 =

2012 video game

- The icon for the 3DS release
- Developers: Giants Software (3DS); Astragon (iOS)
- Publishers: EU: Excalibur Publishing (3DS); NA: Focus Home Interactive (3DS); WW: Astragon (iOS); WW: Giants Software (Android)
- Series: Farming Simulator
- Platforms: Nintendo 3DS, iOS, Android
- Release: Nintendo 3DS: EU: March 30, 2012; NA: June 23, 2013; iOS; July 30, 2012; Android; January 9, 2013
- Genre: Simulation
- Mode: Single-player

Farming Simulator 2012 (Farming Simulator 3D for the U.S. 3DS version) is a simulation video game in the Farming Simulator series, developed by Giants Software and Astragon for Nintendo 3DS, iOS, and Android in 2012-2013.

== Reception ==
Reception

Aggregate score
Aggregator	Score	
Aggregator	3DS	iOS
Metacritic	60/100	59/100

Review scores
Publication	Score	
Publication	3DS	iOS
4Players	65%	N/A
Famitsu	21/40	N/A
GamesMaster	N/A	57%
Nintendo Life	6/10	N/A
Pocket Gamer	3.5/5	3/5
Digital Spy	N/A	2/5

The 3DS and iOS versions received "mixed" reviews according to the review aggregation website Metacritic. In Japan, where the 3DS version was ported and published by Intergrow under the name Farming Simulator 3D: Pocket Nōen (ファーミングシミュレーター3D ポケット農園, Fāmingu Shimyurētā 3D Poketto Nōen; lit. "Farming Simulator 3D: Pocket Plantation") on April 4, 2013, Famitsu gave it a score of two sixes, one four, and one five for a total of 21 out of 40.
