= Farming Simulator 2013 =

2012 video game

- Developer: Giants Software
- Publisher: Focus Home Interactive
- Series: Farming Simulator
- Platforms: Microsoft Windows, Mac OS, PlayStation 3, Xbox 360
- Release: Windows: NA: October 25, 2012; PAL: November 2, 2012; Mac OS X: NA: February 6, 2013; EU: February 7, 2013; PlayStation 3, Xbox 360: EU: September 6, 2013; AU: September 12, 2013; NA: November 19, 2013; Titanium Edition: NA: October 9, 2013; AU: October 17, 2013; EU: October 18, 2013
- Genre: Simulation
- Mode: Single-player

Farming Simulator 2013 (known as simply Farming Simulator for handheld and console versions) is a simulation video game in the Farming Simulator series, developed and published by Giants Software and Focus Home Interactive for Microsoft Windows in 2012, and for Mac OS X, PlayStation 3, and Xbox 360 in 2013.

== Reception ==
Reception

Aggregate score
Aggregator	Score
Metacritic	(PC) 65/100 (PS3) 40/100 (X360) 33/100

Review scores
Publication	Score
Eurogamer	(X360) 3/10
Famitsu	32/40
GamesMaster	(PS3) 35%
Hardcore Gamer	(PS3) 2.5/5
IGN	(PC) 7.1/10
PlayStation Official Magazine – UK	(PS3) 3/10
Official Xbox Magazine (US)	(X360) 3.5/10
PC PowerPlay	(PC) 5/10
Push Square	(PS3) 4/10
The Digital Fix	(PC) 6/10
Digital Spy	(X360) 2/5

The PC version received "mixed" reviews, while the PlayStation 3 and Xbox 360 versions received "unfavorable" reviews, according to the review aggregation website Metacritic. In Japan, where the console versions were ported and published by Russel on September 5, 2013, Famitsu gave them each a score of two nines and two sevens for a total of 32 out of 40.

The Digital Fix gave the PC version a score of six out of ten, calling it "a great management game, a great online experience and the ability to draw rude things in a field with a combine harvester." However, Digital Spy gave the Xbox 360 version two stars out of five, saying that it was "unintentionally entertaining at times, providing retrospective moments of amusement with its dodgy physics and tedious activities. But while it may capture the long, gruelling process of maintaining a farm, it doesn't do enough to maintain your attention." Metro gave the same console version one out of ten, saying, "Surreally awful on almost every level, the strangest thing about Farming Simulator is how little effort it makes at... simulating farming."
