= American Truck Simulator =

2016 video game

- Developer: SCS Software
- Publisher: SCS Software
- Series: Truck Simulator
- Platforms: Microsoft Windows; macOS; Linux; PlayStation 5; Xbox Series X/S
- Release: February 2, 2016
- Genre: Vehicle simulation
- Modes: Single-player, multiplayer

American Truck Simulator is a 2016 truck simulator game developed and published by SCS Software for Microsoft Windows, Linux, and macOS. It is the fifth installment in the Truck Simulator series, a spiritual successor to the 18 Wheels of Steel series, and serves as a parallel or companion game to Euro Truck Simulator 2. The game was released on Steam on February 2, 2016.

American Truck Simulator is set in a condensed depiction of the contiguous United States, featuring American conventional semi-trucks and various real-world cities, roads, landmarks, and other locations. Players transport and deliver a variety of cargo while managing their business and maintaining their fleet of licensed trucks and cars.

American Truck Simulator was first announced as being in development in September 2013, and was unveiled at E3 2015. It was released in 2016 to positive reviews and continues to receive considerable updates and downloadable content releases. As of 2026, the game has sold over 6 million copies. A port of the game to the Xbox Series X/S and the PlayStation 5 is planned for 2026.

== Gameplay ==
Gameplay screenshot of a player driving a Western Star 49X

American Truck Simulator is a truck driving simulator with elements of a business simulation game. Players drive trucks and cars in an open world rendition of the United States, delivering cargo to a designated location to receive monetary payments and experience points. To get the most money and experience points from their delivery jobs, players must obey traffic laws, avoid damaging their vehicle or cargo, manage their vehicle's fuel and the cost of refueling, optionally handle driving fatigue and the time loss when stopping to rest, and deliver the cargo on time. Payment and experience points are also determined by the distance traveled and the type of goods being transported.

At the start of the game, players select a home city to start their logistics business, acquiring the truck garage in that city. Players must first complete "quick jobs" as a freelancer using other companies' trucks in different locations to save up to purchase their own truck, or take out a loan for quick money. Once a player acquires their own truck, they can complete jobs using it, though they must drive themselves to the location of the trailer to activate the job. Players can also purchase their own trailers, though that still requires driving to the origin location of a job with the correct trailer to load the cargo. As the player's business grows, they can upgrade their garages, purchase new garages in other cities and towns, and hire non-player character drivers who can use an owned truck to conduct deliveries as a form of passive income for the player.

As players progress, they can purchase additional trucks and trailers at physical dealerships or online, or they can purchase used equivalents that are cheaper but are already worn down from prior use. The trucks in American Truck Simulator are licensed models by real-world truck manufacturers that operate in North America, namely Freightliner, International, Kenworth, Mack, Peterbilt, Volvo, and Western Star. Since 2026, the game also features cars by Ford, Dodge, and Ram; these have their own car mode separate from the main truck mode, and can deliver lighter, cheaper cargo without needing a trailer, though they are mostly intended to be used to explore the map. At service shops, players can repair their vehicles, replace worn-out or excessively-damaged components, or purchase and install a wide range of vehicle customization options including engine and transmission types; body styles ranging from day cabs to sleeper cabs; paint schemes and liveries; individual vehicle components such as side-view mirrors and stack exhausts; different tires, wheels, and hubcaps; aftermarket accessories such as bullbars, lights, and air horns; and interior items such as air fresheners and other decorative objects.

On the road, players can use gas stations to refuel, rest stops to rest, and service shops to repair their vehicle. As they drive, players gradually fill out their map, which marks roads the player has traveled on, named settlements they have passed through, and dealerships and driver recruitment offices they have passed or accessed. Certain landmarks recreated in the game world can be marked by taking a picture of them using the game's photo mode, while others have sightseeing montages that can be viewed; some of these are only accessible using unmarked roadways that only appear on the map when the player drives near them. On some routes during jobs, players may be required to pull into weigh stations, pay tolls, or stop at border stations such as the California Border Protection Stations.

Experience points add to the player's level, and from leveling up, players can upgrade skills that improve their performance in different categories, such as heavy cargo, fragile cargo, dangerous goods, urgent deliveries, delivery route distance, and fuel efficiency; these also improve the likelihood of these jobs being offered, and how lucrative these jobs are. Hired drivers have similar skills that also improve with each delivery they complete.

== Setting ==
Map of the states and provinces featured in the game. In blue are states that are part of the base game; in green are states released as part of a free DLC; in yellow are states released as part of a paid DLC; and in orange are states and provinces confirmed to be part of a future paid DLC.

American Truck Simulator is set in a condensed 1:20-scaled version of the United States. At launch, the game started off with the U.S. states of California and Nevada. Arizona was released in June 2016 as a free update to all players. A number of other states have now been added as paid downloadable content.

Combined with all downloadable map content, the game now covers the entire Western Contiguous and South Central regions, including part of the Midwestern region. Map expansions are available for New Mexico, Oregon, Washington, Utah, Idaho, Colorado, Wyoming, Montana, Texas, Oklahoma, Kansas, Nebraska, Arkansas, Missouri, Iowa, Louisiana, Illinois and South Dakota as DLCs. Assuming the player has all the states available to them, the game features over 250 visitable cities, including most state capitals and major cities, as well as many thousands of miles worth of in-game roads. Currently, the player may travel as far north as Bellingham, Washington, as far south as Brownsville, Texas, as far west as Eureka, California, and as far east as Chicago, Illinois. SCS has stated that most future map expansions, if not all, will be at additional cost.

SCS Software also releases free updates to improve and refresh old areas of the map to ensure they maintain modern quality standards similar to newly-added regions. Some areas are also updated ahead of a DLC's release to prepare certain sections for expansions.

== Development ==
SCS Software announced American Truck Simulator on September 6, 2013. It was revealed at E3 in 2015.

On April 11, 2014, SCS Software announced that there will be 100+ cities in the game once completed (not initially), and SCS released screenshots of the game. SCS plans to eventually include the entire contiguous United States, as long as the game continues to do well. On 26 January 2015, SCS published a one-hour video to YouTube of footage from the early alpha of the game. On December 18, 2015, SCS announced the official release date for American Truck Simulator, February 3, 2016, on their blog. The game was released one day earlier instead. The game was released for PC-DVD on December 14, 2017. Automotive brands included in American Truck Simulator so far are Freightliner, International, Kenworth, Mack, Peterbilt, Volvo, Western Star, Ford, Dodge, and Ram; more are expected to follow once licensing is secured.

Since the game was launched, the developers have continued regular DLC releases of U.S. states, unique cargo, and more. The most recent state to be added was South Dakota, which was released on September 24, 2026. On October 27, 2025, SCS announced a map extension for British Columbia, a province of Canada, which, when released in 2027, will be the first time the game covers areas outside of the United States.

== Reception ==
Reception

Aggregate score
Aggregator	Score
Metacritic	76/100

Review scores
Publication	Score
Destructoid	85%
Edge	70%
Eurogamer	70%
IGN	8/10
Polygon	8/10
Hardcore Gamer	4/5
PC Gamer	80/100

American Truck Simulator has received mostly positive reviews from critics, scoring 76/100 on Metacritic.

James Cunningham of Hardcore Gamer gave the game a 4 out of 5 saying, "While a little more realism would make American Truck Simulator more fun, paradoxical as that may sound, there's no escaping how fantastically playable it is." Laura Dale from Polygon rated the game a 8/10 saying, "As someone who sunk countless hours into Euro Truck Simulator 2, a fresh coat of paint, an unfamiliar set of sights and the challenge of driving on the wrong opposite side of the road left me confident that I'll be sinking just as many hours into American Truck Simulator."

Andy Kelly of PC Gamer commended the game and noted that it shared the strengths and shortcomings of its predecessor due to the two games' similarities, though advised that it was not finished on launch and urged more cautious gamers to wait until it was more completed before purchasing the game.

American Truck Simulator won Best Technological Solution at the 2016 Czech Game of the Year Awards, and was also nominated for Best Game, Best PC/Console Game, and Best Audio.

== See also ==
- TruckersFM, an online radio station created by the game's community
