= Bus Simulator 21 =

2021 vehicle simulation video game

- Cover art of the game featuring Mercedes-Benz Citaro
- Developer: Stillalive Studios
- Publisher: Astragon
- Series: Bus Simulator
- Engine: Unreal Engine 4
- Platforms: Microsoft Windows; PlayStation 4; PlayStation 5; Xbox One; Xbox Series X/S
- Release: Windows, PlayStation 4, Xbox One; WW: 7 September 2021; PlayStation 5, Xbox Series X/S; WW: 16 May 2023
- Genre: Vehicle simulation
- Modes: Single-player, multiplayer

Bus Simulator 21 is a bus simulator game developed by Stillalive Studios and published by Astragon Entertainment. It is developed on the Unreal Engine 4. It is the sixth in the Bus Simulator series, and is the direct sequel to Bus Simulator 18. The game has been released on 7 September 2021 for Microsoft Windows, PlayStation 4 and Xbox One.

== Gameplay ==
Bus Simulator 21 takes place in "Angel Shores", a new fictional modern city located in the United States which is based on the San Francisco Bay Area. The game features a coastline and districts like Chinatown. In addition to the California map, the game will have a revised "Seaside Valley" map from its predecessor Bus Simulator 18. Vehicle-wise, the game introduces a double-decker bus, such as the officially-licensed Alexander Dennis Enviro500, as well as electric buses to the series. Further licensed bus brands include Blue Bird, BYD, Grande West, Iveco, MAN, Mercedes-Benz, Scania, Setra and Volvo. The game also offers a cooperative multiplayer mode. A career mode would be available following the Next Stop major update.

== Development ==
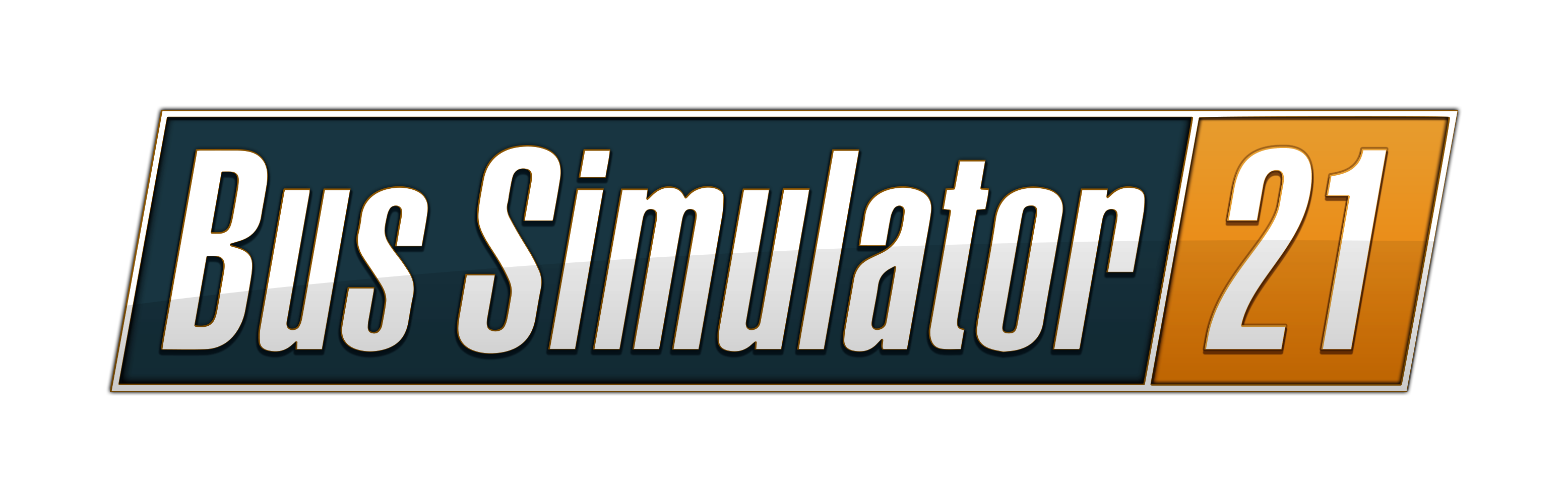
Logo

Stillalive Studios and Astragon Entertainment will remain as the series developer and publisher respectively. The game was targeted for a 2021 release for Microsoft Windows, PlayStation 4 and Xbox One. The release date was later confirmed on 7 September 2021.

== Next Stop DLC ==
The Next Stop DLC is an expansion to Bus Simulator 21. It was released on 16 May 2023, one week earlier than expected, bringing dedicated versions of the game to PlayStation 5 and Xbox Series X/S. The Next Stop DLC also includes new features, including:

- Ebusco Bus Pack (Available on release)
- Angel Shores Map Extensions (Available on release)
- School Bus Extension (Available August 31, 2023)
- Thomas Built Buses Bus Pack (Available September 22, 2023)
- Tram Extension (Available Q4 2023)

The Angel Shores map extension is available to all players for free, while all the other new features can either be bought separately as they release, or as a season pass bundle at a discounted price.

On top of the new content players can take advantage of, the game includes new NPVs (non-player vehicles) to add to the realism of the game, including planes, trains, and trucks.

== Reception ==
Reception

Aggregate score
Aggregator	Score
Metacritic	PC: 73/100; PS4: 60/100; XONE: 69/100

Review scores
Publication	Score
GameStar	70/100
Push Square	6/10

Bus Simulator 21 received "mixed or average" reviews according to review aggregator Metacritic.
