= Bus Simulator =

Vehicle-simulation video game series

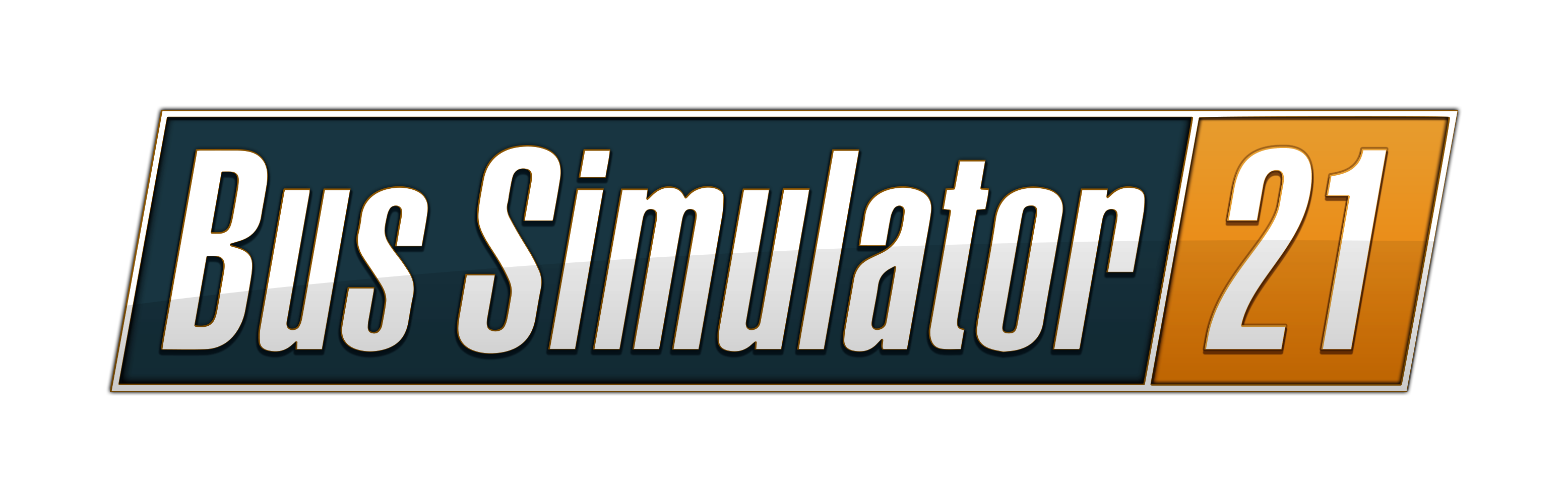
- Logo of Bus Simulator 21
- Genre: Vehicle simulation
- Developers: Contendo Media; TML Studios; Stillalive Studios; Simteract
- Publisher: Astragon Entertainment
- Platforms: Android; macOS; iOS; Microsoft Windows; Nintendo Switch; PlayStation 4; PlayStation 5; Xbox One; Xbox Series X/S
- First release: Bus Simulator 2008; 13 December 2007
- Latest release: Bus Simulator 27; 8 September 2026

Bus Simulator is a vehicle-simulation video game series developed by Icebytes, Contendo Media, TML Studios, Stillalive Studios and Simteract, and published by Astragon Entertainment. The franchise was introduced in 2007 by Astragon Entertainment. The latest installment, titled Bus Simulator 27, was released on 8 September 2026.

== Games ==
Release timeline
2007	Bus Simulator 2008
2008
2009	Bus Simulator 2009
2010
2011
2012	Bus Simulator 2012
2013
2014
2015
2016	Bus Simulator 16
2017
2018	Bus Simulator 18
2019
2020
2021	Bus Simulator 21
2022	Bus Simulator City Ride
2023
2024
2025
2026	Bus Simulator 27

Aggregate review scores As of 8 June 2022.
Game	Year	Metacritic
Bus Simulator 16	2016	PC: 46/100
Bus Simulator 18	2018, 2019	PC: 67/100; PS4: 61/100; XONE: 60/100
Bus Simulator 21	2021	PC: 73/100; PS4: 60/100; XONE: 69/100

=== Bus Simulator 16 (2016) ===
The fourth video game in the series was announced in July 2015. The game was scheduled to release on 20 January 2016 for Microsoft Windows and macOS, but it was postponed to 3 March 2016 due to technical issues.

=== Bus Simulator 18 (2018) ===
The fifth installment in the series was revealed in May 2018. It was available for Microsoft Windows on 13 June 2018 worldwide. The release of the PlayStation 4 and Xbox One versions followed in August 2019 under the title Bus Simulator.

=== Bus Simulator 21 (2021) ===
The sixth installment in the series was revealed on 11 August 2020. It was released for Microsoft Windows, PlayStation 4 and Xbox One on 7 September 2021. PlayStation 5 and Xbox Series X/S was released on 23 May 2023.

=== Bus Simulator City Ride (2022) ===
Bus Simulator City Ride was announced on 2 June 2022. It was released for Android, iOS and Nintendo Switch on October 13, 2022.

=== Bus Simulator 27 (2026) ===
The seventh installment in the series was revealed in July 2025, developed by a new video game developer Simteract with Unreal Engine 5. The game was available on PlayStation 5, Windows and Xbox Series X/S on 8 September 2026.
