= Fishing: Barents Sea =

2018 video game

- Steam art
- Developer: Misc Games
- Publisher: Astragon
- Engine: Unreal Engine 4
- Platforms: Microsoft Windows, Xbox One, PlayStation 4, Nintendo Switch
- Release: February 7, 2018
- Genre: Simulation
- Mode: Single-player

Fishing: Barents Sea is a commercial fishing simulation video game developed by Misc Games, released on Microsoft Windows. It is the first title available on Steam to be released by Misc Games, a video game developer based in Stavanger, Norway.

== Downloadable content ==
Two downloadable content (DLC) packs were made for the game. The first, Line and Net Ships, was released on August 9, 2018. The second, King Crab, was released on November 13, 2018. The game and its two DLCs were bundled together as Fishing: Barents Sea Complete Edition, released on December 10, 2019 on the Nintendo Switch, PlayStation 4 and Xbox One.

== Reception ==
According to review aggregator Metacritic, Fishing: Barents Sea has received mixed reviews and has a score of 69.
