= Police Simulator: Patrol Officers =

2021 police simulation video game

- Developer: Aesir Interactive
- Publisher: Astragon
- Engine: Unreal Engine 4
- Platforms: Microsoft Windows; PlayStation 4; PlayStation 5; Xbox One; Xbox Series X/S; Nintendo Switch
- Release: WW: 10 November 2022
- Genre: Simulation video game
- Modes: Single-player, multiplayer

Police Simulator: Patrol Officers is a law enforcement simulation video game developed by Aesir Interactive and published by Astragon Entertainment for Windows, PlayStation 4, PlayStation 5, Xbox One, and Xbox Series X/S. The game was first released in early access through Steam on June 17, 2021, and was fully released on November 10, 2022. It received mixed reception from critics.

== Gameplay ==
Police Simulator: Patrol Officers is set in the open world of Brighton, a fictional American city loosely based on Boston and Suffolk County, in the fictional U.S. state of Franklin. The player character of the game is an officer of the Brighton Police Department.

Gameplay is divided into "shifts", which are divided into morning, evening, and night duties. Players can choose to conduct a foot patrol or a vehicle patrol in their assigned beat, which they must patrol to handle crimes they witness or callouts sent by dispatch, ranging from minor crimes like jaywalking, moving violations, and theft to serious offenses like assaults, drug trafficking, and robberies. The player has access to a variety of tools such as a handgun, a taser, handcuffs, a radar speed gun, a flashlight, a camera, road flares, a pull-over sign, a citation book, a mobile data terminal, and others, as well as a fleet of police cars. Similar to the Police Quest series, the player must follow a loose system of police regulations including a use of force continuum while on duty, such as properly handling and processing suspects and choosing whether to fine, arrest, or warn suspects based on their offenses. Proper performance, measured by a count of "Conduct Points" that starts at 100 and decreases with improper performance, earns "Shift Points", which serve as experience points. By collecting enough experience points, the player can rank up and collect "Duty Stars" that unlock new tools, vehicles, and events.

== Development ==
Police Simulator: Patrol Officers is being developed by German developer Aesir Interactive and published by Astragon Entertainment with public funding by FilmFernsehFonds Bayern. It was announced on February 10, 2021. The game released in early access on June 17, 2021, for PC on Steam. Regular updates were released since early access, including a cooperative multiplayer mode for up to two players. A public roadmap is available on Trello, laying out current and future plans.

The game left Steam Early Access and fully launched on PC, PlayStation 4, PlayStation 5, Xbox One, and Xbox Series X/S on November 10, 2022.

On June 17, 2024, the Highway Patrol Expansion DLC was released, expanding the world with a highway leading out of the city and adding content for highway patrol and commercial vehicle enforcement.

== Reception ==
Reception

Aggregate score
Aggregator	Score
Metacritic	PS5: 58/100; XSXS:48/100

On Metacritic, the PlayStation 5 version of the game had an average score of 58 out of 100 with a rating of "Mixed or Average", while the Xbox Series X/S version had 48 out of 100 with a rating of "Generally Unfavorable".

German magazine GameStar called patrolling entertaining and said Patrol Simulator's early access version had potential. GameStar criticized the quality of animations, the AI, and a lack of replayability reasons but still said that it is the best police simulator. A staff review from Softpedia rated the game 4 out of 5 stars, praising its concept and mission progression but criticizing what they felt were dismal graphics and repetitive gameplay.

== DLC's ==
Name	Release date	DLC Summary	Citation
Urban Terrain Vehicle	10 November 2022	New car added. Car can allow you to arrest up to 4 people at a time.	
Compact Police Vehicle	18 July 2023	New car added. Able to be used on foot patrols and drive along parks and narrow streets.	
Multipurpose Police Vehicle	19 October 2023	New car added. Allows you to tow civilian vehicles damaged in accidents and increases trunk inventory size.	
Surveillance Police Vehicle	5 December 2023	New car added. Adds surveillance camera to record multitude of car-related felonies.	
Guardian Police Vehicle	5 December 2023	New car added. Allows you to transport up to 6 criminals.	
Warden Police Vehicle	12 March 2024	New car added. Features light bar that can display messages.	
Highway Patrol Expansion	17 June 2024	Adds highway / new calls / new tools and 2 new cars added.	
Special Police Vehicle Pack	13 August 2024	Contains 9 police cars previously released with 5 different skin sets and 2 uniforms in a pack.	
Unmarked Police Vehicle Pack	13 August 2024	Adds 5 undercover skins and contains 9 police vehicle previously released in a pack.	
Tropical Taskforce Pack	3 September 2024	Adds 6 summerly undercover uniforms.	
Fast Pursuit Police Vehicle	9 October 2024	New car added. Features launch control and great handling.	
Season Pass	20 May 2025	Vehicle customization pack, Adventurer Police Vehicle, Accident Pack, Vanguard Police Vehicle, Cotraband Expansion.	
Vehicle Customization Pack	20 May 2025	Customize police vehicles with over 30 different partsand accessories.	
Adventurer Police Vehicle	22 July 2025	New car added.	
Accident Pack	17 September 2025	New officer outfits, new vehicle, orange accident lightbar, new car skin, 2 new sirons.	
East Coast Police Uniform Pack	17 September 2025	2 Liberty uniforms, 2 Vernon uniforms and 1 pristine uniform.	
South Atlantic Police Uniform Pack	17 September 2025	2 Sunshine uniforms, 2 Justice uniforms, 2 Mountain uniforms.	
Western Police Uniform Pack	17 September 2025	2 Angels uniform. 2 Metropolis uniform and 1 Violet Crown uniform.	
Vanguard Police Vehicle	30 October 2025	New car added.	
Contraband Expansion	19 November 2025	2 border stations linked to the highway, Document, vehicle, and person checks at entry points, Stationary inspections with dynamic situations, More arrest scenarios and suspect resistance, First inspection: booth with spike strips & CCTV, Secondary inspection: search trunks, interiors, engines, Biometric kiosk with citizen data, Inspection mirror for finding hidden contraband, Substance analyser for drugs/chemicals, Less-lethal rifle to stop fleeing NPCs, Titan Police SUV for patrols & pursuits, Dynamic Situations, NPCs may flee, initiating chases that are expanded with the Highway DLC, Border tower to spot trespassers, Fence control & binoculars for perimeter security.	
