= SimplePlanes =

Flight simulation video game

- Developer: Jundroo LLC
- Publisher: Jundroo LLC
- Engine: Unity
- Platforms: iOS, Android, OS X, Microsoft Windows
- Release: iOS, Android, Mac and Windows: WW: 10 December 2014; Steam: WW: 17 December 2015
- Genres: Simulation, open-world, sandbox
- Modes: Single-player, multi-player (with mod)

SimplePlanes is a simulation video game (It's a paid game) developed and published by the American indie studio Jundroo LLC. SimplePlanes followed the release of SimplePhysics, SimpleRockets, preceded Juno: New Origins (formerly SimpleRockets 2) and SimplePlanes VR. The game was first released on Mac OS X,Microsoft Windows and was ported to iOS and Android later. It was released onto Steam on 17 December 2015 after completing the Steam Greenlight process. The game received mixed reviews from users and video game reviewers, with the main downfalls mentioned the most being the "slippery controls" and the graphical design. Regardless, it has garnered an online community, many of whom are attracted to its versatility. From 2014 until 2023, SimplePlanes has received 12 major updates and numerous bug fixes and patches. The latest version, v1.12.211, was released in 14 August 2026. Exact user statistics are not available, but there are at least 500,000 registered users on the game's website, responsible for the creation of almost 1 million aircraft.

== Gameplay ==
In SimplePlanes the player is able to build aircraft, vehicles, and other contraptions using a small but versatile selection of parts. Creations are saved in the form of XML files, meaning that players can modify their crafts beyond the limits imposed by the game. Creations can be uploaded to or downloaded from SimplePlanes.com, a social-network-like website that allows players to upload their aircraft to public profiles, rate other players' creations through upvotes, discuss the game via forums, and browse a gallery of other players' designs.

In SimplePlanes, parts can be reshaped by the player to create the complex curves of any aircraft. The fuselage block is a cross-section with customization of corner style (hard corners or different variations of curved ones), length and offsets, and the fuselage can smoothly blend between different cross-sections. Sections can be hollow or solid and can feature intakes, cones and side cuts. Players specify the wingspan, chords and offsets of a wing section. Control surfaces can be customized and bound to different inputs or Funky Trees expressions. Aerodynamics, weights and fuel volumes are automatically updated when parts are modified.

Parts like engines, rotators, wheels and cannons are customizable in that the player can change their size, power, controls, etc. Custom cockpit instrumentation can be created and made to display flight parameters. Moving parts, such as actuated doors, bomb bays, and custom landing gear can be created with rotators and pistons. The game features a wide range of munitions ranging from machine guns and cannons to bombs and torpedoes . The game provides a scripting language/editor named Funky Trees (FT), which allows players to run inputs or variables through mathematical and logical functions before passing them to parts. This system is useful for many aspects of vehicle creation such as input smoothing, custom autopilot, or complex mechanical movement. Many creations on the game's website have utilized Funky Trees to some extent, with perhaps the most notable example being IzzyIA's simplistic recreation of the 1993 video game Doom.

The game's physics simulation means that lift, thrust, drag, center of mass, among other variables, are continuously calculated. Many factors are included, such as a shift in center of mass due to the depletion of fuel or the decrease in lift at high altitude. Players can add or modify parts to directly change aspects of their creation's performance. The game does feature destruction, all parts are destructible and have hidden "health bars" that determine when they break due to impact or enemy weaponry.

At any time, players can load their creations into the game's map, an archipelago which contains five different islands with unique features, (4 on iOS or Android). The five islands each have unique environments/biomes. The islands include airports and other ground objects. Boats, bridges, and convoys appear on the map and players can interact with or destroy them. SimplePlanes contains challenge modes, including short tutorial-type activities such as the "Take-Off Tutorial" and the "Landing Tutorial" as well as the more advanced "SAM Evasion" and "Trench Run".

The game supports modding, allowing advanced users to create custom parts, vehicles, UI, levels, and challenge. Two popular utility mods have been integrated into the base game. On Windows, MacOS and Linux, SimplePlanes mods can be downloaded from SimplePlanes.com. Some mods are also hosted on the Steam Workshop. Mods can be created with a special Unity plugin that is shipped with the game. The Android version of the game once supported modding, but Play Store regulations were updated to require 64-bit support. This meant that SimplePlanes could not include the 32-bit Mono backend they relied on for mod support, instead being forced to switch to the less versatile IL2CPP backend. Mods that do not involve scripts may continue to work in some cases, but there is no official support.

== Locations ==
The game has a menu that allows players to spawn at or teleport their creation to a list of locations.

There are 3 types of Locations:

1. Default: Locations that are included in the list by default.
2. Discovered: The player must visit the location to unlock it.
3. Custom: The player can add their plane's current location as a Custom location at any time.

As of V1.12, there are 8 Default Locations and 21 Discoverable Locations across five islands.

1. Wright Isles (3 Default, 3 Discovered)
2. Krakabloa (5 Default)
3. Snowstone (6 Discovered)
4. Sky Park City (4 Discovered)
5. Maywar Island (7 Discovered)

== Game Versions ==
While versions of the game across PC, Android, and iOS are largely the same, there are a few important differences. The PC version is the only one that supports modding. It offers realtime reflections and translucent water, as well as a higher quality "ceiling" for many of its settings. It is the only version to include Maywar Island and the Kraken easter egg. Android may have limited compatibility with "map" mods, but does not officially support modding, due to Google moving away from 32-bit support. The iOS version is limited to 60 frames per second. The App Store release of SimplePlanes for MacOS does not support mods, the release for third-party platforms such as Steam or GOG does.

== Compatibility ==
The game supports Windows 7 or later, macOS 10.13 or later, Android 6.0 or later, and iOS 12.0 or later. It does function on Linux through the Proton translation layer and was given a "Deck Verified" badge on Steam. Hardware requirements are fairly minimal, requiring as little as an intel Core 2 Duo and 2gb of RAM, according to the game's Steam Listing.

== SimplePlanes VR ==
SimplePlanes VR (often abbreviated SPVR) is another game for virtual reality headsets, sold separately on Steam and the Meta Quest Store. It was released on 17 December 2021. The game supports most PC-compatible VR headsets. With the handheld controls, the player can interact with many in-game buttons and levers. Unlike SimplePlanes, players cannot build or edit any aircraft, being limited to downloading VR-friendly aircraft from the website.

Website curators

Website curators have the role of "curating" crafts which work in SimplePlanes VR. If a craft is curated, it will receive 30 points upon upvote instead of 15. A craft which works in VR is built up of cockpit parts which are all interactive, making a smooth and immersive VR experience.

== SimplePlanes 2 ==
SimplePlanes 2 (SP2) is the continuation of the SimplePlanes franchise. The beta received three open playtest periods, in which players could test the game's features and provide feedback. The early access release was initially due on the 28th of April, but due to another sandbox game, s&box, releasing on the same date, Jundroo decided to shift the date to April 23, at a 10 percent discount for the first 14 days after release.

"We had kind of an awkward realization that s&box, a spiritual successor to Garry's Mod, was also releasing on the 28th. This is good news for all manner of sandbox game players, but given that SP2 is itself a sandbox game and therefore the two games have an overlapping target audience, we're worried launching on the same day as them could throw a wrench in our marketing efforts for release considering our smaller following."

SimplePlanes 2 contains various new features including hole carving, underwater parts, in-game characters, an upgraded physics engine, increased vehicle realism, official multiplayer support, a new map, and improved visual and auditory effects.

== Development ==
Following the release of games SimpleRockets and SimplePhysics, Jundroo LLC released SimplePlanes on Windows and Mac OS X. Soon after it was ported to iOS and Android. The Windows and OSX versions were first sold on Gumroad but when SimplePlanes was released onto Valve's Steam on 17 December 2015 after going through the Steam Greenlight process, all sales were moved there. All purchasers from Gumroad received a free Steam key. Mac copies were also sold via the Mac App Store. Those who purchased the game through this method had to email the receipt for a Steam key. The game received regular updates with new parts and locations, but the update rate became slower when the developers switched focus to Juno: New Origins and SimplePlanes VR, until the last update v1.12.200 beta in September 2023. On April 26, 2024, Jundroo announced their newest upcoming game, SimplePlanes 2, expected to release around 2025, but was delayed to April 2026.

== Reception ==
SimplePlanes received "mixed or average" reviews, according to Metacritic, where it garnered a score of 69/100, but has very positive ratings on Steam and an average rating of 4.5+/5.0 stars on the App Store. The biggest issue critics had was the process of building. Nadia Oxford, a writer for Gamezebo gave SimplePlanes a 4/5 for its realistic flight challenges, sandbox mode and the amount of building options. The review was weighed down by the lack of tutorials and how "getting pieces to fit together doesn't always go as planned". Jordan Minor from 148Apps criticized the game for its "slippery controls" and he noted the environment was "ugly, muddy and blocky". He compared the graphics to "a poor man's Wii Sports Resort" and said the planes looked like small wooden toys with the best compliment he could give the game being "who knows if the aerodynamic knowledge players learn from SimplePlanes can actually transfer over into the real world? But, gameplay and visual gripes aside, the fact that it at least feels like it can is probably the best compliment this game can get". Ben Schwan, a writer for the German website Heise Online also criticized the building mechanics. Mark Steighner, a writer for Hardcore Gamer did not criticize the controls but instead commented on the lack of charisma that games like Kerbal Space Program have. He also addressed the novelty issue and how after a while the game can get boring.
