= Schwarzmüller =

Schwarzmüller Group
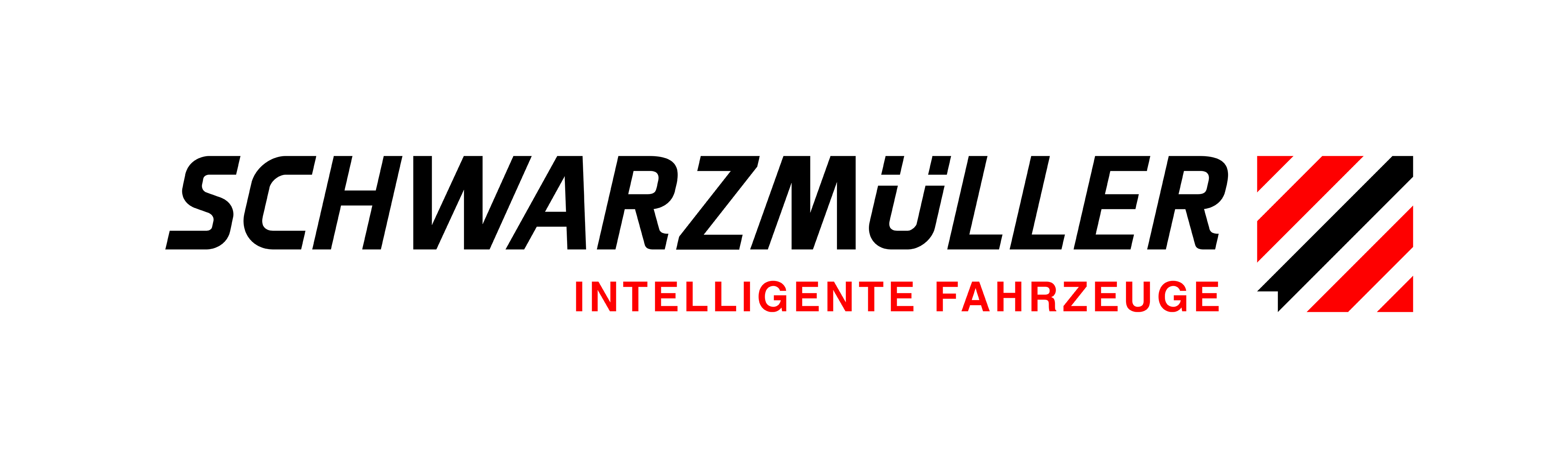
- Company type: Limited liability company
- Industry: commercial trailers
- Founded: 1870 (Legal structure: 1970)
- Headquarters: Freinberg, Upper Austria
- Products: commercial trailers
- Revenue: €349M (2017)
- Owners: Roland Hartwig, CEO; Michael Weigand, CSO; Georg Preschern, CFO
- Number of employees: 2,290 (total), 850 (Austria)
- Website: www.schwarzmueller.com

Schwarzmüller Group, is an Austrian supplier of towed commercial vehicles.

In 2016, the company employed 2,200 employees, of these around 850 in Austria. Since January 2016 the company is led by Roland Hartwig, Michael Weigand and Georg Preschern. At their production locations in Freinberg (Austria), Žebrák (Czech Republic) and Budapest (Hungary), Schwarzmüller manufactured more than 8,800 commercial vehicles with 2,290 employees in 2017 and generated a revenue of 349 Million Euros.

Schwarzmüller Group operates among an international organisation in 19 countries in Central and Eastern Europe. Besides the three production facilities in Austria, The Czech Republic and Hungary, they have several distribution and service sites in twelve countries.

== History ==
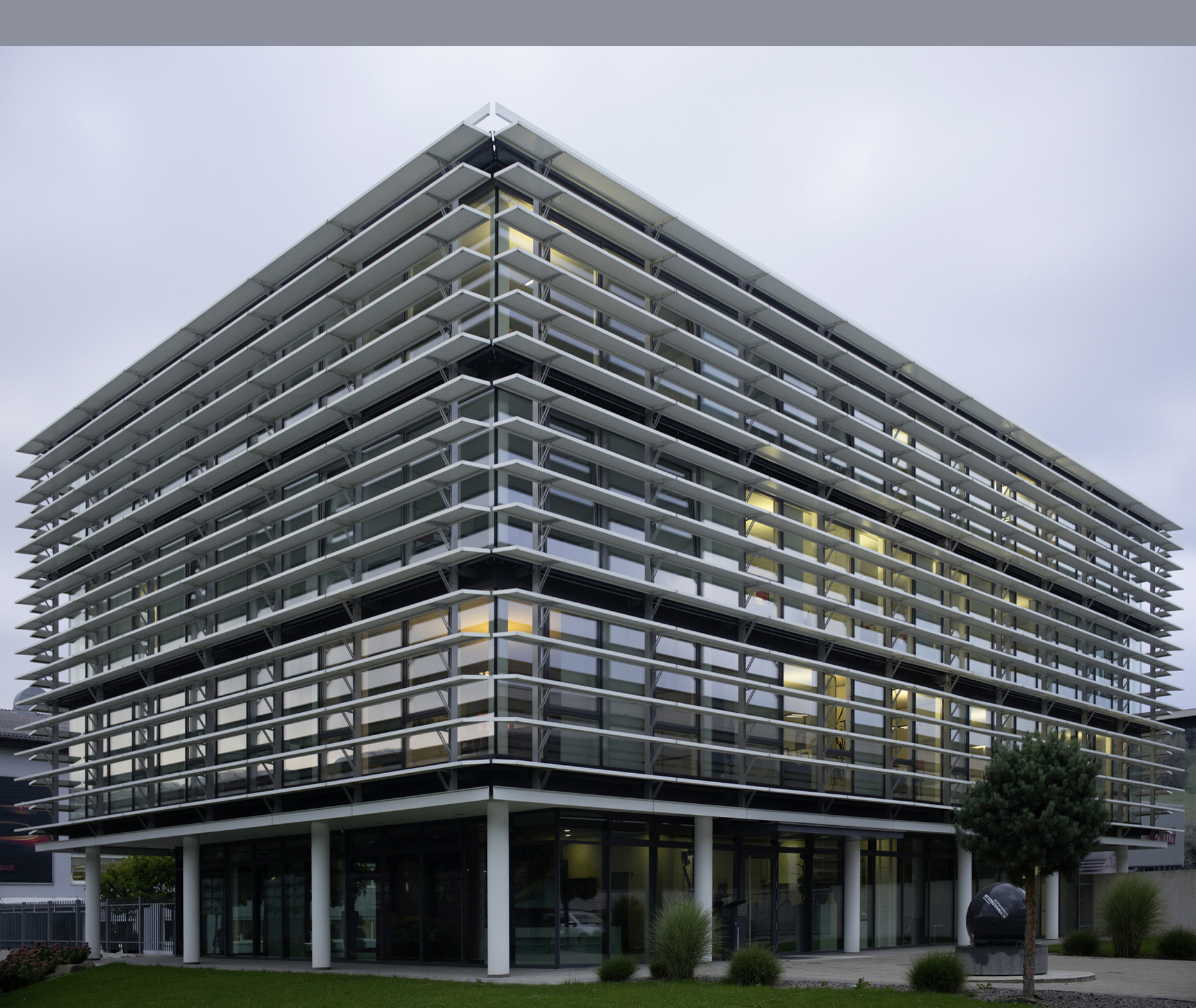
Company head office in Freinberg

=== Establishment and expansion ===
The company was founded in 1870 by Joseph Schwarzmüller as a Forge in Passau (Germany). In 1921 the first truck trailer with wooden-spoked wheels and completely rubber tyres was produced. In 1936 the company followed the relocation of business sites to Freinberg (Upper Austria), by Joseph Schwarzmüller junior. In 1958 the company comprised four service plants in Austria and one in Germany.

=== Expansion ===
With the opening of the production facility in Budapest (Hungary) in 1990 the expansion began. Three years later, the third production facility was opened in Žebrák (Czech Republic) and in 2009 a further production facility followed in Bucharest (Romania).

=== Strategic orientation ===
From 1966 the range of products was widened from flatbed trailers, tipper trailers and wood trailers to tanker trailers. In 2001 Schwarzmüller developed the trough-tipper vehicle in a lightweight design. This vehicle should combine weight optimisation with stability.

In 2009, at the company site in Freinberg, a completely automatic longitudinal girder assembly was added to the production facilities. In the same year Schwarzmüller produced the first moving floor trailer with a steel and aluminium frame. In 2012 the company released the newly developed ultralight flatbed trailer onto the market. In 2014 the thermally moulded tipper bed trailer, the Tele-Mega-Flatbed and the 3 Axle Double Wedge Tanker Trailer followed.

Since 2014, Schwarzmüller has been represented at the big trade shows, like the Bauma in Munich or the IAA in Hannover.

== Products ==
=== Product groups ===
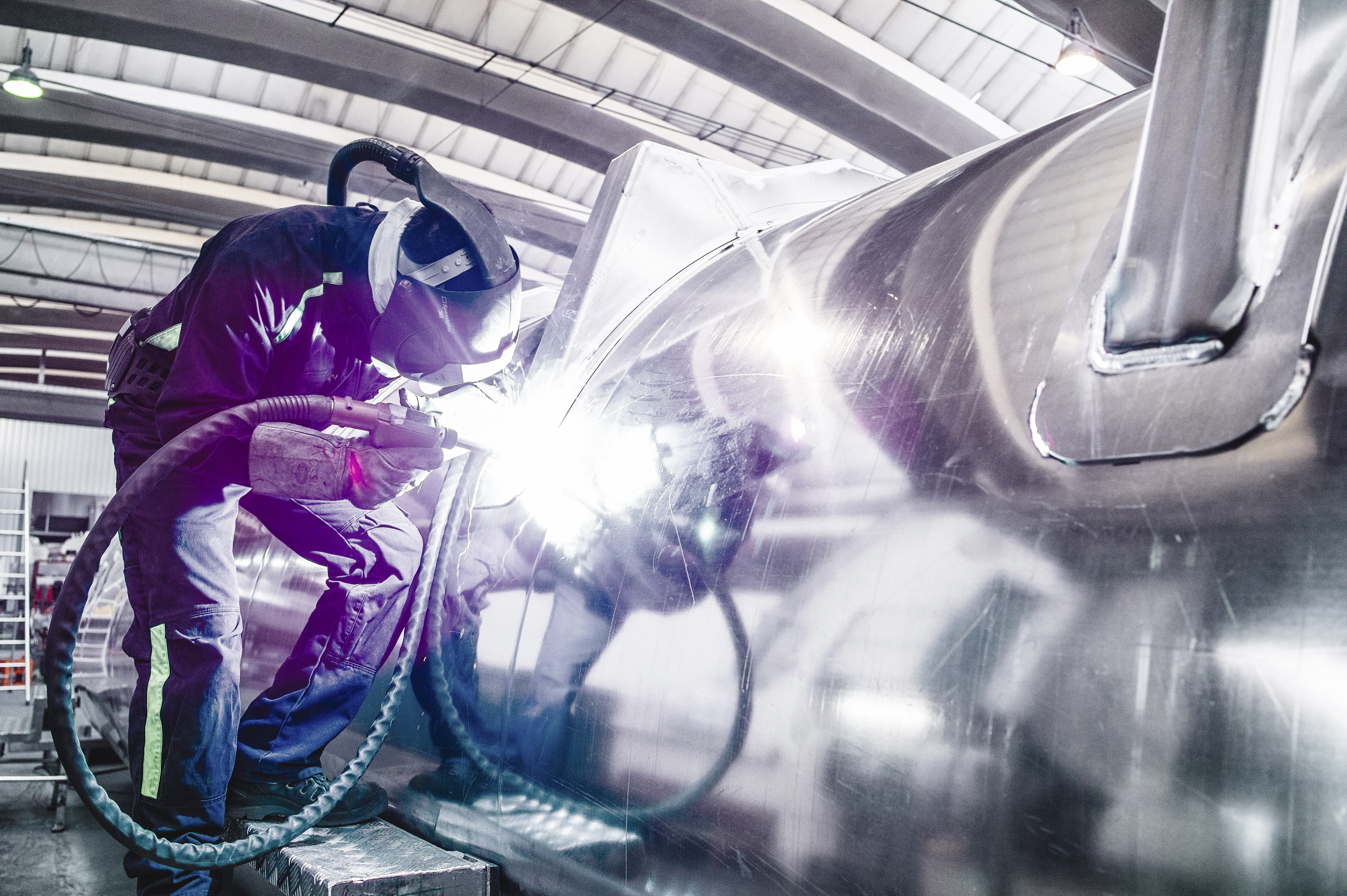
Welding of Cross Members on an Overturned Tank, Aluminium (2014)

Schwarzmüller offers eight product groups:

- Curtainsiders
- Tipper Trailers
- Wood Trailers
- Moving Floor Trailers
- Low-Loader Trailers
- Tanker Trailers
- Trailer Chassis
- Refrigerated Trailers

Sectors which employ Schwarzmüller trailers are the long distance trucking industry, the Waste Disposal industry, the Construction Industry, the Mineral Oil industry, the Food industry and Timber Industry.

== Gallery ==
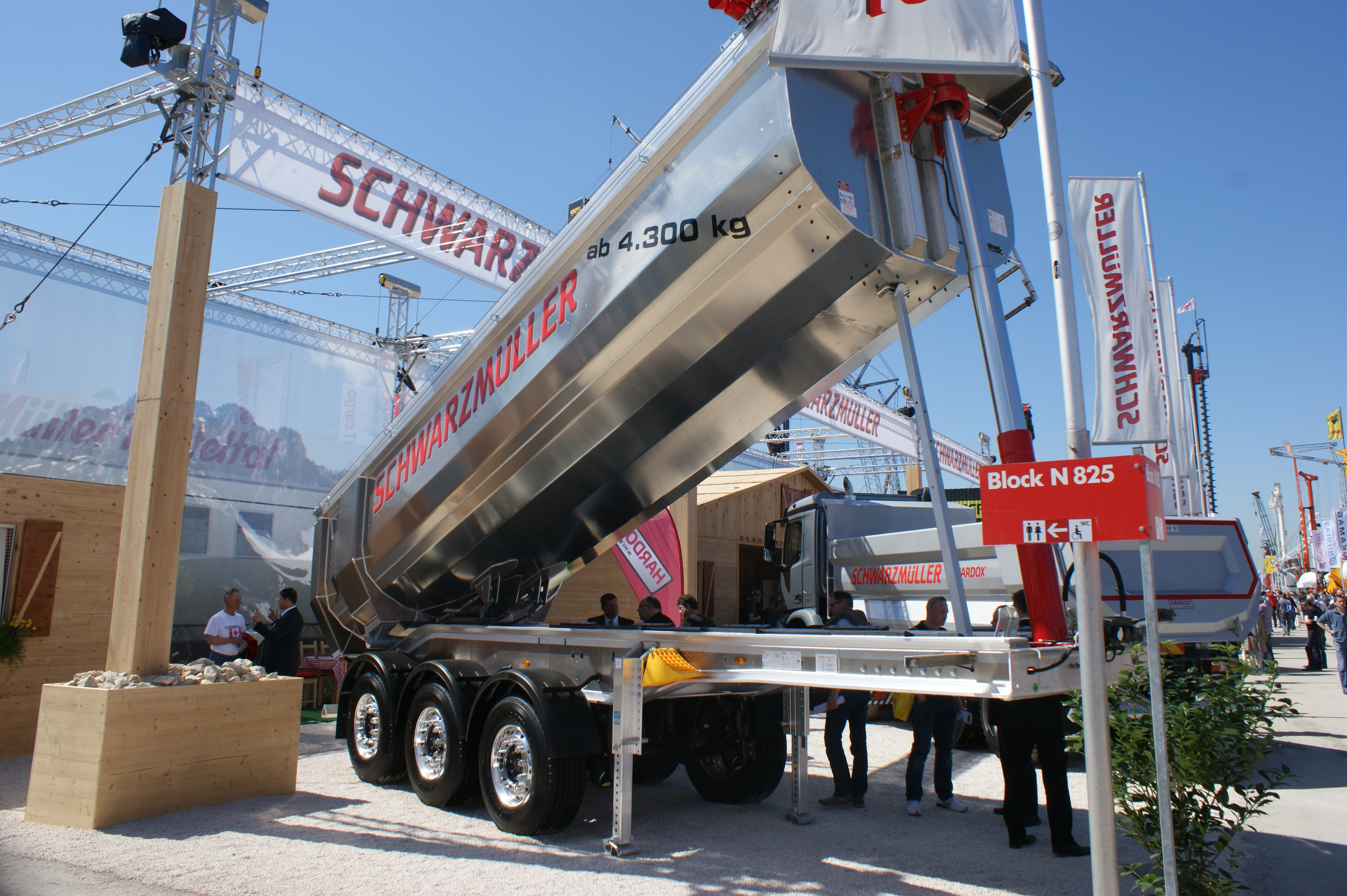
3 Axle Fully Aluminium Trough Tipper Trailer

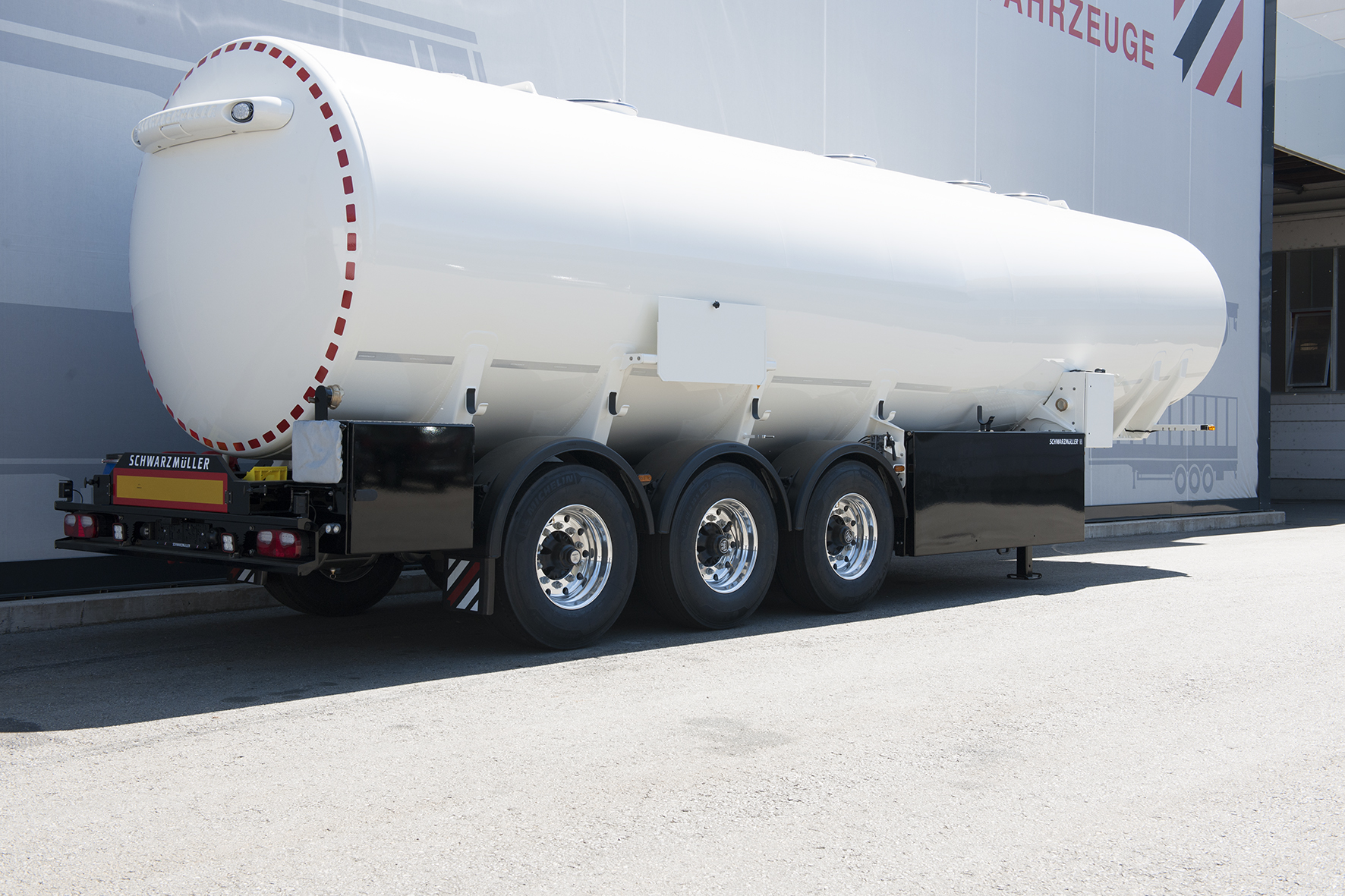
3 Axle Aluminium Tanker Trailer, Cylindrical

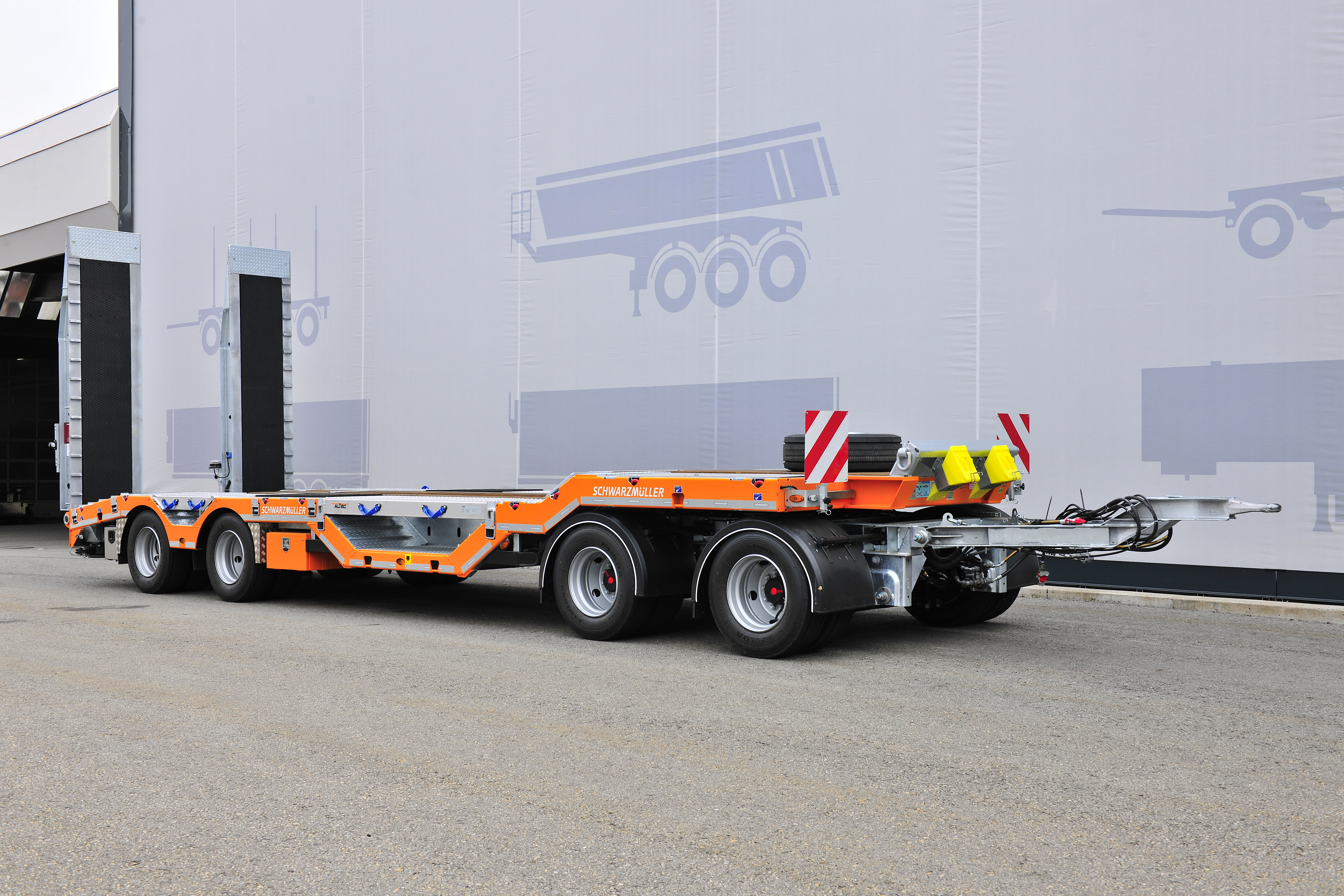
4 Axle Low-Loader Trailer

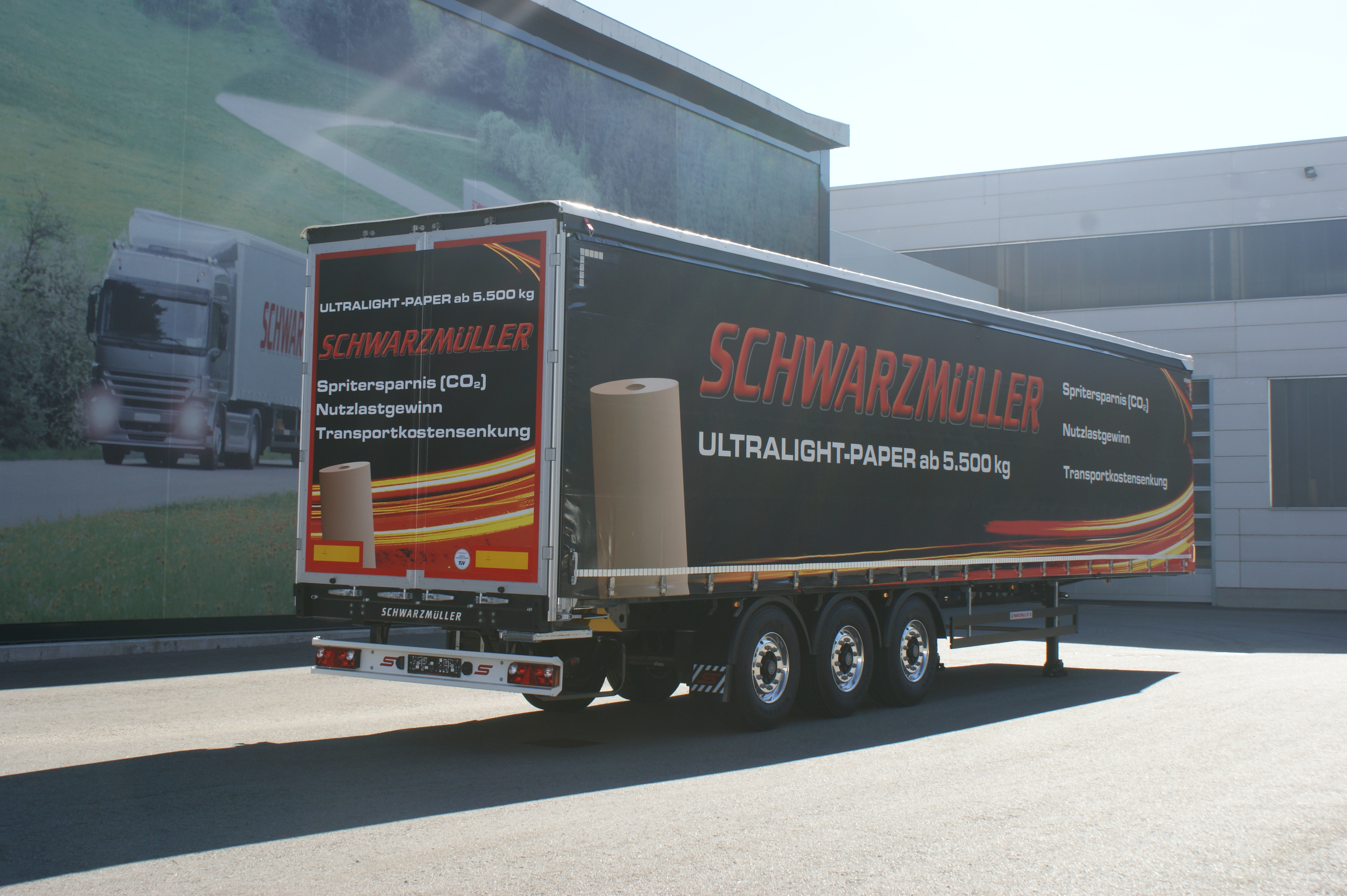
3 Axle Moving Floor Trailer with Joloda Equipment
