= Construction Simulator =

2015 simulation video game

Construction Simulator 2015
- Developer: weltenbauer. Software Entwicklung
- Publisher: Astragon
- Engine: Unity
- Platform: Microsoft Windows
- Release: 2015
- Genre: Simulation
- Modes: Single-player, multiplayer

Construction Simulator 2015 (Bau-Simulator in the original German title) is a Windows game released in 2015 by German company Astragon, which specializes in simulation software.

== Gameplay ==
Gameplay begins with tutorials where the player learns to drive the basic heavy machinery of the game, including trucks and excavators. As the game goes on, the player can select different contracts, to build several types of buildings, and manage their contractor company. The player can purchase new vehicles and equipment (from different brands including Caterpillar, Liebherr, John Deere and many more), and even hire new workers. The game features open world, and the player unlocks the locations as they discover them. Fast-travel is available in certain moments of the game and between missions.

== Reception ==
Construction Simulator received mixed reviews on Metacritic. IGN called it "beautifully detailed and incredibly fun".

== Sequels ==
Construction Simulator 2 was released in 2017 and new features include male and female playable characters, new contracts and buildings in Desert Springs, Sunny Hills, Westgate and Northridge in the U.S.

Construction Simulator 3 was released in 2019 and features contracts in Germany.

Construction Simulator was released in 2022 for PC stream, PlayStation 4, 5, Xbox One and Xbox Series S/X and featured contracts in U.S. and Europe.

Construction Simulator 4 was released in 2024 and featured contracts in Canada.

Construction Simulator: Evolution is upcoming in 2026.
