= Farming Simulator =

Series of farming simulation video games

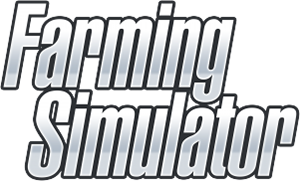
- Genre: Simulation
- Developer: GIANTS Software (2008–present)
- Publishers: Astragon (2008–2021); Excalibur Publishing (2008–2012); Focus Home Interactive (2013–2020); GIANTS Software (2021–present)
- Platforms: iOS, iPadOS, Android, Kindle Fire, Microsoft Windows, Mac OS, PlayStation 3, PlayStation Vita, Xbox 360, Nintendo 3DS, PlayStation 4, Xbox One, Nintendo Switch, PlayStation 5, Xbox Series X/S, Nintendo Switch 2, Commodore 64, Stadia, Sega Genesis/Mega Drive
- First release: Farmer-Simulator 2008; April 14, 2008; 18 years ago
- Latest release: Farming Simulator 26; May 19, 2026; 5 months ago

Farming Simulator is a simulation video game series about industrial agriculture, developed by GIANTS Software. The farm locations in the games are based on American, European and Asian environments. Players are able to farm, breed livestock, grow crops, and sell assets created from farming.

The games have sold over 25 million copies combined, as well as had 90 million mobile downloads. The game was originally revised, expanded, and re-released every two years, (excluding their newest two releases) with better graphics, a larger array of vehicles, and more interesting tasks for the user to perform.

== Gameplay ==
In career mode, players take on the roles of farmers. Their tasks depend on expanding and upgrading dated equipment and machinery, which can be achieved by harvesting and selling crops. Players are free to explore the surrounding areas of the map, grow from their choice of several crops, and invest their money in additional fields and equipment. They can also raise livestock or earn an income from forestry.

There are dynamically generated missions that consist of the player performing various tasks within a time frame such as mowing grass, fertilizing fields, or delivering cargo. The player is rewarded with money once the task is finished, plus a bonus based on how quickly the task was completed (excluding Farming Simulator 19,22).

Farming Simulator 14 is the first mobile Farming Simulator to have multiplayer mode. Farming Simulator 16 has Bluetooth functionality. Current generation consoles have multiplayer (Farming Simulator on the last generation consoles was the first console port of the game, with all features of 2013 Titanium). Farming Simulator 15 for PlayStation 4 and Xbox One also has a multiplayer mode.

== Games ==
=== PC and console ===
==== Farmer-Simulator 2008 ====
Farmer-Simulator 2008 was released on April 14, 2008, and was the first official release of the Farming Simulator game series. The game is the only game in the series known as Farmer-Simulator outside of German-speaking countries.

==== Farming-Simulator 2009 ====
Farming-Simulator 2009 is the second game in the series. It had a lot of new features such as new crop types (corn, rapeseed/canola, and barley), modding support and much more machinery, while having the same map as 2008, but remastered.

==== Farming Simulator 2011 ====
This is the third game in the series, and first to feature a multiplayer mode. It was greatly expanded with the introduction of a new map. Machinery from Deutz-Fahr, Pöttinger, and Horsch were added (also featured in the FS 2009 Gold edition). Cows were also an addition to this title.

==== Farming Simulator 2013 ====
The initial release for Farming Simulator 2013 was on October 26, 2012. A version was released for the PlayStation Vita, PlayStation 3, and Xbox 360 in 2013, known as Farming Simulator. Almost a year after its PC release, it received a large update and re-release under the title Farming Simulator 2013 Titanium Edition, on October 10, 2013. It contains all of the previous assets from the first iteration, with new content of a US-based environment in the form of a map called "Westbridge Hills" and new vehicles. New content was also released as DLC add-ons for those with the original version of the game.

==== Farming Simulator 15 ====
Farming Simulator 15 was released to Windows and Mac OS on October 30, 2014. This version introduced forestry, washable vehicles, and 41 brands. Around 140 pieces of equipment are in the base game, 160 in the gold edition DLC pack. Farming Simulator 15 was released to consoles on May 19, 2015.

==== Farming Simulator 17 ====
Farming Simulator 17 was released on October 25, 2016. It features the return of Fendt since its last debut in Farming Simulator 2009, and also Massey Ferguson, Challenger, and Valtra. For the first time in the base game, soybeans, sunflowers, and oilseed radishes are introduced as growable crops. In previous games, the player would have had to download a modification to add these crops. The crop growing mechanics have been altered, to allow different ways to increase crop yield. These include fertilizing the fields multiple times throughout the growth stages, plowing the field after a set amount of harvests, de-weeding crops, or using oilseed radish as a cover crop. The missions system were also updated, allowing the player to do work for other in-game farmers. Other additions include drivable trains and an in-game radio. On November 14, 2017, a new expansion pack was released for all platforms. This added a new map, the growth of sugarcane and new vehicles and tools. This was called the platinum expansion pack and is free with the season pass which is also available for all platforms.

==== Farming Simulator Nintendo Switch Edition ====
Farming Simulator Nintendo Switch Edition was released on November 7, 2017. It is a port of Farming Simulator 17 with the same maps, vehicles, etc. No DLC has been released for this title.

==== Farming Simulator 19 ====
Farming Simulator 19 was released on November 20, 2018. Some key new features include a redesigned graphics engine and the addition of horse farming as well as oat and cotton crops. The game also features John Deere machinery for the first time, as well as Komatsu, Rau, Wilson trailer, and more. Farming Simulator 19 also has a Platinum Expansion containing 37 pieces of Claas machinery (or 41 if pre-ordered). The 6th DLC is the Kverneland & Vicon DLC, which contains 20 pieces of equipment from Kverneland, and Vicon, such as the FastBale; a non-stop round baler wrapper. A seventh DLC, Alpine Farming was released on November 12, 2020. It features a new map, dubbed 'Erlengrat' as well as new licensed machinery, including AEBI and Rigitrac, as well as the return of Bührer. Farming Simulator 19: Ambassador Edition, which includes the base game, along with its two expansions and six DLC, was announced is due to release on PC, PlayStation 4 and Xbox One on June 21, 2022.

==== Farming Simulator C64 Edition ====
Released alongside Farming Simulator 19 as a Collector's Edition bonus for the PC version.

==== Farming Simulator 22 ====
Farming Simulator 22 was released on November 22, 2021. It features a seasonal cycle, gear shifting, production chains for harvested crops and livestock products, new crops in the form of grapes, olives, and sorghum, and over 400 vehicles and implements. Also new is compatibility with DirectX 12, parallax occlusion mapping, occlusion culling, texture streaming and temporal anti-aliasing. On November 15, 2022, the Platinum Expansion was released. It includes a new forestry-themed map "Silverrun Forest" as well as 40 new machines (mainly Volvo BM branded), most of which are for forestry use. Also introduced are tree marking and new log transport methods including containers, winches, and yarders. A second major expansion was released on November 14, 2023. It includes a new Central European map named 'Zielonka', and new crops that are: carrots, parsnips, and red beet. The expansion also includes new factories and production chains, over 35 new and specialized machines that contain 15 brands, 4 of which are new to the series: Dewulf, Gorenc, Agrio & WIFO.

==== Farming Simulator 25 ====
Farming Simulator 25 was released on November 12, 2024. It features the new Giants Engine 10 which features better weather effects and shadow rendering. Also newly featured is water buffalo farming as well as new crops in the form of rice, spinach, and over 400 vehicles and implements. For the first time, an Asian-themed map shipped out of the box in addition to the typical USA and European maps.

==== Farming Simulator 16 Bit Edition ====
Released alongside the Farming Simulator 25 Limited Edition and Deluxe Edition of the PC version and as a special edition limited release green Sega Genesis/Mega Drive cartridge.

==== Farming Simulator: Signature Edition ====
Released for Nintendo Switch 2 on December 9, 2025. Based on Farming Simulator 25, although it excludes online multiplayer, DLC content, and other features seen in Farming Simulator 25.

=== Mobile ===
==== Farming Simulator 2012 ====
Farming Simulator 2012 was released for the Nintendo 3DS, iOS, and Android in 2012. The 3DS version also supported 3D graphics.

==== Farming Simulator 14 ====
Farming Simulator 14 was released for iOS, Android, Nintendo 3DS, Windows Phone and PlayStation Vita on November 18, 2013, and gives a more polished and more casual gaming experience on mobile platforms than its predecessors. There are 10-20 brands in the game.

==== Farming Simulator 16 ====
Farming Simulator 16 was released for iOS, Android, Windows Phone, and PlayStation Vita on May 8, 2015. Interestingly, the game was updated in November 2023 to include a John Deere 7230 R tractor, despite the brand not being in the franchise until 2018's Farming Simulator 19.

==== Farming Simulator 18 ====
The game was announced for release on the Nintendo 3DS, iOS, Android, and PlayStation Vita. It was released on June 6, 2017. The game has a total of 28 drivable vehicles, and 48 pieces of equipment. This game features a map representing the American desert/grasslands.

==== Farming Simulator 20 ====
The game was released for Nintendo Switch, iOS and Android on December 3, 2019. The game features a total of 25 driveable vehicles and 91 pieces of equipment. While it does feature more drivable vehicles and equipment, it lacks many features like lumber, and frontloaders. Unlike recent versions, Farming Simulator 20 includes new features such as varied terrain, vehicle suspension, first person, the ability to walk around, several new profitable crops livestock, an updated economy, and a brand new rendering engine resembling that of Farming Simulator 19.

==== Farming Simulator 23 ====
Farming Simulator 23 was released for iOS/Android and Nintendo Switch on May 23, 2023. The game features 100 pieces of equipment, 130 on Nintendo Switch. Like Farming Simulator 22, it sees the introduction of weeding, production chains, and new crops: grapes, olives, and sorghum. It is also the first mobile version to feature chickens.

==== Farming Simulator 26 ====
Farming Simulator 26 was released for iOS/Android and Nintendo Switch on May 19, 2026.

=== Release history ===
There are nine main series titles with five mobile titles, including the 2017 Nintendo Switch standalone edition. There are also two "bonus titles" for retro systems.

Name	Release date	Platforms	Animal species	Standard Maps	DLC Maps
Farming Simulator 2008	April 14, 2008	Microsoft Windows	None	Giants Island	None
Farming Simulator 2009	March 30, 2009	Microsoft Windows	None	Giants Island	None
Farming Simulator 2011	October 29, 2010	Microsoft Windows, Mac OS X	Cows	?	None
Farming Simulator 2012	March 30, 2012	Android, iOS, Nintendo 3DS	None	?	None
Farming Simulator 2013	October 25, 2012	Microsoft Windows, Mac OS X, PlayStation 3, Xbox 360	Cows, Sheep, Chickens	Hagenstedt (Germany)	Westbridge Hills (United States)
Farming Simulator 14	November 28, 2013	Android, iOS, Windows Phone, Nintendo 3DS, Kindle Fire, PS Vita, ChromeOS	Cows	?	None
Farming Simulator 15	PC: October 30, 2014, Consoles: May 19, 2015	Microsoft Windows, macOS, PS4, PS3, Xbox 360, Xbox One X/S	Cows, Sheep, Chickens	Bjornholm (Sweden), Westbridge Hills (United States)	Sosnovka (Russia)
Farming Simulator 16	May 8, 2015	Android, iOS, Windows Phone, Fire OS, PS Vita, Microsoft Windows	Cows, Sheep	?	None
Farming Simulator 17	October 25, 2016	Microsoft Windows, macOS, PS4, Xbox One	Cows, Sheep, Chickens, Pigs	Goldcrest Valley (United States), Sosnovka (Russia)	Estancia Lapacho (South America) (Note: Unspecified Country)
Farming Simulator 18	June 6, 2017	Android, iOS, Nintendo 3DS, PS Vita	Cows, Sheep, Pigs	?	None
Farming Simulator Nintendo Switch (Farming Simulator 17)	November 7, 2017	Nintendo Switch	Cows, Sheep, Chickens, Pigs	Goldcrest Valley (United States), Sosnovka (Russia)	None
Farming Simulator 19	November 20, 2018	Microsoft Windows, MacOS, PS4, Xbox One	Cows, Sheep, Chickens, Pigs, Horses, Dogs	Ravenport (United States), Felsbrunn (Germany)	Erlengrat (Switzerland)
Farming Simulator C64 Edition	2018	Commodore 64	None	?	None
Farming Simulator 20	December 3, 2019	Android, iOS, Nintendo Switch	Cows, Sheep, Pigs, Horses	Blue Lake Valley (United States)	None
Farming Simulator 22	November 22, 2021	Microsoft Windows, MacOS, PS4, PS5, Xbox One, Xbox Series X/S,	Cows, Sheep, Chickens, Pigs, Horses, Dogs, Bees	Elmcreek (United States), Erlengrat (Switzerland), Haut-Beyleron (France)	Silverrun Forest (United States), Zielonka (Poland), Horsch AgroVation (Czech Republic)
Farming Simulator 23	May 23, 2023	Android, iOS, Nintendo Switch	Cows, Sheep, Chickens, Pigs, Horses	Amberstone (United States), Neubrunn (Germany)	None
Farming Simulator 25	November 12, 2024	Microsoft Windows, MacOS, PS5, Xbox Series X/S	Cows, Sheep, Chickens, Pigs, Horses, Dogs, Bees, Buffalo, Goats	Riverbend Springs (Arkansas, United States), Hutan Pantai (Asia) (Note: Unspecified country, but bears similarities to South Korea), Zielonka (Poland)	Kinlaig (Scotland, United Kingdom)
Farming Simulator 16 Bit Edition	May 14, 2025	Sega Mega Drive	None	?	None
Farming Simulator: Signature Edition	December 9, 2025	Nintendo Switch 2	Cows, Sheep, Chickens, Pigs, Horses, Dogs, Bees, Buffalo, Goats	Riverbend Springs (Arkansas, United States), Hutan Pantai (Asia) (Note: Unspecified country, but bears similarities to South Korea), Zielonka (Poland)	None
Farming Simulator 26	May 19, 2026	Android, iOS, Nintendo Switch	Cows, Sheep, Chickens, Goats	Dawnridge, Harbruck	None

== Esports ==
GIANTS Software established an Esports league in 2019. There exist about a dozen teams, many who are sponsored by farming equipment companies. Instead of running a farm like the objective in the game series, the competitions are a 3v3 match to obtain the highest score of hay bales dropped off within a given time limit.

== Reception ==
Reception of the Farming Simulator series has been mixed across all titles, with critics praising its sense of relaxation and array of realistic machinery and vehicles. Some have criticised the games for their repetition and lack of interesting mechanics, while others argue such qualities should be expected in a simulator. Though the series targets the audience that are knowledgeable in the farming industry, the series is generally liked by both farmers and non-farmers alike.
