= Vehicle simulation game =

Video game genre

Vehicle simulation games are a genre of video games which attempt to provide the player with a realistic interpretation of operating various kinds of vehicles. This includes automobiles, aircraft, watercraft, spacecraft, military vehicles, and a variety of other vehicles. The main challenge is to master driving and steering the vehicle from the perspective of the pilot or driver, with most games adding another challenge such as racing or fighting rival vehicles. Games are often divided based on realism, with some games including more realistic physics and challenges such as fuel management.

== Definition ==
Vehicle simulation games allow players to drive or fly a vehicle. This vehicle can resemble a real one, or a vehicle from the game designer's imagination. This includes vehicles in the air, on the ground, over water, or even in space. Different vehicle simulations can involve a variety of goals, including racing, combat, or simply the experience of driving a vehicle. These games normally allow the player to experience action from the visual perspective of the pilot or driver. This definition includes a wide range of vehicles, including aircraft, spacecraft, boats, cars, trucks, motorcycles, and so on.

This definition includes many kinds of driving simulators, including both real and imaginary racing systems. It also includes a range of flight simulators, including civilian, military, and fantastical vehicles. Rolling and Adams note that racing games follow the design conventions of a vehicle simulation, despite often being marketed in the sports category.

== Game design ==
=== Goals and challenges ===
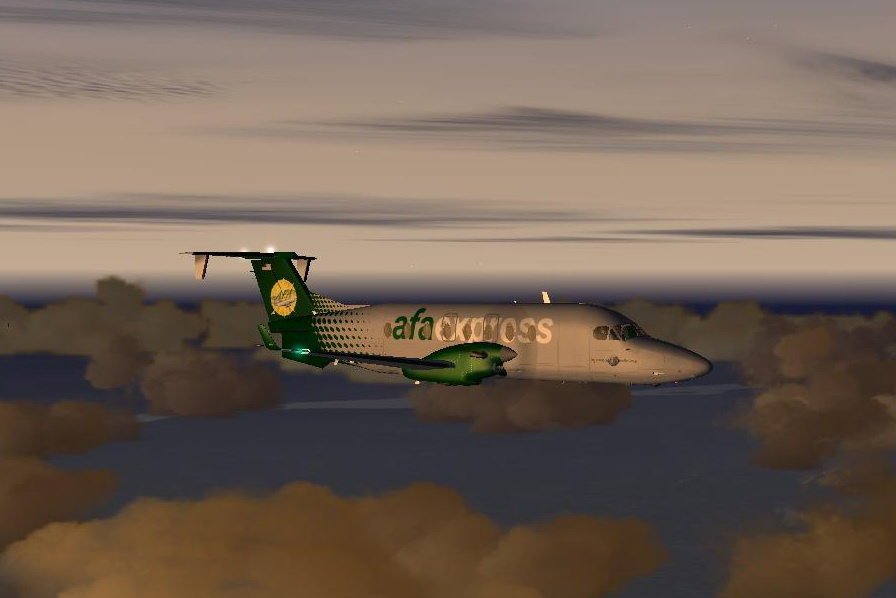
Microsoft Flight Simulator focuses solely on the experience of flying an aircraft, in contrast to other games with missions and goals.

The core gameplay in a vehicle simulation is the physical and tactical challenge of driving a vehicle. Mastery of vehicle control is the element which encourages players to continue playing, even after the game's goals have been completed. Players learn to use appropriate speed and steering, and must avoid crashing by observing cues about how fast they are going. There are some vehicle simulations where the player is given no specific goal, and is simply able to explore and experience using the vehicle. In the absence of any competition, "some vehicle simulations aren't games at all"

But most vehicle simulations involve some form of competition or race, with a clear winner and loser. Some games add special challenges such as combat and slaloms. Many types of driving games, including both military flight simulators and racing simulators, make use of careers and campaigns. Players must complete different tracks or missions, and collect victories and other achievements based on their performance.

=== Realism and physics ===
The market for vehicle simulators is "divided between the purists and the casual players". A variety of vehicle simulators have been created to serve both markets. Purists demand total accuracy, whereas casual players are less concerned with such details. This level of accuracy depends on how damage, physics, environment, weather, and controls are implemented. For example, accurate flight simulators will ensure that the vehicle responds slowly to their controls, while other games will treat the plane more like a car in order to simplify the game.

In both driving games and flight simulators, players have come to expect a high degree of verisimilitude where vehicles are scaled to realistic sizes. These types of games usually utilize a highly accurate time scale, although several flight simulators allow players to fast forward through periods where there is nothing interesting happening. In the case of space or water vehicle simulations, the gameplay physics tend to follow those of flying and driving simulations.

These games will add variety by having a variety of vehicles with different performance characteristics, such as sharper turning or faster speed. Many games make use of real life vehicles, including military vehicles or cars from major automobile manufacturers.

In most games, the player can adjust performance of their vehicle by configuring or replacing parts of it, while some games like SimplePlanes allow players to build entirely custom vehicles from a set of blocks and presets. These may sacrifice realism in favor of broader customization possibilities.

=== Non-driving roles ===
Although vehicle simulations focus on driving a vehicle, many games involve non-driving roles. For more detailed racing simulations, the player may sometimes play the role of a mechanic who repairs or augments their vehicle. Some flight simulators involve various air traffic controller roles, especially in multiplayer mode. In games with a combat element, this might involve manning a separate combat station on a larger vehicle. Some games such as Their Finest Hour allow players to alternate between piloting the vehicle or manning the waist or tail guns. Megafortress allowed players to operate five separate stations for combat and managing the vehicle. Games that make use of combat have competition modes similar to first-person shooters, where player must defeat human or artificial intelligence opponents.

=== As part of other genres ===
Many games implement a driving system. For example, it has been increasingly popular in first-person shooters to have combat vehicles. These are rarely designed with accuracy in mind, focusing more on their tactical experience.

== Sub-genres and vehicle types ==
Rollings and Adams note that "the vast majority of vehicle simulators are flight simulators and driving (usually car-racing) simulators". However, this genre includes any game that creates the feeling of driving or flying a vehicle, including the magic broomsticks in the Harry Potter games. More common examples include simulations of driving trains, spacecraft, boats, tanks, and other combat vehicles.

=== Boat and naval simulations ===
Most watercraft simulations are of "powerboats or jet skis". Gameplay differs from driving a car because of the fluid medium, which affects turning. These games involve racing through a course marked by buoys, with some tracks allowing the player to make jumps. Sailing simulations are rare, as the complexity of controlling a sailboat appeals to only a specialized market. However, there has been a growing market after Nadeo introduced their Virtual Skipper games. Other popular sailing games are Sail Simulator 2010 and Virtual Sailor. These games can both be played online against other sailors around the world.

This category includes submarine simulations, which typically focus on old-fashioned submarine activities such as firing torpedoes at surface ships. Simulations of warships are more rare. Due to their slow speed, games such as Harpoon, Command: Modern Air Naval Operations and Dangerous Waters simulate naval warfare involving entire fleets.

=== Construction simulators ===
Construction simulators such as the Construction Simulator series put players in control of various vehicles on construction sites or in other scenarios allowing them to simulate the vehicles and the tasks they accomplish. Vehicles used in construction simulator games consist of a wide variety of vehicles such as cranes, dozers, excavators, front loaders and various trucks. Players can use these vehicles to build up construction projects, demolish buildings or deform terrain such as digging pits and trenches. Construction vehicle sims have become increasingly popular on mobile platforms with numerous games focused on individual vehicles such as Heavy Excavator Simulator PRO and Construction & Crane SIM.

=== Farming simulators ===
Farm simulators such as Farming Simulator series offer varying levels of farm care from agriculture production to animal husbandry and synthesis of bio-fuels. Vehicles used in farming simulator games consist mainly of tractors, combines, and tractor trailers. Because of the nature of farming there are often many different components to add to the tractor to till, seed, water, and fertilize the land.

=== Flight simulators ===
Flight simulators "tend to fall into military or civilian categories".

- Civilian flight simulator: FlightGear and Microsoft Flight Simulator are notable example of a civilian flight simulator. These games "seldom have any victory conditions, unless they implement racing or specific challenges, such as tests of speed and accuracy". Still, players can be presented with a variety of challenges including flying at night, or flying in harsh weather conditions. One of the most difficult challenges is to land the plane, especially during adverse weather conditions.
- Military flight simulators: Military or combat flight simulators demand that players "achieve the mission's objectives, usually attacking enemy aircraft and ground installations". These games depend heavily on the aircraft or role being simulated, where fighter planes largely engage with enemy aircraft, while bombers are designed to attack targets on the ground. A unique aspect of these games is the ability to view ground targets, or view the action from the perspective of a bomb or missile. Players are often confronted with a series of missions with both primary and secondary objectives, and victory is achieved by completing a combination of goals. Many games will also award different levels of victory based on how many objectives were completed, or how much time or damage the player took.
- Fantasy flight simulators: in some extraordinary instances, a game will create the experience of flying on fantastical vehicles, such as a dragon.

=== Racing games ===
Racing video games "tend to fall into organized racing and imaginary racing categories".

- Racing simulations: Organized racing simulators attempt to "reproduce the experience of driving a racing car or motorcycle in an existing racing class: Indycar, NASCAR, Formula 1, and so on." These games draw on real-life to design their gameplay, such as by treating fuel as a resource, or wearing out the car's brakes and tires. Damage is often modeled as a single variable, with more accurate simulations modeling damage to different areas of the car with differing consequences. Aside from trying to win races without crashing, players will sometimes earn prize money that they can spend on upgrading their race car.
- Arcade racing games: Less realistic racing games, sometimes called imaginary or arcade-like racing games, involve "imaginary situations, driving madly through cities or the countryside or even fantasy environments". These games focus less on realistic physics, and may add other challenges such as collecting power-ups, driving through hoops and cones, or shooting weapons at rival players.

=== Spacecraft simulators ===
In general, game developers tend to avoid making realistic space flight simulators because they behave too slowly to interest a wide audience. Thus, spacecraft simulation games are typically science fiction games, such as the Wing Commander series. Two notable counter-examples are Orbiter, and Kerbal Space Program, which have the explicit goal of physically accurate atmospheric- and spaceflight simulation.

=== Tank and mech simulators ===
Vehicular combat simulators include tank simulations and mecha simulations. Aside from piloting the vehicle, a key element of gameplay is controlling a rotating turret. These games are seldom fully accurate, as realistic tanks are slow and have limited visibility (as World War II Online simulation game), which would limit their appeal to casual gamers. Many games have made use of mechs in order to appeal to a wider audience, as they can add weapons and capabilities that are not necessarily restricted by weapons platforms and technologies that bear resemblance to such systems that currently exist, which grants a broader artistic license on behalf of the game developers.

=== Vehicular combat game ===
Vehicular combat games (also known as just vehicular combat or car combat) are typically video or computer games where the primary objectives of gameplay includes vehicles, armed with weapons fighting with other armed vehicles.

=== Train simulator ===
This genre also includes simulations of driving trains. A train simulator is a computer program that simulates rail transport operations. This includes other kinds of railborne vehicles, such as a tram.

=== Trucking simulator ===
The first trucking simulator Juggernaut was released in 1985. It simulates the road train (as an articulated vehicle) and focuses on cargo transportation and economical issues.

The trucking simulator is a relatively new aspect of the vehicle simulation genre, focusing on cargo transportation and the expansion of the player's trucking business, combining elements of a business simulation game.
