= Astragon =

German video game publisher

Astragon Entertainment GmbH
- Formerly: Astragon Software GmbH
- Company type: Subsidiary
- Industry: Video games
- Founded: 2000; 26 years ago
- Headquarters: Düsseldorf, Germany
- Products: Games for video game consoles and computer software
- Parent: Everplay Group
- Website: www.astragon.com

Astragon Entertainment GmbH is a German video game publisher based in Düsseldorf, Germany. Originally a subsidiary of the German video game distributor Astragon Sales & Services GmbH (formerly Rondomedia Marketing & Vertriebs GmbH), the company became known for being the original worldwide publisher of the Farming Simulator series and continues to publish it across the world.

== History ==
Astragon was originally headquartered in Hagen, but moved to Mönchengladbach in 2004. Astragon formerly specialised in publishing simulation games for Microsoft Windows, but in 2008 they moved into other areas, when they published more casual games like Wendy: Holidays at Rosenborg for the Nintendo DS.

They have released several English language games under their Just Play It! label, including Myst IV: Revelation and CSI: Dark Motives. Astragon publishes games by Big Fish Games and iWin in the German language market.

The company has publishing simulation games for a variety of platforms. Titles include the Construction Simulator series, the Bus Simulator series, the Farming Simulator series, and additional titles including commercial fishing simulation Fishing: Barents Sea, Firefighting Simulator, FPV drone racing simulation game Liftoff: Drone Racing, and Police Simulator: Patrol Officers.

In September 2015, Astragon became the 100th GAME member of the association of the German games industry called GAME – Bundesverband der deutschen Games-Branche e.V..

In 2019, the company moved to Düsseldorf. In July 2021, the Astragon Sales & Services merged with its subsidiary with the new company operating as astragon Entertainment. In January 2022, the company was acquired by the Team17 Group in a deal worth £83 million.

== Software ==
In addition to games, Astragon has published archiving software, educational CDs, multimedia tools and design programs.

=== PC and console games ===
- Farming Simulator series (Germany only)
- Bus Simulator series
- Construction Simulator series
- The Farm (2008)
- Disco Tycoon (2010)
- Dive to the Titanic (2010)
- Camping Manager 2012 (2012)
- Jack Keane 2 - The Fire Within (2013)
- Water Park Tycoon (2014)
- TransOcean: The Shipping Company (2014)
- Ropeway Simulator 2014 (2014)
- Mystery of Neuschwanstein (2015)
- Coast Guard (2015)
- CITYCONOMY: Service for your City (2015)
- Oil Enterprise (2016)
- TransOcean 2: Rivals (2016)
- Gravity Island (2016)
- Police Tactics: Imperio (2016)
- Industry Manager: Future Technologies (2016)
- Take Off - The Flight Simulator (2017)
- TransRoad: USA (2017)
- Fishing: Barents Sea (2018)
- Police Simulator: Patrol Duty (2019)
- Drone Swarm (2020)
- Firefighting Simulator - The Squad (2020)
- Railroads Online (2021)
- Police Simulator: Patrol Officers (2022)
- Firefighting Simulator - Ignite (2025)
