= List of video games released in 2024 =

The following is a comprehensive index of all games released in 2024, sorted chronologically by release date, and divided by quarter. Information regarding developer, publisher, operating system, genre and type of release is provided where available

For a summary of 2024 in video games as a whole, see 2024 in video games.

== Legend ==
Video game platforms
| ATRVCS | Atari VCS | DROID | Android | iOS | iOS, iPhone, iPod, iPadOS, iPad, visionOS, Apple Vision Pro |
| LIN | Linux, SteamOS | NES | Nintendo Entertainment System / Famicom | NS | Nintendo Switch |
| OSX | macOS | PS4 | PlayStation 4 | PS5 | PlayStation 5 |
| Quest | Meta Quest / Oculus Quest family, including Oculus Rift | WIN | Windows, all versions Windows 95 and up | XBO | Xbox One |
| XBX/S | Xbox Series X/S | | | | |

Types of releases
| Compilation | A compilation, anthology or collection of several titles, usually (but not always) belonging to the same series |
| Early access | A game launched in early access is unfinished and thus might contain bugs and glitches or have some of the content missing |
| Episodic | An episodic video game that is released in batches over a period of time |
| Expansion | A large-scale DLC to an already existing game that adds new story, areas and additions and/or changes to the game's mechanics |
| Full release | A full release of a game that launched in early access first |
| Limited | A special release (often called "Limited" or "Collector's Edition") with bonus collector's material. Often provided to people who pre-order a game |
| Port | The game first appeared on a different platform and a port was made. The game is like the original, with few or no differences |
| Remake | The game is an enhanced remake of an original, made using a new engine and/or assets and thus containing completely new sound, graphics and possibly changes to the story and/or gameplay |
| Remaster | The game is a remaster of an original, released on the same or different platform, with (usually minor) changes to graphics, sound and/or gameplay |
| Rerelease | The game was re-released on the same platform with no or only minor changes |

Video game genres
| Action | Action game | Action RPG | Action role-playing game | Action-adventure | Action-adventure game |
| Adventure | Adventure game | Battle royale | Battle royale game | Brawler | Beat 'em up |
| Bullet hell | Bullet hell | Business sim | Business simulation game | City builder | City-building game |
| CMS | Construction and management simulation | Dating sim | Dating sim | DCCG | Digital collectible card game |
| Deck building | Deck building game | Digital tabletop | Digital tabletop game | Dungeon crawl | Dungeon crawl |
| Farming | Farm life sim | Fighting | Fighting game | Fitness | Fitness game |
| FPS | First-person shooter | Hack and slash | Hack and slash | Hero shooter | Hero shooter |
| Horror | Horror game | Interactive film | Interactive film | Life sim | Life simulation game |
| Metroidvania | Metroidvania | MMO | Massively multiplayer online game | MOBA | Multiplayer online battle arena |
| Narrative adventure | Narrative adventure game | Party | Party video game | PCA | Point-and-click adventure |
| Platformer | Platformer | Puzzle | Puzzle video game | Puzzle-platformer | Puzzle-platformer |
| Racing | Racing video game | Rhythm | Rhythm game | Roguelike | Roguelike, Roguelite |
| RPG | Role-playing video game | RTS | Real-time strategy | RTT | Real-time tactics |
| Sandbox | Sandbox game | Scrolling shooter | Scrolling shooter | Shoot 'em up | Shoot 'em up |
| Simulation | Simulation video game | Social sim | Social simulation game | Soulslike | Soulslike |
| Sports | Sports video game | Stealth | Stealth game | Strategy | Strategy video game |
| Survival | Survival game | Survival horror | Survival horror | Tactical RPG | Tactical role-playing game |
| Tactical shooter | Tactical shooter | TBS | Turn-based strategy | TBT | Turn-based tactics |
| Tower defense | Tower defense | TPS | Third-person shooter | Vehicle sim | Vehicle simulation game |
| Vehicular combat | Vehicular combat game | Visual novel | Visual novel | Walking sim | Walking simulator |

== List ==
=== January–March ===
| Release date | Title | Platform(s) | Type | Genre(s) | Developer(s) | Publisher(s) | Ref. |
|---|---|---|---|---|---|---|---|
| January 9 | KinitoPET | WIN | | Horror | troy_en | | |
| January 11 | Momodora: Moonlit Farewell | WIN | | Metroidvania | Bombservice | Playism | |
| January 11 | War Hospital | WIN, PS5, XBX/S | | RTS | Brave Lamb Studio | Nacon | |
| January 12 | Crystal Story: Dawn of Dusk | WIN | | Action RPG | Bred Frown | | |
| January 12 | Gungrave G.O.R.E Ultimate Enhanced Edition (JP) | NS | | TPS | Studio IGGYMOB | Beep Japan | |
| January 15 | Sovereign Syndicate | WIN | | RPG | Crimson Herring Studios | | |
| January 16 | Home Safety Hotline | WIN | | Simulation, Horror | Night Signal Entertainment | | |
| January 17 | Golden Sun | NS | Port | RPG | Camelot Software Planning | Nintendo | |
| January 17 | Golden Sun: The Lost Age | NS | Port | RPG | Camelot Software Planning | Nintendo | |
| January 17 | Immortal Life | WIN | | Life sim | YiFang Studio | 2P Games | |
| January 18 | Bahnsen Knights | NS, PS4, PS5, XBO, XBX/S | | Adventure | LCB Game Studio | Chorus Worldwide | |
| January 18 | DreadOut 2 | NS | | Survival horror | Digital Happiness | | |
| January 18 | No Case Should Remain Unsolved | WIN, OSX | | Adventure, puzzle | Somi | | |
| January 18 | The Pedestrian | NS | | Puzzle-platformer | Skookum Arts | | |
| January 18 | Prince of Persia: The Lost Crown | WIN, NS, PS4, PS5, XBO, XBX/S | Original | Action-adventure, Platformer | Ubisoft Montpellier | Ubisoft | |
| January 18 | Turnip Boy Robs a Bank | WIN, NS, XBO | | Action-adventure | Snoozy Kazoo | Graffiti Games | |
| January 18 | Yuuna and the Haunted Hot Springs: The Thrilling Steamy Maze Kiwami | WIN, iOS, DROID, NS, PS5 | | RPG | Matrix Software | FuRyu | |
| January 19 | Another Code: Recollection | NS | | PCA | Arc System Works | Nintendo | |
| January 19 | The Cub | WIN, NS, PS4, PS5 | | Platformer | Demagog Studio | Untold Tales | |
| January 19 | The Last of Us Part II Remastered | PS5 | Remaster | Action-adventure, Survival horror | Naughty Dog | Sony Interactive Entertainment | |
| January 22 | Touhou Shoujo: Tale of Beautiful Memories | PS4 | | Action RPG | The N Main Shop | Mediascape | |
| January 22 | The Universim | WIN, OSX, LIN | Full release | God game, Simulation | Crytivo | | |
| January 23 | Graven | WIN | | FPS | Slipgate Ironworks | 3D Realms, Fulqrum Publishing | |
| January 23 | Howl | PS5, XBX/S | | TBS | Mi'pu'mi Games | Astragon Entertainment | |
| January 23 | Lil' Guardsman | WIN, OSX, NS, PS5, XBX/S | | Puzzle | Hilltop Studios | Versus Evil, TinyBuild | |
| January 23 | Neptunia: Sisters vs. Sisters | NS | | RPG | Compile Heart | Idea Factory | |
| January 23 | Stargate: Timekeepers | WIN | | RTT, Stealth | Slitherine Poland | Slitherine Software | |
| January 23 | Stumble Guys | XBO, XBX/S | | Party, Battle royale | Scopely | | |
| January 23 | Tasokare Hotel Re:newal (JP) | WIN | | Visual novel | SEEC | | |
| January 24 | Toribash Next | WIN, OSX | | Fighting | Nabi Studios | Nicalis | |
| January 25 | Apollo Justice: Ace Attorney Trilogy | WIN, NS, PS4, XBO | Compilation | Adventure, Visual novel | Capcom | | |
| January 25 | Docchi no i ga Suki Desu ka? (JP) | NS, PS4 | | Visual novel | Hooksoft | Entergram | |
| January 25 | Phantom Abyss | WIN, XBX/S | | Action-adventure | Team WIBY | Devolver Digital | |
| January 25 | Shiren the Wanderer: The Mystery Dungeon of Serpentcoil Island (JP) | NS | | Roguelike, RPG | Spike Chunsoft | | |
| January 25 | Touhou Luna Nights | PS4, PS5 | | Metroidvania, Action-adventure | Team Ladybug | Playism | |
| January 25 | Under Night In-Birth II [Sys:Celes] | WIN, NS, PS4, PS5 | | Fighting | French-Bread | Arc System Works | |
| January 26 | Like a Dragon: Infinite Wealth | WIN, PS4, PS5, XBO, XBX/S | Original | RPG | Ryu Ga Gotoku Studio | Sega | |
| January 26 | Tekken 8 | WIN, PS5, XBX/S | Original | Fighting | Bandai Namco Studios, Arika | Bandai Namco Entertainment | |
| January 29 | Celeste 64: Fragments of the Mountain | WIN, OSX, LIN | Original | Adventure, Platformer | Extremely OK Games | | |
| January 29 | Felvidek | WIN | | RPG | Jozef Pavelka, Vlado Ganaj | Tutto Passa | |
| January 30 | Rugby 24 | WIN, PS4, PS5, XBO, XBX/S | | Sports | Big Ant Studios | Nacon | |
| January 31 | BlazBlue Entropy Effect | WIN | | Action, Roguelike | 91Act | | |
| February 1 | Blackbox | iOS | | Puzzle | Ryan McLeod | | |
| February 1 | Granblue Fantasy: Relink | WIN, PS4, PS5 | | Action RPG | Cygames | | |
| February 1 | Jujutsu Kaisen: Cursed Clash (JP) | WIN, NS, PS4, PS5, XBO, XBX/S | | Fighting | Byking, Gemdrops | Bandai Namco Entertainment | |
| February 1 | The Legend of Legacy HD Remastered (JP) | WIN, NS, PS4, PS5 | Remaster | RPG | Cattle Call | FuRyu | |
| February 2 | Jujutsu Kaisen: Cursed Clash | WIN, NS, PS4, PS5, XBO, XBX/S | | Fighting | Byking, Gemdrops | Bandai Namco Entertainment | |
| February 2 | Moonbreaker | WIN | | TBS | Unknown Worlds | Krafton | |
| February 2 | Persona 3 Reload | WIN, PS4, PS5, XBO, XBX/S | Remake | RPG | P-Studio | JP: Atlus; WW: Sega | |
| February 2 | Suicide Squad: Kill the Justice League | WIN, PS5, XBX/S | Original | Action-adventure | Rocksteady Studios | Warner Bros. Games | |
| February 6 | Foamstars | PS4, PS5 | Original | TPS | Toylogic | Square Enix | |
| February 8 | Helldivers II | WIN, PS5 | Original | TPS | Arrowhead Game Studios | Sony Interactive Entertainment | |
| February 8 | The Inquisitor | WIN, PS5, XBX/S | | Action-adventure | The Dust | Kalypso Media | |
| February 8 | Invector: Rhythm Galaxy | NS, PS4, XBO | | Rhythm | Hello There Games | Warner Music Group | |
| February 8 | Touhou Danmaku Kagura: Phantasia Lost | WIN | | Rhythm | Unknown X | Alliance Arts | |
| February 13 | Banishers: Ghosts of New Eden | WIN, PS5, XBX/S | Original | Action RPG | Don't Nod | Focus Entertainment | |
| February 13 | Dragon Quest Builders | WIN | | Action RPG, Sandbox | Square Enix | | |
| February 13 | Islands of Insight | WIN | | Puzzle | Lunarch Studios | Behaviour Interactive | |
| February 13 | Lysfanga: The Time Shift Warrior | WIN | | Hack and slash | Sand Door Studio | Quantic Dream | |
| February 13 | Ultros | WIN, PS4, PS5 | | Action-adventure, Metroidvania | Hadoque | | |
| February 14 | Arzette: The Jewel of Faramore | WIN, NS, PS4, PS5, XBX/S | | Action-adventure, Platformer | Seedy Eye Software | Limited Run Games | |
| February 14 | Tokimeki Memorial Girl's Side: 1st Love (JP) | NS | | Dating sim | Konami | | |
| February 14 | Tokimeki Memorial Girl's Side: 2nd Kiss (JP) | NS | | Dating sim | Konami | | |
| February 14 | Tokimeki Memorial Girl's Side: 3rd Story (JP) | NS | | Dating sim | Konami | | |
| February 14 | Tomb Raider I–III Remastered | WIN, NS, PS4, PS5, XBO, XBX/S | Remaster, Compilation | Action-adventure | Aspyr | | |
| February 15 | Deathwish Enforcers | WIN | | Action | Monster Bath Games | Limited Run Games | |
| February 15 | Gunvolt Records Cychronicle | WIN, NS, PS4, PS5, XBO, XBX/S | | Rhythm | Inti Creates | | |
| February 15 | The Legend of Heroes: Trails Through Daybreak (JP) | NS | | RPG | Nihon Falcom | | |
| February 15 | PlateUp! | NS, PS4, PS5, XBO, XBX/S | | Simulation | It's Happening | Yogscast Games | |
| February 15 | Smalland: Survive the Wilds | WIN, PS5, XBX/S | Full release | Survival | Merge Games | Maximum Entertainment | |
| February 15 | Spirit Hunter: Death Mark II | WIN, NS, PS5 | | Horror, Visual novel | Experience | Aksys Games | |
| February 15 | The World According to Girl | NS, XBO, XBX/S | | Deck building (roguelike) | Yondray | Amata Games | |
| February 16 | The Legend of Heroes: Trails of Cold Steel III | PS5 | | RPG | Nihon Falcom | NIS America | |
| February 16 | The Legend of Heroes: Trails of Cold Steel IV | PS5 | | RPG | Nihon Falcom | NIS America | |
| February 16 | Mario vs. Donkey Kong | NS | Remake | Puzzle-platformer | Nintendo Software Technology | Nintendo | |
| February 16 | Recolit | WIN, OSX | | Puzzle, Adventure | Image Labo | Image Labo, Yokaze | |
| February 16 | Skull and Bones | WIN, PS5, XBX/S | Original | Action-adventure | Ubisoft Singapore | Ubisoft | |
| February 20 | Balatro | WIN, NS, PS4, PS5, XBO, XBX/S | Original | Deck building (roguelike) | LocalThunk | Playstack | |
| February 20 | The Lost Legends of Redwall: The Scout Anthology | WIN, OSX, PS4, PS5, XBO, XBX/S | | Adventure | Soma Games | Forthright Entertainment | |
| February 21 | Bandle Tale: A League of Legends Story | WIN, NS | | RPG | Lazy Bear Games | Riot Forge | |
| February 21 | Battletoads in Battlemaniacs | NS | Port | Brawler, Platformer | Rare | NA: Tradewest; PAL: Nintendo | |
| February 21 | Blast Corps | NS | Port | Action, Puzzle | Rare | Nintendo | |
| February 21 | Killer Instinct | NS | Port | Fighting | Rare | Nintendo | |
| February 21 | Last Epoch | WIN | | Action RPG | Eleventh Hour Games | | |
| February 21 | Mother 3 (JP) | NS | Port | RPG | 1-Up Studio Inc., HAL Laboratory | Nintendo | |
| February 21 | Penny's Big Breakaway | WIN, NS, PS5, XBX/S | Original | Action, Platformer | Evening Star | Private Division | |
| February 21 | R.C. Pro-Am | NS | Port | Racing, Vehicular combat | Rare | Nintendo | |
| February 21 | Slave Zero X | WIN, NS, PS4, PS5, XBO, XBX/S | Original | Platformer | Poppy Works | Ziggurat Interactive | |
| February 21 | Snake Rattle 'n' Roll | NS | Port | Platformer | Rare | Nintendo | |
| February 21 | Tenderfoot Tactics | NS, XBO, XBX/S | | Tactical RPG | Badru, Isa Hutchinson, Taylor Thomas, Zoe Vartanian | Ice Water Games | |
| February 21 | Terminator: Dark Fate – Defiance | WIN | Original | RTS | Slitherine Software | | |
| February 22 | CorpoNation: The Sorting Process | WIN | | CMS | Canteen | Playtonic Friends | |
| February 22 | Garden Life: A Cozy Simulator | WIN, PS4, PS5, XBO, XBX/S | | CMS | stillalive studios | Nacon | |
| February 22 | Inkulinati | WIN, PS4, PS5, XBO, XBX/S | | TBS | Yaza Games | Daedalic Entertainment | |
| February 22 | King Arthur: Knight's Tale | PS5, XBX/S | Port | Tactical RPG | NeocoreGames | | |
| February 22 | Pacific Drive | PS5, WIN | Original | Survival | Ironwood Studios | Kepler Interactive | |
| February 22 | Pentiment | NS, PS4, PS5 | Port | Adventure, RPG | Obsidian Entertainment | Xbox Game Studios | |
| February 22 | Retro Game Challenge 1 + 2 Replay (JP) | NS | Compilation | Minigame | Bandai Namco Studios | Bandai Namco Entertainment | |
| February 22 | Shin chan: Shiro and the Coal Town (JP) | NS | | Adventure | h.a.n.d. | Neos | |
| February 22 | Solium Infernum | WIN | | Strategy | League of Geeks | | |
| February 22 | Sons of the Forest | WIN | Full release | Survival | Endnight Games | Newnight | |
| February 22 | Yohane the Parhelion: Numazu in the Mirage | WIN, NS, PS5 | | Deck building (roguelike) | BeXide | | |
| February 23 | Eggy Party | iOS, DROID | | Party, Battle royale | NetEase Games | | |
| February 23 | Promenade | WIN, NS, PS4, PS5, XBO, XBX/S | | Platformer | Holy Cap | Red Art Games | |
| February 27 | Dicefolk | WIN | | Roguelike, Strategy | LEAP Game Studios, Tiny Ghoul | Good Shepherd Entertainment | |
| February 27 | Shiren the Wanderer: The Mystery Dungeon of Serpentcoil Island | NS | | Roguelike, RPG | Spike Chunsoft | | |
| February 27 | Sympathy Kiss | NS | | Visual novel | Design Factory | Idea Factory International | |
| February 27 | Wrath: Aeon of Ruin | WIN | | FPS | KillPixel | 3D Realms, Fulqrum Publishing | |
| February 28 | Brothers: A Tale of Two Sons Remake | WIN, PS5, XBX/S | Remake | Adventure | Avantgarden | 505 Games | |
| February 28 | Spiritfall | WIN, OSX | Full release | Roguelike, Platformer | Gentle Giant | | |
| February 28 | Star Wars: Dark Forces Remaster | WIN, NS, PS4, PS5, XBO, XBX/S | Remaster | FPS | Nightdive Studios | | |
| February 29 | Bar Stella Abyss (JP) | NS, PS4, PS5 | | Roguelike, Strategy, RPG | Nippon Ichi Software | | |
| February 29 | Final Fantasy VII Rebirth | PS5 | Remake | Action RPG | Square Enix | | |
| February 29 | Freddi Fish and the Case of the Missing Kelp Seeds | NS, PS4 | | Adventure | Humongous Entertainment | UFO Interactive Games | |
| February 29 | Goblin Slayer Another Adventurer: Nightmare Feast (JP) | WIN, NS | | Tactical RPG | Apollosoft, Mebius | Bushiroad Games | |
| February 29 | Heavenly Bodies | NS | | Adventure | 2pt Interactive | | |
| February 29 | Matsurika no Kei -kEi- Tenmeiin Iden (JP) | NS | | Visual novel | Otomate | Idea Factory | |
| February 29 | Of the Red, the Light, and the Ayakashi Tsuzuri | WIN, NS | | Visual novel | HaccaWorks | Dramatic Create | |
| February 29 | Riviera: The Promised Land – Remaster (JP) | NS | Remaster | RPG | Sting Entertainment | | |
| February 29 | Welcome to ParadiZe | WIN, PS5, XBX/S | | Survival, Action | Eko Software | Nacon | |
| March 1 | Ufouria: The Saga 2 | WIN, NS, PS5, XBX/S | | Platformer | Sunsoft | | |
| March 4 | The Thaumaturge | WIN | | RPG | Fool's Theory | 11 Bit Studios | |
| March 5 | Classified: France '44 | WIN, PS5, XBX/S | Original | TBT | Absolutely Games | Team17 | |
| March 5 | Expeditions: A MudRunner Game | WIN, NS, PS4, PS5, XBO, XBX/S | | Vehicle sim | Saber Interactive | Focus Entertainment | |
| March 5 | Kingdom: The Blood | WIN, iOS, DROID | | Action RPG | Action Square | Action Square, YJM Games | |
| March 5 | Mediterranea Inferno | WIN, NS, PS4, PS5, XBX/S | | Visual novel | EyeGuys | Santa Ragione | |
| March 5 | The Outlast Trials | WIN, PS4, PS5, XBO, XBX/S | Full release | Survival horror | Red Barrels | | |
| March 6 | Berserk Boy | WIN, NS | | Action RPG | BerserkBoy Games | | |
| March 6 | S.T.A.L.K.E.R.: Legends of the Zone Trilogy | PS4, XBO | Compilation | FPS, Survival horror | GSC Game World | | |
| March 7 | As Dusk Falls | PS4, PS5 | | Narrative adventure | Interior Night | | |
| March 7 | Blade Prince Academy | WIN | | Strategy, RPG | Angel Corp | Firesquid | |
| March 7 | Fitness Boxing feat. Hatsune Miku: Isshoni Exercise (JP) | NS | | Fitness, Rhythm, Sports | Imagineer | | |
| March 7 | Manic Mechanics | WIN, PS4, PS5, XBO, XBX/S | Port | Party | 4J Studios | | |
| March 7 | Snufkin: Melody of Moominvalley | WIN, NS | | Adventure | Hyper Games | Raw Fury | |
| March 7 | Top Racer Collection | WIN, NS, PS4, PS5, XBO, XBX/S | Compilation | Racing | QUByte Interactive | | |
| March 7 | The Weird Dream | WIN | | Metroidvania | Shanghai AmberDragon | WhisperGames | |
| March 8 | Ancient Weapon Holly | WIN, NS, PS5 | | Action, Roguelike | Acquire | Acquire, Aniplex | |
| March 8 | Unicorn Overlord | NS, PS4, PS5, XBX/S | Original | Tactical RPG | Vanillaware | Atlus | |
| March 8 | WWE 2K24 | WIN, PS4, PS5, XBO, XBX/S | Original | Sports | Visual Concepts | 2K | |
| March 9 | A Difficult Game About Climbing | WIN, DROID | | Platformer | Pontypants | | |
| March 12 | Contra: Operation Galuga | WIN, NS, PS4, PS5, XBO, XBX/S | Original | Run and gun | WayForward | Konami | |
| March 12 | Dr. Mario (Game Boy) | NS | Port | Puzzle | Nintendo R&D1 | Nintendo | |
| March 12 | Mario Golf (Game Boy Color) | NS | Port | Sports, RPG | Camelot Software Planning | Nintendo | |
| March 12 | Mario Tennis (Game Boy Color) | NS | Port | Sports, RPG | Camelot Software Planning | Nintendo | |
| March 13 | Llamasoft: The Jeff Minter Story | WIN, PS4, PS5, XBO, XBX/S, NS | | —N/a | Digital Eclipse | | |
| March 14 | Death Trick: Double Blind | WIN, NS | | Adventure | Misty Mountain Studio | Neon Doctrine | |
| March 14 | Garden Life: A Cozy Simulator | NS | | CMS | stillalive studios | Nacon | |
| March 14 | Ib | PS4, PS5 | | Adventure, Horror | Kouri | Playism | |
| March 14 | Macross Shooting Insight (JP) | WIN, NS, PS4, PS5 | | Shoot 'em up | Kaminari Games | Bushiroad Games | |
| March 14 | Star Wars: Battlefront Classic Collection | WIN, NS, PS4, PS5, XBO, XBX/S | Compilation | FPS, TPS | Aspyr | | |
| March 15 | CookieRun: Witch's Castle | iOS, DROID | | Tile-matching | Devsisters | | |
| March 15 | Kingdom Come: Deliverance | NS | Port | Action RPG | Warhorse Studios, Saber Interactive | Saber Interactive | |
| March 18 | Fruit Mountain | WIN, OSX | | Puzzle | BeXide | | |
| March 19 | Hi-Fi Rush | PS5 | Port | Action, Rhythm | Tango Gameworks | Bethesda Softworks | |
| March 19 | Lightyear Frontier | WIN, XBX/S | Early access | Adventure, Farming | Frame Break | Coffee Stain Publishing | |
| March 19 | MLB The Show 24 | NS, PS4, PS5, XBO, XBX/S | Original | Sports | San Diego Studio | MLB Advanced Media, Sony Interactive Entertainment | |
| March 20 | Alone in the Dark | WIN, PS5, XBX/S | Original | Survival horror | Pieces Interactive | THQ Nordic | |
| March 21 | Call of Duty: Warzone Mobile | iOS, DROID | Original | FPS, Battle royale | Digital Legends Entertainment, Beenox, Activision Shanghai Studio, Solid State Studios | Activision | |
| March 21 | Final Fantasy XIV | XBX/S | Port | MMO, RPG | Square Enix | | |
| March 21 | Horizon Forbidden West Complete Edition | WIN | Port | Action RPG | Guerrilla Games, Nixxes Software | Sony Interactive Entertainment | |
| March 21 | Ikonei Island: An Earthlock Adventure | PS4, XBO | | Adventure, Sandbox | Snowcastle Games | | |
| March 21 | Krimson | WIN, NS, PS4, PS5, XBO, XBX/S | | Rhythm, Platformer | CryingPsycho | PM Studios | |
| March 21 | Tchia | WIN | | Adventure | Awacab | | |
| March 22 | Dragon's Dogma 2 | WIN, PS5, XBX/S | Original | Action RPG | Capcom | | |
| March 22 | The Legend of Legacy HD Remastered | WIN, NS, PS4, PS5 | Remaster | RPG | Cattle Call, FuRyu | NIS America | |
| March 22 | Princess Peach: Showtime! | NS | Original | Action-adventure | Good-Feel | Nintendo | |
| March 22 | Rise of the Rōnin | PS5 | Original | Action RPG | Team Ninja | Sony Interactive Entertainment | |
| March 25 | Ancient Weapon Holly | PS4 | | Action, Roguelike | Acquire | Acquire, Aniplex | |
| March 25 | Palia | WIN, NS | | Life sim | Singularity 6 | | |
| March 26 | Boomeroad | WIN | | Action-adventure | Gyaar Studio | Phoenixx | |
| March 26 | Bulwark: Falconeer Chronicles | WIN, PS4, PS5, XBO, XBX/S | | City builder, Strategy | Tomas Sala | Wired Productions | |
| March 26 | Doronko Wanko | WIN | | Simulation | Gyaar Studio | Phoenixx | |
| March 26 | Grandia HD Collection | PS4, XBO | Remaster, Compilation | RPG | Game Arts, Sickhead Games | GungHo Online Entertainment | |
| March 26 | Nottolot | WIN | | Action | Gyaar Studio | Phoenixx | |
| March 26 | Planet Zoo | PS5, XBX/S | | CMS | Frontier Developments | | |
| March 26 | South Park: Snow Day! | WIN, NS, PS5, XBX/S | | Action RPG | Question | THQ Nordic | |
| March 27 | Millenia | WIN | | TBS, 4X | C Prompt Games | Paradox Interactive | |
| March 27 | Terra Memoria | WIN, NS, PS5, XBX/S | | Action RPG | La Moutarde | Dear Villagers | |
| March 28 | An Alt Girl for Skoof | WIN | | Visual novel | Terletski Games, Rik Animation | Terletski Games | |
| March 28 | Amairo Chocolate | NS | | Visual novel | Cabbage Soft | Dramatic Create | |
| March 28 | Felix the Cat | NS, PS4, PS5 | | Platformer | Konami Digital Entertainment, Limited Run Games | Konami Digital Entertainment | |
| March 28 | Hebereke: Enjoy Edition | NS | | Action-adventure | City Connection | | |
| March 28 | Muv-Luv Alternative Remastered (JP) | NS | Renaster | Visual novel | aNCHOR | | |
| March 28 | Muv-Luv Remastered (JP) | NS | Remaster | Visual novel | aNCHOR | | |
| March 28 | Open Roads | WIN, NS, PS4, PS5, XBX/S | | Adventure | Open Roads Team | Annapurna Interactive | |
| March 28 | Otxo | NS, PS4, PS5 | | Shoot 'em up | Lateralis Heavy Industries | Super Rare Originals | |
| March 28 | Pepper Grinder | WIN, NS | | Action-adventure, Platformer | Ahr Ech | Devolver Digital | |
| March 28 | Radirgy 2 (JP) | NS, PS4, PS5 | | Shoot 'em up | RS34 | BEEP Japan | |
| March 28 | Stasis: Bone Totem | NS, PS4, PS5, XBO, XBX/S | | PCA | The Brotherhood | The Brotherhood, Feardemic | |
| March 28 | Touch Detective 3 + The Complete Case Files | NS | | PCA | Beeworks, Success | Nicalis | |
| March 28 | Winning Post 10 2024 (JP) | WIN, NS, PS4, PS5 | | Sports, Simulation | Koei Tecmo | | |
| March 29 | F-Zero: Maximum Velocity | NS | Port | Racing | NDcube | Nintendo | |

=== April–June ===
| Release date | Title | Platform(s) | Type | Genre(s) | Developer(s) | Publisher(s) | Ref. |
|---|---|---|---|---|---|---|---|
| April 1 | Content Warning | WIN | Original | Survival horror | Skog, Zorro, Wilnyl, Philip, thePetHen | Landfall Publishing | |
| April 2 | Minishoot' Adventures | WIN | | Adventure | SoulGame Studio | SoulGame Studio, IndieArk | |
| April 3 | Dungeon Artifact | WIN | Early access | Deck building, Roguelike | itokon | ExertionGame | |
| April 3 | Touhou Hero of Ice Fairy | WIN | | Bullet hell | GAMEPULSE | GAMEPULSE, Phoenixx | |
| April 4 | Freedom Planet 2 | NS, PS4, PS5, XBO, XBX/S | Port | Platformer | GalaxyTrail | Xseed Games | |
| April 4 | The Gap | NS | | Walking sim, Narrative adventure | Label This | Crunching Koalas | |
| April 4 | Turbo Golf Racing | WIN, PS5, XBO, XBX/S | | Sports, Racing | Hugecalf Studios | Secret Mode | |
| April 5 | Biomorph | WIN | Original | Soulslike, Metroidvania | Lucid Dreams Studio | | |
| April 5 | PuzzMiX | NS | | Puzzle | Inti Creates | | |
| April 9 | Botany Manor | WIN, NS, XBO, XBX/S | | Adventure, Puzzle | Balloon Studios | Whitethorn Games | |
| April 9 | Children of the Sun | WIN | | TPS, Puzzle | Rene Rother | Devolver Digital | |
| April 9 | Gigantic: Rampage Edition | WIN, PS4, PS5, XBO, XBX/S | Rerelease | MOBA | Abstraction Games | Arc Games | |
| April 9 | Inkbound | WIN | | Roguelike, RPG | Shiny Shoe | | |
| April 9 | Yellow Taxi Goes Vroom | WIN | | Platformer | Panik Arcade | Those Awesome Guys | |
| April 10 | Broken Roads | WIN, PS4, PS5, XBO, XBX/S | | RPG | Drop Bear Bytes | Versus Evil | |
| April 10 | Ereban: Shadow Legacy | WIN | | Stealth, Action, Platformer | Baby Robot Games | | |
| April 10 | The Planet Crafter | WIN | Full release | Survival | Miju Games | | |
| April 10 | Turbo Kid | WIN | | Metroidvania, Action-adventure | Outerminds | | |
| April 11 | Headquarters: World War II | WIN | | TBS, TBT | Starni Games | Slitherine Software | |
| April 11 | Utakata no Uchronia (JP) | NS | | Visual novel | LicoBiTs | Broccoli | |
| April 11 | Wildfrost | iOS, DROID | | Deck building, Roguelike | Deadpan Games, Gaziter | Chucklefish | |
| April 12 | Amazing Hebereke | NS | Port | Fighting | Sunsoft, OLM | Sunsoft | |
| April 12 | Anomaly Collapse | WIN | | TBS, Roguelike | RocketPunch Games | Spiral Up Games | |
| April 12 | Marvelous: Mōhitotsu no Takarajima (JP) | NS | Port | Adventure, RPG | Nintendo R&D2 | Nintendo | |
| April 12 | Super R-Type | NS | Port | Scrolling shooter | Irem | JP/NA: Irem; EU: Nintendo | |
| April 12 | Wrecking Crew '98 | NS | Port | Action, Puzzle | Nintendo R&D1, Pax Softnica | Nintendo | |
| April 14 | Bendy: Secrets of the Machine | WIN | | Survival horror | Joey Drew Studios | | |
| April 15 | Perish | PS4, PS5, XBO, XBX/S | | Roguelike, FPS | Item42 | HandyGames | |
| April 16 | Dave the Diver | PS4, PS5 | Port | Fishing, Adventure | Mintrocket | | |
| April 16 | Grounded | NS, PS4, PS5 | Port | Survival | Obsidian Entertainment | Xbox Game Studios | |
| April 16 | Harold Halibut | WIN, PS5, XBX/S | Original | Adventure | Slow Bros. | | |
| April 16 | Life Eater | WIN | | Puzzle | Strange Scaffold | Strange Scaffold, Frosty Pop | |
| April 16 | Planet of Lana | NS, PS4, PS5 | | Puzzle-platformer | Wishfully Studios | Thunderful Publishing | |
| April 17 | The Exit 8 | NS | | Walking sim, Horror | Kotake Create | Playism | |
| April 18 | Bunny Garden | WIN, NS | | Dating sim | qureate | | |
| April 18 | Ikki Unite | NS | | Action, Roguelike | Sunsoft | | |
| April 18 | Soul Covenant | WIN, PS5 | | Action RPG | Thirdverse | | |
| April 18 | SUNSOFT is Back! Retro Game Selection (JP) | WIN, NS | | —N/a | Sunsoft | | |
| April 18 | Umurangi Generation | PS4, PS5 | | Photography | Origame Digital | Playism | |
| April 19 | Dementium: The Ward | PS4, PS5 | | Horror, FPS | atooi | | |
| April 19 | PuzzMiX | WIN | | Puzzle | Inti Creates | | |
| April 19 | Richman 11 | PS4, PS5, XBO, XBX/S | | Digital tabletop | Softstar | eastasiasoft | |
| April 23 | Eiyuden Chronicle: Hundred Heroes | WIN, NS, PS4, PS5, XBO, XBX/S | | RPG | Rabbit and Bear Studios | 505 Games | |
| April 23 | Hammerwatch 2 | PS4, XBX/S | | Hack and slash, Action RPG | Crackshell | Modus Games | |
| April 23 | Lunar Lander Beyond | WIN, NS, PS5, XBX/S | | Vehicle sim (spaceship) | Atari | Dreams Uncorporated | |
| April 23 | Phantom Fury | WIN | | FPS | Slipgate Ironworks | 3D Realms | |
| April 23 | Sucker for Love: Date to Die For | WIN | | Dating sim, Visual novel | Akabaka | DreadXP | |
| April 23 | Tales of Kenzera: Zau | WIN, NS, PS5, XBX/S | | Metroidvania | Surgent Studios | Electronic Arts | |
| April 23 | Teenage Mutant Ninja Turtles Arcade: Wrath of the Mutants | WIN, NS, PS4, PS5, XBO, XBX/S | Port | Brawler | Raw Thrills, Cradle Games | GameMill Entertainment | |
| April 24 | Extreme-G | NS | Port | Racing | Probe Entertainment | Acclaim Entertainment | |
| April 24 | Iggy's Reckin' Balls | NS | Port | Platformer, Racing | Iguana Entertainment | Acclaim Entertainment | |
| April 24 | Insurmountable | NS, PS4, PS5, XBO, XBX/S | | Roguelike, Adventure | ByteRockers' Games | Daedalic Entertainment | |
| April 25 | Another Crab's Treasure | WIN, NS, PS5, XBX/S | Original | Action-adventure | Aggro Crab | | |
| April 25 | Assault Suit Leynos 2 Saturn Tribute | WIN, NS, PS4, XBO | | Shoot 'em up | City Connection | | |
| April 25 | Demon Slayer: Kimetsu no Yaiba – Sweep the Board (JP) | NS | | Digital tabletop | CyberConnect2 | Aniplex | |
| April 25 | Megaton Musashi: Wired | WIN, NS, PS4, PS5 | | Action | Level-5 | | |
| April 25 | SaGa: Emerald Beyond | WIN, NS, PS4, PS5, iOS, DROID | | RPG | Square Enix | | |
| April 25 | Whisker Waters | WIN, NS, PS5 | | RPG | Underbite Games | Merge Games | |
| April 26 | Class of Heroes 2G: Remaster Edition | WIN, NS, PS5 | Remaster | RPG, Dungeon crawl | Acquire | Acquire, PQube | |
| April 26 | Class of Heroes: Anniversary Edition | WIN, NS, PS5 | Remake | RPG, Dungeon crawl | Acquire | Acquire, PQube | |
| April 26 | Demon Slayer: Kimetsu no Yaiba – Sweep the Board | NS | | Digital tabletop | CyberConnect2 | Sega | |
| April 26 | Pools | WIN | | Walking sim, Horror | Tensori | UNIKAT label | |
| April 26 | PuzzMiX | PS4, PS5 | | Puzzle | Inti Creates | | |
| April 26 | Sand Land | WIN, PS4, PS5, XBX/S | | Action RPG | ILCA | Bandai Namco Entertainment | |
| April 26 | Stellar Blade | PS5 | Original | Action-adventure | Shift Up | Sony Interactive Entertainment | |
| April 26 | TopSpin 2K25 | WIN, PS4, PS5, XBO, XBX/S | | Sports | Hangar 13 | 2K | |
| April 26 | Triggerheart Exelica | WIN | | Shoot 'em up | Cosmo Machia | | |
| April 28 | El Shaddai: Ascension of the Metatron - HD Remaster | NS | Remaster | Action-adventure | crim | Rainy Frog | |
| April 30 | Front Mission 2: Remake | WIN, PS4, PS5, XBO, XBX/S | Port | Tactical RPG | Storm Trident | Forever Entertainment | |
| April 30 | Sea of Thieves | PS5 | Port | Action-adventure | Rare | Xbox Game Studios | |
| May 2 | Endless Ocean Luminous | NS | | Adventure, Simulation | Arika | Nintendo | |
| May 2 | Freddi Fish 2: The Case of the Haunted Schoolhouse | NS, PS4 | | Adventure | Humongous Entertainment | UFO Interactive Games | |
| May 2 | Freddi Fish 5: The Case of the Creature of Coral Cove | NS, PS4 | | Adventure | Humongous Entertainment | UFO Interactive Games | |
| May 2 | MotoGP 24 | WIN, NS, PS4, PS5, XBO, XBX/S | | Racing | Milestone | | |
| May 2 | The Political Machine 2024 | WIN | | Government sim | Stardock | | |
| May 2 | Sclash | NS, PS4, PS5, XBO, XBX/S | | Fighting | Bevel Bakery | Maximum Entertainment, Abiding Bridge | |
| May 2 | Touhou Mystia's Izakaya | NS | | Life sim | Dichroic Purpilion | Phoenixx | |
| May 2 | Triggerheart Exelica | NS | | Shoot 'em up | Cosmo Machia | | |
| May 3 | Cyber Citizen Shockman 3: The Princess from Another World | NS, PS4, PS5, XBO, XBX/S | | Action, Platformer | Shinyuden | Ratalaika Games | |
| May 3 | Save Me Mr Tako: Definitive Edition | PS4 | Port | Platformer, Action RPG | Deneos Games | Limited Run Games | |
| May 7 | Sonic Mania Plus | iOS, DROID | Port | Platformer, Action | Christian Whitehead, Headcannon, PagodaWest Games, Sonic Team | Sega | |
| May 8 | Indika | WIN | | Narrative adventure | Odd Meter | 11 Bit Studios | |
| May 8 | Solo Leveling: Arise | iOS, DROID | | Action RPG | Netmarble Neo | Netmarble | |
| May 8 | V Rising | WIN | Original | Survival | Stunlock Studios | Level Infinite | |
| May 9 | 1000xRESIST | WIN, NS | | Adventure | sunset visitor | Fellow Traveller | |
| May 9 | Animal Well | WIN, NS, PS5 | Original | Metroidvania, Puzzle | Shared Memory | Bigmode | |
| May 9 | The Bridge Curse 2: The Extrication | WIN | | Horror | Softstar | | |
| May 9 | CorpoNation: The Sorting Process | NS, XBO, XBX/S | | Simulation | Canteen | Playtonic Friends | |
| May 9 | Crow Country | WIN, PS5, XBX/S | | Survival horror | SFB Games | | |
| May 9 | Cryptmaster | WIN | | Dungeon crawl | Akupara Games | | |
| May 9 | Gift | WIN, NS, PS5, XBX/S | | Action-adventure | Toydium, Million Edge | Bushiroad Games | |
| May 9 | Little Kitty, Big City | WIN, NS, XBO, XBX/S | | Adventure | Double Dagger Studio | | |
| May 9 | Pac-Man Mega Tunnel Battle: Chomp Champs | WIN, NS, PS4, PS5, XBO, XBX/S | | Maze, Battle royale | Amber Studio | Bandai Namco Entertainment | |
| May 9 | Rabbit and Steel | WIN | | Action, Roguelike | mino_dev | mino_dev | |
| May 9 | Rainbow Cotton | WIN, NS, PS4, PS5, XBO | | Shoot 'em up | Success | ININ Games | |
| May 10 | Instruments of Destruction | WIN | Full release | Simulation | Radiangames | | |
| May 13 | Fabledom | WIN | Full release | Simulation | Grenaa Games | Dear Villagers | |
| May 13 | Homeworld 3 | WIN | | RTS | Blackbird Interactive | Gearbox Publishing | |
| May 13 | Samurai Warriors 4 DX | WIN | | Hack and slash | Omega Force | Koei Tecmo | |
| May 14 | Biomutant | NS | Port | Action RPG | Experiment 101 | THQ Nordic | |
| May 14 | Braid Anniversary Edition | WIN, NS, PS4, PS5, XBO, XBX/S, iOS, DROID | | Puzzle | Thekla | | |
| May 14 | Dread Delusion | WIN | | RPG | Lovely Hellplace | DreadXP | |
| May 14 | Lysfanga: The Time Shift Warrior | NS | | Hack and slash | Sand Door Studio | Quantic Dream | |
| May 14 | Neptunia Game Maker R:Evolution | NS, PS4, PS5 | | RPG | Compile Heart | Idea Factory International | |
| May 14 | Slayers X: Terminal Aftermath: Vengance of the Slayer | NS, PS4, PS5 | | FPS | Big Z Studios | No More Robots | |
| May 14 | Stumble Guys | PS4, PS5 | | Party, Battle royale | Scopely | | |
| May 15 | Aeruta | WIN | Early access | Action RPG, Life sim | FromDawn Games | Gravity Game Arise | |
| May 15 | Alleyway | NS | Port | Breakout clone | Intelligent Systems, Nintendo R&D1 | Nintendo | |
| May 15 | Baladins | WIN | | Adventure | Seed by Seed | Armor Games Studios | |
| May 15 | Baseball (Game Boy) | NS | Port | Sports | Intelligent Systems, Nintendo R&D1 | Nintendo | |
| May 15 | Kaeru no Tame ni Kane wa Naru (JP) | NS | Port | Action RPG | Intelligent Systems, Nintendo R&D1 | Nintendo | |
| May 15 | Mullet MadJack | WIN | | Roguelike, FPS | Hammer95 | | |
| May 15 | Super Mario Land | NS | Port | Platformer | Nintendo R&D1 | Nintendo | |
| May 16 | Arctic Eggs | WIN, OSX, LIN | | Cooking | The Water Museum, cockydoody, abmarnie, Cameron Ginex | The Water Museum | |
| May 16 | Gakuen Idolmaster (JP) | iOS, DROID | | Raising sim | QualiArts | Bandai Namco Entertainment | |
| May 16 | Ghost of Tsushima Director's Cut | WIN | Port | Action-adventure | Sucker Punch Productions, Nixxes Software | Sony Interactive Entertainment | |
| May 16 | Lorelei and the Laser Eyes | WIN, NS | | Puzzle | Simogo | Annapurna Interactive | |
| May 16 | Please Fix the Road | NS | | Puzzle | Arielek | Silesia Games | |
| May 16 | PO'ed: Definitive Edition | WIN, NS, PS4, PS5, XBO, XBX/S | Remaster | FPS | Nightdive Studios | | |
| May 16 | ROBOBEAT | WIN | | Roguelike, Rhythm, FPS | Inzanity | Kwalee | |
| May 17 | Indika | PS5, XBX/S | | Narrative adventure | Odd Meter | 11 Bit Studios | |
| May 18 | Indigo Park: Chapter 1 | WIN | | Horror | UniqueGeese | | |
| May 20 | One-inch Tactics | WIN | | TBS | Kogado Studio | Komodo | |
| May 20 | Songs of Conquest | WIN, OSX | Full release | TBS | Lavapotion | Coffee Stain Publishing | |
| May 20 | World of Warcraft: Cataclysm Classic | WIN, OSX | Rerelease | MMO, RPG | Blizzard Entertainment | | |
| May 21 | Neptunia: Sisters VS Sisters | XBO, XBX/S | | RPG | Compile Heart | Idea Factory International | |
| May 21 | Paper Trail | WIN, NS, PS4, PS5, XBO, XBX/S, iOS, DROID | Original | Adventure, Puzzle | Newfangled Games | | |
| May 21 | Senua's Saga: Hellblade II | WIN, XBX/S | Original | Action-adventure | Ninja Theory | Xbox Game Studios | |
| May 21 | System Shock | PS4, PS5, XBO, XBX/S | Port | Action-adventure | Nightdive Studios | Prime Matter | |
| May 21 | XDefiant | WIN, PS5, XBX/S | Original | FPS | Ubisoft San Francisco | Ubisoft | |
| May 22 | Isles of Sea and Sky | WIN | Original | Puzzle | Cicada Games | Cicada Games, Gamera Games | |
| May 22 | RKGK / Rakugaki | WIN | | Action-adventure | Wabisabi Games | Gearbox Publishing | |
| May 22 | Venture to the Vile | WIN | | Metroidvania | Cut to Bits | Aniplex | |
| May 22 | Wuthering Waves | WIN, iOS, DROID | Original | Action RPG | Kuro Games | | |
| May 23 | C.A.R.D.S. RPG: The Misty Battlefield | WIN, NS, PS4, PS5 | | Tactical RPG | Acquire | | |
| May 23 | Crown Wars: The Black Prince | WIN, PS5, XBX/S | | TBS | Artefacts Studio | Nacon | |
| May 23 | Duck Detective: The Secret Salami | WIN, OSX, LIN, NS | | Adventure | Happy Broccoli Games | | |
| May 23 | Earth Defense Force: World Brothers 2 (JP) | NS, PS4, PS5 | | TPS | Yuke's | D3 Publisher | |
| May 23 | Eternal Threads | NS, PS4, PS5, XBO, XBX/S | | Puzzle | Cosmonaut Studios | Secret Mode | |
| May 23 | Galacticare | WIN, PS5, XBX/S | | Business sim | Brightrock Games | CULT Games | |
| May 23 | Hauntii | WIN, NS, PS4, PS5, XBO, XBX/S | | Adventure | Moonloop Games | Firestoke | |
| May 23 | Hyperdimension Neptunia Re;Birth1 (JP) | NS | | RPG | Compile Heart | | |
| May 23 | Hyperdimension Neptunia Re;Birth2: Sisters Generation (JP) | NS | | RPG | Compile Heart | | |
| May 23 | Hyperdimension Neptunia Re;Birth3: V Generation (JP) | NS | | RPG | Compile Heart | | |
| May 23 | Paper Mario: The Thousand-Year Door | NS | Remake | RPG | Intelligent Systems | Nintendo | |
| May 23 | The Quintessential Quintuplets: Five Memories Spent With You | NS, PS4 | | Visual novel | Mages | Spike Chunsoft | |
| May 23 | The Quintessential Quintuplets: Memories of a Quintessential Summer | NS, PS4 | | Visual novel | Mages | Spike Chunsoft | |
| May 23 | Wizardry: Proving Grounds of the Mad Overlord | WIN, NS, PS4, PS5, XBO, XBX/S | Full release | Dungeon crawl, RPG | Digital Eclipse | | |
| May 23 | Ys Memoire: The Oath in Felghana (JP) | PS4, PS5 | | Action RPG | Nihon Falcom | | |
| May 24 | Devil Blade Reboot | WIN | Remake | Scrolling shooter (vertical) | Shigatake Games | | |
| May 24 | Dragon Ball Xenoverse 2 | PS5, XBX/S | | Fighting, RPG | Dimps | Bandai Namco Entertainment | |
| May 24 | PuzzMiX | XBO, XBX/S | | Puzzle | Inti Creates | | |
| May 24 | Shinjuku Soumei | WIN | | Visual novel | G-Mode, Plus81 | G-Mode | |
| May 28 | Anthology of the Killer | WIN, OSX, LIN | | Horror | thecatamites | | |
| May 28 | Cupid Parasite: Sweet & Spicy Darling | NS | | Visual novel | Idea Factory | Idea Factory International | |
| May 28 | MultiVersus | WIN, PS4, PS5, XBO, XBX/S | Full release | Fighting | Player First Games | Warner Bros. Games | |
| May 28 | Tevi | PS4, PS5, XBO, XBX/S | | Metroidvania | CreSpirit, GemaYue | CreSpirit | |
| May 29 | Capes | WIN, NS, PS4, PS5, XBO, XBX/S | | TBS | Spitfire Interactive | Daedalic Entertainment | |
| May 29 | Nine Sols | WIN, OSX | | Action, Platformer | Red Candle Games | | |
| May 29 | Riviera: The Promised Land – Remaster (JP) | iOS, DROID | Remaster | RPG | Sting Entertainment | | |
| May 29 | Squad Busters | iOS, DROID | | MOBA | Supercell | | |
| May 30 | Astor: Blade of the Monolith | WIN, NS, PS4, PS5, XBO, XBX/S | | Action RPG | C2 Game Studio | Versus Evil | |
| May 30 | Horizon Chase 2 | PS4, PS5, XBO, XBX/S | | Racing | Aquiris | Epic Games | |
| May 30 | Humanity | XBO, XBX/S | | Puzzle | THA | Enhance | |
| May 30 | Ninja Kamui: Shinobi Origins | NS | | Action | G.rev | Rainmaker Productions | |
| May 30 | Picross S Namco Legendary edition | NS | Compilation | Puzzle | Jupiter Corporation | | |
| May 30 | Skald: Against the Black Priory | WIN, OSX | | RPG | High North Studios | Raw Fury Games | |
| May 30 | Tokyo Psychodemic (JP) | WIN, NS, PS4, PS5 | | Adventure | Gravity Game Arise | | |
| May 30 | Umbraclaw | WIN, NS, PS4, PS5, XBO, XBX/S | | Adventure, Action | Inti Creates | | |
| May 30 | WiZmans World Re:Try (JP) | NS, PS4, PS5 | | RPG | Lancarse, City Connection | City Connection | |
| May 30 | Xuan-Yuan Sword VII | NS | | Action RPG | Softstar, DOMO Studio | eastasiasoft | |
| May 31 | F1 24 | WIN, PS4, PS5, XBO, XBX/S | Original | Racing | Codemasters | EA Sports | |
| May 31 | Hypercharge: Unboxed | XBO, XBX/S | | FPS, TPS, Tower defense | Digital Cybercherries | | |
| May 31 | Nightmare Kart | WIN | | Racing | LWMedia | | |
| May 31 | Platform 8 | WIN | | Horror, Adventure | Kotake Create | | |
| June 3 | The Elder Scrolls Online: Gold Road | WIN, OSX | Expansion | MMO, RPG | ZeniMax Online Studios | Bethesda Softworks | |
| June 4 | Destiny 2: The Final Shape | WIN, PS4, PS5, XBO, XBX/S | | FPS, Action RPG | Bungie | | |
| June 4 | Killer Klowns from Outer Space: The Game | WIN, PS5, XBX/S | | Survival horror | IllFonic, Teravision Games | IllFonic | |
| June 4 | Star Wars: Hunters | NS, iOS, DROID | Original | TPS | NaturalMotion, BossAlien | Zynga | |
| June 5 | Octopath Traveler | PS4, PS5 | Port | RPG | Square Enix, Acquire | Square Enix | |
| June 5 | Octopath Traveler II | XBO, XBX/S | Port | RPG | Square Enix, Acquire | Square Enix | |
| June 6 | Blockbuster Inc. | WIN | | Simulation | Super Sly Fox | Ancient Forge | |
| June 6 | Garage: Bad Dream Adventure | NS | | PCA | Sakuba Metal Works, SmokymonkeyS | Sakuba Metal Works | |
| June 6 | The Smurfs: Village Party | WIN, NS, PS4, PS5, XBO, XBX/S | | Party | Balio Studio | Microids | |
| June 6 | Touhou Spell Carnival (JP) | NS, PS4, PS5 | | Tactical RPG | Sting Entertainment | Compile Heart | |
| June 7 | Bodycam | WIN | Early access | FPS | Reissad Studio | | |
| June 7 | Empires of the Undergrowth | WIN | | RTS | Slug Disco Studios | Hooded Horse | |
| June 7 | Mega Man: Dr. Wily's Revenge | NS | Port | Platformer | Minakuchi Engineering | NA/JP: Capcom; EU: Nintendo | |
| June 7 | Mega Man II | NS | Port | Platformer | Thinking Rabbit | NA/JP: Capcom; EU: Nintendo | |
| June 7 | Mega Man III | NS | Port | Platformer | Minakuchi Engineering | NA/JP: Capcom; EU: Nintendo | |
| June 7 | Mega Man IV | NS | Port | Platformer | Minakuchi Engineering | Capcom | |
| June 7 | Mega Man V | NS | Port | Platformer | Minakuchi Engineering | Capcom | |
| June 7 | Rider's Spirits | NS, PS4, PS5, XBO, XBX/S | | Racing | Masaya Games, Shinyuden | Ratalaika Games | |
| June 11 | Backpack Hero | PS4, PS5, XBO, XBX/S | | Roguelike | Jaspel | IndieArk, Different Tales | |
| June 11 | Olympics Go! Paris 2024 | iOS | | Sports, City builder | nWay | | |
| June 11 | Rocket Knight Adventures: Re-Sparked! | WIN, NS, PS4, PS5 | Compilation | Platformer | Konami Digital Entertainment, Limited Run Games | Konami Digital Entertainment | |
| June 11 | V Rising | PS5 | Port | Survival | Stunlock Studios | Level Infinite | |
| June 13 | Fruit Mountain | NS, PS4, PS5 | | Puzzle | BeXide | | |
| June 14 | Legend of Mortal | WIN | | Visual novel | Obb Studio | Obb Studio, Paras Games | |
| June 14 | Magical Drop VI | PS4, PS5, XBO, XBX/S | | Puzzle | Highball Games, Storm Trident | Forever Entertainment | |
| June 14 | Monster Hunter Stories | WIN, NS, PS4 | Port | RPG | Capcom, Marvelous | Capcom | |
| June 14 | Monster Hunter Stories 2: Wings of Ruin | PS4 | Port | RPG | Capcom, Marvelous | Capcom | |
| June 14 | Shin Megami Tensei V: Vengeance | WIN, NS, PS4, PS5, XBO, XBX/S | Rerelease | RPG | Atlus | | |
| June 14 | SunnySide | WIN | | Farming, RPG | RainyGames | Merge Games | |
| June 17 | Baten Kaitos I & II HD Remaster | WIN | Remaster, Compilation | RPG | Monolith Soft, logicalbeat | Bandai Namco Entertainment | |
| June 18 | #BLUD | WIN, NS, PS4, XBO | | Dungeon crawl | Exit 73 Studios | Humble Games | |
| June 18 | The Legend of Zelda: A Link to the Past and Four Swords | NS | Port | Action-adventure | Flagship, Nintendo R&D2 | Nintendo | |
| June 18 | Metal Slug Attack Reloaded | WIN, NS, PS4, PS5, XBO, XBX/S | Rerelease | Tower defense | SNK | | |
| June 18 | Metroid: Zero Mission | NS | Port | Action-adventure | Nintendo R&D1 | Nintendo | |
| June 18 | Perfect Dark | NS | Port | FPS, Stealth | Rare | | |
| June 18 | Still Wakes the Deep | WIN, PS5, XBX/S | | Survival horror | The Chinese Room | Secret Mode | |
| June 18 | Turok: Dinosaur Hunter | NS | Port | FPS | Iguana Entertainment | Acclaim Entertainment | |
| June 19 | Chained Together | WIN | | Platformer | Anegar Games | | |
| June 19 | Echo Generation: Midnight Edition | WIN, NS | | Adventure | Cococucumber | | |
| June 19 | Moonstone Island | NS | | Life sim, Deck building | Studio Supersoft | Raw Fury | |
| June 20 | Dicefolk | NS | | Roguelike, Strategy | LEAP Game Studios, Tiny Ghoul | Good Shepherd Entertainment | |
| June 20 | Everafter Falls | WIN, NS, PS4, PS5, XBO, XBX/S | | Farming | SquareHusky | Akupara Games | |
| June 20 | Five Nights at Freddy's: Help Wanted 2 | PS5 | Port | Survival horror | Scott Cawthon, Steel Wool Studios | | |
| June 20 | Mushoku Tensei: Jobless Reincarnation – Quest of Memories | WIN, NS, PS4, PS5 | | RPG | Lancarse | Bushiroad Games | |
| June 20 | Rusted Moss | NS, PS5, XBX/S | | Metroidvania | faxdoc, happysquared, sunnydaze | Playism | |
| June 20 | Scars of Mars | WIN, NS | | RPG | Acquire | | |
| June 21 | Elden Ring Shadow of the Erdtree | WIN, PS4, PS5, XBO, XBX/S | Expansion | Action RPG | FromSoftware | Bandai Namco Entertainment | |
| June 21 | Heaven Seeker: The Savior of This Cruel World | WIN | | Roguelike, Shoot 'em up (twin-stick) | Success | | |
| June 21 | Times & Galaxy | WIN, NS, PS5, XBO, XBX/S | | PCA | Copychaser Games | Fellow Traveller | |
| June 22 | The Elder Scrolls Online: Gold Road | PS4, PS5, XBO, XBX/S | Port | MMO, RPG | ZeniMax Online Studios | Bethesda Softworks | |
| June 24 | Pand Land (JP) | iOS, DROID | | RPG | Game Freak, WonderPlanet | WonderPlanet | |
| June 25 | Beyond Good & Evil: 20th Anniversary Edition | WIN, NS, PS4, PS5, XBO, XBX/S | Remaster | Action-adventure, Stealth | Ubisoft Montpellier | Ubisoft | |
| June 25 | CookieRun: Tower of Adventures | iOS, DROID | | Action RPG, Platformer | Devsisters | | |
| June 25 | Cozy Grove: Camp Spirit | iOS, DROID | Original | Life sim | Spry Fox | | |
| June 25 | Frogun Encore | WIN, LIN, NS, PS4, PS5, XBO, XBX/S | | Platformer | Molegato | Top Hat Studios | |
| June 25 | Graven | PS5, XBX/S | | FPS | Slipgate Ironworks | 3D Realms, Fulqrum Publishing | |
| June 25 | Riven | WIN, OSX | | Adventure, Puzzle | Cyan Worlds | | |
| June 25 | Super Monkey Ball Banana Rumble | NS | Original | Action, Platformer | Ryu Ga Gotoku Studio | Sega | |
| June 25 | Until Then | WIN, PS5 | Original | Narrative adventure | Polychroma | Modus Games | |
| June 27 | Arcana Alchemia (JP) | NS, PS4 | | Visual novel | Lump of Sugar | Entergram | |
| June 27 | Bleach: Brave Souls | XBO, XBX/S | | Brawler | KLabGames | | |
| June 27 | Exo One | PS4, PS5 | | Adventure | Exbleative | All in! Games | |
| June 27 | Iwakura Aria (JP) | NS | | Visual novel | Mages | | |
| June 27 | Luigi's Mansion 2 HD | NS | Remaster | Action-adventure | Tantalus Media | Nintendo | |
| June 27 | Natsu-Mon! 20th Century Summer Vacation (JP) | WIN | | Adventure | Millennium Kitchen, Toybox | Spike Chunsoft | |
| June 27 | NeoSprint | WIN, NS, PS4, PS5, XBO, XBX/S, ATRVCS | | Racing | Headless Chicken | Atari | |
| June 27 | Neptunia VS Titan Dogoo (JP) | NS, PS4, PS5 | | Action | Compile Heart | | |
| June 27 | Spy × Anya: Operation Memories (JP) | PS4, PS5 | | Adventure | Groove Box Japan | Bandai Namco Entertainment | |
| June 27 | Tchia | NS | | Adventure | Awacab | | |
| June 27 | Tsukihime: A Piece of Blue Glass Moon | NS, PS4 | | Visual novel | Type-Moon | Aniplex | |
| June 28 | Aimlabs | XBX/S | | FPS, TPS | State Space Labs | | |
| June 28 | Spy × Anya: Operation Memories | WIN, NS, PS4, PS5 | | Adventure | Groove Box Japan | Bandai Namco Entertainment | |

=== July–September ===
| Release date | Title | Platform(s) | Type | Genre(s) | Developer(s) | Publisher(s) | Ref. |
|---|---|---|---|---|---|---|---|
| July 2 | Final Fantasy XIV: Dawntrail | WIN, OSX, PS4, PS5, XBX/S | Expansion | MMO, RPG | Square Enix | | |
| July 2 | The First Descendant | WIN, PS4, PS5, XBO, XBX/S | | Action RPG, TPS | Nexon | | |
| July 2 | Resident Evil 7: Biohazard | OSX, iOS | Port | Survival horror | Capcom | | |
| July 4 | Cobra Triangle | NS | | Racing, Vehicular combat | Rare | Nintendo | |
| July 4 | Donkey Kong Jr. Math | NS | Port | Educational, Platformer | Nintendo R&D2 | Nintendo | |
| July 4 | Dragon Saikyou Ou Zukan: Battle Colosseum (JP) | NS | | Simulation | Nippon Columbia | | |
| July 4 | Famicom Mukashibanashi: Shin Onigashima (JP) | NS | Port | Adventure | Nintendo R&D4, Pax Softnica | Nintendo | |
| July 4 | Fate Seeker II | PS5 | | Action RPG | JSL Entertainment | Niugamer | |
| July 4 | Golf | NS | Port | Sports | Nintendo R&D2, HAL Laboratory | Nintendo | |
| July 4 | Gomoku Narabe Renju (JP) | NS | Port | Digital tabletop | Nintendo | | |
| July 4 | Mach Rider | NS | Port | Racing, Vehicular combat | HAL Laboratory | Nintendo | |
| July 4 | Mah-Jong (JP) | NS | Port | Digital tabletop | Nintendo R&D2 | Nintendo | |
| July 4 | River Tails: Stronger Together | NS | | Platformer | Kid Onion Studio | Gravity Game Arise | |
| July 4 | Run for Money: The Great Mission (JP) | NS | | Action | D3 Publisher | | |
| July 4 | Solar Jetman | NS | Port | Shoot 'em up | Zippo Games, Rare | NA: Tradewest; EU: Nintendo | |
| July 4 | Urban Champion | NS | Port | Fighting | Nintendo R&D1 | Nintendo | |
| July 4 | Zenless Zone Zero | WIN, iOS, DROID, PS5 | Original | Action RPG, Hack and slash | miHoYo | CHN: miHoYo; WW: Cognosphere | |
| July 5 | Cyber Citizen Shockman Zero | NS, PS4, PS5, XBO, XBX/S | | Action, Platformer, Brawler | Masaya Games, Shinyuden | Ratalaika Games | |
| July 5 | The Legend of Heroes: Trails Through Daybreak | WIN, NS, PS4, PS5 | | RPG | Nihon Falcom | NIS America | |
| July 5 | Machi Koro With Everyone | WIN, NS | | Digital tabletop | Grounding Inc. | | |
| July 8 | The Case of the Golden Idol | XBO, XBX/S | | Adventure, Puzzle | Color Gray Games | Playstack | |
| July 9 | Lifeless Moon | PS4, PS5, XBO, XBX/S | | Adventure, Puzzle | Stage 2 Studios | Serenity Forge | |
| July 9 | Naheulbeuk's Dungeon Master | NS, PS5, XBX/S | | Dungeon management | Artefacts Studio | Dear Villagers | |
| July 9 | Once Human | WIN | | Survival, Action | Starry Studio | | |
| July 11 | 7'scarlet (JP) | NS | | Visual novel | Otomate, Toybox | Idea Factory | |
| July 11 | Ace Combat 7: Skies Unknown Deluxe Edition | NS | Remaster | Vehicular combat (plane) | Bandai Namco Studios | Bandai Namco Entertainment | |
| July 11 | Anger Foot | WIN | | Action | Free Lives | Devolver Digital | |
| July 11 | Bleach: Brave Souls | NS | Port | Brawler | KLabGames | | |
| July 11 | Hookah Haze | WIN, NS | | Visual novel | Acquire | Aniplex | |
| July 11 | Muv-Luv Alternative Remastered | NS | Remaster | Visual novel | aNCHOR | | |
| July 11 | Muv-Luv Remastered | NS | Remaster | Visual novel | aNCHOR | | |
| July 11 | Ogre Tale | NS, PS4, XBO, XBX/S | | Brawler | Mages | Komodo | |
| July 11 | Parasol Stars | NS, PS4, PS5, XBO, XBX/S | | Platformer | Taito | ININ Games | |
| July 11 | Princess Maker 2 Regeneration | WIN, NS | Remaster | Social sim | Bliss Brain | | |
| July 12 | Densetsu no Starfy | NS | Port | Platformer | Tose | Nintendo | |
| July 12 | Densetsu no Starfy 2 | NS | Port | Platformer | Tose | Nintendo | |
| July 12 | Densetsu no Starfy 3 | NS | Port | Platformer | Tose | Nintendo | |
| July 12 | Fitness Boxing feat. Hatsune Miku (AS) | NS | Original | Fitness, Rhythm, Sports | Imagineer | | |
| July 12 | Kaku: Ancient Seal | WIN | | Action-adventure | Bingobell | | |
| July 12 | The Last Alchemist | WIN | | Simulation, Adventure | Vile Monarch | Marvelous Europe | |
| July 15 | B-Project Ryusei*Fantasia | WIN, NS | | Visual novel | Mages | PQube | |
| July 15 | Darkest Dungeon II | NS, PS4, PS5, XBO, XBX/S | Port | Dungeon crawl, Roguelike | Red Hook Studios | | |
| July 16 | Clickolding | WIN | | Adventure | Strange Scaffold | | |
| July 16 | Deliver Us the Moon | NS | | Adventure, Puzzle | KeokeN Interactive | Wired Productions | |
| July 16 | Demon Slayer: Kimetsu no Yaiba – Sweep the Board (WW) | WIN, PS4, PS5, XBO, XBX/S | | Digital tabletop | CyberConnect2 | Sega | |
| July 16 | EvilVEvil | WIN, PS5, XBX/S | | FPS | Toadman Interactive | | |
| July 16 | Flock | WIN, PS4, PS5, XBO, XBX/S | | Adventure | Hollow Ponds, Richard Hogg | Annapurna Interactive | |
| July 16 | Gestalt: Steam & Cinder | WIN | | Metroidvania, Action, Platformer | Metamorphosis Games | Fireshine Games | |
| July 16 | Hot Lap Racing | WIN, NS | | Racing | Zero Games Studio | Maximum Entertainment | |
| July 16 | Let's School | NS, PS4, PS5, XBO, XBX/S | | Business sim | Pathea Games | PM Studios | |
| July 16 | Magical Delicacy | WIN, XBO, XBX/S | | Platformer, Cooking | Skaule | Whitethorn Games | |
| July 17 | Demon Slayer: Kimetsu no Yaiba – Sweep the Board (JP) | WIN, PS4, PS5, XBO, XBX/S | | Digital tabletop | CyberConnect2 | Sega | |
| July 17 | Nobody Wants to Die | WIN, PS5, XBX/S | | Adventure | Critical Hit Games | Plaion | |
| July 17 | Powerful Pro Baseball Eikan Nine Crossroad (JP) | NS, PS4 | | Sports | Konami | | |
| July 17 | Riviera: The Promised Land – Remaster | WIN | Remaster | RPG | Sting Entertainment | | |
| July 17 | Teenage Mutant Ninja Turtles: Splintered Fate | NS | Port | Roguelike | Super Evil Megacorp | | |
| July 17 | Yeah! You Want "Those Games," Right? So Here You Go! Now, Let's See You Clear Them! 2 | WIN, NS, PS4, PS5 | | Casual | Monkeycraft | D3 Publisher | |
| July 18 | Bō: Path of the Teal Lotus | WIN, NS, PS5, XBX/S | | Platformer, Action-adventure | Squid Shock Studios | Humble Games | |
| July 18 | Dungeons of Hinterberg | WIN, XBX/S | | Action RPG | Microbird | Curve Games | |
| July 18 | Flintlock: The Siege of Dawn | WIN, PS5, XBX/S | | Action RPG | A44 | Kepler Interactive | |
| July 18 | Master Detective Archives: Rain Code+ (JP) | WIN, PS5, XBX/S | | Adventure | Too Kyo Games | Spike Chunsoft | |
| July 18 | Mistonia no Kibou: The Lost Delight (JP) | NS | | Visual novel | Otomate | Idea Factory | |
| July 18 | Nintendo World Championships: NES Edition | NS | | Action, Party, Platformer, Racing | Nintendo EPD, indieszero | Nintendo | |
| July 18 | Over Horizon X Steel Empire | NS, PS4 | | Shoot 'em up | ININ Games | | |
| July 18 | Powerful Pro Baseball 2024-2025 (JP) | NS, PS4 | | Sports | Konami Digital Entertainment | | |
| July 18 | SCHiM | WIN, OSX, LIN, NS, PS4, PS5, XBO, XBX/S | | Adventure, Puzzle, Platformer | Ewoud van der Werf, Nils Slijkerman | Extra Nice, Playism | |
| July 19 | Distance | PS4, PS5 | | Racing, Platformer | Refract | | |
| July 19 | EA Sports College Football 25 | PS5, XBX/S | Original | Sports | EA Orlando | Electronic Arts | |
| July 19 | Eggy Party | NS | | Party, Battle royale | NetEase Games | | |
| July 19 | Kunitsu-Gami: Path of the Goddess | WIN, PS4, PS5, XBO, XBX/S | | Action, Strategy | Capcom | | |
| July 20 | SNK vs. Capcom: SVC Chaos | WIN | Port | Fighting | SNK | | |
| July 22 | The New Denpa Men | NS | Original | RPG | Genius Sonority | | |
| July 22 | SNK vs. Capcom: SVC Chaos | NS, PS4 | Port | Fighting | SNK | | |
| July 23 | Conscript | WIN, NS, PS4, PS5, XBO, XBX/S | | Survival horror | Catchweight Studio | Team17 | |
| July 23 | Exophobia | WIN, NS, PS4, PS5, XBO, XBX/S | | FPS | Zarc Attack | PM Studios | |
| July 23 | F1 Manager 2024 | WIN, PS4, PS5, XBO, XBX/S | Original | Sports management | Frontier Developments | | |
| July 23 | Linkito | WIN | | Puzzle | Kimeria | Playdigious | |
| July 23 | Retro Revengers | PS4, PS5, XBO, XBX/S | | Action-adventure, Platformer | ALEX | Ratalaika Games | |
| July 23 | The Star Named EOS | WIN, NS, PS5, XBX/S | | Adventure, Puzzle | Silver Lining Studio | Playism | |
| July 24 | Ninja Slayer: Neo-Saitama in Flames | WIN, NS | | Action, Platformer | Skeleton Crew Studio | KADOKAWA Game Linkage, ABC Animation | |
| July 24 | Valley Peaks | WIN | | Simulation | Tub Club | Those Awesome Guys | |
| July 25 | 7 Days to Die | WIN, OSX, LIN, PS5, XBX/S | Full release | Survival horror | The Fun Pimps | | |
| July 25 | Arranger: A Role-Puzzling Adventure | WIN, OSX, NS, PS5, iOS, DROID | | Adventure, Puzzle | Furniture & Mattress | | |
| July 25 | Daydream: Forgotten Sorrow | NS, PS4, PS5, XBO, XBX/S | | Action-adventure | Frozen Line | Ravenage | |
| July 25 | Disgaea 7 Complete (JP) | NS, PS4, PS5 | Rerelease | Tactical RPG | Nippon Ichi Software | | |
| July 25 | Earth Defense Force 6 | WIN, PS4, PS5 | | TPS | Sandlot | D3 Publisher | |
| July 25 | Hollow Cocoon | NS | | Horror, Adventure | Nayuta Studio | Regista | |
| July 25 | Lakeview Cabin Collection | PS4, PS5, XBO, XBX/S | Port | Action, Puzzle, Horror | Roope Tamminen | Puppet Combo | |
| July 25 | The Legend of Heroes: Trails Through Daybreak II (JP) | NS | | RPG | Nihon Falcom | | |
| July 25 | Lilja and Natsuka: Painting Lies | WIN | | Visual novel | Frontwing | Bushiroad Games | |
| July 25 | Natsuzora no Monologue: Another Memory (JP) | NS | | Visual novel | Otomate, Design Factory | Idea Factory | |
| July 25 | OMEGA 6: The Triangle Stars (JP) | NS | | Visual novel, Adventure | Happymeal | City Connection | |
| July 25 | Reynatis (JP) | NS, PS4, PS5 | | Action RPG | FuRyu, Natsume Atari | FuRyu | |
| July 25 | Some Some Convenience Store | NS | | Visual novel | TALESshop | CFK | |
| July 25 | Spark the Electric Jester 3 (NA) | NS | | Action, Platformer | Feperd Games | FreakZone Games | |
| July 25 | Sylvio: Black Waters | WIN | | Horror, Adventure | Stroboskop | DreadXP | |
| July 25 | Tokyo Xanadu eX+ | NS | | Action RPG | Nihon Falcom | Aksys Games | |
| July 25 | Undying | NS | | Survival | Vanimals | Skystone Games | |
| July 26 | Ao Oni | WIN, NS | Port | Horror, RPG | Game Studio | | |
| July 26 | Frontier Hunter: Erza's Wheel of Fortune | WIN, OSX, PS5 | | Metroidvania, Action-adventure | IceSitruuna | | |
| July 26 | One Piece Odyssey: Deluxe Edition | NS | Port | RPG | ILCA | Bandai Namco Entertainment | |
| July 29 | The Case of the Golden Idol | PS4, PS5 | | Adventure, Puzzle | Color Gray Games | Playstack | |
| July 30 | Bishoujo Hanafuda Kikou: Michinoku Hitou Koimonogatari | WIN | | Digital tabletop, Adventure | FOG, SystemSoft Beta | Nippon Ichi Software | |
| July 30 | Deadlink | PS5 | | FPS | Gruby Entertainment | Crunching Koalas | |
| July 30 | Jigsaw Island: Japan Graffiti | WIN | | Puzzle | Nippon Ichi Software, SystemSoft Beta | Nippon Ichi Software | |
| July 30 | The Oni Taiji!! Mezase! Nidaime Momotaro | WIN | | Digital tabletop | Nippon Ichi Software, SystemSoft Beta | Nippon Ichi Software | |
| July 30 | SatelliTV | WIN | | Simulation | Nippon Ichi Software, SystemSoft Beta | Nippon Ichi Software | |
| July 30 | Sword and Fairy Inn 2 | PS4, PS5, XBO, XBX/S | | Life sim | Softstar, CubeGame | eastasiasoft | |
| July 31 | Deadlink | XBX/S | | FPS | Gruby Entertainment | Crunching Koalas | |
| July 31 | hololive Treasure Mountain | WIN, OSX | | Puzzle | BeXide | holo Indie | |
| July 31 | Minds Beneath Us | WIN | | Adventure | BearBone Studio | | |
| August 1 | AirportSim | XBX/S | | Simulation | MS Games, MK Studios | Iceberg Interactive | |
| August 1 | Dokapon Ikari no Tetsuken (JP) | NS | | RPG | Sting Entertainment | | |
| August 1 | Dwerve | PS5 | | Tower defense, Action RPG | Half Human Games | PM Studios | |
| August 1 | Hakuoki: Chronicles of Wind and Blossom | NS | | Visual novel | Idea Factory | eastasiasoft | |
| August 1 | Hiiro no Kakera: Tamayori Hime Kitan – Omoi Iro no Kioku (JP) | NS | | Visual novel | Otomate | Idea Factory | |
| August 1 | Kitsune Tails | WIN, LIN | | Platformer | Kitsune Games | Midboss | |
| August 1 | Mars 2120 | WIN, NS, PS4, PS5, XBO, XBX/S | | Metroidvania | QUByte Interactive | | |
| August 1 | Operation: Tango | NS | | Adventure, Puzzle | Clever Plays | | |
| August 1 | Spark the Electric Jester 3 (EU/AU) | NS | Port | Action, Platformer | Feperd Games | FreakZone Games | |
| August 1 | Star Wars: Bounty Hunter | WIN, NS, PS4, PS5, XBO, XBX/S | Remaster | Action-adventure | Aspyr | | |
| August 1 | Thalassa: Edge of the Abyss | WIN | | Adventure | Sarepta Studios | Team17 | |
| August 1 | Thank Goodness You're Here! | WIN, OSX, NS, PS4, PS5 | | Adventure | Coal Supper | Panic | |
| August 1 | Tomba! Special Edition | WIN, NS, PS5 | | Platformer | Whoopee Camp | Limited Run Games | |
| August 2 | Aero the Acro-Bat | NS, PS4, PS5, XBO, XBX/S | Port | Platformer | Shinyuden | Ratalaika Games | |
| August 2 | Closer the Distance | WIN, PS5, XBX/S | | Simulation | Osmotic Studios | Skybound Games | |
| August 2 | Fragment's Note 2+ | WIN | | Visual novel | Ullucus Heaven | | |
| August 2 | Fragment's Note+ | WIN | | Visual novel | Ullucus Heaven | | |
| August 2 | Fragment's Note+ AfterStory | WIN | | Visual novel | Ullucus Heaven | | |
| August 2 | The Mortuary Assistant | PS4, PS5, XBO, XBX/S | | Horror | DarkStone Digital | DreadXP | |
| August 2 | Valorant | PS5, XBX/S | Port | FPS, Hero shooter, Tactical shooter | Riot Games | | |
| August 2 | World of Goo 2 | WIN, NS | | Puzzle | 2D Boy, Tomorrow Corporation | Tomorrow Corporation | |
| August 6 | Bleak Faith: Forsaken | PS5, XBX/S | Port | Action RPG | Archangel Studios | Perp Games | |
| August 6 | CYGNI: All Guns Blazing | WIN, PS5, XBX/S | | Bullet hell, Scrolling shooter | KeelWorks | Konami | |
| August 6 | Eden Genesis | WIN, PS4, PS5, XBO, XBX/S | | Adventure, Platformer | Aeternum Game Studios | | |
| August 6 | Natsu-Mon! 20th Century Summer Kid | WIN, NS | | Adventure | Toybox, Millennium Kitchen | Spike Chunsoft | |
| August 6 | Pepper Grinder | PS4, PS5, XBO, XBX/S | | Action-adventure, Platformer | Ahr Ech | Devolver Digital | |
| August 6 | Volgarr the Viking II | WIN, NS, PS4, PS5, XBO, XBX/S | | Action, Platformer | Crazy Viking Studios | Digital Eclipse | |
| August 7 | Creatures of Ava | WIN, XBX/S | | Action-adventure, Monster tamer | Inverge Studios, Chibig | 11 Bit Studios | |
| August 7 | Five Nights at Freddy's: Into the Pit | WIN | Original | Adventure, Horror | Mega Cat Studios | | |
| August 7 | Hyperdimension Neptunia Re;Birth2: Sisters Generation (JP) | PS4 | | RPG | Compile Heart | | |
| August 7 | Hyperdimension Neptunia Re;Birth3: V Generation (JP) | PS4 | | RPG | Compile Heart | | |
| August 8 | Cat Quest III | WIN, NS, PS4, PS5, XBO, XBX/S | | Action RPG | The Gentlebros | Kepler Interactive | |
| August 8 | Deathbound | WIN, PS5, XBX/S | | Action RPG, Soulslike | Trialforge Studio | Tate Multimedia | |
| August 8 | Doom + Doom II | PS5, XBX/S | Compilation | FPS | id Software | Bethesda Softworks | |
| August 8 | Dungeons & Degenerate Gamblers | WIN, OSX, LIN | | Roguelike, Deck building | Purple Moss Collectors | Yogscast Games | |
| August 8 | The Exit 8 | PS4, PS5 | | Walking sim, Horror | Kotake Create | Playism | |
| August 8 | Fate/stay night Remastered | WIN, NS | Remaster | Visual novel | Type-Moon | Aniplex | |
| August 8 | Koi ni wa Amae ga Hitsuyou Desu (JP) | NS | | Visual novel | Hooksoft | Entergram | |
| August 8 | Koumajou Remilia: Scarlet Symphony | PS5 | | Action-adventure | Frontier Aja | CFK | |
| August 8 | Moonless Moon | WIN, OSX | | Visual novel, Adventure | Kazuhide Oka | Kamitsubaki Studio, Yokaze | |
| August 8 | Princess Maker 2 Regeneration | PS4, PS5 | Port | Social sim | Bliss Brain | | |
| August 8 | Rashomon of Shinjuku (JP) | NS | | Visual novel | Karin Entertainment | Altergear | |
| August 8 | Revue Starlight: El Dorado | WIN, NS | | Visual novel | Frontwing | Bushiroad Games | |
| August 8 | SteamWorld Heist II | WIN, NS, PS4, PS5, XBO, XBX/S | | TBT, Action-adventure | Image & Form | Thunderful Games | |
| August 8 | That Time I Got Reincarnated as a Slime Isekai Chronicles | WIN, NS, PS4, PS5, XBO, XBX/S | | Action RPG | ZOC, Monkeycraft | Bandai Namco Entertainment | |
| August 8 | Zombie Police: Christmas Dancing with Police Zombies | WIN, OSX | | Adventure, Visual novel | Alterciws, Lobstudio | | |
| August 9 | The Crush House | WIN | | Simulation | Nerial | Devolver Digital | |
| August 9 | Pokémon Mystery Dungeon: Red Rescue Team | NS | Port | Roguelike, Monster tamer | Chunsoft | JP: The Pokémon Company; WW: Nintendo | |
| August 12 | Shoulders of Giants: Ultimate | PS5 | | Roguelike, Action-adventure | Moving Pieces Interactive | | |
| August 13 | Guayota | WIN, NS | | Adventure, Puzzle | Team Delusion | Dear Villagers | |
| August 14 | Green Hell | PS5, XBX/S | | Survival | Creepy Jar | | |
| August 14 | Misao 2024 HD Remaster | WIN | Remaster | Horror, Adventure | Hitodenashi no Kuukan | Playism | |
| August 14 | Sam & Max: The Devil's Playhouse Remastered | WIN, NS, PS4, XBO | Remaster | Graphic adventure | Skunkape Games | | |
| August 15 | Arco | WIN, OSX, NS | | TBS, RPG | Franek, Max Cahill, Bibiki, Fáyer | Panic | |
| August 15 | Dredge: The Iron Rig | WIN, NS, PS4, PS5, XBO, XBX/S | | Fishing | Black Salt Games | Team 17 | |
| August 15 | Farewell North | WIN, OSX, NS, XBX/S | | Narrative adventure | Kyle Banks | Mooneye Studios | |
| August 15 | Hunt: Showdown 1896 | WIN, PS5, XBX/S | | FPS | Crytek | | |
| August 15 | Kena: Bridge of Spirits | XBO, XBX/S | Port | Action-adventure | Ember Lab | | |
| August 15 | Magical Delicacy | NS | | Platformer, Cooking | Skaule | Whitethorn Games | |
| August 15 | Phantom Spark | WIN, OSX, NS, PS4, PS5, XBX/S | | Racing | Ghosts | Coatsink, Thunderful Games | |
| August 15 | White Day 2: The Flower That Tells Lies Complete Edition | PS5, XBX/S | | Horror | ROOTNSTUDIO | PQube | |
| August 16 | Castaway | WIN, NS, PS4, PS5, XBO, XBX/S | | Action-adventure | Canari Games | | |
| August 16 | Elrentaros Wanderings | WIN, NS | | Action RPG | Hakama | Bushiroad | |
| August 16 | Madden NFL 25 | WIN, PS4, PS5, XBO, XBX/S | | Sports | EA Orlando | Electronic Arts | |
| August 16 | SunnySide | PS5, XBX/S | | Farming, RPG | RainyGames | Merge Games | |
| August 20 | Black Myth: Wukong | WIN, PS5 | Original | Action RPG | Game Science | | |
| August 20 | Dustborn | WIN, PS4, PS5, XBO, XBX/S | Original | Action-adventure | Red Thread Games | Quantic Dream | |
| August 20 | Guild Wars 2: Janthir Wilds | WIN | Expansion | MMO, RPG | ArenaNet | NCSoft | |
| August 20 | Predecessor | WIN, PS4, PS5, XBX/S | Full release | MOBA | Omeda Studios | | |
| August 20 | Stumble Guys | NS | | Party, Battle royale | Scopely | | |
| August 22 | Wild West Dynasty | WIN | Full release | CMS, Survival, RPG | Moon Punch Studio | Toplitz Productions | |
| August 22 | Tactical Breach Wizards | WIN | | TBT, Puzzle | Suspicious Developments | | |
| August 23 | Concord | WIN, PS5 | Original | Hero shooter | Firewalk Studios | Sony Interactive Entertainment | |
| August 23 | Harvest Moon: Home Sweet Home | iOS, DROID | Original | Farming | appci | Natsume Inc. | |
| August 26 | Fairy Tail: Dungeons | WIN | | Roguelike, Deck building | ginolabo | Kodansha | |
| August 26 | Re:Zero − Starting Life in Another World: Witch's Re:surrection (JP) | iOS, DROID | | RPG | Elemental Craft | Kadokawa Corporation | |
| August 26 | World of Warcraft: The War Within | WIN, OSX | Expansion | MMO, RPG | Blizzard Entertainment | | |
| August 27 | Castlevania Dominus Collection | WIN, NS, PS5, XBX/S | Compilation | Metroidvania, Action-adventure | Konami Digital Entertainment | | |
| August 27 | Core Keeper | WIN, LIN, PS5, XBX/S | | Sandbox, Survival, Adventure | Pugstorm | Fireshine Games | |
| August 27 | Crypt Custodian | WIN, NS, PS4, PS5, XBO, XBX/S | | Metroidvania | Kyle Thompson | Top Hat Studios | |
| August 27 | Doraemon Dorayaki Shop Story | NS | | Simulation | Kairosoft | | |
| August 27 | Goat Simulator 3 | NS | Port | Action, Simulation | Coffee Stain North | Coffee Stain Publishing | |
| August 27 | The Lord of the Rings: Return to Moria | XBX/S | Port | Survival, Action-adventure | Free Range Games | North Beach Games | |
| August 27 | Peglin | WIN, OSX, NS | Full release | Roguelike, RPG | Red Nexus Games | Red Nexus Games, BlitWorks Games | |
| August 27 | Pico Park 2 | NS | | Puzzle, Action | TECOPARK, Gemdrops | TECOPARK | |
| August 27 | Pizza Tower | NS | Port | Platformer | Tour De Pizza | | |
| August 27 | Risk of Rain 2 | PS5, XBX/S | | Roguelike, TPS | Gearbox Software | Gearbox Publishing | |
| August 27 | Snezhinka: Sentinel Girls 2 | WIN | | Shoot 'em up | hinyari9 | | |
| August 29 | Akimbot | WIN, PS5, XBX/S | | Action-adventure, Platformer | Evil Raptor | Plaion | |
| August 29 | Bloodless | WIN | | Action-adventure | Point N' Sheep | 3D Realms | |
| August 29 | Emio – The Smiling Man: Famicom Detective Club | NS | Original | Adventure, Visual novel | Nintendo EPD | Nintendo | |
| August 29 | Everlasting Flowers | WIN, NS, PS4 | | Visual novel | Sprite | RIGHTWAY | |
| August 29 | goHELLgo: Tsukiotoshiteko (JP) | WIN, NS, PS4 | | RPG | Entergram | | |
| August 29 | Gori: Cuddly Carnage | WIN, NS, PS4, PS5, XBO, XBX/S | | Hack and slash, Action-adventure | Angry Demon Studio | Wired Productions | |
| August 29 | Gundam Breaker 4 | WIN, NS, PS4, PS5 | | Action | Crafts & Meister | Bandai Namco Entertainment | |
| August 29 | KAMiBAKO: Mythology of Cube (JP) | WIN, NS, PS4, PS5 | | Puzzle, RPG | Gravity Game Arise | | |
| August 29 | Kamitsubaki City Ensemble | WIN, NS, PS5, iOS, DROID | | Rhythm | Kamitsubaki Studio, Studio Lalala, Rocket Studio | Kamitsubaki Studio | |
| August 29 | Leo: The Firefighter Cat | WIN, NS, PS4, PS5, XBO, XBX/S | | Adventure | Honikou | Maximum Entertainment | |
| August 29 | Memento Memoria: The Abandoned Neverland (JP) | NS, PS4 | | Visual novel | Asanoha Factory | Entergram | |
| August 29 | Monster Jam Showdown | WIN, NS, PS4, PS5, XBO, XBX/S | | Racing | Milestone | | |
| August 29 | My9Swallows: Topstars League (JP) | NS | | Visual novel | Otomate | Idea Factory | |
| August 29 | Nour: Play with Your Food | NS | | Art | Terrifying Jellyfish | Panic | |
| August 29 | Rhapsody: 25th Anniversary Collection (JP) | NS, PS5 | Compilation | RPG | Nippon Ichi Software | | |
| August 29 | Shadow of the Ninja Reborn | WIN, NS, PS4, PS5, XBX/S | Remake | Platformer | Tengo Project | Natsume Atari, ININ Games | |
| August 29 | Squirrel with a Gun | WIN | | Action-adventure | Dee Dee Creations | Maximum Entertainment | |
| August 29 | Valfaris: Mecha Therion | NS, PS4, PS5, XBO, XBX/S | | Shoot 'em up | Steel Mantis | Big Sugar | |
| August 29 | Vampire Survivors | PS4, PS5 | Port | Roguelike, Shoot 'em up | poncle | | |
| August 29 | Visions of Mana | WIN, PS4, PS5, XBX/S | Original | Action RPG | Ouka Studios | Square Enix | |
| August 29 | WitchSpring R | NS, PS5 | | RPG | Kiwi Walks | | |
| August 30 | Raging Loop | PS5, XBO, XBX/S | | Visual novel | Kemco | | |
| August 30 | Star Wars Outlaws | WIN, PS5, XBX/S | Original | Action-adventure | Massive Entertainment | Ubisoft | |
| August 30 | Uma Musume Pretty Derby – Party Dash | WIN, NS, PS4 | Original | Party, Action | Cygames | | |
| September 2 | Sumerian Six | WIN | | RTT, Stealth | Artificer | Devolver Digital | |
| September 3 | Bakeru | WIN, NS | | Action | Good-Feel | Spike Chunsoft | |
| September 3 | The Casting of Frank Stone | WIN, PS5, XBX/S | | Horror, Narrative adventure | Supermassive Games | Behaviour Interactive | |
| September 3 | Harry Potter: Quidditch Champions | WIN, PS4, PS5, XBO, XBX/S | Original | Sports | Unbroken Studios, Portkey Games | Warner Bros. Games | |
| September 3 | Star Trucker | WIN, XBX/S | | Vehicle sim | Monster & Monster | Raw Fury | |
| September 4 | Age of Mythology: Retold | WIN, XBX/S | | RTS | World's Edge | Xbox Game Studios | |
| September 5 | Date A Live: Ren Dystopia | WIN | | Visual novel | Compile Heart, Sting Entertainment | Idea Factory International | |
| September 5 | Fitness Boxing feat. Hatsune Miku (WW) | NS | Original | Fitness, Rhythm, Sports | Imagineer | Aksys Games | |
| September 5 | Gimmick! 2 | WIN, LIN, NS | | Platformer | Bitwave Games | Sunsoft, Clear River Games | |
| September 5 | Paper Ghost Stories: Third Eye Open | WIN, NS, PS5, XBX/S | | Adventure | Cellar Vault Games | Chorus Worldwide | |
| September 5 | Senko-san to Issho (JP) | NS, iOS, DROID | | Adventure | Five Stars Game | Kadokawa | |
| September 5 | Shogun Showdown | WIN, OSX, LIN, NS, PS4, PS5, XBO, XBX/S | Original | Roguelike, TBT | Roboatino | Goblinz Studio, Gamera Games | |
| September 5 | Touhou Danmaku Kagura: Phantasia Lost | NS | | Rhythm | Unknown X | Alliance Arts | |
| September 6 | Ace Attorney Investigations Collection | WIN, NS, PS4, XBO | Remaster, Compilation | Adventure, Visual novel | Capcom | | |
| September 6 | Aero the Acro-Bat 2 | NS, PS4, PS5, XBO, XBX/S | Port | Platformer | Shinyuden | Ratalaika Games | |
| September 6 | Astro Bot | PS5 | Original | Platformer | Team Asobi | Sony Interactive Entertainment | |
| September 6 | NBA 2K25 | WIN, NS, PS4, PS5, XBO, XBX/S | Original | Sports | Visual Concepts | 2K | |
| September 6 | SUNSOFT is Back! Retro Game Selection | WIN, NS, PS5, XBX/S | Compilation | —N/a | Sunsoft | Sunsoft, Red Art Games | |
| September 9 | Warhammer 40,000: Space Marine 2 | WIN, PS5, XBX/S | Original | TPS, Hack and slash | Saber Interactive | Focus Entertainment | |
| September 9 | Zero Hour | WIN | Full release | FPS, Tactical shooter | M7 Productions, Attrito | | |
| September 10 | The Elder Scrolls: Castles | iOS, DROID | Original | CMS | Bethesda Game Studios | Bethesda Softworks | |
| September 10 | Elsie | WIN, NS, PS5 | | Roguelike, Action, Platformer | Knight Shift Games | Playtonic Friends | |
| September 10 | Satisfactory | WIN | Full release | Factory sim, Sandbox | Coffee Stain Studios | | |
| September 10 | Vampire: The Masquerade – Reckoning of New York | WIN, NS, PS4, PS5, XBO, XBX/S | Original | Adventure, Visual novel | Draw Distance | Dear Villagers | |
| September 10 | Yars Rising | WIN, NS, PS4, PS5, XBO, XBX/S, ATRVCS | | Action-adventure | WayForward | Atari | |
| September 11 | Crossy Road Castle | NS, PS5, XBO, XBX/S | Port | Platformer | Hipster Whale | | |
| September 11 | Dragon Quest Monsters: The Dark Prince | WIN, iOS, DROID | | RPG | Tose | Square Enix | |
| September 12 | Amedama | WIN | Full release | Action-adventure | IzanagiGames, Acquire | IzanagiGames | |
| September 12 | Caravan SandWitch | WIN, NS, PS5 | | Adventure | Plane Toast | Dear Villagers | |
| September 12 | DeathSprint 66 | WIN | | Action, Racing | Sumo Newcastle | Secret Mode | |
| September 12 | Drill Core | WIN | Early access | Strategy | Hungry Couch Games | tinyBuild | |
| September 12 | Eden Genesis | NS | | Adventure, Platformer | Aeternum Game Studios | | |
| September 12 | Fabledom | NS, PS5, XBX/S | | Simulation | Grenaa Games | Dear Villagers | |
| September 12 | Grapple Dogs: Cosmic Canines | WIN, NS, XBX/S | | Platformer | Medallion Games | Super Rare Originals | |
| September 12 | Hokkaido Rensa Satsujin: Okhotsk ni Kiyu (JP) | WIN, NS | | Adventure, Visual novel | G-Mode | | |
| September 12 | Hollowbody | WIN | | Survival horror | Headware Games | | |
| September 12 | The Jackbox Naughty Pack | WIN, NS, PS4, PS5, XBO, XBX/S | | Party | Jackbox Games | | |
| September 12 | Lollipop Chainsaw RePOP (NA/EU) | WIN, NS, PS5, XBX/S | Remaster | Action-adventure, Hack and slash | Dragami Games | | |
| September 12 | Marvel vs. Capcom Fighting Collection: Arcade Classics | WIN, NS, PS4 | Compilation | Fighting | Capcom, Eighting, Iron Galaxy | Capcom | |
| September 12 | NanoApostle | WIN, NS | | Action | 18Light Game | PQube | |
| September 12 | Pico Park 2 | WIN, OSX, XBO, XBX/S | | Puzzle, Action | TECOPARK, Gemdrops | TECOPARK | |
| September 12 | Tenshi no Uta Collection (JP) | NS | | RPG | Edia | | |
| September 12 | Test Drive Unlimited Solar Crown | WIN, PS5, XBX/S | | Racing | KT Racing | Nacon | |
| September 12 | Trouble Magia (JP) | NS | | Visual novel | Otomate | Idea Factory | |
| September 12 | UFL | PS5, XBX/S | | Sports | Strikerz Inc. | | |
| September 12 | Wild Bastards | WIN, NS, PS5, XBX/S | | Strategy, FPS | Blue Manchu | Modus Games | |
| September 13 | Edge of Sanity | WIN, NS, PS4, PS5, XBO, XBX/S | | Survival horror | Vixa Games | Daedalic Entertainment | |
| September 13 | Evotinction | WIN, PS4, PS5 | | Stealth, Action | Spikewave Games | Astrolabe Games, Perp Games | |
| September 13 | Funko Fusion | WIN, PS5, XBX/S | Original | Action-adventure | 10:10 Games | | |
| September 15 | TCG Card Shop Simulator | WIN | Early access | Simulation | OPNeon Games | | |
| September 16 | Fairy Tail: Beach Volleyball Havoc | WIN | | Sports (volleyball) | tiny cactus studio, MASUDATARO, veryOK | Kodansha | |
| September 16 | Starstruck: Hands of Time | WIN | | Rhythm, Adventure | Createdelic | | |
| September 17 | Core Keeper | NS, PS4, XBO | | Sandbox, Survival, Adventure | Pugstorm | Fireshine Games | |
| September 17 | Final Fantasy XVI | WIN | Port | Action RPG | Square Enix | | |
| September 17 | The Plucky Squire | WIN, NS, PS5, XBX/S | | Action-adventure, Platformer | All Possible Futures | Devolver Digital | |
| September 17 | Star Wars Jedi: Survivor | PS4, XBO | Port | Action-adventure | Respawn Entertainment | Electronic Arts | |
| September 17 | Train Sim World 5 | WIN, PS4, PS5, XBO, XBX/S | | Vehicle sim | Dovetail Games | | |
| September 18 | Angelique (JP) | NS | Port | Dating sim, Otome, Visual novel | Ruby Party | KOEI, NEC Home Electronics | |
| September 18 | Battletoads/Double Dragon (SNES) | NS | Port | Brawler | Rare | NA: Tradewest; EU: Sony Imagesoft | |
| September 18 | Big Run | NS | Port | Racing | Jaleco | | |
| September 18 | Cosmo Gang the Puzzle | NS | Port | Puzzle | Namco | | |
| September 18 | Keylocker: Turn Based Cyberpunk Action | WIN, NS, PS5, XBX/S | | RPG | Moonana | Serenity Forge | |
| September 18 | Touhou Genso Wanderer: FORESIGHT | NS, PS4 | | RPG, Dungeon crawl | Aqua Style, ankaa studio | Phoenixx | |
| September 18 | UFO 50 | WIN | Original | Action | Mossmouth | | |
| September 19 | Broken Sword - Shadow of the Templars: Reforged | WIN, OSX, LIN, NS, PS5, XBX/S | Remaster | PCA | Revolution Software | | |
| September 19 | Dead Rising Deluxe Remaster | WIN, PS5, XBX/S | Remaster | Action-adventure | Capcom | | |
| September 19 | Death Come True | PS5 | | Interactive film, Adventure | Too Kyo Games | IzanagiGames | |
| September 19 | Death end re;Quest: Code Z (JP) | NS, PS4, PS5 | | Roguelike, RPG | Compile Heart | | |
| September 19 | Enotria: The Last Song | WIN, PS5 | | Soulslike, Action RPG | Jyamma Games | | |
| September 19 | Ginka | NS | | Visual novel | Frontwing | Bushiroad Games | |
| September 19 | God of War Ragnarök | WIN | Port | Action-adventure, Hack and slash | Santa Monica Studio | Sony Interactive Entertainment | |
| September 19 | Kamaitachi no Yoru ×3 (JP) | WIN, NS, PS4 | | Visual novel | Spike Chunsoft | | |
| November 16 | Loddlenaut | NS | Port | Cozy, adventure, simulation | Moon Lagoon | Secret Mode | |
| September 19 | Moonless Moon | NS | | Visual novel, Adventure | Kazuhide Oka | Kamitsubaki Studio, Yokaze | |
| September 19 | Wargroove 2 | XBO, XBX/S | | TBT | Robotality, Chucklefish | Chucklefish | |
| September 20 | El Paso, Elsewhere | PS5 | | TPS | Strange Scaffold | | |
| September 20 | Frostpunk 2 | WIN | | City builder, Survival | 11 Bit Studios | | |
| September 20 | Home Safety Hotline | NS, PS4, PS5, XBO, XBX/S | | Simulation, Horror | Night Signal Entertainment | Puppet Combo | |
| September 20 | Just a To the Moon Series Beach Episode | WIN, OSX, LIN | | Adventure | Freebird Games | | |
| September 20 | The Karate Kid: Street Rumble | WIN, NS, PS4, PS5, XBO, XBX/S | | Brawler | Odaclick Game Studio | GameMill Entertainment | |
| September 20 | Parking Garage Rally Circuit | WIN | Original | Racing | Walaber Entertainment | | |
| September 20 | Rainbow Sea | WIN, NS | | Adventure | Shirokurohitsuji | G-Mode | |
| September 24 | Ara: History Untold | WIN | | TBS, Grand strategy | Oxide Games | Xbox Game Studios | |
| September 24 | Bleach Soul Puzzle | iOS, DROID | | Puzzle | KLabGames | | |
| September 24 | Bloomtown: A Different Story | WIN, NS, PS4, PS5, XBO, XBX/S | | RPG | Different Sense Games, Lazy Bear Games | Twin Sails Interactive | |
| September 24 | Epic Mickey: Rebrushed | WIN, NS, PS4, PS5, XBO, XBX/S | Remake | Platformer, Action-adventure | Purple Lamp | THQ Nordic | |
| September 24 | Halls of Torment | WIN, LIN | Full release | Action, Roguelike, Bullet heaven | Chasing Carrots | | |
| September 24 | One Piece Bounty Rush | WIN | | Action | Bandai Namco, Sega | Bandai Namco Entertainment | |
| September 25 | Naruto: Ultimate Ninja Storm | iOS, DROID | Port | Fighting | CyberConnect2 | Bandai Namco Entertainment | |
| September 26 | All You Need is Help | WIN, NS, PS5, XBO, XBX/S | | Puzzle | Q-Games | | |
| September 26 | Astrea: Six-Sided Oracles | NS, PS4, PS5, XBO, XBX/S | | Roguelike, Deck building | Little Leo Games | Akupara Games | |
| September 26 | Balatro | iOS, DROID | Port | Roguelike, Deck building | LocalThunk | Playstack | |
| September 26 | C-Smash VRS: New Dimension | PS5 | | Sports | Wolf & Wood | RapidEyeMovers | |
| September 26 | Earth Defense Force: World Brothers 2 | WIN, NS, PS4, PS5 | | TPS | Yuke's | D3 Publisher | |
| September 26 | Final Fantasy Pixel Remaster | XBX/S | Remaster | RPG | Square Enix | | |
| September 26 | G.I. Joe: Wrath of Cobra | WIN | Original | Brawler | Maple Powered Games | indie.io | |
| September 26 | Go Mecha Ball | NS, PS4, PS5 | | Shoot 'em up (twin-stick) | Whale Peak Games | Super Rare Originals | |
| September 26 | Golden Lap | WIN, OSX | | Sports management | Funselektor Labs | | |
| September 26 | The Legend of Heroes: Trails Beyond the Horizon (JP) | PS4, PS5 | | RPG | Nihon Falcom | | |
| September 26 | Legend of Mana | XBX/S | Port | Action RPG | Square Enix | | |
| September 26 | The Legend of Zelda: Echoes of Wisdom | NS | Original | Action-adventure | Nintendo, Grezzo | Nintendo | |
| September 26 | Lollipop Chainsaw RePOP (AS) | WIN, NS, PS5, XBX/S | Remaster | Action-adventure, Hack and slash | Dragami Games | | |
| September 26 | Moeyo! Otome Doushi: Kayu Koigatari (JP) | NS | | Visual novel | Otomate | Idea Factory | |
| September 26 | Mouthwashing | WIN | Original | Horror (psych), Adventure | Wrong Organ | Critical Reflex | |
| September 26 | Night Slashers: Remake | WIN, NS, PS4, PS5, XBO, XBX/S | Remake | Brawler | Storm Trident | Forever Entertainment | |
| September 26 | Ravenswatch | WIN | Full release | Action, Roguelike | Passtech Games | Nacon | |
| September 26 | Shadows of Doubt | WIN, PS5, XBX/S | Full release | Stealth, Immersive sim | ColePowered Games | Fireshine Games | |
| September 26 | Trials of Mana | XBX/S | Port | Action RPG | Square Enix | | |
| September 26 | Worms Armageddon: Anniversary Edition | NS, PS4, PS5, XBO, XBX/S | Port | TBS | Team17 | | |
| September 27 | EA Sports FC 25 | WIN, NS, PS4, PS5, XBO, XBX/S | Original | Sports | EA Vancouver, EA Romania | EA Sports | |
| September 27 | Five Nights at Freddy's: Into the Pit | PS4, PS5, XBO, XBX/S | Port | Adventure, Horror | Mega Cat Studios | | |
| September 27 | Looney Tunes: Wacky World of Sports | WIN, NS, PS4, PS5, XBO, XBX/S | | Sports | Bamtang Games | GameMill Publishing | |
| September 27 | Reynatis | WIN, NS, PS4, PS5 | | Action RPG | FuRyu, Natsume Atari | NIS America | |
| September 30 | OneShot: World Machine Edition | WIN, LIN | Remaster | Adventure, Puzzle | Future Cat | Komodo | |
| September 30 | Rogue Waters | WIN | | Roguelike, Tactical RPG, TBT | Ice Code Games | Tripwire Presents | |
| September 30 | Starfield: Shattered Space | WIN, XBX/S | Expansion | Action RPG | Bethesda Game Studios | Bethesda Softworks | |
| September 30 | Zoochosis | WIN | | Survival horror | Clapperheads | | |

=== October–December ===
| Release date | Title | Platform(s) | Type | Genre(s) | Developer(s) | Publisher(s) | Ref. |
|---|---|---|---|---|---|---|---|
| October 1 | HorrorVale | WIN | Original | Horror, RPG | BatWorks Software | | |
| October 1 | Master Detective Archives: Rain Code+ | WIN, PS5, XBX/S | Port | Adventure | Too Kyo Games | Spike Chunsoft | |
| October 1 | Predator: Hunting Grounds | PS5, XBX/S | Port | FPS, TPS | IllFonic | | |
| October 1 | Throne and Liberty | WIN, PS5, XBX/S | | MMO, RPG | NCSoft | Amazon Games | |
| October 3 | Cryptmaster | PS4, PS5, XBO, XBX/S | | Dungeon crawl | Akupara Games | | |
| October 3 | Honey Vibes (JP) | NS | | Visual novel | Otomate | Idea Factory | |
| October 3 | I*CHU: Chibi Edition | NS | | Visual novel, Rhythm | OperaHouse | PQube | |
| October 3 | Kill Knight | WIN, NS, PS4, PS5, XBO, XBX/S | | Action, Scrolling shooter (isometric) | PlaySide Studios | | |
| October 3 | Meiji Tokyo Renka: Full Moon | WIN, NS | | Visual novel | Mages | Dramatic Create | |
| October 3 | Parcel Corps | WIN, PS5, XBX/S | | Action-adventure | Billy Goat Entertainment | Secret Mode | |
| October 3 | Refind Self: The Personality Test Game | NS | | Adventure | Lizardry | Playism | |
| October 3 | Victory Heat Rally | WIN, iOS, DROID | | Racing | Skydevilpalm | Playtonic Friends | |
| October 4 | Kinki Spiritual Affairs Bureau | WIN | Original | Horror, Action | Noto Muteki | | |
| October 4 | Liar's Bar | WIN | | Party, Digital tabletop | Curve Animation | | |
| October 4 | Skautfold: Into the Fray | NS, PS4, PS5, XBO, XBX/S | | Action-adventure | Pugware | Red Art Games | |
| October 4 | SpongeBob SquarePants: The Patrick Star Game | WIN, NS, PS4, PS5, XBO, XBX/S | Original | Adventure | PHL Collective | Outright Games | |
| October 4 | Sword Art Online: Fractured Daydream | WIN, NS, PS5, XBX/S | | Action | Dimps | Bandai Namco Entertainment | |
| October 4 | Until Dawn | WIN, PS5 | Remake | Survival horror, Interactive drama | Ballistic Moon | Sony Interactive Entertainment | |
| October 4 | Zero the Kamikaze Squirrel | NS, PS4, PS5, XBO, XBX/S | Port | Platformer | Shinyuden | Ratalaika Games | |
| October 7 | Death Come True | XBO | | Interactive film, Adventure | Too Kyo Games | IzanagiGames | |
| October 7 | Disney Pixel RPG | iOS, DROID | | RPG | GungHo Online Entertainment | | |
| October 7 | Kill The Crows | NS | | Arena shooter | 5minlab | | |
| October 7 | Kind Words 2 (lofi city pop) | WIN, OSX, LIN | | Casual, Social sim | Popcannibal | | |
| October 7 | Phoenix Springs | WIN, OSX, LIN | | PCA | Calligram Studio | | |
| October 8 | Diablo IV: Vessel of Hatred | WIN, PS4, PS5, XBO, XBX/S | Expansion | Action RPG, Hack and slash, Dungeon crawl | Blizzard Entertainment | | |
| October 8 | Silent Hill 2 | WIN, PS5 | Remake | Survival horror | Bloober Team | Konami | |
| October 8 | To the Moon | PS5, XBX/S | | Adventure | Freebird Games | Serenity Forge | |
| October 9 | PopSlinger Vol. 2: Loveless | WIN, NS | | Shoot 'em up | Funky Can Creative | | |
| October 10 | Amanda the Adventurer | PS4, PS5, XBO, XBX/S | Port | Horror | MANGLEDmaw Games | DreadXP | |
| October 10 | Amber Isle | WIN | | Business sim, Social sim | Ambertail Games | Team17 | |
| October 10 | Backyard Baseball '97 | WIN | | Sports | Mega Cat Studios | Playground Productions | |
| October 10 | Bloodless | NS | | Action-adventure | Point N' Sheep | 3D Realms | |
| October 10 | Dungeon Antiqua | WIN, OSX | Original | Dungeon crawl, RPG | Shiromofu Factory | | |
| October 10 | Faith: The Unholy Trinity | NS | Port | Survival horror | Airdorf Games | New Blood Interactive | |
| October 10 | The Fox's Way Home | WIN, OSX | | Adventure | BeXide | | |
| October 10 | Last Time I Saw You | WIN, NS, PS5, XBX/S | | Narrative adventure | Maboroshi Artworks | Chorus Worldwide | |
| October 10 | Sky Oceans: Wings for Hire | WIN, NS, PS5, XBX/S | | RPG | Octeto Studios | PQube | |
| October 10 | UFO Robot Grendizer: The Feast of the Wolves | NS | | Action-adventure, Brawler | Endroad | Microids | |
| October 11 | Dragon Ball: Sparking! Zero | WIN, PS5, XBX/S | Original | Action, Fighting | Spike Chunsoft | Bandai Namco Entertainment | |
| October 11 | Europa | WIN, NS | | Action-adventure | Novadust Entertainment | Future Friends Games | |
| October 11 | F-Zero Climax | NS | Port | Racing | Suzak Inc. | Nintendo | |
| October 11 | F-Zero: GP Legend | NS | Port | Racing | Suzak Inc. | Nintendo | |
| October 11 | Metaphor: ReFantazio | WIN, PS4, PS5, XBX/S | Original | RPG | Studio Zero | Atlus | |
| October 11 | Starship Troopers: Extermination | WIN, PS5, XBX/S | Full release | FPS | Offworld Industries | Knights Peak | |
| October 11 | Transformers: Galactic Trials | WIN, NS, PS4, PS5, XBO, XBX/S | Original | Racing | 3DClouds | Outright Games | |
| October 11 | Undisputed | WIN, PS5, XBX/S | | Sports | Steel City Interactive | Deep Silver | |
| October 11 | Wingspan | PS4, PS5 | | Digital tabletop | Monster Couch | Monster Couch, Stonemaier Games | |
| October 12 | Webfishing | WIN | | Fishing | lamedeveloper | | |
| October 14 | Burggeist | WIN | | Action, Strategy | Ghrian Studio | Kodansha | |
| October 15 | 9 R.I.P. | NS | | Visual novel | Otomate | Idea Factory International | |
| October 15 | Darksiders II: Deathinitive Edition | PS5, XBX/S | Remaster | Action RPG, Hack and slash | Gunfire Games | THQ Nordic | |
| October 15 | Drova: Forsaken Kin | WIN, LIN, NS, PS4, PS5, XBO, XBX/S | | Action RPG | Just2D | Deck13 | |
| October 15 | Just Dance 2025 Edition | NS, PS5, XBX/S | Original | Rhythm | Ubisoft Paris | Ubisoft | |
| October 15 | Neva | WIN, OSX, NS, PS4, PS5, XBX/S | | Puzzle-platformer, Action-adventure | Nomada Studio | Devolver Digital | |
| October 15 | New World: Aeternum | WIN, PS5, XBX/S | | MMO, RPG | Amazon Games Orange County | Amazon Games | |
| October 15 | Nikoderiko: The Magical World | NS, PS5, XBX/S | | Platformer | Vea Games | Knights Peak | |
| October 15 | Squirrel with a Gun | PS5, XBX/S | | Action-adventure | Dee Dee Creations | Maximum Entertainment | |
| October 15 | Wizardry Variants Daphne | iOS, DROID | | RPG | Studio 2PRO | Drecom | |
| October 16 | 8-Bit Adventures 2 | NS, PS4, PS5, XBO, XBX/S | | RPG | Critical Games | | |
| October 16 | Crow Country | NS, PS4 | | Survival horror | SFB Games | | |
| October 16 | Indus Battle Royale | iOS, DROID | | Battle royale | SuperGaming | | |
| October 16 | MechWarrior 5: Clans | WIN, PS5, XBX/S | | Action, FPS | Piranha Games | | |
| October 17 | Age of Empires Mobile | iOS, DROID | | RTS | TiMi Studios, World's Edge | Xbox Game Studios | |
| October 17 | Amelia's Garden | NS | | Puzzle | RedDeerGames | | |
| October 17 | Animal Well | XBX/S | Port | Metroidvania, Puzzle | Shared Memory | Bigmode | |
| October 17 | Arsene Lupin: Once a Thief | WIN, NS, PS4, PS5, XBO, XBX/S | | Adventure | Blazing Griffin | Microids | |
| October 17 | Astlibra Gaiden: The Cave of Phantom Mist | NS | | Action RPG | KEIZO | WhisperGames | |
| October 17 | Blazing Strike | WIN, NS, PS4, PS5 | | Fighting | RareBreed Makes Games | Aksys Games | |
| October 17 | Eternights | NS | | Dating sim, Action RPG | Studio Sai | | |
| October 17 | Killing Time: Resurrected | WIN, NS, PS4, PS5, XBO, XBX/S | Remaster | FPS | Nightdive Studios | | |
| October 17 | Kimi ga Nozomu Eien: Enhanced Edition | WIN | | Visual novel | aNCHOR | | |
| October 17 | Professional Baseball Spirits 2024-2025 (JP) | WIN, PS5 | | Sports | Konami Digital Entertainment | | |
| October 17 | A Quiet Place: The Road Ahead | WIN, PS5, XBX/S | | Survival horror | Stormind Games | Saber Interactive | |
| October 17 | Recolit | NS | | Puzzle, Adventure | Image Labo | Image Labo, Yokaze | |
| October 17 | Super Mario Party Jamboree | NS | Original | Party | Nintendo Cube | Nintendo | |
| October 17 | Tinkertown | XBO, XBX/S | | Sandbox, Adventure | Headup Games | | |
| October 17 | Tintin Reporter – Cigars of the Pharaoh | NS | | Adventure | Pendulo Studios | Microids | |
| October 18 | RetroRealms: Ash vs Evil Dead | WIN, NS, PS4, PS5, XBO, XBX/S | | Action, Platformer | WayForward | Boss Team Games | |
| October 18 | RetroRealms: Halloween | WIN, NS, PS4, PS5, XBO, XBX/S | | Action, Platformer | WayForward | Boss Team Games | |
| October 18 | Teenage Mutant Ninja Turtles: Mutants Unleashed | WIN, NS, PS4, PS5, XBO, XBX/S | Original | Platformer, Brawler | aheartfulofgames | Outright Games | |
| October 18 | Unknown 9: Awakening | WIN, PS4, PS5, XBO, XBX/S | | Action-adventure | Reflector Entertainment | Bandai Namco Entertainment | |
| October 18 | Valkyrie of Phantasm | WIN | Full release | Action | Areazero | Playism | |
| October 21 | Batman: Arkham Shadow | Quest | Original | Action-adventure | Camouflaj | Oculus Studios | |
| October 21 | Wayfinder | WIN, PS5 | Full release | Action RPG | Airship Syndicate | | |
| October 22 | Amanda the Adventurer 2 | WIN | Original | Horror | MANGLEDmaw Games | DreadXP | |
| October 22 | AWAKEN: Astral Blade | WIN, PS5 | | Metroidvania | Dark Pigeon Games | ESDigital Games | |
| October 22 | Fae Farm | PS4, PS5, XBO, XBX/S | | Farming, RPG | Phoenix Labs | | |
| October 22 | Fear the Spotlight | WIN, OSX, LIN, NS, PS4, PS5, XBO, XBX/S | | Horror, Puzzle, Action | Cozy Game Pals | Blumhouse Games | |
| October 22 | Kong: Survivor Instinct | WIN, PS5, XBX/S | | Action-adventure | 7Levels | | |
| October 22 | Potionomics: Masterwork Edition | NS, PS5, XBX/S | Port | Simulation | Voracious Games | Xseed Games, Marvelous Europe | |
| October 22 | Wildermyth | NS, PS4, PS5, XBO, XBX/S | | Tactical RPG | Worldwalker Games | Auroch Digital | |
| October 23 | BAN: The Prologue of GUCHA GUCHA | WIN | | Horror, Adventure | Ichimatsu Suzuka | Kodansha | |
| October 23 | Fate Seeker II | XBO, XBX/S | | Action RPG | JSL Entertainment | Niugamer | |
| October 23 | Rivals of Aether II | WIN | Original | Platform fighter | Aether Studios | Aether Studios, Offbrand Games | |
| October 23 | SINce Memories: Off the Starry Sky | WIN, NS, PS4 | | Visual novel | Mages | PQube | |
| October 23 | While We Wait Here | WIN, NS, PS4, PS5, XBO, XBX/S | | Horror, Simulation | Bad Vices Games | | |
| October 23 | Wilmot Works It Out | WIN, OSX | | Puzzle | Hollow Ponds, Richard Hogg | Finji | |
| October 24 | The Bridge Curse 2: The Extrication | NS, PS4, PS5, XBO, XBX/S | | Horror | Softstar | PQube | |
| October 24 | The Children of Clay | WIN, LIN | Original | Horror, PCA | Balazs Ronyai | | |
| October 24 | Card-en-Ciel | WIN, NS, PS4, PS5, XBO, XBX/S | | Deck building, RPG | Inti Creates | | |
| October 24 | Flint: Treasure of Oblivion | WIN, PS5, XBX/S | | Tactical RPG | Savage Level | Microids | |
| October 24 | Goat Simulator 3 | PS4, XBO | Port | Action, Simulation | Coffee Stain North | Coffee Stain Publishing | |
| October 24 | The Jackbox Survey Scramble | WIN, NS, PS4, PS5, XBO, XBX/S | | Party | Jackbox Games | | |
| October 24 | Jewelry Hearts Academia: We Will Wing Wonder World (JP) | NS, PS4 | | Visual novel | Cabbage Soft | Entergram | |
| October 24 | Rabi-Ribi Platinum Edition | NS, PS4 | | Action-adventure, Platformer | CreSpirit, GemaYue | Justdan International, Sekai Project | |
| October 24 | Romance of the Three Kingdoms 8 Remake | WIN, NS, PS4, PS5 | Remake | TBS | Kou Shibusawa | Koei Tecmo | |
| October 24 | Romancing SaGa 2: Revenge of the Seven | WIN, NS, PS4, PS5 | | RPG | Square Enix, xeen Inc. | Square Enix | |
| October 24 | Shin chan: Shiro and the Coal Town | WIN, NS | | Adventure | h.a.n.d. | Neos | |
| October 24 | Slay the Princess — The Pristine Cut | WIN, OSX, LIN, NS, PS4, PS5, XBO, XBX/S | Port, Expansion | Visual novel, Horror (psych), Dating sim | Black Tabby Games | Serenity Forge | |
| October 24 | The Smurfs: Dreams | WIN, NS, PS4, PS5, XBO, XBX/S | | Adventure, Platformer | Ocellus Services | Microids | |
| October 24 | Starbound | XBO | | Action-adventure | Chucklefish | | |
| October 24 | Telebbit | WIN, NS, PS5, XBX/S | | Action, Platformer | IKINAGAMES | HYPER REAL | |
| October 24 | Voidwrought | WIN, NS | | Metroidvania, Action, Platformer | Powersnake | Kwalee | |
| October 24 | Yakuza Kiwami | NS | Port | Action-adventure | Ryu Ga Gotoku Studio | Sega | |
| October 25 | Atari 50: The Anniversary Celebration Expanded Edition | WIN, NS, PS4, PS5, XBO, XBX/S | Rerelease | —N/a | Digital Eclipse | Atari | |
| October 25 | Banjo-Tooie | NS | Port | Platformer, Action-adventure | Rare | Nintendo | |
| October 25 | Call of Duty: Black Ops 6 | WIN, PS4, PS5, XBO, XBX/S | Original | FPS | Treyarch, Raven Software | Activision | |
| October 25 | The Coma 2B: Catacomb | WIN, NS, PS4, PS5, XBO, XBX/S | | Survival horror | Dvora Studio | Headup Games | |
| October 25 | Sonic X Shadow Generations | WIN, NS, PS4, PS5, XBO, XBX/S | Remaster, Expansion | Action, Platformer | Sonic Team | Sega | |
| October 25 | Ys X: Nordics | WIN, NS, PS4, PS5 | | Action RPG | Nihon Falcom | NIS America | |
| October 28 | Fruitbus | WIN | | Adventure, Cooking | Krillbite Studio | | |
| October 28 | Reel Fishing: Days of Summer | WIN, NS, PS4, PS5, XBO, XBX/S | | Fishing, Adventure | Natsume Inc. | | |
| October 28 | Starseed: Asnia Trigger | iOS, DROID | | Action RPG | JoyCity | Com2uS | |
| October 29 | Clock Tower Rewind (WW) | WIN, NS, PS4, PS5, XBO, XBX/S | | Survival horror, PCA | WayForward, Limited Run Games | | |
| October 29 | Life Is Strange: Double Exposure | WIN, PS5, XBX/S | Original | Adventure | Deck Nine | Square Enix | |
| October 29 | Neptunia Game Maker R:Evolution | XBX/S | Port | RPG | Compile Heart | Idea Factory International | |
| October 29 | Red Dead Redemption | WIN | Port | Action-adventure | Rockstar San Diego, Double Eleven | Rockstar Games | |
| October 29 | Shadow Man | NS | Port | Action-adventure | Acclaim Studios Teesside | Acclaim Entertainment | |
| October 29 | Turok 2: Seeds of Evil | NS | Port | FPS | Iguana Entertainment | Acclaim Entertainment | |
| October 29 | Valis: The Fantasm Soldier Collection | WIN | | Action, Platformer | Edia | | |
| October 30 | Pokémon Trading Card Game Pocket | iOS, DROID | Original | DCCG | Creatures, DeNA | The Pokémon Company | |
| October 31 | The Bunny Graveyard | NS | | PCA, Horror, Puzzle | Pichón Games | | |
| October 31 | Carrion | iOS, DROID | | Horror | Phobia Game Studio | Devolver Digital | |
| October 31 | Clock Tower Rewind (JP) | NS, PS4, PS5 | | Survival horror, PCA | WayForward, Limited Run Games | | |
| October 31 | Dragon Age: The Veilguard | WIN, PS5, XBX/S | Original | Action RPG | BioWare | Electronic Arts | |
| October 31 | Five Nights at Freddy's: Into the Pit | NS | Port | Adventure, Horror | Mega Cat Studios | | |
| October 31 | Horizon Zero Dawn Remastered | WIN, PS5 | Remaster | Action RPG | Guerrilla Games | Sony Interactive Entertainment | |
| October 31 | The Quintessential Quintuplets: Gotopazu Story 2nd (JP) | NS, PS4 | | Visual novel | Mages | | |
| October 31 | Raiden NOVA | WIN, NS, PS4, PS5 | | Shoot 'em up | MOSS | MOSS, UFO Interactive | |
| October 31 | [REDACTED] | WIN, PS5, XBX/S | | Action, Roguelike | Striking Distance Studios | Krafton | |
| October 31 | S.T.A.L.K.E.R.: Legends of the Zone Trilogy | NS | Port | FPS, Survival horror | GSC Game World | | |
| October 31 | Shadows of the Damned: Hella Remastered | WIN, NS, PS4, PS5, XBO, XBX/S | Remaster | Action-adventure, TPS | Grasshopper Manufacture | | |
| October 31 | Totally Spies! Cyber Mission | WIN, NS, PS4, PS5, XBO, XBX/S | | Action-adventure | Balio Studio | Microids | |
| October 31 | Wolf Fang / Skull Fang Saturn Tribute Boosted (JP) | WIN, NS, PS4, PS5, XBX/S | | Shoot 'em up | City Connection | | |
| November 1 | Aero the Acro-Bat: Rascal Rival Revenge | NS, PS4, PS5, XBO, XBX/S | | Platformer | Shinyuden | Ratalaika Games | |
| November 1 | Farmagia | WIN, NS, PS5 | | Farming, Action RPG | Marvelous | Marvelous, Marvelous Europe, Marvelous USA | |
| November 4 | Tinkertown | NS | | Sandbox, Adventure | Headup Games | | |
| November 5 | Death Note: Killer Within | WIN, PS4, PS5 | | Social deduction | Grounding Inc. | Bandai Namco Entertainment | |
| November 5 | Metal Slug Tactics | WIN, NS, PS4, PS5, XBO, XBX/S | | TBT | Leikir Studio | Dotemu | |
| November 6 | Planet Coaster 2 | WIN, PS5, XBX/S | | CMS | Frontier Developments | | |
| November 6 | Teenage Mutant Ninja Turtles: Splintered Fate | WIN | Port | Roguelike | Super Evil Megacorp | | |
| November 7 | Ark of Charon | WIN | Full release | Strategy, Tower defense | Sunsoft, angoo | Sunsoft | |
| November 7 | Battle Spirits CrossOver (JP) | WIN, NS, PS5 | | DCCG | FuRyu | | |
| November 7 | Broken Sword - Shadow of the Templars: Reforged | NS | Port | PCA | Revolution Software | | |
| November 7 | Chicken Police: Into the HIVE! | WIN, OSX | | PCA | The Wild Gentlemen | Joystick Ventures | |
| November 7 | Death Stranding Director's Cut | XBX/S | Port | Action | Kojima Productions | 505 Games | |
| November 7 | Empire of the Ants | WIN, PS5, XBX/S | | Adventure, RTS | Tower Five | Microids | |
| November 7 | Goat Simulator - Remastered | WIN, PS5, XBX/S | Remaster | Simulation, Action | Coffee Stain Studios, Coffee Stain North, Deep Silver Fishlabs | Coffee Stain Publishing | |
| November 7 | Mario & Luigi: Brothership | NS | Original | RPG | Acquire | Nintendo | |
| November 7 | Phantom Brave: The Hermuda Triangle Remastered | PS5 | Remaster | Tactical RPG | Nippon Ichi Software | NIS America | |
| November 7 | River City Saga: Three Kingdoms Next | WIN, NS, PS4 | | Brawler | APlus Games, R-Force Entertainment | Arc System Works | |
| November 7 | Spirit Mancer | WIN, NS, PS5 | | Hack and slash, Deck building | Sunny Syrup Studio | Dear Villagers | |
| November 7 | Taiko no Tatsujin: Rhythm Festival | WIN, PS5, XBX/S | | Rhythm | Bandai Namco Studios | Bandai Namco Entertainment | |
| November 7 | Tokyo Revengers: Last Mission (JP) | WIN, iOS, DROID | | Action RPG | Victor Entertainment | | |
| November 7 | Virche Evermore: -EpiC:lycoris- | NS | | Visual novel | HYDE | Aksys Games | |
| November 8 | Harry Potter: Quidditch Champions | NS | Port | Sports | Unbroken Studios, Portkey Games | Warner Bros. Games | |
| November 8 | Slitterhead | WIN, PS4, PS5, XBX/S | | Action-adventure | Bokeh Game Studio | | |
| November 12 | Farming Simulator 25 | WIN, OSX, PS5, XBX/S | Original | Simulation | Giants Software | | |
| November 12 | Neo Harbor Rescue Squad | WIN, PS4, PS5 | | Adventure, Simulation | BancyCo | | |
| November 12 | The Rise of the Golden Idol | WIN, OSX, NS, PS4, PS5, XBO, XBX/S, iOS, DROID | Original | Puzzle, Adventure | Color Gray Games | Playstack | |
| November 12 | Songs of Conquest | PS5, XBX/S | | TBS | Lavapotion | Coffee Stain Publishing | |
| November 12 | Tetris Forever | WIN, NS, PS4, PS5, XBO, XBX/S | Compilation | Puzzle | Digital Eclipse | | |
| November 13 | I Am Future | WIN | Full release | Survival, Simulation | Mandragora | tinyBuild | |
| November 13 | Mind Over Magnet | WIN, OSX | | Puzzle-platformer | Game Maker's Toolkit | | |
| November 13 | Songs of Silence | WIN, PS5, XBX/S | Full release | TBS | Chimera Entertainment | | |
| November 13 | Warcraft I: Remastered | WIN | Remaster | RTS | Blizzard Entertainment | | |
| November 13 | Warcraft II: Remastered | WIN | Remaster | RTS | Blizzard Entertainment | | |
| November 14 | 420BLAZEIT 2: GAME OF THE YEAR (Note: Full title: 420BLAZEIT 2: GAME OF THE YEAR -=Dank Dreams and Goated Memes=- [#wow/11 Like and Subscribe] Poggerz Edition) | WIN | | FPS | Normal Wholesome Games | | |
| November 14 | Beyblade X: Xone | WIN, NS | | Action | Groove Box Japan | FuRyu | |
| November 14 | Debut Project: Cooking Cafe | WIN, NS | | Cooking | D3 Publisher | | |
| November 14 | Dragon Quest III HD-2D Remake | WIN, NS, PS5, XBX/S | Remake | RPG | Artdink, Square Enix | Square Enix | |
| November 14 | Five Nights at Freddy's: Help Wanted 2 | NS | Port | Survival horror | Scott Cawthon, Steel Wool Studios | | |
| November 14 | Irem Collection Volume 2 | NS, PS4, PS5, XBO, XBX/S | Compilation | Shoot 'em up | ININ Games, Irem, Tozai Games | ININ Games | |
| November 14 | Lego Horizon Adventures | WIN, NS, PS5 | Original | Action-adventure | Guerrilla Games, Studio Gobo | Sony Interactive Entertainment, Solutions 2 GO | |
| November 14 | Little Big Adventure: Twinsen's Quest | WIN, NS, PS4, PS5, XBO, XBX/S | | Action-adventure | [2.21] | Microids | |
| November 14 | Mindcop | WIN, NS, PS5 | | Adventure | Andre Gareis | Dear Villagers | |
| November 14 | Miniatures | WIN, OSX, LIN, NS, iOS | | PCA | Other Tales Interactive | | |
| November 14 | Ninja Kamui: Shinobi Origins | PS4 | | Action | G.rev | Rainmaker Productions | |
| November 14 | Petit Island | WIN, NS, PS5, XBX/S | | Adventure | Xelo Games | Soedesco | |
| November 14 | Rage of the Dragons NEO | WIN, NS, PS4, PS5, XBO, XBX/S | | Fighting | QUByte Interactive | QUByte Interactive, Piko Interactive, Bleem! | |
| November 14 | Sorry We're Closed | WIN | | Survival horror | à la mode games | Akupara Games | |
| November 14 | VED | WIN, NS, PS4, PS5, XBO, XBX/S | | RPG | Karaclan | Fulqrum Publishing | |
| November 15 | Funko Fusion | NS, PS4 | Port | Action-adventure | 10:10 Games | | |
| November 15 | Goblin Slayer Another Adventurer: Nightmare Feast | WIN, NS | | Tactical RPG | Apollosoft, Mebius | Red Art Games | |
| November 15 | Heaven Burns Red | WIN, iOS, DROID | | RPG | Key, WFS | Yostar | |
| November 18 | Maid Cafe on Electric Street | WIN | | Adventure | Adventurer's Tavern | Playism | |
| November 19 | Life Is Strange: Double Exposure | NS | Port | Adventure | Deck Nine | Square Enix | |
| November 19 | Microsoft Flight Simulator 2024 | WIN, XBX/S | Original | Vehicle sim (plane) | Asobo Studios | Xbox Game Studios | |
| November 19 | MySims: Cozy Bundle | NS | Compilation | Life sim | Maxis | Electronic Arts | |
| November 19 | Stray | NS | Port | Adventure | BlueTwelve Studio | Annapurna Interactive | |
| November 19 | Touhou Spell Carnival | NS, PS4, PS5 | | Tactical RPG | Sting Entertainment | Idea Factory International | |
| November 20 | Genshin Impact | XBX/S | Port | Action RPG | MiHoYo | | |
| November 20 | Luma Island | WIN | Original | Life sim | Feel Free Games | | |
| November 20 | S.T.A.L.K.E.R. 2: Heart of Chornobyl | WIN, XBX/S | Original | FPS, Survival horror | GSC Game World | | |
| November 21 | Amedama | NS, PS5, XBX/S | | Action-adventure | IzanagiGames, Acquire | IzanagiGames | |
| November 21 | Disney Music Parade: Encore (JP) | NS | | Action, Rhythm | Imagineer | | |
| November 21 | Divine Dynamo Flamefrit | WIN, NS, PS4, PS5, XBO, XBX/S | | Action | Inti Creates | | |
| November 21 | G.I. Joe: Wrath of Cobra | NS, PS5, XBX/S | Port | Brawler | Maple Powered Games | indie.io | |
| November 21 | Highspeed Étoile Paddock Stories (JP) | NS | | Visual novel | Entergram | | |
| November 21 | Loco Motive | WIN, NS | | PCA | Robust Games | Chucklefish | |
| November 21 | Prison Princess: Trapped Allure | WIN, NS | | Adventure | qureate | | |
| November 21 | Shinjuku Soumei | NS | | Visual novel | G-Mode, Plus81 | G-Mode | |
| November 21 | Strinova | WIN | | TPS, Hero shooter | iDreamSky | | |
| November 21 | Zero to Dance Hero | NS | | Fitness, Rhythm | SmileBoom | Aksys Games | |
| November 22 | Biomorph | PS5 | Port | Soulslike, Metroidvania | Lucid Dreams Studio | | |
| November 22 | Donkey Kong Land | NS | Port | Platformer | Rare | Nintendo | |
| November 25 | Void Crew | WIN | Full release | Action | Hutlihut Games | Focus Entertainment | |
| November 25 | Wild Country | WIN, NS, XBX/S | | Deck building, City builder, Strategy | Lost Native | | |
| November 26 | Critter Cafe | WIN, NS | | CMS, Life sim | Sumo Newcastle | Secret Mode | |
| November 26 | Donkey Kong Land 2 | NS | Port | Platformer | Rare | Nintendo | |
| November 26 | Gladio Mori | WIN | Early access | Fighting | Plebian Studio | Bonus Stage Publishing | |
| November 26 | Neon Blood | WIN, NS, PS4, PS5, XBO, XBX/S | | RPG | ChaoticBrain Studio | Meridiem Games | |
| November 26 | Nine Sols | NS, PS4, PS5, XBO, XBX/S | | Action, Platformer | Red Candle Games | | |
| November 27 | Backyard Soccer '98 | WIN | | Sports | Mega Cat Studios | Playground Productions | |
| November 27 | Emberstoria (JP) | WIN, iOS, DROID | | Tactical RPG | Square Enix | | |
| November 27 | Mercs | NS | Port | Run and gun | Sega | | |
| November 27 | ToeJam & Earl in Panic on Funkotron | NS | Port | Platformer | Johnson Voorsanger Productions | Sega | |
| November 27 | Vectorman | NS | Port | Action, Platformer | BlueSky Software | Sega | |
| November 28 | Amatsu Sora ni Saku (JP) | NS, PS4 | | Visual novel | studio aila | Entergram | |
| November 28 | Mado Monogatari: Fia and the Wondrous Academy (JP) | NS, PS4, PS5 | | Dungeon crawl, RPG | Sting Entertainment, D4 Enterprise | Compile Heart | |
| November 28 | MXGP 24 The Official Game | WIN, PS5, XBX/S | | Racing | KT Racing | Nacon | |
| November 28 | Ninja Kamui: Shinobi Origins | WIN | | Action | G.rev | Rainmaker Productions | |
| November 28 | Platform 8 | NS, PS4, PS5 | | Horror, Adventure | Kotake Create | Playism | |
| November 28 | Ravenswatch | PS4, PS5, XBO, XBX/S | | Action, Roguelike | Passtech Games | Nacon | |
| November 28 | Rent-A-Girlfriend: The Horizon and the Girl in the Swimsuit (JP) | NS, PS4 | | Visual novel | Mages | | |
| November 28 | RIKI 8Bit GAME Collection | NS | Compilation | Action, Shoot 'em up, Rhythm | City Connection | JP: City Connection; WW: Clear River Games | |
| November 28 | Riviera: The Promised Land – Remaster | NS | Port | RPG | Sting Entertainment | | |
| November 28 | Snow Bros. Wonderland | WIN, NS, PS4, PS5 | | Action | Tatsujin | Clear River Games | |
| November 28 | TAITO Milestones 3 (JP) | NS | Compilation | —N/a | Hamster Corporation | Taito | |
| November 28 | Tokyo Psychodemic | WIN, NS, PS4, PS5 | | Adventure | Gravity Game Arise | | |
| December 2 | Lollipop Chainsaw RePOP | PS4, XBO | Port | Action-adventure, Hack and slash | Dragami Games | | |
| December 3 | Animal Crossing: Pocket Camp Complete | iOS, DROID | Rerelease | Social sim | Nintendo EPD, Nintendo Cube | Nintendo | |
| December 3 | Antonblast | WIN | Original | Action, Platformer | Summitsphere | | |
| December 3 | Girls' Frontline 2: Exilium | WIN, iOS, DROID | | Tactical RPG | MICA Team | Sunborn, Darkwinter, HAOPlay | |
| December 3 | Lorelei and the Laser Eyes | PS4, PS5 | | Puzzle | Simogo | Annapurna Interactive | |
| December 3 | Warhammer 40,000: Darktide | PS5 | | Action, FPS | Fatshark | | |
| December 4 | Crystar (WW) | PS5 | | Action RPG | Gemdrops | Spike Chunsoft | |
| December 4 | Donkey Kong GB: Dinky Kong & Dixie Kong (JP) | NS | Port | Platformer | Rare | Nintendo | |
| December 4 | Donkey Kong Land III | NS | Port | Platformer | Rare | Nintendo | |
| December 4 | Morkull Ragast's Rage | NS, PS5 | | Action, Platformer | Disaster Games | Selecta Play, Astrolabe Games | |
| December 4 | Raft | PS5, XBX/S | | Survival, Adventure, Sandbox | Redbeet Interactive | Axolot Games | |
| December 4 | The Thaumaturge | PS5, XBX/S | | RPG | Fool's Theory | 11 Bit Studios | |
| December 5 | Abyss Seeker: What Do You See Deep in The Abyss | WIN | | Action, Roguelike, Shoot 'em up (twin-stick) | Success | | |
| December 5 | Caves of Qud | WIN, OSX, LIN | Full release | Roguelike, RPG | Freehold Games | Kitfox Games | |
| December 5 | Fantasian Neo Dimension | WIN, NS, PS4, PS5, XBX/S | | RPG | Mistwalker | Square Enix | |
| December 5 | Fitness Boxing 3: Your Personal Trainer | NS | Original | Fitness, Rhythm, Sports | Imagineer | JP: Imagineer; WW: Nintendo | |
| December 5 | Heaven Seeker: The Savior of This Cruel World | NS, PS4, PS5, iOS, DROID | | Action, Roguelike, Shoot 'em up (twin-stick) | Success | | |
| December 5 | Infinity Nikki | WIN, PS5, iOS, DROID | | Action-adventure | Papergames | Infold Games | |
| December 5 | Mythwrecked: Ambrosia Island | WIN, NS, XBO, XBX/S | | Adventure | Polygon Treehouse | Whitethorn Games | |
| December 5 | Nikoderiko: The Magical World | WIN, PS4, XBO | | Platformer | Vea Games | Knights Peak | |
| December 5 | Railroads Online | WIN, PS5, XBX/S | Full release | Sandbox, Simulation | Stefan Kelnberger | Astragon | |
| December 5 | RollerCoaster Tycoon Classic | NS | | CMS | Origin8 Technologies | Atari | |
| December 5 | Savant: Ascent REMIX | NS | | Platformer, Shoot 'em up | D-Pad Studio | | |
| December 5 | Stella of the End | NS | | Visual novel | Key | Prototype | |
| December 5 | The Thing: Remastered | WIN, NS, PS4, PS5, XBO, XBX/S | Remaster | Survival horror, TPS | Nightdive Studios | | |
| December 5 | Uncle Chop's Rocket Shop | WIN, NS, PS5, XBX/S | | Puzzle, Simulation | Beard Envy | Kasedo Games | |
| December 5 | Under Defeat | WIN, NS, PS4, PS5, XBX/S | | Shoot 'em up | G.rev, City Connection | JP: City Connection; WW: Clear River Games | |
| December 6 | Dog Man: Mission Impawsible | WIN, NS, PS4, PS5, XBX/S | | Adventure, Platformer | Floor 84 Studio | Mindscape | |
| December 6 | Marvel Rivals | WIN, PS5, XBX/S | Original | Hero shooter | NetEase Games | | |
| December 6 | Real Heroes: Firefighter HD | PS5 | Port | FPS | Epicenter Studios | Ziggurat Interactive | |
| December 6 | Shadow Tactics: Blades of the Shogun – Aiko's Choice | PS5, XBX/S | Expansion | RTT | Mimimi Games | Daedalic Entertainment | |
| December 9 | A Date with Death - Beyond the Bet | WIN, OSX, LIN | Expansion | Visual novel, Dating sim | Two and a Half Studios | | |
| December 9 | Doraemon Dorayaki Shop Story | WIN | | Simulation | Kairosoft | | |
| December 9 | Indiana Jones and the Great Circle | WIN, XBX/S | Original | Action-adventure | MachineGames | Bethesda Softworks | |
| December 9 | Paper Perjury | WIN | Original | Adventure, Visual novel | Paper Cat Games | | |
| December 10 | Legacy of Kain: Soul Reaver 1 & 2 Remastered | WIN, NS, PS4, PS5, XBO, XBX/S | Remaster, Compilation | Action-adventure | Aspyr | | |
| December 10 | Mighty Morphin Power Rangers: Rita's Rewind | WIN, NS, PS4, PS5, XBO, XBX/S | Original | Brawler | Digital Eclipse | | |
| December 10 | Monument Valley 3 | iOS, DROID | Original | Puzzle | Ustwo Games | Netflix Games | |
| December 10 | Resident Evil 2 | OSX, iOS | Port | Survival horror | Capcom | | |
| December 10 | TAITO Milestones 3 | NS | Compilation | —N/a | Hamster Corporation | ININ Games | |
| December 11 | MiSide | WIN | | Horror (psych), Adventure | AIHASTO | IndieArk, Shochiku | |
| December 11 | Shiren the Wanderer: The Mystery Dungeon of Serpentcoil Island | WIN | | Roguelike, RPG | Spike Chunsoft | | |
| December 12 | ACA NEOGEO Selection Vol. 1 (JP) | NS | Compilation | —N/a | Hamster Corporation, SNK | SNK | |
| December 12 | ACA NEOGEO Selection Vol. 2 (JP) | NS | Compilation | —N/a | Hamster Corporation, SNK | SNK | |
| December 12 | Angelian Trigger (JP) | NS | Original | Shoot 'em up | PiXEL | | |
| December 12 | Arma Reforger | PS5 | | FPS | Bohemia Interactive | | |
| December 12 | Besiege | NS, PS4, PS5 | | Sandbox, Strategy, Puzzle | Spiderling Studios | Playism | |
| December 12 | Cho Aniki Collection (JP) | NS | Compilation | Shoot 'em up | Edia | | |
| December 12 | Disney Music Parade: Encore (AS) | NS | | Action, Rhythm | Imagineer | | |
| December 12 | Enotria: The Last Song | XBX/S | | Soulslike, Action RPG | Jyamma Games | | |
| December 12 | Fairy Tail 2 (JP) | WIN, NS, PS4, PS5 | | RPG | Gust | Koei Tecmo | |
| December 12 | Farewell North | PS5 | | Narrative adventure | Kyle Banks | Mooneye Studios | |
| December 12 | The Finals | PS4 | Port | FPS | Embark Studios | | |
| December 12 | For the King II | PS5, XBO, XBX/S | | Roguelike, Tactical RPG | IronOak Games | Curve Games | |
| December 12 | Maki: Paw of Fury | WIN, NS | | Brawler | Bacord | RedDeer.Games | |
| December 12 | Momotaro Dentetsu: Showa, Heisei, Reiwa Mo Teiban! Asia Edition (AS) | NS | | Digital tabletop | Konami Digital Entertainment | | |
| December 12 | Mystery Walk (JP) | NS | | Visual novel | Toybox | Imagineer | |
| December 12 | The Spirit of the Samurai | WIN | | Metroidvania, Action-adventure | Digital Mind Games | Kwalee | |
| December 12 | Tetris (NES) | NS | Port | Puzzle | Nintendo R&D1 | Nintendo | |
| December 12 | Tetris DX | NS | Port | Puzzle | Nintendo R&D1 | Nintendo | |
| December 12 | Victory Heat Rally | NS | | Racing | Skydevilpalm | Playtonic Friends | |
| December 13 | Antonblast | NS | Port | Action, Platformer | Summitsphere | | |
| December 13 | Chernobylite Complete Edition | NS | Port | Survival horror | The Farm 51 | Untold Tales | |
| December 13 | Fairy Tail 2 | WIN, NS, PS4, PS5 | Original | RPG | Gust | Koei Tecmo | |
| December 13 | Seedsow Lullaby | WIN | | Visual novel | iMel | ANIPLEX.EXE | |
| December 13 | Xuan-Yuan Sword: The Gate of Firmament | PS5 | | Action RPG | Softstar, DOMO Studio | eastasiasoft | |
| December 16 | Changeable Guardian Estique | NES | Original | Scrolling shooter (horizontal) | Cat Hui Trading | Broke Studio | |
| December 16 | Neko Odyssey | WIN | Original | Adventure | Secret Character | Flyhigh Works | |
| December 16 | On Your Tail | WIN | | Adventure, Life sim | Memorable Games | Humble Games | |
| December 17 | Penny Blood: Hellbound | WIN | Full release | Roguelike, Hack and slash | Natsume Atari, Studio Wildrose | Natsume Atari | |
| December 17 | Snufkin: Melody of Moominvalley | PS5, XBX/S | | Adventure | Hyper Games | Raw Fury | |
| December 18 | Venture to the Vile | PS4, PS5 | | Metroidvania | Cut to Bits | Aniplex | |
| December 19 | DoDonPachi True Death (JP) | NS | | Bullet hell | CAVE Interactive | Live Wire | |
| December 19 | Gimmick! 2 (JP) | PS4, PS5, XBO, XBX/S | | Platformer | Bitwave Games | Sunsoft, Clear River Games | |
| December 19 | Hypnosis Mic: Alternative Rap Battle 1st Period (JP) | NS | | Rhythm, Visual novel | Idea Factory | Altergear | |
| December 19 | Kono Aozora ni Yakusoku o Refine (JP) | NS, PS4 | | Visual novel | Entergram, Giga | Entergram | |
| December 19 | Tokyo Clanpool | WW: WIN; AS: NS | | RPG | Compile Heart | eastasiasoft | |
| December 19 | Tsumi no Hikari Rendezvous (JP) | NS, PS4 | | Visual novel | Entergram, Minori | Entergram | |
| December 20 | Fountains | WIN, OSX, LIN | Original | Soulslike | John Pywell | Crunching Koalas | |
| December 26 | Dawning Subaru, and The Owl lurking in the twilight. (JP) | WIN, NS, PS4 | | Visual novel | Entergram | | |
| December 26 | Stray Children (JP) | NS | | RPG | Onion Games | | |
| December 27 | Where Winds Meet (CN) | WIN | | Action RPG | Everstone Studio | | |
| December 29 | Misericorde: Volume Two | WIN | | Mystery, Visual novel | Xeecee | Xeecee | |
