= Luma Island =

- Developer: Feel Free Games
- Publisher: Feel Free Games
- Platform: Windows
- Release: 20 November 2024
- Genre: Life simulation

Luma Island is a 2024 life simulation game developed and published by Feel Free Games. It was released for Windows on 20 November 2024.

== Gameplay ==
Luma Island is a life simulation game with elements of role-playing video game, adventure game, and puzzles. The game follows the player character, who has moved to the island after an unfulfilling office job and purchased a small farm. The story focuses on the mysterious happenings around the titular island and an ancient prophecy. The player chooses starting profession out of seven available options, including treasure hunter and archaeologist, and can later purchase the other professions. Progress is made through upgrading the ranks of the professions.

The player can befriend magical creatures called Lumas, which must be discovered and hatched from eggs. Once hatched, they help the player find treasure and provide Luma Energy, a resource necessary regardless of the player's profession. The game supports cooperative game play.

== Development and release ==
Luma Island was developed by Netherlands-based studio Feel Free Games. It was announced in February 2024, and released in 20 November for Windows. A demo became available on 14 October as part of Steam Next Fest.

A major update subtitled "Pirates" was released on 20 June 2025, adding new areas, Lumas, and a new profession.
