= Indus Battle Royale =

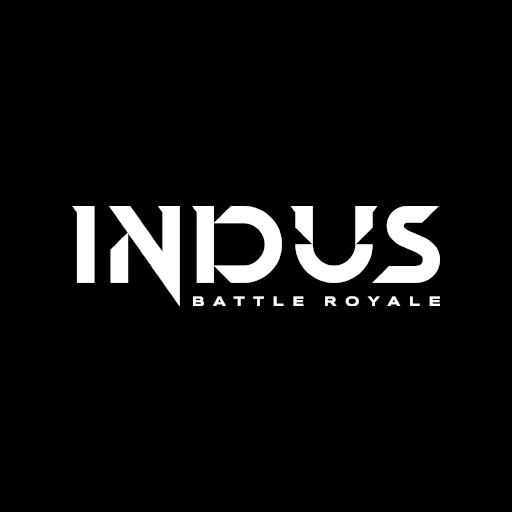
- Developer: SuperGaming
- Publisher: SuperGaming
- Engine: Unity
- Platforms: Android, iOS
- Release: October 16, 2024; 17 months ago
- Genre: Battle royale game

Indus Battle Royale is an indo-futuristic battle royale game developed and published by SuperGaming. The game was launched worldwide on 16 October 2024.

== Gameplay ==
The island map of Indus, Virlok, has a futuristic concept based on Indian culture and lush vegetation. Players can choose between first-person and third-person perspective.

Indus is inspired by Indian culture and mythology, and features the Indus Valley Civilisation as the theme. The game is set in "Indo-Futurism, a futuristic world that is unapologetically Indian in its exploration and representation of science fiction".

== Release ==
On Google Play for Android, the pre-registration for Indus was opened in January 2023. On 16 October 2024, the game was released on Android and iOS.
