= Dogman =

Dogman or Dog Man may refer to:

== Arts and entertainment ==
- Dog Man (book series), a comedic graphic novel series by Dav Pilkey
  - Dog Man (film), a 2025 animated film based on the graphic novel series
  - Dog Man (soundtrack), the soundtrack to the 2025 film of the same name
  - Dog Man: The Musical, musical based on the Dav Pilkey book series
- Dogman (children's musical), by John Dowie
- Dogman (album), a 1994 album by King's X
  - "Dogman" (song), a song from the album of the same name
- "Dogman", a song by Trash Talk from the 2012 album 119
- Dogman (2018 film), an Italian crime drama film
- Dogman (2023 film), a French action drama film
- Dogman, a character created by Gillie and Marc

== Folklore and mythology ==
- Beast of Bray Road
- Michigan Dogman
- Weredog, a canine therianthropic creature

== Jobs ==
- Dogman, a person who raises dogs for dog fighting
- Dogman, who directs crane operations, banksman, in Australia and New Zealand
- Dogman, a steelwork erector ironworker
- Dog man, a slang term for a police dog handler in British police forces
