= E3 2020 =

Cancelled 26th annual Electronic Entertainment Expo

Electronic Entertainment Expo 2020
- Status: Cancelled
- Begins: June 9, 2020 (planned)
- Ends: June 11, 2020 (planned)
- Venue: Los Angeles Convention Center
- Locations: Los Angeles, California
- Country: United States
- Previous event: E3 2019
- Next event: E3 2021
- Organizer: Entertainment Software Association
- Filing status: Non-profit

The Electronic Entertainment Expo 2020 (E3 2020) would have been the 26th E3, during which hardware manufacturers, software developers, and publishers from the video game industry would have presented new and upcoming products. The event, organized by the Entertainment Software Association (ESA), was to take place at the Los Angeles Convention Center from June 9–11, 2020. However, due to concerns over the COVID-19 pandemic, the ESA announced it would cancel the event, marking the first time since the launch of E3 in 1995 that it was not held. In lieu of that, several publishers made plans to continue with presentations of game announcements during the planned E3 period, while others opted to use more traditional marketing throughout the year.

== Format and changes ==
In the days prior to the event, major hardware and software vendors were to host press conferences at nearby venues, where they would introduce new hardware and games that would be on display at the exhibitor's hall during the actual event. Within the event period, attendees would have been able to view these products at the exhibitor's hall, often including playable game demos, attended special presentations offered by companies, and in some cases, had private meetings with companies on their products. The E3 period is often used by journalists from video game publications as well as social media influencers to provide initial comments on these new games. This also enables retailers to plan out what products to purchase for the remainder of the year, particularly for critical Christmas and holiday sales periods.

E3 2020 was due to continue to offer public passes to the event, though the number offered was increased to 25,000 from 15,000 from the prior E3 event.

The ESA stated that they planned to revise the format for E3 2020 to feature more interactivity for attendees as to reflect the changing audience for the show, and looking to make it a "fan, media and influencer festival". ESA stated the event would be "an exciting, high-energy show featuring new experiences, partners, exhibitor spaces, activations, and programming that will entertain new and veteran attendees alike". ESA president Stanley Pierre-Louis said they were inspired by the Keanu Reeves moment from E3 2019 as the type of event they can't plan for but thrive on, and wanted to create more opportunities for similar events in the future. Part of this would have been achieved by bringing more "celebrity gamers" to various facets of the exposition. Among ESA's creative partners had included iam8bit as creative directors. However, in early March 2020, iam8bit announced they had pulled out as creative directors for the show.

Sony Interactive Entertainment, who had presented at every E3 until E3 2019, stated they would not attend E3 in 2020 for a second year in a row, as the new vision of the show did not meet their goals, and instead they will present at a number of smaller events throughout the year. Microsoft's Xbox division had affirmed they would attend the show, where it was expected that more details of the 4th generation of the Xbox consoles, including the Xbox Series X with release planned in late 2020, would be announced.

Geoff Keighley, who had organized and hosted the E3 Coliseum, a live-streamed event over the course of E3 with interviews with developers and publishers, since E3 2017, said that he had decided not to participate this year nor be a part of E3, the first time in 25 years. Pierre-Louis stated that they had still planned to have digital programming like E3 Coliseum.

=== Cancellation due to the COVID-19 pandemic ===
In wake of the COVID-19 pandemic and the state of emergency declared by Los Angeles County in early March 2020, ESA stated then that they were assessing the situation but at the time were still planning on going ahead with the event. The ESA formally announced they had officially canceled the physical event on March 11, 2020, stating "Following increased and overwhelming concerns about the COVID-19 virus, we felt this was the best way to proceed during such an unprecedented global situation. We are very disappointed that we are unable to hold this event for our fans and supporters. But we know it's the right decision based on the information we have today." In addition to providing full refunds for participants, the ESA was looking into options for virtual presentations for exhibitors to use during the planned week as an alternative event.

On April 7, 2020, the ESA told PC Gamer that they had determined they would not be able to host a digital E3 event as the disruption caused by the pandemic made it difficult to assemble the event. Instead, the ESA would offer to manage individual partners' announcements via the E3 website.

== Alternative events ==
=== Microsoft ===
Microsoft announced after the cancellation of E3 2020 that it would host a digital event to cover information it had planned to provide at E3, including games and details on the fourth generation of Xbox consoles it launched in 2020. Starting in May 2020, Microsoft began running monthly events to reveal new games for the Xbox Series X and other hardware details.

Among the games Microsoft revealed on its May 7, 2020, event include:

- The Ascent - Neon Giant (XSX)
- Assassin's Creed Valhalla - Ubisoft Montreal (PC, PS4, PS5, XONE, XSX)
- Bright Memory: Infinite - FYQD Studio (XSX)
- Call of the Sea - Out of the Blue (PC, XONE, XSX)
- Chorus - Fishlabs (PS5, XSX)
- Dirt 5 - Codemasters (PC, PS4, PS5, XONE, XSX)
- Madden NFL 21 - EA Tiburon (PC, PS4, PS5, XONE, XSX)
- The Medium - Bloober Team (PC, XSX)
- Scarlet Nexus - Bandai Namco Studios (PC, PS4, PS5, XONE, XSX)
- Scorn - Ebb Software (PC, XSX)
- Second Extinction - Systemic Reaction (PC, XONE, XSX)
- Vampire: The Masquerade – Bloodlines 2 - Hardsuit Labs (PC, PS4, PS5, XONE, XSX)
- Yakuza: Like a Dragon - Ryu Ga Gotoku Studio (PC, XONE, XSX)

Microsoft had a second games reveal event on July 23, 2020, focusing primarily on titles from the Xbox Game Studios. These included:

- As Dusk Falls - Interior/Night (PC, XONE, XSX)
- Avowed - Obsidian Entertainment (PC, XSX)
- CrossfireX Campaign - Smilegate (XONE, XSX)
- Destiny 2: Beyond Light - Bungie (PC, XONE, XSX)
- Everwild - Rare (PC, XSX)
- Fable - Playground Games (PC, XSX)
- Forza Motorsport - Turn 10 Studios (PC, XSX)
- Grounded - Obsidian Entertainment (PC, XONE, XSX)
- The Gunk - Image & Form (PC, XONE, XSX)
- Halo Infinite - 343 Industries (PC, XONE, XSX)
- The Medium - Bloober Team (PC, XONE, XSX)
- New Genesis: Phantasy Star Online - Sega (PC, XONE, XSX)
- Ori and the Will of the Wisps - Moon Studios (PC, XONE, XSX)
- Psychonauts 2 - Double Fine (PC, PS4, XONE, XSX)
- The Outer Worlds: Peril On Gorgon - Obsidian Entertainment (PC, PS4, XONE, XSX)
- S.T.A.L.K.E.R. 2 - GSC Game World
- Senua's Saga: Hellblade II - Ninja Theory
- State of Decay 3 - Undead Labs (PC, XSX)
- Tell Me Why - Dontnod Entertainment (PC, XONE, XSX)
- Tetris Effect Connected - Monstars (PC, XONE, XSX)
- Warhammer 40,000: Darktide - Fatshark (PC, XSX)

=== Sony ===
Sony ran its major reveal of the PlayStation 5 console and numerous games in an online presentation on June 11, 2020. Among the games revealed include:

- Astro's Playroom - Japan Studio (PS5)
- Bugsnax - Young Horses (PC, PS5)
- Deathloop - Arkane Studios (PC, PS5)
- Demon's Souls (2020 video game) remake - Bluepoint Games (PS5)
- Destruction AllStars - Lucid Games (PS5)
- Ghostwire: Tokyo - Tango Gameworks (PC, PS5)
- Godfall - Counterplay Games (PC, PS5)
- Goodbye Volcano High - KO_OP (PC, PS4, PS5)
- Grand Theft Auto V and Grand Theft Auto Online - Rockstar Games (PS5, XSX)
- Gran Turismo 7 - Polyphony Digital (PS5)
- Hitman 3 - IO Interactive (PC, PS4, PS5, XONE, XSX)
- Horizon Forbidden West - Guerrilla Games (PS5, PS4)
- Jett: The Far Shore - Superbrothers (PS5)
- Kena: Bridge of Spirits - Emberlab (PC, PS4, PS5)
- Little Devil Inside - Neostream Interactive (PS5)
- NBA 2K21 - Visual Concepts (PS5, XSX)
- Oddworld: Soulstorm - Oddworld Inhabitants, Frima Studio (PC, PS4, PS5)
- Pragmata - Capcom (PS5, XSX, PC)
- Project Athia - Luminous Productions (PC, PS5)
- Ratchet & Clank: Rift Apart - Insomniac Games (PS5)
- Resident Evil Village - Capcom (PC, PS5, XSX)
- Returnal - Housemarque (PS5)
- Sackboy: A Big Adventure - Sumo Digital (PS5)
- Solar Ash - Heart Machine (PC, PS5)
- Spider-Man: Miles Morales - Insomniac Games (PS5)
- Stray - Bluetwelve (PS5)

=== Nintendo ===
Nintendo had planned to hold a mainline Nintendo Direct presentation in June 2020 to showcase its planned offerings for the rest of 2020 as its means for alternate E3 announcements. However, complications related to the pandemic caused the event to be cancelled. Many reports indicated they would focus on the 35th anniversary of the Super Mario series in the event, with titles such as Mario Kart Live: Home Circuit and Super Mario 3D All-Stars, which they later did in September 2020.

=== Electronic Arts ===
Electronic Arts, which has generally held its "EA Play" side event alongside E3 in a nearby Los Angeles location in the previous years but has not been part of E3 directly, instead held an "EA Play" online showcase on June 18, 2020. Among game announcements, EA stated their plan to continue to bring their games to the Steam platform for Windows (in addition to their Origin platform), including the EA Access subscription program, and to the Nintendo Switch and a larger commitment to cross-platform play for more of their titles. New or update titles presented during the presentation included Apex Legends, It Takes Two, Lost in Random, Rocket Arena, and Star Wars: Squadrons, as well as a planned new game in the Skate series.

=== Devolver Digital ===
Devolver Digital, which had already planned to run a streamed event at E3, held their showcase on July 11, 2020. The showcase continued the narrative around the company's fictional chief synergy officer Nina Struthers from previous years wrapped around the various announcements. Among the announcements included:

- Carrion - Phobia Game Studio (PC, NS, XOne)
- Devolverland Expo - Flying Wild Hog (PC)
- Fall Guys: Ultimate Knockout - Mediatonic (PC, PS4)
- Olija - Skeleton Crew (PC, NS)
- Serious Sam 4 - Croteam (PC, PS4, XOne)
- Shadow Warrior 3 - Flying Wild Hog (PC, PS4, XOne)

=== Ubisoft ===
Ubisoft ran a "Ubisoft Forward" digital event on July 12, 2020, announcing several upcoming titles, including:

- Assassin's Creed: Valhalla (PC, PS4, PS5, XOne, XSX, Stadia)
- Far Cry 6 (PC, PS4, PS5, XOne, XSX)
- Hyper Scape (PC)
- Watch Dogs: Legion (PC, PS4, PS5, XOne, XSX)

=== Limited Run Games ===
Limited Run Games planned to run an online presentation for its upcoming games on June 8, 2020, but the event was delayed and ultimately canceled due to the George Floyd protests.

=== IGN Summer of Gaming ===
The video game website IGN ran an online "Summer of Gaming" expo from June 11 to 13, 2020, that featured announcements, gameplay trailers and interviews with developers. Among the new games revealed or featured during this expo were:

- 13 Sentinels: Aegis Rim - Vanillaware (PS4)
- Alex Kidd in Miracle World DX - Jankenteam (PC, NS, PS4, XONE)
- Beyond Blue - E-Line Media (PC, PS4, XONE)
- Blankos Block Party - Third Kind Games (PC)
- Blue Fire - Robi Studios (NS)
- Borderlands 3 - Gearbox Software (PC, PS4, XONE)
- Bravery Network Online - Gloam Collective (PC)
- CastleStorm 2 - Zen Studios (PC, NS, PS4, XONE)
- Chivalry 2 - Torn Banner Studios (PC, PS4, PS5, XONE, XSX)
- CRSED: F.O.A.D. - Darkflow Software (PC, Xbox Series X, PS5, Xbox One)
- Demon Turf - Fabraz (PC, NS, XSX)
- Dual Universe - Novaquark (PC)
- Everspace 2 - Rockfish Games (PC)
- Foreclosed - Antab Studios (PC, NS, PS4, XONE)
- GTFO - 10 Chambers Collective (PC)
- Guilty Gear Strive - Arc System Works (PC, PS4)
- Hardspace: Shipbreaker - Blackbird Studios (PC, PS4, XONE)
- The Iron Oath - Curious Panda Games (PC)
- Lucifer Within Us - Kitfox Games (PC)
- Metal: Hellsinger - The Outsiders (PC, PS4, PS5, XONE, XSX)
- Mortal Shell - Playstack (PC, PS4, XONE)
- Nickelodeon Kart Racers 2: Grand Prix - GameMill Entertainment (NS, PS4, XONE)
- Observer: System Redux - Bloober Team (PS5, XSX)
- Pathfinder: Kingmaker - Owlcat Games (PC, PS4, XONE)
- Phantasy Star Online 2 - Sega (PC, NS, PS4, XONE)
- Ranch Simulator - Toxic Dog (PC)
- The Riftbreaker - Exor Studios (PC, PS4, XONE)
- Rustler - Jutsu Games (PC)
- Samurai Jack: Battle Through Time - Soleil (PC, NS, PS4, XONE)
- Second Extinction - Systemic Reaction (PC)
- Skater XL - East Day Studios (PC, NS, PS4, XONE)
- Spellbreak - Proletariat, Inc. (PC, NS, PS4, XONE)
- Star Renegades - Massive Damage (PC, NS, PS4, XONE)
- Stronghold: Warlords - Firefly Studios (PC)
- Total War: Troy - Creative Assembly (PC)
- Unto the End - 2 Ton Studios (PC, NS, PS4, XONE)
- Voidtrain - Neagra (PC)
- Wasteland 3 - inXile Entertainment (PC, PS4, XONE)
- The Waylanders - Gato Studio (PC)
- Warhammer 40,000: Mechanicus - Bulwark Studios (PC, NS, PS4, XONE)
- Werewolf: The Apocalypse – Earthblood - Cyanide ((PC, PS4, XONE)
- XIII Remake - Microids (PC, NS, PS4, XONE)
- Yakuza: Like a Dragon - Ryu Ga Gotoku Studio (PC, XONE, XSX)

=== Guerrilla Collective Live / PC Gaming Show / Future Games Show ===
Several independent and larger publishers presented a series of announcement streams between June 13 and 15, hosted by Greg Miller, as part of the "Guerrilla Collective" in lieu of E3. Among those participating include Rebellion Developments, Raw Fury, Paradox Interactive, Larian Studios, Funcom, Versus Evil, ZA/UM, Coffee Stain Studios, 11 Bit Studios, and Humble Publishing.

The June 13 Guerrilla Collective presentation partnered with PC Gamer's PC Gaming Show and GamesRadar's Future Games Show to also run their showcases the same day. Among the presentations in the PC Gaming Show included Epic Games Store, Frontier Developments, Intel, Perfect World Entertainment, and Tripwire Interactive.

The following games were announced or covered during the three shows:

- 30XX - Batterystaple Games (PC)
- A Juggler's Tale - Kaleidoscube (PC)
- Aeolis Tournament - Beyond Fun Studio (PC, NS)
- Airborne Kingdom - The Wandering Band (PC)
- Alaloth - Champions of The Four KingdomsGamera Interactive (PC)
- Almighty: Kill Your Gods - Runwild Entertainment (PC)
- The Almost Gone - Happy Volcano (PC)
- Ambition: A Minuet of Power - Joy Manufacturing Co. (PC)
- Among Trees - FJRD Interactive (PC)
- Anno: Mutationem - Beijing ThinkingStars Technology Development (PC)
- ArcheAge - XL Games (PC)
- Baldur's Gate III - Larian Studios (PC, Stadia)
- Blankos: Block Party - Third Kind Games (PC)
- Blightbound - Romino Games (PC)
- Boyfriend Dungeon - Kitfox Games (PC)
- The Cabbage Effect - Ninja Garage (PC)
- Calico - CatBean Games (PC, NS, PS4, XO)
- Call of the Sea - Out of the Blue (PC, PS5, XSX)
- The Captain is Dead - Thunderbox Entertainment (PC)
- Cardaclysm - Headup Games (PC)
- Carrion - Phobia Game Studio (PC)
- Cartel Tycoon - Moon Moose (PC)
- Carto - Sunhead Games (PC)
- Children of Morta - Dead Mage (PC, NS, XO, PS4)
- Cloudpunk - Ion Lands (PC)
- Colt Canyon - Retrific (PC, NS, XO)
- Coreupt - Rogue Co (PC)
- Cris Tales - Dreams Uncorporated (PC)
- Crusader Kings 3 - Paradox Development Studio (PC)
- Cyanide & Happiness – Freakpocalypse - Serenity Forge (PC, NS, PS4, XO)
- Cygni: All Guns Blazing - KeelWorks (PC)
- Dead Static Drive - Fanclub (PC, XO)
- Disco Elysium - ZA/UM (PC, NS, XO, PS4)
- Disintegration - V1 Interactive (PC, PS4, XO)
- Divinity: Original Sin 2 - Larian Studios (PC, NS, PS4, XO)
- Doggone - Raconteur Games (PC)
- dont_forget_me - The Moon Pirates (PC)
- Doors of Insanity - OneShark (PC)
- Drake Hollow - The Molasses Flood (PC, XO)
- Dreamscaper - Afterburner Studios (PC)
- The Dungeon of Naheulbeuk: The Amulet of Chaos - Artefacts Studio (PC)
- Dustborn - Red Thread Games (PC)
- Dwarf Fortress - Bay 12 Games/Kitfox Games (PC)
- DwarfHeim - Pineleaf Studios (PC)
- Edo No Yami - roglobytes Games (PC, NS, PS4, XO)
- El Hijo: A Wild West Tale - Honig Studios (PC, NS, PS4, XO)
- Eldest Souls - Fallen Flag Studios (PC, NS)
- Elite Dangerous - Frontier Developments (PC, PS4, XO)
- Empire of Sin - Romero Games (PC)
- Escape from Tarkov - Battlestate Games (PC)
- The Eternal Cylinder - ACE Team (PC, PS4, XO)
- Evan's Remains - Whitehorn Digital (PC, NS, PS4, XO)
- Everspace 2 - Rockfish Games (PC)
- Evil Genius 2 - Rebellion Developments (PC)
- Exo One - Exbleative (PC)
- Fae Tactics - Endlessfluff Games (PC)
- The Falconeer - Tomas Sela (PC, XO)
- Fall Guys: Ultimate Knockout - Mediatonic (PC)
- Fights in Tight Spaces - Ground Shatter (PC)
- Floppy Knights - Rose City Games (PC)
- The Forgotten City - Modern Storyteller (PC, XO)
- Frostpunk - 11 Bit Studios (PC, XO, PS4)
- Genesis Noir - Feral Cat Den (PC)
- Gestalt: Steam and Cinder - Metamorphosis Games (PC)
- Get to the Orange Door - Headup Games (PC, XO)
- Ghostrunner - One More Level (PC, NS, PS4, XO)
- Gloomwood - New Blood Interactive (PC)
- Godfall - Counterpoint Games (PC, PS5)
- Gonner2 - Art in Heart (PC)
- Gori: Cuddly Carnage - Angry Demon Studio (PC)
- Hammerting - Team17 (PC)
- Story of Seasons: Friends of Mineral Town - Marvelous Interactive (PC, NS)
- Haven - The Game Bakers (PC)
- Hotshot Racing - Lucky Mountain Games (PC)
- Humankind - Amplitude Studios (PC)
- Hundred Days - Broken Arms Games (PC, NS)
- Icarus - RocketWerks (PC)
- Ikenfell - Chevy Ray (PC)
- In Sound Mind - We Create Stuff (PC)
- Inkulinati - Yaza Games (PC)
- Jay and Silent Bob Chronic Blunt Punch - Interabang Entertainment (PC)
- Just Die Already - DoubleMoose (PC)
- Kena: Bridge of Spirits - Emberlab (PC, PS4, PS5)
- Lake - Gamious (PC)
- The Last Campfire - Hello Games (PC, PS4, XO)
- Last Oasis - Donkey Crew (PC)
- Later Daters - Bloom Digital Media (PC, NS)
- Liberated - Atomic Wolf (PC)
- Lord Winklebottom Investigates - Cave Monsters (PC)
- Lost at Sea - Studio Fizbin (PC)
- Mafia: Definitive Edition - Hanger 13 (PC, PS4, XO)
- Maid of Sker - Wales Interactive (PC, NS, PS4, XO)
- Main Assembly - Bad Yolk Games (PC)
- Metal: Hellsinger - The Outsiders (PC, PS4, PS5, XO, XSX)
- Midnight Ghost Hunt - Vaulted Sky Games (PC)
- Minute of Islands - Studio Fizbin (PC, NS, PS4, XO)
- Morbid: The Seven Acolytes - Still Running (PC)
- Mortal Shell - Cold Symmetry (PC, PS4, XO)
- Neon Abyss - Team17 (PC, NS, PS4, XO)
- New World - Amazon Game Studios Orange County (PC)
- Night Call - Monkey Moon (PC, NS, XO)
- No Place for Bravery - Glitch Factory (PC)
- No Straight Roads - Sold-Out Software (PC, NS, PS4, XO)
- Nuts - Noodlecake (PC, iOS)
- One Step from Eden - Thomas Moon Kang (PC)
- Ooblets - Glumberland (PC)
- Operation Tango - Clever Plays (PC)
- Outbuddies DX - Headup Games (PC, NS, XO)
- The Outlast Trials - Red Barrels (PC)
- Outriders - People Can Fly (PC, PS4, PS5, XO, XSX)
- Paradise Killer - Fellow Traveller (PC)
- Paradise Killer - Kaizen Game Works (PC)
- Paradise Lost - PolyAmorous (PC)
- Per Aspera - Tlön Industries (PC)
- Persona 4 Golden - Atlus (PC)
- Popup Dungeon - Triple.B.Titles (PC)
- Potionomics - Voracious Games (PC)
- Princess Farmer - Samboee Games (PC)
- Prison Architect - Double Eleven (PC)
- Prodeus - Bounding Box Software (PC)
- Project Wingman - Sector D2 (PC)
- Pull Stay - Nito Souji (PC)
- Pushy and Pully in Blockland - Resistance Studio (PC, NS, PS4, XO)
- Quantum Error - Big Panther Media (PC, PS5)
- Raji: An Ancient Epic - Nodding Heads Games (PC)
- Read Only Memories: Neurodiver - Midboss (PC)
- Red Sails - Red Sails Team (PC)
- Remnant: From the Ashes - Gunfire Games (PC, PS4, XO)
- Remothered: Broken Porcelain - Stormind Games (PC, NS, PS4, XO)
- Rigid Force: Redux - Headup Games (PC, NS, XO)
- Ring of Pain - Simon Boxer (PC)
- Rogue Company - First Watch Games (PC, NS, PS4, XO)
- Röki - Polygon Treehouse (PC)
- ScourgeBringer - Flying Oak Games (PC, NS, PS4, XO)
- Serial Cleaners - Draw Distance (PC)
- Shadow Man Remastered - Nightdive Studios (PC, NS, PS4, XO)
- Shadows of Doubt - ColePowered Games (PC)
- Sherlock Holmes: Chapter One - Frogwares (PC)
- Skate Story - Sam Eng (PC)
- SkateBird - Glass Bottom Games (PC, XO)
- Skater XL - Easy Day Studios (PC, NS, PS4, XO)
- Skeleton Crew - Cinder Cone (PC)
- Slay the Spire - Megacrit (PC, NS, PS4, XO, iOS)
- Smite - Titan Forge Games (PC, NS, PS4, XO)
- Source of Madness - Carry Castle (PC, NS)
- Space Crew - Curve Digital (PC, NS, PS4, XO)
- Speed Limit - Gamechuck (PC)
- Spellbreak - Proletariat, Inc. (PC, XO)
- Stage Hands! - suchagamestudio (PC)
- Star Renegades - Massive Damage (PC, NS, PS4, XO)
- Summer in Mara - Chibig (PC, NS, PS4)
- Surviving the Aftermath - Haemimont Games (PC)
- Suzerain - Torpor Games (PC)
- Swimsanity! - Decoy Games (PC)
- System Shock - Nightdive Studios (PC)
- Torchlight 3 - Echtra Inc. (PC)
- Trash Sailors - fluckyMachine (PC, NS)
- Twin Mirror - Dontnod Entertainment (PC)
- Ultrakill - New Blood Interactive (PC)
- Unbound: Worlds Apart - Alien Pixel Studios (PC)
- UnDungeon - Laughing Machines (PC)
- Unexplored 2: The Wayfarer's Legacy - Ludomotion (PC)
- Unfortunate Spacemen - New Blood Interactive (PC)
- Uragun - Kool2Play (PC)
- Valheim - Iron Gate AB (PC)
- Vampire: The Masquerade – Bloodlines 2 - Hardsuit Labs (PC, PS4, PS5, XO, XSX)
- Vigil: The Longest Night - Glass Heart Games (PC, NS, PS4, XO)
- Waking - tinyBuild (PC, XO)
- Wasteland 3 - InXile Entertainment (PC, PS4, XO)
- Wave Break - Funktronic Labs (PC)
- Weird West - WolfEye Studios (PC)
- Welcome to Elk - Triple Topping (PC, XO)
- Werewolf: The Apocalypse – Heart of the Forest - Different Tales (PC)
- West of Dead - Upstream Arcade (PC)
- Windjammers 2 - Dotemu (PC, NS, Stadia)
- Wolfstride - OTA IMON Studios (PC, NS, PS4, XO)

=== Summer Game Fest ===
Games journalist Geoff Keighley arranged with numerous developers to run a four-month Summer Game Fest from May to August 2020, helping developers and publisher to host live streams and other events in lieu of the cancellation of E3 and Gamescom. Alongside the Summer Game Fest, Keighley promoted the third Steam Game Festival, following after The Game Awards 2019 and from the previously canceled 2020 Game Developers Conference, which ran from June 16 through June 22, 2020. Over 900 games had demos available on Steam for players to try, alongside a slate of interviews with developers throughout the period. A similar event for Xbox One games occurred from July 21 to 27, 2020, as part of the Summer Game Fest.

Among games and other announcements made during the Summer Game Fest include:

- Tony Hawk's Pro Skater 1 + 2, a remastered version of Tony Hawk's Pro Skater and its sequel for modern systems.
- Unreal Engine 5, the next iteration of Epic Games' game engine to be released in mid-2021.
- Star Wars: Squadrons, a new game from Motive Studios and Electronic Arts featuring team-play combat using the spacecraft of the Star Wars universe like X-wing fighters and TIE fighters.
- Crash Bandicoot 4: It's About Time, a sequel to the original trilogy of Crash Bandicoot games on the original PlayStation console, being developed by Toys for Bob and Activision.
- Cuphead releasing for the PlayStation 4.

=== New Game+ Expo ===
An online video game presentation that was organized by Suda51 and Sean Chiplock that showcased many upcoming games for the remainder of 2020 and early 2021.

The games that were announced during the presentation were:

- 13 Sentinels: Aegis Rim - ATLUS (PS4)
- Billion Road - Bandai Namco Entertainment (NS, Steam)
- Bloodstained: Curse of the Moon 2 - INTI CREATES CO., LTD. (PS4, XO, NS, Steam)
- Bright Memory: Infinite - FYQD Studio (PC, XSX)
- Café Enchanté - Idea Factory (NS)
- Cat Girl Without Salad: Amuse-Bouche - WayForward (NS)
- Catherine: Full Body - ATLUS (NS)
- Collar X Malice - Idea Factory (NS)
- Collar X Malice Unlimited - Idea Factory (NS)
- Cosmic Defenders - Fiery Squirrel (NS)
- Danganronpa: Trigger Happy Havoc Anniversary Edition - Toydea Inc., Spike Chunsoft (iOS, Android)
- Death end re;Quest 2 - Idea Factory, Compile Heart (PS4, Steam)
- Evolutis - Poke Life Studio (PC)
- Fairy Tail - GUST (PS4, NS, Steam)
- Fallen Legion: Revenants - YummyYummyTummy, Inc. (PS4, NS)
- Fight Crab - Nussoft (NS, Steam)
- Giraffe and Annika - atelier mimina (PS4, NS)
- Guilty Gear Strive - Arc System Works Co., Ltd. (PS4)
- Idol Manager - GlitchPitch (PC)
- Legends of Ethernal - Lucid Dreams Studio (PC, PS4, XO, NS, Steam)
- Mad Rat Dead - Nippon Ichi Software (PS4, NS)
- Mighty Switch Force! Collection - WayForward (PC, PS4, XO, NS)
- Neptunia Virtual Stars - Idea Factory, Compile Heart (PS4)
- Piofiore: Fated Memories - Idea Factory (NS)
- Pretty Princess Party - Nippon Columbia (NS)
- Prinny 1•2: Exploded and Reloaded - Nippon Ichi Software (NS)
- Re:ZERO - Starting Life in Another World: The Prophecy of the Throne - Chime Corporation (PS4, NS, Steam)
- Robotics;Notes Double Pack - MAGES. Inc. (PS4, NS, Steam)
- Samurai Shodown Season Pass 2 - SNK CORPORATION (PC, PS4, XO, NS, Stadia)
- Samurai Shodown NEOGEO Collection - Digital Eclipse (PC, PS4, XO, NS, Steam)
- Shiren the Wanderer: The Tower of Fortune and the Dice of Fate - Spike Chunsoft (NS, Steam)
- Tasogare ni Nemuru Machi - Orbital Express (PC)
- Tin & Kuna - Black River Studios (PS4, XO, NS, Steam)
- The Legend of Heroes: Trails of Cold Steel III - Nihon Falcom (NS)
- The Legend of Heroes: Trails of Cold Steel IV - Nihon Falcom (PC, PS4, NS)
- Vitamin Connection - WayForward (NS)
- void tRrLM(); //Void Terrarium - Nippon Ichi Software (PS4, NS)
- Volta-X - GungHo America (NS)
- Ys IX: Monstrum Nox - Nihon Falcom (PC, PS4, NS)
