= Video games in Norway =

The total value of the Norwegian games industry was US$328 million in 2018. The Norwegian games industry managed a turnover of $42 million (NOK 330 million) in 2014. As of 2015, there are 140 companies in the whole sector, with 565 people employed.

== Video game developers from Norway ==
- 4 Gladiators Studio
- Agens Games (Also apps & mobile games)
- Arctic Hazard AS (Also co-dev)
- Billionworlds AS
- Funcom
- Hamar Game Collective (Founded by Sarepta Studio, Krillbite Studio, and Moondrop)
  - Krillbite Studio
  - Sarepta Studio
- High North Studios AS
- Hyper Games (Also co-devs, edutainment & porting)
- Lugn Games AS
- Megapop Games (Also mobile)
- Misc Games AS
- Proletary Games
- Ravn Studio AS (Former publisher)
- Red Thread Games
- Riddlebit Software (Also Riddlebit AS)
- Rock Pocket Games AS (Also co-dev: games, AR/VR. Former publisher.)
- Scape-IT AS
- Snowcastle Games
- Turbo Tape Games

== Defunct video game developers from Norway ==
- Antagonist AS (Founded 2014. Inactive 2017? Staff moved to Audvyr Studio & Corvid Studio.)
- Artplant (Online games. Most employees from Russia then UK. Probably inactive after 2019?)
- Blink Studios (Founded 2011. Defunct 2015. Not the same as 2 other US studios.)
- Capricornus Computer Game Productions AS (Founded 1999. Defunct after 2002.)
- Corvid Studio (Design & audio. Founded 2017. Closed 2023.)
- Moondrop AS (Co-founder of Hamar GC. Founded 2009. Probably inactive after 2019.)
- Offence Software (Founded 1991. Inactive after 1993. Amiga game dev.)
- Pineleaf AS (Founded 2016. Defunct 2022.)
- Trollpants Game Studio (Founded 2014. Defunct 2016.)
- Twilight Zone Software (Founded 1996. Inactive after 1997.)
- Wilhelmsen Studios AS (Founded 2011. Replaced 2024 by Finnish-based Lyra Creative Oy. Mobile games.)

== Video game publishers from Norway ==
- Bifrost Entertainment AS (Also investor)
- Snow Cannon Games (Still active on Android)

=== Publisher and developer firms ===
- 3Dads Studios AS
- Agelvik Games AS
- Arik Games
- BokehDev
- Bromantic Games
- Caprino Video Games AS (Aka. CVG AS. Distribution & licensing subsidiary of Capricornus AS then Caprino Studios for Flåklypa franchise.) (See NO wiki)
- Corebreak Interactive
- D-Pad Studio AS
- Dirtybit AS (Mobile games)
- Frostisen Studio AS
- Lovheim Studios
- Machineboy AS
- Old Man Games DA
- Perfectly Paranormal AS (Games & animations)
- Rain Games AS (See NO wiki)
- Rubarb Studio (Aka. Rubarb AS. Ex-Apt Games in 2019-2021. Co founded by former CEO of Antagonist AS & Corvid Studio.)
- Slid Studio
- Studio Gauntlet
- Surrealist AS
- Teknopilot AS (Publisher & dev. Games, transmedia, audio, VR, edutainment, films, TV.)

== Defunct video game publishers from Norway ==
- Playfish (Founded 2007. Closed or merged into Electronic Arts in 2013. London HQ. Norwegian, Chinese & US studios. Publisher & dev.)

== Popular games ==
- Among the Sleep
- Daniel "Dani" Sooman's games:
  - Crab Game (2021)
  - Muck (2021)
- Flåklypa franchise
- Manual Samuel
- Owlboy
- Skald: Against the Black Priory
- Snufkin: Melody of Moominvalley
- Teslagrad
- The Longest Journey series
  - Dreamfall Chapters
- The Secret World (Original version)
