= Code Violet =

2026 video game

- Developer: TeamKill Media
- Publisher: TeamKill Media
- Engine: Unreal Engine 5
- Platform: PlayStation 5
- Release: January 10, 2026
- Genres: Action horror, third-person shooter
- Mode: Single-player

Code Violet is a 2026 action horror third-person shooter game created by TeamKill Media. Exclusive to PlayStation 5, it was officially released on January 10, 2026. The player controls a woman named Violet Sinclair, who is trapped in a research facility located on an exoplanet overrun by dinosaurs, which she has to fight to escape.

Upon release, the game received negative reception from both critics and players. Nevertheless, the game was featured on PlayStation Store's "Best Sellers" list of new games, taking first place, and became TeamKill Media's best-selling game.

== Plot ==
In the 25th century, a cataclysmic event called "The Cataclysm" turns Earth into a wasteland. Remaining humans lived on an exoplanet TRAPPIST-1e that circles around a dwarf star TRAPPIST-1, located 40 light years away from the Earth. Humans on the planet used a time machine to kidnap women and turn them into surrogates to save humanity. Violet, the main character, is one of the women. After briefly waking up on the planet, she is forced to undergo decontamination and be taken to a research facility called "Aion Bioengineering Complex". Upon awakening again, she finds herself in surrogate facility and watches her friend get eaten by a dinosaur. Violet arms herself with a knife and a gun and attempts to escape the facility, killing the attacking dinosaurs.

== Development ==
TeamKill Media, an American studio that previously created Quantum Error, announced the development of Code Violet on January 17, 2025, and released an announcement trailer on YouTube. The game was described as a third-person shooter horror game; its launch was scheduled for July 2025. Reportedly, the game was inspired by Dino Crisis, Dead Space and Resident Evil. TeamKill Media had chosen for the game to be released exclusively on PlayStation 5 and sold in PlayStation Store, with no PC version available. The studio said that the reason for this decision was that they wanted to avoid modders creating "vulgar versions" of the game's main character and other characters. The studio also said that it does not want users "tarnishing the reputation" of the characters' voice actors. The statement was posted on X and viewed 1.3 million times. It sparked discussions among users about the decision and criticism of the game and the studio.

The price of the game was reported to be $49.99. In August 2025, TeamKill Media announced that the game's release was delayed due to its clash with the release of Call of Duty: Black Ops 7; the release date was changed to December 12, 2025. The studio said that as a compensation, all players will receive an exclusive Christmas-themed skins of Violet upon the game's release. In December 2025, when the game was about to be released, TeamKill Media announced that it would be delayed again due to technical difficulties with the certification of preorder and deluxe versions of the game. The date was moved to January 10, 2026. Code Violet, as scheduled, was released on January 10, 2026. On January 15, the studio released a patch after receiving negative reviews from players complaining about bugs. The patch fixed combat system, bugged items and softlock situations. The game was patched again on January 19, which changed interface and fixed several bugs.

On February 10, 2026, TeamKill Media described the launch of Code Violet as an "overwhelming success" and announced that the development of the game's sequel, titled Code UltraViolet, has begun. In March 2026, a free DLC for the game was announced; Extinction Gauntlet. Reportedly, the player will be rewarded with infinite ammo cheat, new weapon and a new skin of Violet for completing it.

== Reception ==
Reception

Aggregate scores
Aggregator	Score
Metacritic	29/100
OpenCritic	17% recommend

Review scores
Publication	Score
IGN	4/10
PC Games (DE)	4/10
Push Square	4/10

Code Violet received generally unfavorable reviews from critics, according to the review aggregation website Metacritic. Fellow review aggregator OpenCritic assessed that the game received weak approval, being recommended by 17% of critics.

The release of Code Violet was not well received; it received negative reviews from both critics and players. Jarrett Green of IGN described Code Violet as a "bad game," stating that its characters are "flat" and "empty", including Violet, whom he described as an "empty shell". He rated the game 4 out 10. Rafa Del Río of IGN Spain also rated the game 4 out 10. Dia Lacina of The A.V. Club gave the game F-rating, criticizing its gameplay and story. Michael Gerra-Clarin of Game8 also criticized the game's story, saying that it was poorly written and that none of its characters were likable. He stated that Code Violet is "not worth" the price of $50, rating it 42 out of 100. Saras Rajpal of Final Weapon said Code Violet was the "worst game" he's played, giving it 0.5 stars out of five. He claimed that all characters of the game had no personality and that female characters were "objects" designed for "sex appeal". Kenneth Shepard of Kotaku called the game "awful", along with Quantum Error.

GamingBolt commended the game's visuals and audio design, but criticized Violet as a character, saying that she is "bland" and not relatable. He called the game a "disappointing addition" and rated it 3 out of 10. Men's Journal said that Code Violet isn't a "truly bad game" and that it can be turned into a "worthwhile experience" if the developers patched it. The game was rated 5 out of 10. Logan Moore of ComicBook.com called Code Violet the "worst game of the year" (2026), saying that its one of the lowest-rated games of 2026 and may become the "worst game of this console generation". TheGamer also called Code Violet the worst game of 2026, stating that it received slightly worse score than Highguard. The Escapist said the game has potential and featured some "beautiful segments". It said that the game has the "soul" of Dino Crisis. John McCormick of the Push Square called the game a "mess" that has various problems. He rated the game 4 out 10. The game has a rating of 2.93 on the PlayStation Store based on 1,530 user reviews, with 46% of reviews giving the game one or two stars. On Metacritic, the game received a score of 27/100, based on 14 aggregated reviews, indicating "generally unfavorable reviews".

Addressing negative reviews, TeamKill Media made a statement on social media, saying; “We make games for our fans and players who actually spend their hard earned money on our games and support us, not critics”. The studio said Code Violet became its best-selling game of 2026, achieving high sales and a large player base despite negative reviews. ComicBook.com said that despite negative reception, the game was a financial success and may have developed its own fan base.
