= Scriptorium (disambiguation) =

A scriptorium was a writing room in medieval European monasteries.

Scriptorium may also refer to:

- Scriptorium (website), the digital library of the Cantonal and University Library of Lausanne
- Scriptorium Fonts, a defunct American type foundry
- Scriptorium: Master of Manuscripts, 2026 video game
