= Turmoil =

Turmoil may refer to:

- Turmoil (1984 video game), a platform game
- Turmoil (2016 video game), an oil-tycoon simulation game
- "Turmoil" (Law & Order: Special Victims Unit), a 2009 TV episode
- "Turmoil", a 2024 single by Au5 and Blanke
- Turmoil (SWAT Kats), a character in the TV series SWAT Kats: The Radical Squadron
- Turmoil Point, the westernmost point of Bristol Island in the South Sandwich Islands
- Turmoil Radio, an American punk rock college radio program
- Turmoil Rock, southeast of Table Island in the South Shetland Islands

== See also ==
- The Turmoil (disambiguation)
