= Inosuke =

- Gender: Male
- Language: Japan

Origin
- Origin: Japan

Inosuke (伊之助) is a masculine Japanese given name.

== Notable people with the name ==
- Inosuke Hashibira (嘴平 伊之助), fictional character from the manga Demon Slayer: Kimetsu no Yaiba
- Inosuke Hazama (1895–1977), Japanese painter
- Inosuke Inoue (1882-1966), Japanese Christian missionary to Taiwan

== Other uses of the name ==
- Shikimori Inosuke, a stage name used by sumo gyōji
