= Inosuke Inoue =

Japanese missionary to Taiwanese aboriginal tribes

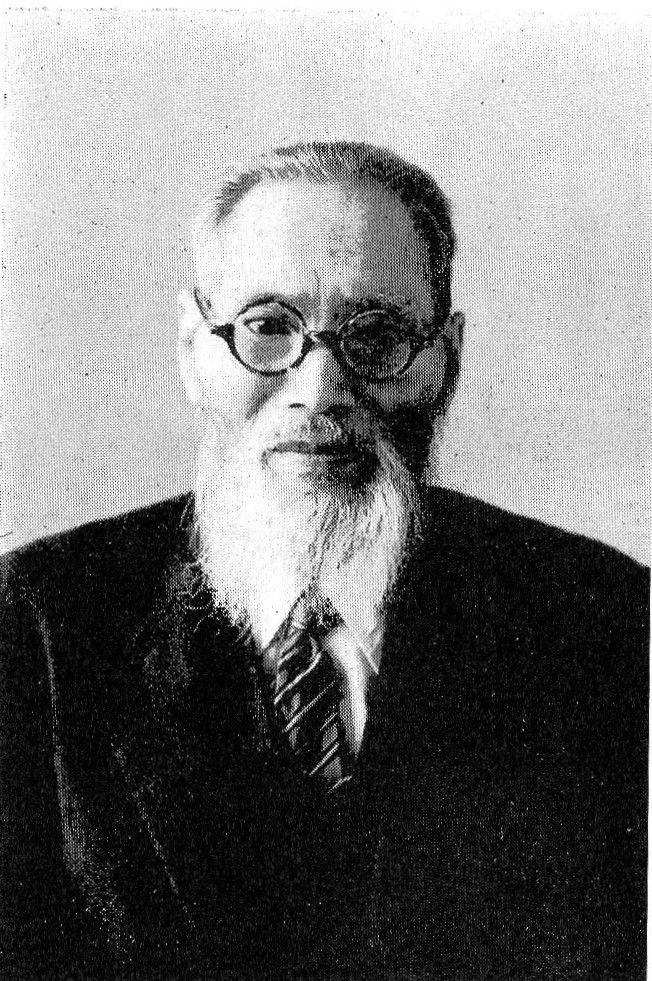
- Born: September 2, 1882
- Died: June 20, 1966 (aged 83)

Inosuke Inoue (September 2, 1882 – June 20, 1966), whose Chinese given name was Gao Tianming, was born in Kochi Prefecture, Japan. In addition to being a Christian clergyman, he also engaged in medical services.

Inosuke Inoue's father, during the early days of Taiwan under Japanese rule, went to Hualien, Taiwan, to engage in camphor harvesting. Later, during the Weili Incident, he and dozens of government officials were killed by the Taroko people. For this reason, after Inosuke graduated from the seminary, he went to Taiwan's aboriginal tribes to carry out missionary and medical work with the concept of education and service. Later, he made many contributions to the medical work of Taiwan's aborigines throughout his life; therefore, he is known as the "Father of Aboriginal Medical Services" in Taiwan. Tzu Chi Monthly called Inoue "revenge with love."

== Father died ==
In 1895, due to the victory in the Sino-Japanese War of 1895-1895, Japan obtained the territory of Taiwan. To obtain colonial economic resources, the Taiwan Governor-General, the highest administrative agency set up by Japan in Taiwan, began large-Government-General of Taiwan. Not only did the Governor-General promulgate the "Rules for the Banning of Government-owned Forestry and Camphor Manufacturing" in the same year, and the "Rules for the Banning of Camphor Business and Camphor Taxation" the following year, a few years later, a camphor bureau was set up under the Government-General's Office to conduct camphor production. Manufacturing and exclusive sales. Among them, camphor wood required for camphor is cultivated and developed in the mountainous areas of western Taiwan and as far away as the Hualien area, where most of the Taiwanese aborigines live.

Although in charge of the camphor monopoly, the Camphor Bureau of the Governor's Office still actively cooperates with companies on the Japanese island. The cooperative companies in the Hualien area include the well-known Japanese private company Kada Group. In the summer of 1906, fierce conflicts broke out in the camphor factory set up by the Hetian Group in Hualien Weilishe. There were fierce battles between the camphor-making workers, mostly Taroko people and the Japanese-dominated employers because of labor disputes. During the battle, a total of 32 Japanese people were killed. Since everyone's head was cut off on the day of the murder, some people believe that one of the causes of the incident was the grass-cutting ceremony held by the residents of the Weili community of the Taroko ethnic group. After liquidation, among the deceased were the Hualien Branch Chief of Police Oyama Juro and Inoue Inosuke's father, Inoue Yanosuke, who worked as a technician in the camphor field.

== Missionary motivation ==
Japanese priest Juji Nakada baptized Inosuke Inoue in June 1903. In September 1905, he entered the Holy Book College of the Oriental Missionary Society. When the news of his father's murder reached Japan, Inosuke, who was studying at the seminary, not only mourned but also thought from the perspective of a religious person. He believed the Taroko people did this because they were not exposed to Christian teachings. Therefore, he came up with the idea of going to Taiwan to preach: "From today on, I will pray for the Taiwanese aborigines every day, praying that someone will preach the gospel to them as soon as possible and become kind people."

== Heading to Taiwan ==
After two years of consideration and prayer, Inoue applied to the Japanese government in 1908 for missionary work in Taiwan's aboriginal areas. However, since the Japanese government's national religion is Shinto, it has no intention of approving Inoue's application to preach.

Despite this setback, Inoue did not give up on preaching. He decided to plan a trip to Taiwan in the name of medical service. To this end, Inosuke began studying medicine and obtained a medical license nine months later. Soon afterward, he finally received approval from the Japanese government and went to Taiwan for medical service in 1911.

Inosuke Inoue, who had just arrived in Taiwan, was ordered to go to the aboriginal tribe in the Zhudong Mountain District of Hsinchu. The first official task the local Hsinchu Office government assigned him, which was engaged in Tibetan affairs, was to "Entrust mountain affairs, appoint the Shuqilin Branch Office, and arrange for the Taiwan Aboriginal Medical Center to serve."

== Medical service ==
In 1911, Inoue went to the Hsinchu Mountain Control Area in Taiwan. His service scope included the Galapai and the Sirak societies, where Atayal people gathered. Suppose a Taiwanese aborigine living in the two communities becomes ill or injured in an accident. In that case, the tribal leaders of the two communities will send Aboriginal soldiers to the stationed medical center to look for him. Because medical services are usually still some distance away from tribal areas in the mountainous areas, Inoue usually needs to hike to the indigenous tribes to receive treatment. In 1917, he had to be transferred back to Japan because he contracted malaria. In 1918, Inoue mentioned in Japan: "In the autumn of that year (1918), a vicious cold (flu) spread all over the world. Many people suffered from it, and even many people died. Unfortunately, a family of five also died. Quan fell ill. After more than a month, although he has recovered slightly, he has adapted to Taiwan's warm climate over the years and has no resistance to the cold, so he wants to go to a warm place." This shows that he misses Taiwan.

In 1922, Inosuke came to Taiwan again and launched medical services in Taiwan's aboriginal areas. In addition to the two tribes mentioned above, the area he serves includes the Baimao Society, Meiyuan Society, Xinwangyang Malieba Society, Bunun Naifenpu Society, and Nama Kabang Society in Taichung Prefecture. The most special ones are, Under the orders of the Governor-General, he went to the Qingliu tribe to treat malaria and trauma for more than 300 locals who survived the Wushe incident. In 1931, he served as a commissioned officer of the Police Division of Nengao County Hall. In 1931, he served as a public physician in Taichung Prefecture. Because of his outstanding achievements in providing medical services to Taiwan's Aborigines, he was later honored as the "Father of Aboriginal Medical Services."

During this period of medical service, Inosuke did not give up his missionary ideals. He applied for Christian missionary work in 1916 and 1926 but was rejected by the competent authorities. However, even so, he still carried out evangelistic work among Taiwan's aboriginal people while carrying out medical work. In 1939, he resigned from his job in the Namakabang tribe and went to Neihu Village on the outskirts of Taipei City to open a hospital. He was also elected as the village coordinator of Neihu Village. Later, he went to a mental sanatorium in Songshan, Taipei, to treat people with mental health conditions.

== Returning to Japan after the war ==
In 1945, the Second World War ended, Japan was defeated and surrendered, and Taiwan entered the Republic of China period. Due to the change of government, the Japanese Inosuke Inoue faced the dilemma of being deported back to Japan. To stay in Taiwan and continue to provide medical services, Inosuke changed his name to Gao Tianming and was appointed by the Health Bureau as Songshan Sanatorium. The following year, he resigned from his job in the sanatorium. He went to Yilan to continue his service as a power generation doctor at Tianpi Institute and continue his preaching work. However, he was soon forced to leave Taiwan due to the turmoil caused by the February 28 Incident.

== Died ==
Inosuke Inoue, who returned to Japan, did not engage in medical services anymore but switched to clergy and teaching.

At 1:40 a.m. on June 20, 1966, he died of encephalomalacia at his home at the foot of Ueno Oji Castle, Nada-ku, Kobe City, Hyogo Prefecture, Japan. The farewell ceremony was held at 2:00 p.m. on June 26 in Kamiyama-cho, Kita-ku, Osaka City. He was held and buried in the Iruma Memorial Cemetery in Saitama Prefecture, Japan. His tombstone was engraved with the significant word "love," and below it was written "トミーヌン‧ウットフ," which is the Atayal "tminun Utux," tminun means "weaving," Utux means "God," tminun Utux means "神わwovenりgive (God is weaving)."

According to Yumi Kojima's research, for the Atayal people, birth is tminun utux (God is weaving), and death is mason tminun utux (God has finished weaving). Inosuke Inoue commented on this during his lifetime: Everything in the universe is the will of God, and humans can do nothing. If the war fails, they say: "God's weaving is not good." When humans are happy and victorious, they say: "God weaves well."Just as a woman weaves fabric, it can be said that God is intricately crafting the course of the world and humanity's journey. What profound and meaningful words! I have fulfilled fifty years of prayers and missions. It is an impossible task for me alone, but through God and the individuals He has chosen, the mission has been accomplished on my behalf. God is in the process of weaving, tminun Utux. I believe God will weave the ethnic groups of Taiwan into something beautiful to rescue and sanctify them in the eyes of the Japanese and the global community.

== Quotation ==
"From today onwards, I am going to pray every day for the aborigines in Taiwan, praying that someone will preach the gospel to them soon and instead become a people of goodness."

"I don't know how long it will take for the aboriginal people of Taiwan to stop killing people's heads, and I pray that through the power of God the Father, they will repent from this horrible and great sin and become good people as soon as possible."

"If the locals of Taiwan, who in the eyes of the world are considered to be the same as wild animals, are also honorable human beings made in the image of God, I am sure that God will save them...I must do it so that others can recognize God's presence in the faces of the locals."

"Now faced with the situation of not being able to preach publicly, what can I preach to those around me? Only by my daily prayers and deeds."
