= The Turmoil =

The Turmoil may refer to:

- The Turmoil (novel), a 1915 novel by Booth Tarkington
- The Turmoil (1916 film), an American silent film based on the novel
- The Turmoil (1924 film), an American silent film based on the novel

== See also ==
- Turmoil (disambiguation)
