= Lake (video game) =

2021 video game

- Cover art featuring (clockwise from center) Meredith, Robert, Lori, Kay, and Angie
- Developer: Gamious
- Publisher: Whitethorn Games
- Director: Dylan Nagel
- Producer: Eva Nieuwdorp
- Designers: Dylan Nagel; Jos Bouman
- Programmer: Luc Schols
- Artists: Jonathan van Immerzeel; Sonja van Vuure
- Writer: Jos Bouman
- Engine: Unity
- Platforms: Windows; Xbox One; Xbox Series X/S; PlayStation 4; PlayStation 5; Stadia; Nintendo Switch
- Release: Windows, XONE, XSXS; September 1, 2021; PS4, PS5; April 8, 2022; Stadia; June 1, 2022; Nintendo Switch; February 15, 2024
- Genre: Graphic adventure
- Mode: Single-player

Lake is a 2021 graphic adventure game developed by Gamious and published by Whitethorn Games. Set in 1986, the story follows Meredith Weiss, a software developer who spends two weeks in her hometown of Providence Oaks, Oregon, where she temporarily assumes the role of the town's mail carrier. The player interacts with residents while delivering mail to them. The game presents dialogue options which influence the events of the story and its ending.

The four-year development began in 2017 after director Dylan Nagel pitched the concept to Gamious. The setting was chosen for its aesthetics, while the time period was selected as it offered a nostalgic and relatable feeling. The world and characters were inspired by several American sitcoms and actors, and research was conducted into narrative-focused adventure games. The development team performed extensive research of Oregon for the game's setting.

Lake was first showcased in 2018. It was released for Windows, the Xbox One, and Xbox Series X/S in September 2021, for the PlayStation 4 and PlayStation 5 in April 2022, for Stadia in June 2022, and for the Nintendo Switch in February 2024. It received mixed reviews, with praise for its world, characters, and performances; critics were divided on the repetitive gameplay and soundtrack. A downloadable content prequel following Meredith's father at Christmas was released in November 2023.

== Gameplay ==
In Lake, the player drives and delivers mail to the community of Providence Oaks.

Lake is a graphic adventure game played from a third-person perspective. The player controls Meredith Weiss, who returns to her hometown of Providence Oaks, Oregon, to work as a mail delivery driver. The player traverses the world by foot or by driving the mail van. Each day begins at the post office, and the player may freely explore locations in Providence Oaks while completing a predetermined number of deliveries, including packages and letters of correspondence, before returning to the post office. A mini-map is used for navigation.

Letters are stored in Meredith's mail bag and delivered to a house's mailbox, while packages are stored in the van's tailgate and delivered to a house's front door, which may prompt a conversation with its non-player character occupants. In these interactions, the player can choose to complete additional tasks throughout the town and organize after-work or weekend activities with other townspeople, including romantic relationships. Alternatively, the player can choose to complete additional work for Meredith's employer in the evenings or relax by reading or watching television or a movie. Branching dialogue choices are occasionally presented during conversations, which may influence the nature and tone of Meredith's relationships and ultimately impact the ending.

== Plot ==
On September 1, 1986, software developer Meredith Weiss returns to her hometown of Providence Oaks after 20 years and stays at her parents' residence while they are away on a holiday trip, intending to take a short break from her hectic career at an American software company. To pass the time, she fills in for her father Thomas, the local mail carrier, for two weeks. Meredith may interact with the town's residents during her time in Providence Oaks, including her father's colleague Frank Coleman, the local postmaster; her estranged childhood best friend Kay Evans; Kay's aunt Maureen Hennessy, the proprietor of the local diner; the elderly Mildred Jenkins, who keeps many cats; and Lori Young, the local mechanic's daughter. Meredith may establish a romantic relationship with one of two love interests: Angie Eastman, the owner of a VHS rental shop; and Robert Harris, a lumberjack and environmental activist.

By the game's end, the player must decide whether Meredith will stay in Providence Oaks and take over her father's position permanently, or accept a partnership offer from her boss Steve Mitchell in the software company and return to her life in the big city. Each of these main endings has several versions, depending on the player's choices, including Meredith's romantic relationship. A third main ending becomes available if the player's choices led to Meredith owning an RV: if Meredith is in a relationship with Angie, the couple can depart from Providence Oaks and commit to an itinerant lifestyle.

== Development ==
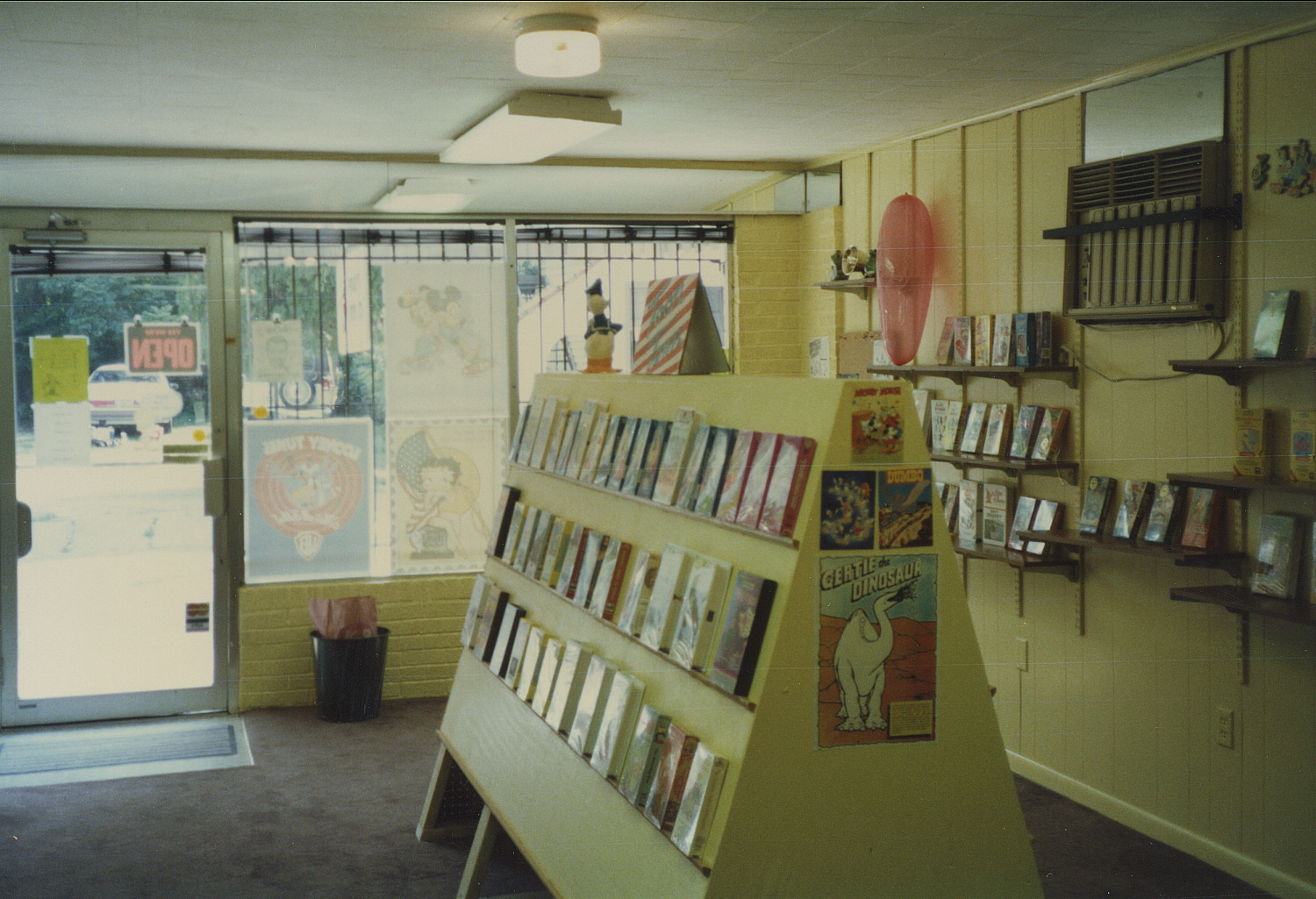
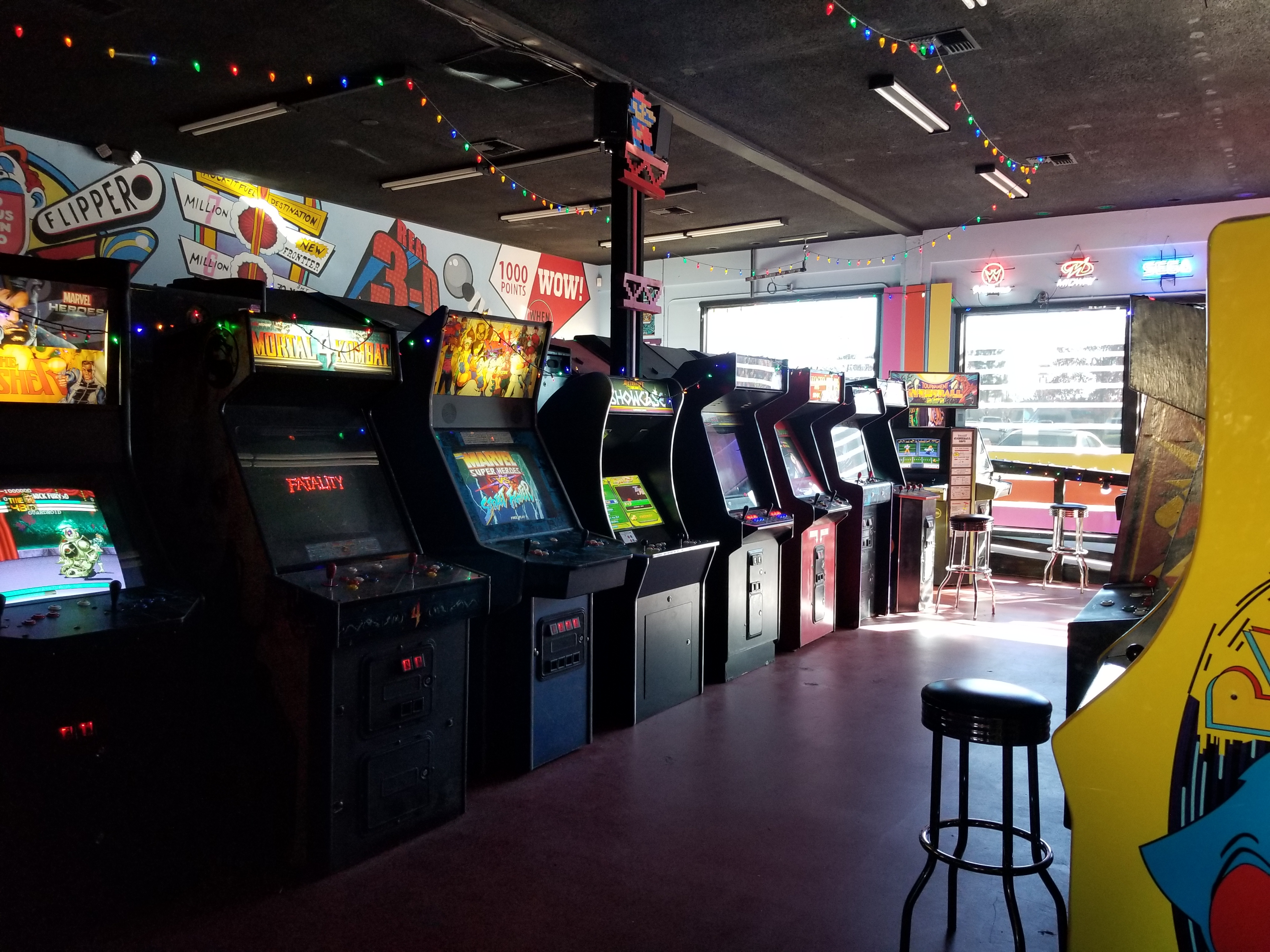
The development team's nostalgia for diners, VHS movies, and arcade machines contributed to Lake's 1986 setting.

Lake was developed by Dutch company Gamious. In 2017, studio founders Pim and Jos Bouman invited freelance game developer Dylan Nagel to pitch game ideas to the team. After two unsuccessful concepts—a dungeon-set puzzle game and a space game with branching narratives—Nagel pitched Lake with a picture of a car driving around a lake. The idea resonated with the team, and they found using a mail truck justified the gameplay concept of driving around and meeting people. They crafted a game design document shortly thereafter, outlining the concept and potential gameplay ideas. Research was conducted into adventure games focusing on narrative, such as Alan Wake, Firewatch, and Gone Home.

A small team was formed to flesh out the concept in November 2017, and artists, animators, programmers, and a producer were added over time. The team aimed to complete the game within 18 months, though development ultimately took almost four years. Several titles were considered; Lake received no objections due to its "simple and carefree vibe". Most important creative choices had been decided before the COVID-19 pandemic in 2020, allowing the team to shift to remote work with few difficulties. They found the pandemic increased demand for a relaxing experience.

Game development management software Articy Draft was used to create the narrative with its branching options. The writers crafted a simple story to allow the player to enjoy their time in the world. They wanted the player to feel in control of the story as opposed to simply witnessing it, allowing them to opt in to tasks without feeling stressed, partly achieved by isolating characters to individual stories. Lead writer Jos Bouman sought each action to feel significant regardless of their results due to the quietness and immersion of the world, and wanted the dilemmas to feel complex without correct answers. He felt most players could resonate with Meredith and Kay's relationship as "most people have grown apart from friends they knew back in the day".

Several characters were physically based on blends of famous actors, such as George Carlin, Bill Murray, Hailee Steinfeld, and Betty White. Bouman cited American sitcoms Cheers, Northern Exposure, and Seinfeld as inspirations for their balance between comedy and personal stories. The team wanted to present Lake as a laid-back, relaxing video game experience with a sincere and mature narrative; Bouman called it "anti-GTA" due to its lack of confrontation or stakes. He described it as "a game about nothing" that is relatable to players as a slice of life.

The team chose 1986 for the setting as it offered a relatable, nostalgic feeling and avoided modern troubles from mobile phones and the internet. Several team members grew up in the 1980s and considered diners, VHS movies, and arcade machines particularly nostalgic and recognizable. The team found a modern setting would not justify regular meetups with friends due to the prevalence of social media messaging. Bouman considered the mini-map an acceptable video game convention that did not "feel like it's cheating", despite being inconsistent with the setting's era. Parody versions of VHS tape covers received positive feedback in demonstrations of the game, prompting character art director Sonja van Vuure to create more for the final version.

The team considered different locations for the game, including Canada or Scandinavia, but found they would be less familiar for the player. The states of Idaho, Montana, and Wyoming were considered, but Oregon was ultimately chosen for its aesthetics; Nagel had lived in Beaverton for 18 months in the early 2000s. The team felt they were familiar with Oregon and the Pacific Northwest through media like First Blood, Gilmore Girls, and Twin Peaks, and figured players would similarly be familiar as consumers of American popular culture. Technical environment artist Jonathan van Immerzeel performed extensive research through Google Maps and books about trees in the region. United States-based publisher Whitethorn Games reviewed the dialogue to ensure it sounded authentic. The game was built using the game engine Unity. Van Immerzeel used several Unity tools in development, such as World Creator for the landscape and Vegetation Studio for the environment. The game uses a proprietary lighting system with the goal to create a natural look while maintaining artistic control.

== Release and promotion ==
Lake was first showcased through a playable demo at the Dutch game convention Indigo in 2018, after about six months of development. It was playable at AdventureX in November 2018. A trailer was shown during the Guerrilla Collective in June 2020, carrying a Q4 2020 release date; Bouman predicted a delay due to the amount of work involved. Whitethorn Games demonstrated a trailer during its digital presentation in March 2021, and the game was showcased at LudoNarraCon in April. A demo was available in June 2021 as part of Steam Next Fest and Summer Game Fest. During the Wholesome Direct at E3 in June 2021, Gamious announced Lake would be released for Windows, the Xbox One, and Xbox Series X/S on September 1, 2021.

The game was originally refused classification on Xbox in Australia due to a scene involving drug use following submission through the International Age Rating Coalition, preventing its sale. After conversations between the developers and Australian Classification Board, the game received an R18+ rating. Lake was available through Xbox Game Pass from December 2021 to December 2022. The game was released for the PlayStation 4 and PlayStation 5 on April 8, 2022; a physical version was distributed by Perp Games, featuring a map of Providence Oaks. In partnership with Eden Reforestation Projects, Perp Games pledged to plant two trees for every copy sold. The game was released for Stadia on June 1, 2022.

In June 2023, Gamious announced a downloadable content expansion, Season's Greetings, set nine months before the main story, following Meredith's father Thomas at Christmas. It was released on November 15, 2023. The team sought to ensure an authentic winter feeling with sound and visual effects responding to snow. The base game was released for the Nintendo Switch on February 15, 2024. Endless Mode, allowing continuous gameplay without any story or dialogue, was added to Windows in April, and to PlayStation and Xbox versions in August alongside an update allowing players to pet cats.

== Reception ==
Reception

Aggregate scores
Aggregator	Score
Metacritic	PS5: 77/100; XONE: 73/100; XSXS: 71/100; Win: 70/100
OpenCritic	40% recommend

Review scores
Publication	Score
Adventure Gamers	4/5
Destructoid	7.5/10
Jeuxvideo.com	13/20
NME	4/5
Push Square	6/10
RPGFan	73/100
The Games Machine (Italy)	9/10
The Guardian	3/5
Gayming Magazine	5/5

Lake received "mixed or average" reviews for most platforms according to review aggregator website Metacritic, while the PlayStation 5 version received "generally favorable" reviews, and the game has a 40% approval rating on OpenCritic. The New Yorker's Simon Parkin listed it among the best games of 2021. It received two nominations at the Gayming Awards: Best LGBTQ Indie Game and Best LGBTQ Character for Meredith. In March 2022, Bouman said the game had been profitable.

Adventure Gamers's Peter Mattsson found the gameplay "ideal for anyone who just needs an opportunity to catch their breath", comparing it to his experiences with country driving. Some reviewers considered the experience relaxing, but felt it became too repetitive, particularly due to Meredith's slow movement; Push Square's Liam Croft wrote it was "too shallow from start to finish". Gamepressure's Giancarlo Saldana was disappointed by the omission of some animations, such as entering and exiting the van. Several reviewers encountered glitches, with some requiring the game to be reloaded.

Several critics considered the narrative simplistic but effective. RPGFan's Caitlin Argyros found it "a bit dull" but acknowledged the uniqueness of its lack of grandeur. NME's Hirun Cryer praised the "brilliant branching narrative pathways", and Eurogamer's Emad Ahmed wanted more character interactions. Push Square's Croft considered the story an effective palate cleanser in contrast to "heavier" games, though found its simplicity limited its potential. Adventure Gamers's Mattsson considered the narrative "memorable, delightful, and at times profound" and praised its impartiality regarding Meredith's final decision. Conversely, Destructoid's Zoey Handley felt it pressured the player into choosing to stay, removing their agency. Jeuxvideo.com's Pauline Leclercq found the narrative authentic but the conclusion predictable.

Lake received attention for its depiction of the same-sex relationship between Meredith and Angie, and it was nominated for two Gayming Awards.

Some journalists highlighted the handling of midlife crisis as a major narrative theme; Kotaku Australia's David Smith wrote it "kickstarted" his midlife crisis and prompted him to consider small-town living. Destructoid's Handley felt her criticisms of the game largely reflected her experience growing up in a small town. Gayming Magazine's Aimee Hart called the game "undeniably queer" and praised its depiction of queerness in a small town in the 1980s. Paste's Grace Benfell bemoaned the story's political avoidance, such as the lack of discussion about the AIDS epidemic despite highlighting queer characters, and the criticism of capitalism without representative characters and experiences.

The voice performances were praised by reviewers. Jeuxvideo.com's Leclercq felt they provided life to otherwise devoid characters. Eurogamer's Ahmed considered Meredith "one of the most memorable, fully-fleshed out video game characters" of the year and found himself "unusually invested" in the lives of the community. Several critics similarly enjoyed the characters. NME's Cryer felt their personalities invited the player to return to them frequently. Conversely, RPGFan's Argyros found some characters' stories too random, and lamented their lack of development.

The Guardian's Keza MacDonald lauded the effort put into creating the world, describing it as "a good-looking place to drive around for a few hours". Adventure Gamers's Mattsson praised the cel-shaded graphics for appearing both realistic and handmade. RPGFan's Argyros enjoyed the visuals and town, but found the animations awkward and lamented the lack of detailed facial animations. Several reviewers enjoyed the selection of radio station music for complementing the gameplay, though some criticized its repetitiveness and lack of variety. Destructoid's Handley preferred to play without music due to her aversion to country pop songs. GamesRadar+'s Heather Wald praised Season's Greetings for adding Christmas atmosphere to the idyllic town.
