= Olija =

- Developer: Skeleton Crew Studio
- Publisher: Devolver Digital
- Platforms: Microsoft Windows; Nintendo Switch; PlayStation 4; Xbox One; Amazon Luna
- Release: Windows, Switch, PlayStation 4, Xbox One; January 28, 2021; Luna; October 28, 2021
- Genre: Platform
- Mode: Single-player

Olija is a platform video game developed by Skeleton Crew Studio and published by Devolver Digital. The game was released in January 2021 for Windows, PlayStation 4, Nintendo Switch and Xbox One, and for Amazon Luna in October 2021.

== Plot ==
The game's protagonist, Faraday, is a penniless lord of a fishing village, who after years of bad catches, decides to take a ship and seek "salvation" for the village. A whale chases after the ship in a storm and destroys it. Faraday wakes up on a fog covered beach and finds the remains of his crew. Venturing into a cave, he is attacked by mysterious creatures. In the cave Faraday takes an ancient compass, but a monster chases him out, and he survives by jumping through a window.

Faraday again wakes up, this time on a boat with the Boatman. He takes Faraday to Oaktide which is made up of marooned ships from other castaways. There Faraday sees the travelers, merchants and sailors that also were caught in storms past, eventually giving up hope of ever returning home. In a cabin, he finds a map, which allows the boatman to find new locations to take him across the islands.

Along his journey, Faraday finds the Shadow Gate, which if he collects all keys required to unlock it, will let him return home.

== Gameplay ==
Olija is a 2D side-scrolling platform game with 8-bit pixelated graphics. The player assumes control of a man named Faraday who is stranded on an archipelago named Terraphage following a shipwreck. He must explore the islands to find survivors and find new maps and keys to unlock new areas of the map. Faraday is equipped with a magical harpoon, which allows the player to teleport short distances. The harpoon can be used as a tool for navigating the world, and also a weapon to defeat enemies. In the game, players can craft hats, which grant Faraday special perks and powers.

== Development ==
The game was developed by a one-man Japanese company named Skeleton Crew Studios. The studio's founder, Thomas Olsson, was responsible for most of the game's development from programming to designing the game. He also collaborated with a Japanese saxophonist, a shakuhachi player, and his wife when composing the music for the game. Moby Dick, Pirates of the Caribbean, and Prince of Persia were major sources of inspiration during the game's development. The story was written late in the game's development, with Olsson adding that it was "improvised" and "made on the fly".

Olsson partnered with independent game publisher Devolver Digital for the game's release. It was first revealed on July 12, 2020, and a playable demo was released on the same day. The game was released on January 28, 2021, for Windows, PlayStation 4, Xbox One and Nintendo Switch, and for Amazon Luna on October 28, 2021.

== Reception ==
Reception

Aggregate score
Aggregator	Score
Metacritic	(PC) 77/100 (PS4) 78/100 (NS) 78/100 (XONE) 79/100

Review scores
Publication	Score
Eurogamer	Recommended
Game Informer	8.5/10
GameSpot	8/10
IGN	7/10
Nintendo Life	7/10
PC Gamer (UK)	83/100
The Guardian	4/5

The game received generally positive reviews upon release, according to review aggregator Metacritic.

Game Informer liked the animation of Olija, saying its "smooth animation that evokes classics like Prince of Persia and Another World". While liking the 8-bit artstyle aesthetically, Nintendo Life found it to be hard to distinguish enemy types from each other, describing the process as "more of a crapshoot". Eurogamer praised the harpoon, feeling it worked well for both "traversal and combat", and that the game's puzzles and levels worked perfectly with the mechanic.

Overall enjoying the mobility that it offered, PC Gamer felt the control system for the harpoon could be confusing with how the player had to use two separate inputs, describing it as "easy to spam the button and find yourself fighting without the harpoon". The Guardian liked the combat, praising the weapons available and the animation for each, "Enemies are sent flying by powerful strikes, thunking satisfyingly to the floor or into walls, sometimes rising again before you use the harpoon to fly towards them for a finisher".

GameSpot praised the story, especially the characters and the connections they made, saying they were "roughly drawn and very pixelated, but they build strong bonds that resonate and create real stakes". The Verge enjoyed the atmosphere of the world, describing it as a "cross between Lovecraft-style ancient terrors and Japanese folklore". IGN disliked the limited mobility of enemies, saying the enemies had no real way to combat how the main character could move with the harpoon, giving the player "not much incentive to really explore the depth of the combat".
