= DwarfHeim =

2021 cooperative real-time strategy video game

Dwarfheim
- Developer: Pineleaf Studio
- Publisher: Merge Games
- Engine: Unity
- Platform: Windows
- Release: September 27, 2021
- Genre: Real-time strategy
- Modes: Single-player, multiplayer

DwarfHeim was a cooperative real-time strategy video game created by Trondheim-based developer Pineleaf Studio, and published by Merge Games on September 27, 2021. Set in a fantasy word inhabited by dwarves and trolls, the game split resource gathering, base building, and army management between up to three players. A commercial failure, DwarfHeim left its development studio bankrupt. The game's servers shut down on November 30, 2023, rendering the game inaccessible.

== Gameplay ==
DwarfHeim featured traditional base building, resource gathering, and combat similar to that of WarCraft III. In regular matches and skirmishes, the gameplay was split between three players, with vacant slots being filled by the game's AI. One player primarily built structures on the surface which were used to gather resources, research new technologies, and train troops. Another player mined resources underground, and processed them with contraptions similar to those in Factorio. The last player trained and controlled combat troops. Troops were used to hunt trolls to gain additional resources, capture control nodes on the map that convey bonuses to their owners, and secure victory by destroying the opposing team's headquarters.

In survival mode, players would attempt to survive as long as possible against waves of trolls. If played alone, players would control all three aspects of the game. Additionally, there was also a sandbox mode with no opposing team intended to ease new players into the game. A campaign was planned as well, but never released.

In all modes, players had access to a hero unit with special abilities that supported whatever role a player fills. Heroes gained levels and new abilities in combat. If killed, they would respawn at the headquarters after a cooldown period.

== Development ==
DwarfHeim was intended to be revealed at E3 2020, but after the event was cancelled due to the COVID-19 pandemic, the game was presented as part of the "Guerilla Collective" announcement stream instead. At the same time, beta sign-ups for DwarfHeim started. The game's multiplayer mode was showcased at PAX X EGX 2020, where the developers also announced a demo, as well as a transition to Steam Early Access for October. The game was also to receive a "friend pass" feature, allowing owners to have others join them without those DwarfHeim themselves. This was implemented in December.

The game was released on September 27, 2021. A few months later, Pineleaf Studio declared bankruptcy. In an interview with MN24, the studio's general manager Linn Søvig stated that only 30,000 people had bought the game, with 100,000 having wishlisted DwarfHeim prior to its release. The game's servers were shut down at the end of November 2023, rendering the game unplayable.

== Reception ==
Nate Crowley of Rock Paper Shotgun had high expectations for the game upon watching its trailer, stating that DwarfHeim could have the potential to reinvent the real-time strategy genre. He retained his positive opinion of the game upon playing it. The Indie Game Website had a positive impression of DwarfHeim during its early access period, calling it simple but fun and giving it a score of 7/10. Writing for Gamereactor, Ben Lyons was likewise positive of the game's early access version, but pointed out that the developers had to iron out a number of flaws prior to its full release.
