= Skald: Against the Black Priory =

2024 video game

- Developer: High North Studios
- Publisher: Raw Fury Games
- Engine: Unity
- Platforms: macOS; Windows
- Release: WW: May 30, 2024
- Genre: Role-playing
- Mode: Single-player

Skald: Against the Black Priory is a 2024 role-playing video game developed by High North Studios and published by Raw Fury Games. It has a retro style influenced by the 1980s Ultima games. Players attempt to find a lost friend in a cursed land overrun with Lovecraftian monsters. The game generally received mixed-to-positive reviews, with general praise for the aesthetics and retro feel, though with some criticism for the combat and readability of the graphics.

== Plot ==
=== Setting ===
The main character of Skald is a custom character created by the player, a child of a noble family's man-at-arms who was exiled and later died. The player is then called back to lead a search-and-rescue mission for the noble family's head, who is seeking their missing daughter, Embla, a mage who travelled to the mysterious Outer Isles for reasons unknown. As the player travels the Outer Isles, they are joined by a variety of playable allies.

=== Plot summary ===
Skald follows a custom player character who embarks on a voyage to the Outer Isles, a land slowly being corrupted by Lovecraftian forces. With their ship destroyed by a kraken-like beast, the player must wander the Isles in search of their assigned target - the rescue of their childhood friend who was last seen in the isles.

== Gameplay ==
Skald is inspired by 1980s role-playing games, such as the Ultima series. It features a pixel art aesthetic and a dark fantasy setting inspired by Lovecraftian horror. Both the main character and recruitable characters can be customized through skills, some of which are available to multiple classes. Up to six characters can be in the party.

Party members can be removed or changed with another character at camp. While camping, party members are given various tasks. Characters can cook ingredients that they find, which will heal them when eaten. Potions can also be crafted. Both potions and food can optionally be disabled.

Combat is turn-based and tactical. Characters block each other, though some perks can be used to switch places with someone else without consuming turns. Terrain can also block progress. Characters can only attack in the four cardinal directions, not diagonally, and there is a focus on positioning, which for an example can allow rogues to backstab enemies.

During conversations, characters can utilize skill checks, such as negotiating to get a better reward, with many conversations requiring certain stats for certain outcomes. Characters can also use skills to perform various actions, such as stealing items from a shop.

== Development ==
Developer High North Studios is based in Norway. Raw Fury Games released Skald: Against the Black Priory for macOS and Windows on May 30, 2024.

== Reception ==
Reception

Aggregate score
Aggregator	Score
Metacritic	76/100

Review scores
Publication	Score
RPGFan	89/100
TouchArcade	80/100

Skald: Against the Black Priory received "generally favorable" reviews from critics, earning an average score of 76 out of 100 based on 13 critic reviews, according to the review aggregation website Metacritic.

Rock Paper Shotgun enjoyed how it modernized 1980s-era game design. Though they experienced several bugs, they gave Skald an enthusiastic recommendation, saying that its charm overwhelmed the minor annoyances they encountered. PC Gamer praised how the horror atmosphere intruded on a typical fantasy world, turning it occasionally surprising and disturbing. Eurogamer said that it "exudes grisly character" but felt it did not offer anything beyond what other retro role-playing games did. They also found the combat occasionally frustrating because of the indistinct pixel art and limited potential for positioning.

Slant Magazine and RPG Fan felt that the retro aesthetics hampered the user interface. Slant also felt combat was imbalanced, making some game mechanics less relevant once characters became very powerful, especially in regards to the "ballooning health and mana bars". However, they enjoyed the story and said that Skald builds upon its influences in interesting, new ways, giving the game a score of 3.5 stars out of 5. RPGFan praised its graphics, atmosphere, and story. Despite some bugs, which they said were being worked on, they said recommended it as a nostalgic role-playing game that channels various Commodore 64 games from the 1980s. PCGamesN felt the combat eventually became a chore, especially given what they felt was a lack of balance. They said this resulted in repetitively choosing the best option rather than exploring alternatives, even on higher difficulty levels. However, they enjoyed the quests and lore, and they said they would eagerly play a sequel that fixed some of the issues they had.

Swen Vincke, founder of Larian Studios, praised the game.
