= Gamious =

American video game developer

- Industry: Video games
- Founded: February 2011; 14 years ago
- Founders: Pim Bouman; Jos Bouman
- Headquarters: Haarlem, Netherlands
- Website: gamious.com

Gamious is a Dutch video game developer and publisher founded in Haarlem, Netherlands, in February 2011.

== History ==
Gamious was founded in 2011 by Pim and Jos Bouman. They created a platform called the "Game Train" to collaborate with other game developers. The Game Train enabled freelancing game developers to work with Gamious to create games. Gamious would publish and market the game, and share the revenue with the developers. Gamious had a database of over 400 people working on 21 projects. Gamious eventually dropped the Game Train as they felt that it was too much for them and gave back the titles to their respective owners.

Some Game Train games were developed further, and became some of Gamious's early released Briquid and iO.

== Games ==
Title	Year	Genre	Platforms
Briquid	2013	Puzzle	Windows, iOS, Android
iO	2014	Platformer	Windows, macOS, Linux, iOS, Android
Briquid Mini	2014	Puzzle	Windows, iOS
Lines	2015	Puzzle	Windows, macOS, Linux, iOS, Android
Turmoil	2016	Simulation	Windows, macOS, Linux, iOS
Sprawl	2016	Puzzle	iOS, Android
Turnbased Templars	2016	Turn-based strategy	Android
Team Racing League	2017	Racing	Windows, macOS, Linux
Lake	2021	Narrative-adventure	PC, Xbox Series X/S, Xbox One, PS4, PS5
Words in Progress	Upcoming	Word game	Mobile

== Awards ==
Year	Award	Nominee	Category	Result	Ref.
2013	Dutch Game Awards	Briquid	Best Mobile Game	Nominated	
2013	Dutch Game Awards	Gamious	Industry Award	Nominated	
2014	European Innovative Games Award	iO	Overall	Shortlisted	
2014	Dutch Game Awards	iO	Overall	Honorable Mention	
2014	IndieCade	iO	Overall	Finalist	
2015	GDC	iO	Best In Play	Honorable Mention	
2015	Dutch Game Awards	Lines	Best Casual Game	Won	
2016	International Mobile Gaming Awards	Lines	Best Quickplay Game	Nominated	
