= Giraffe and Annika =

2020 video game

- Developer: Atelier Mimina
- Publishers: Playism (Win); NIS America (PS4, Switch); Koei Tecmo Games (Xbox)
- Director: Atsushi Saito
- Programmer: Atsushi Saito
- Writer: Atsushi Saito
- Platforms: Windows; PlayStation 4; Xbox One; Nintendo Switch
- Release: February 17, 2020 (Win); August 25, 2020 (PS4, Switch); August 27, 2020 (Xbox)
- Genres: Action-adventure; Rhythm game
- Mode: single-player

Giraffe and Annika is an action-adventure and rhythm video game hybrid from independent developer by Atelier Mimina and published by Playism, NIS America, and Koei Tecmo Games. It released on February 17, 2020, for Windows, August 25, 2020, for PlayStation 4 and Nintendo Switch, and August 27, 2020, for Xbox One. The game revolves around Annika, a catgirl who finds herself stranded on the island of Spica with amnesia. She must recover her memories with the help of a boy named Giraffe by finding three special star fragments. The game uses a pacifist battle system where fights are done through rhythm based action.

Giraffe and Annika received mixed reviews from critics, who praised its visuals, story and battle system, but criticized the game's short length and "bland" design.

== Reception ==
Giraffe and Annika received an aggregate score of 67/100 for the Windows version, 70/100 for the PlayStation 4 version, and 64/100 for the Switch version on Metacritic.

Alex Fuller of RPGamer rated the PlayStation 4 version 3.5/5, calling it a "wholesome game that feels ideal for kids" or anyone seeking to relax, and calling it "incredibly adorable". He praised the game's manga presentation for cutscenes and its rhythm-based battles, but said it would have been better if they made up a larger part of the game. Ultimately saying the game did not have much depth, he called it better than the sum of its parts.

Stuart Gipp of Nintendo Life similarly rated the game's Switch version 7/10 stars, calling the game's world "laid-back and attractive" and the soundtrack "Ghibli-esque". Calling the game "chill", he noted that it was very difficult to die. Describing the game's story as "interesting and emotional", he said that while he had a good time playing the game, it was not challenging enough, also calling the character's movement "loose and unwieldy".

Jordan Rudek of Nintendo World Report rated the Switch version 5.5/10. Calling the core gameplay "shallow and boring", he also stated that the game's setting was "forgettable", with "simplistic graphics" that looked better in screenshots. While praising the story panels and rhythm sections, he called the rest of the game lackluster, saying that he was not sure of the game's intended audience.
