= Minute of Islands =

2021 video game

- Developer: Studio Fizbin
- Publisher: Mixtvision
- Platforms: Windows; Switch; PlayStation 4; Xbox One
- Release: Windows, Switch, PS4; June 13, 2021; Xbox One; June 15, 2021
- Genre: Puzzle-platform
- Mode: Single-player

Minute of Islands is a 2021 puzzle-platform game developed by Studio Fizbin and published by Mixtvision for MacOS, Microsoft Windows, Nintendo Switch, PlayStation 4 and Xbox One.

== Gameplay ==
Mo interacting with an object in the game.

The player plays as Mo, a mechanic who is tasked with saving the world by restoring engines on an archipelago. The player moves around the 2D world, and can climb and jump up objects. The player can use a tool, the Omni Switch, which allows Mo to use mechanisms and solve puzzles. The tool also can show the player the direction they need to go to next. The game also has collectibles hidden around the islands, which reveal more about the world and story.

== Reception ==
Reception

Aggregate score
Aggregator	Score
Metacritic	PC: 73/100; PS4: 70/100

Review scores
Publication	Score
Adventure Gamers	5/5
Edge	6/10
Hardcore Gamer	3/5
Push Square	7/10

In a positive review for Rock Paper Shotgun, Alice Bell praised the themes of the story, "But for all its narrative bluntness, Minute Of Islands is an incredibly elegant game. Much more so than the most other indie games that are about death and grief and sadness and responsibility." Malindy Hetfeld, writing for Eurogamer, criticized Minute of Islands' gameplay, writing "Unfortunately, it feels just as unexciting to play... overall these sequences are so simple and so short that there isn't anything remotely rousing to the exercise."

Pocket Tactics liked the soundtrack of the game, feeling it gave it a foreboding atmosphere, "Consisting mostly of eerie mechanical noises offset against the echoing sounds of the ocean and scavenger birds that inhabit the islands, it creates a unique, almost anti-music backdrop". Polygon enjoyed how the game's cartoon-inspired artstyle conflicted with its darker tone, "The darkness of Minute of Islands is punctuated by its light and airy art style; it's a colorful, cartoon world that, from afar, looks like a place I'd love to live in... But examining the details uncovers a darker truth, from those bloodied birds and violent-yet-beautiful fungus".
