= The Waylanders =

2020 video game

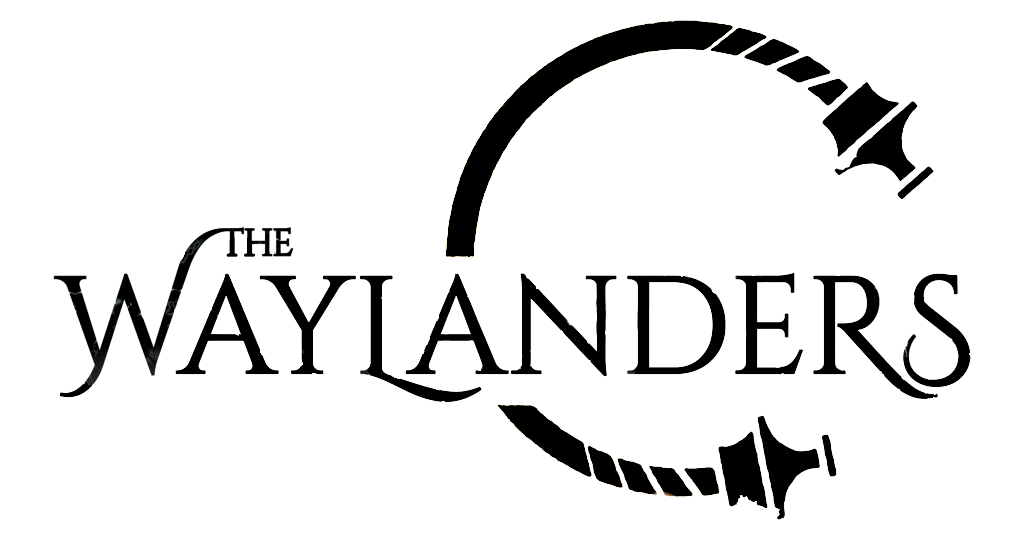
- Developer: Gato Studio
- Director: Sergio Prieto
- Producer: Fernando Prieto
- Composer: Inon Zur
- Platform: Microsoft Windows
- Release: NA: February 2, 2022
- Genre: Role-playing
- Mode: Single-player

The Waylanders is a role-playing video game developed by Spanish team Gato Studio. It was released in early access for Microsoft Windows on June 16, 2020, with the full version of the game released on February 2, 2022. The game is played from a third-person perspective that can be shifted to a top-down perspective.

== Gameplay ==
The Waylanders is a role-playing video game played from a third-person perspective and isometric camera view. It is a real-time combat game with tactical pause option. The battle mode has 12 different combat formations.

Set in the mythological kingdom of Kaltia (based on Galicia, mixing Galician and Celtic mythology), the game puts the player in the role of a warrior, guardian, explorer, mage, healer or rogue coming from a human, Mouro, Fomorian or werewolf background. In addition to choosing the character's class and race, players can mark their origin by choosing from a Celtic soldier, Celtic druid, Egyptian, Moure diplomat, Moure protector, Ares hound mercenary, alpha wolf, and slave. Throughout the game, players encounter various companions, who play major roles in the game's plot and gameplay.

== Development ==
The Waylanders is developed by Spanish developer Gato Studio. The game is inspired by Baldur's Gate and Dragon Age: Origins. It was released on Steam Early Access in Q2 2020. The full version of the game was released on February 2, 2022.

== Reception ==
Reception

Aggregate score
Aggregator	Score
Metacritic	PC: 53/100

The Waylanders received "mixed or average" reviews from professional media, according to review aggregator Metacritic. Metacritic listed The Waylanders as the eighth-worst game of 2022. Rock, Paper, Shotgun described the game as "endearing as it is janky" and hoped for bug fixing patches.
