= Blizzard Boston =

American video game developer

- Formerly: Proletariat, Inc. (2012-2022)
- Type: Subsidiary
- Industry: Video games
- Founded: 2012; 14 years ago
- Founder: Seth Sivak
- Headquarters: Boston, Massachusetts, U.S.
- Area served: Worldwide
- Products: Spellbreak; World of Warcraft
- Number of employees: 120+ (2021)
- Parent: Blizzard Entertainment (2022–present)

Blizzard Boston (formerly Proletariat, Inc.) is an American video game developer based in Boston, Massachusetts. It was founded by Seth Sivak and former Zynga industry veterans in 2012. The company was acquired by Blizzard Entertainment in 2022. Proletariat has developed multiple independent games and launched its best-known game, Spellbreak in September 2020.

== History ==
After Zynga closed its Boston studio in October 2012, Seth Sivak and four other former developers at Boston Zynga formed a new independent studio, Proletariat Inc.

The company's first major release was World Zombination, a horde-based real-time strategy mobile game. The studio raised $6 million from venture investors to finish the game. Development of the game started in April 2013. The game was ultimately released in February 2015 for Android and iOS.

In 2019, Proletariat Inc. announced the completion of $20 million in Series C funding from investors including Spark Capital, FirstMark Capital and Take-Two Interactive to grow and expand its development team. Alongside funding, Take-Two Interactive's head of corporate development and independent publishing, Michael Worosz, joined Proletariat's board of directors in 2019.

Proletariat moved from mobile games to PC titles with the release of the fast-paced arena game Streamline in 2016, which featured full live streaming integration that allowed Viewers to interact with and control what is displayed on the screen on Twitch. The company then developed Spellbreak, a free-to-play multiplayer action spellcasting game released on Microsoft Windows, PlayStation 4, Xbox One and Nintendo Switch in 2020.

In June 2022, Proletariat announced that the company will end the development of Spellbreak and shut down the game servers in 2023. The next day, Blizzard Entertainment announced they had agreed to acquire Proletariat, Inc., and the studio will be assigned to work on World of Warcraft, beginning with the ninth expansion, Dragonflight.

== Games developed ==
Year	Title	Note
2015	World Zombination	
2016	Streamline	
2017	StreamLegends	
2020	Spellbreak	
2022	World of Warcraft: Dragonflight	Co-developed with Blizzard Team 2
2024	World of Warcraft: The War Within	Co-developed with Blizzard Team 2
2026	World of Warcraft: Midnight	Co-developed with Blizzard Team 2
TBA	World of Warcraft: The Last Titan	Co-developed with Blizzard Team 2
