= Dead Static Drive =

2025 video game

- Developer: Reuben Games
- Publisher: Reuben Games
- Engine: Unreal Engine 4
- Platforms: Windows; Xbox One
- Release: 5 November 2025
- Genres: Action-adventure, survival horror
- Mode: Single-player

Dead Static Drive is a top-down driving meets survival horror video game developed and published by Reuben Games. It was released on Windows and Xbox One on 5 November 2025. The game has a "retro Americana" graphical style, and involves a road trip that takes a turn into Lovecraftian horror.

== Plot ==
The main character of the game goes on a road trip to reconnect with their estranged family members, traveling between towns and doing quests in each town where they can freely walk around outside their car. The player realizes that the apocalypse is happening and must fight Lovecraftian monsters and potentially stop the end of the world.

== Development ==
The game's creator, Mike Blackney, started development in 2014, and 6 months later, in 2015, received a $15,000 Unreal Dev Grant for the game's development. Later, he also received funding from the Australian government that enabled him to quit his job as a teacher and continue developing the game, as well as hire an artist and musician. He noted inspiration for the game from the 1981 film The Evil Dead, and horror set in the suburbs and mundane settings, and has described the game as "Grand Theft Cthulhu". Leena van Deventer came onto the project in 2019, as Creative Producer and Writer.

On 27 October 2025, Reuben Games announced via a press release that the game would launch on 5 November 2025.

== Reception ==
Stephanie Chan of VentureBeat called the game "stylish but also evocative". Adam Smith of Rock Paper Shotgun called the graphics "lovely" and the monsters "refreshingly untentacled", commenting that the game could use some folklore that is not just Lovecraft.
