= Skater XL =

2020 video game

- Developer: Easy Day Studios
- Publisher: Easy Day Studios
- Platforms: Microsoft Windows; Nintendo Switch; PlayStation 4; Xbox One
- Release: Microsoft Windows, PlayStation 4, Xbox One: WW: 28 July 2020; Nintendo Switch: WW: 5 December 2023
- Genre: Sports
- Modes: Single-player, multiplayer

Skater XL is a 2020 sports video game developed and published by Easy Day Studios for Microsoft Windows, Nintendo Switch, PlayStation 4, and Xbox One.

== Development ==
Developer Easy Day Studios is based in Long Beach, California. Skater XL released in early access for PC on 19 December 2018.

In April 2020, it was announced that the finished game would be released in July of that year for Microsoft Windows, PlayStation 4, Xbox One and Nintendo Switch. Professional skateboarders Tom Asta, Tiago Lemos, Evan Smith, and Brandon Westgate were announced as playable characters. The release date was eventually revealed as 7 July.

On 6 June, the game was delayed to 28 July except for the Switch, which would have its release date announced in the "coming weeks".

On 16 July Easy Day Studios revealed that Modest Mouse, Band of Horses, Getter, Interpol, Future Islands, Animal Collective, Silversun Pickups, Starheadbody, Built to Spill, Cende, Kratos Himself, The Shivas, and Westkust would all be featured in the games soundtrack.

A free game update was released on 6 August 2021, adding online multiplayer to all platforms after being in an "open beta" stage.

On 7 November 2023, it was announced that the game will release for Nintendo Switch on 5 December of that year.

== Reception ==
Reception

Aggregate scores
Aggregator	Score
Metacritic	(PC) 56/100 (PS4) 57/100 (XONE) 59/100
OpenCritic	28% recommend

Review scores
Publication	Score
GameSpot	5/10
IGN	5/10
Jeuxvideo.com	11/20
Nintendo World Report	8/10
PC Games (DE)	7/10
Push Square	5/10 stars
Shacknews	5/10

Skater XL received "mixed or average" reviews, according to review aggregator website Metacritic. Fellow review aggregator OpenCritic assessed that the game received weak approval, being recommended by 28% of critics.

Critics generally praised the game for its trick system and replay editor but criticized it for its tutorials, and lack of content.
