= Spellbreak =

Free-to-play battle royale online video game

- Developer: Proletariat
- Publisher: Proletariat
- Engine: Unreal Engine 4
- Platforms: Microsoft Windows; PlayStation 4; Xbox One; Nintendo Switch
- Release: September 3, 2020
- Genre: Battle royale
- Mode: Multiplayer

Spellbreak was a free-to-play, class-based third-person shooter video game developed by Proletariat for Microsoft Windows, PlayStation 4, Xbox One and Nintendo Switch, released on September 3, 2020. The game's official servers were shut down on January 10, 2023, however community-run servers have continued to run the game.

== Gameplay ==
Spellbreak is a projectile-based PvP shooter, however, unlike other shooters, it used gauntlets that fired magical spells in place of guns. Additionally, players could levitate and carry one 'Rune', giving access to abilities like flight, teleportation or invisibility. Players could choose from one of six elemental classes: wind, fire, ice, lightning, stone and toxic, which granted in game benefits related to that element. Each player started with their class gauntlet permanently attached to them and could pick up one of the other five as a secondary. Gauntlets could deal a primary attack, called a spell, and a secondary attack, called a sorcery. Spells were limited by Mana which was an energy pool shared with levitation, while using a sorcery triggered a cooldown timer. Elements from different gauntlets could be combined to make spells more powerful, provide crowd control effects, or reduce others, depending on strategic desires. According to the developer the game also included role-playing and roguelike elements.

Game modes included battle royale and Clash, a team deathmatch. With the release of Chapter 2 on April 8, 2021, Dominion, a 5v5 mode featuring control points would replace Clash.

== Development and release ==
The core combat was inspired by old school shooters like Quake and Unreal Tournament. Proletariat CEO Seth Sivak aimed to develop a game similar to H1Z1 with fantasy and roguelike themes. The setting was decided on after the team realized that most Battle Royale games were gun based and felt that they could produce a fantasy themed version of the genre. According to executive producer Cardell Kerr the game was initially more "swords than sorcery" although the balance would eventually switch. The game's visual design was influenced by such anime films such as Akira and Princess Mononoke as well as the animated series Avatar: The Last Airbender. Further inspiration for the visuals came from games with "gorgeous visual effects like 2D Castlevanias, League of Legends, and The Legend of Zelda: Breath of the Wild."

The game was released on September 3, 2020, for Microsoft Windows, PlayStation 4, Xbox One and Nintendo Switch. Proletariat announced in late June 2022 that they would stop working on further updates for Spellbreak as they had been acquired by Activision Blizzard and were transitioning to incorporate into Blizzard Entertainment's team that is in charge of developing World of Warcraft. In December 2022, a community version of the game was released, allowing for players to host the game.

The game's official servers were shut down on January 10, 2023. As of September 2024, the game continues to have an active playerbase on community-run servers.

== Reception ==
Reception

Aggregate score
Aggregator	Score
Metacritic	PC: 79/100; PS4: 72/100; XONE: 78/100; NS: 71/100

Review scores
Publication	Score
Destructoid	6/10
IGN	8/10
Nintendo Life	7/10

Spellbreak received "generally positive" reviews for Microsoft Windows and Xbox One and "mixed or average" reviews for PlayStation 4 and Nintendo Switch, according to review aggregator Metacritic.
