= No Place for Bravery =

2022 video game

- Developer: Glitch Factory
- Publisher: Ysbryd Games
- Engine: Unity
- Platforms: Microsoft Windows; Nintendo Switch
- Release: September 22, 2022
- Genre: Action role-playing
- Mode: Single-player

No Place for Bravery is a 2D top-down action role-playing video game developed by the studio Glitch Factory and published by Ysbryd Games. The game was released for Microsoft Windows and Nintendo Switch on September 22, 2022.

== Gameplay ==
Its combat style is inspired by Sekiro. According to the game's developers, the game's plot is based on the developers' own experiences of the importance of father figures and the far-reaching implications of their decisions. The narrative is focused on Thron, a man tormented by nightmares from the past who risks going on a dangerous adventure to save his kidnapped daughter.

== Reception ==
On the review aggregator website Metacritic, the game received a score of 70 out of 100 based on 12 reviews for Switch version and 66 out of 100 based on 8 reviews for Windows version.

Khee Hoon wrote for Polygon that the game "revels in the violence and harshness of its battles". The editor criticized the game's excessive violence and also the difficulty of the battles: "It feels as if developer Glitch Factory drew the wrong lessons from the oeuvre of Dark Souls creator Hidetaka Miyazaki, an entire genre of games that thrive on challenging combat but still remain technically fair".
