= Le Donjon de Naheulbeuk =

French parodic audio series

Le Donjon de Naheulbeuk (English: The Dungeon of Naheulbeuk) is a French-language online audio series following a party of adventurers in a parody of heroic fantasy role-playing games. Created in 2001, the series was one of the first of its kind to be freely available online, prompting a wave of similar "MP3 sagas" to be published on the french-speaking web.

The series was created by John Lang, also known as Pen of Chaos, who, as well as having written and produced the series, also performed most of the character voices.

Following its success, the story was adapted into a comic series, a set of novels, and a video game.

== World ==
=== Land of Fangh ===
The Land of Fangh is the only known part of the world of Naheulbeuk. It contains various landmasses, such as the Schlipak Forest in the middle, high mountains in the north, or the plains known as the Wild Lands of Kwzprt, home of the Barbarians. Geography is pretty chaotic, as many things in Naheulbeuk are. There are two major cities and multiple villages in the Land of Fangh:

In the middle lies Glargh, the greatest city the world has ever seen. Its inhabitants are known for their hatred of magic and their ability to recover from the various disasters that may happen. The city is ruled by a brotherhood of Brewers-Monks, and was once the country's capital.

South-east is the current capital, Waldorg, the city of magic. It is ruled by a Council of Wizards who spend much of their time in endless meetings and plots to gain more power.

The west of Fangh has many villages such as Valtordu (which may translate intro "Bentvalley") or Mliuej, city of beer, where half of the houses are breweries and the other half are taverns.

==== Chronology ====
- Animal Era (Ère Animale)(several millions of years)
- Era of Chaos (Ère du Chaos)(more than 2000 years)
- Godless Era (Ère sans dieux)(~500 years)
- First Age (Premier Âge)(~1500 years)
- Second Age (Deuxième Âge)

=== Characters ===
==== Heroes ====
All the characters are stereotypical depictions of Dungeons & Dragons characters. In this story, not only are they rather inept and unskilled, they also swear profusely and are unable to cooperate. None of the characters have names; they are only referred to by their professions.

- the Ranger: a not-so-heroic adventurer who acts as the team leader, despite heavy resistance from the other team members. He tries to keep some cohesion amongst the group, but he finds it difficult, especially with the Elf and the Dwarf constantly nagging each other and the Barbarian always trying to run ahead. He mentions completing a quest entailing that he chase chickens for his grandfather. There is also an inane scene in which villagers mention "a boy who was incredibly skilled at making furniture" and that they "regret that he took it to his head to go adventuring," suggesting that his front of being a skilled ranger hides more humble beginnings.
- the Dwarf: grumpy and greedy, the dwarf enjoys annoying the other members of the group, especially the Elf. He is also proficient in drinking beer and fighting monsters. He constantly argues with the Elf. The two are always mocking each other, although the dwarf usually instigates the fights. He fights with an axe, and can speak the goblin language (despite his people's declared hatred of goblins). He is fond of "chiantos candies" and bear meat with an ale-flavored sauce.
- the Elf: an archer, though she is actually more likely to hurt her own allies rather than her enemies. Naive and comically girly, she likes nature, animals and she takes great care of her appearance (actually nearly everything the Dwarf dislikes). She constantly argues with the Dwarf. In addition to her bow, she can see in the dark and has some surgery skills.
- the Thief (season 1): a cowardly thief armed with a dagger, though he never uses it as he would rather hide behind his comrades than fight. He can deactivate traps and open doors but there are doubts about his abilities. He is eventually killed by a fire trap he was unable to see.
- the Ogre: a large glutenous ogre who enjoys music and poetry. Unlike the others, he speaks in his own language. The Enchantress is the only one to understands him, forcing her to act as a translator between him and the rest of the team.
- the Enchantress: a female wizard who serves as the translator between the Ogre and the rest of the team. A living library, she literally keeps shelves of books with her (that is, in the Ogre's backpack). She reads profusely, sometimes in the most inopportune of moments, such as when under attack. She is widely knowledgeable, but her knowledge is rarely useful. She is incredibly unskilled with magic (for instance, she once detected her own group with a spell to see enemies coming), but slowly starts getting better powers in season 2. In the second season she also meets her cousin, and they recollect their misadventures in magic school, including setting the dorms on fire and summoning a monster in the swimming pool.
- the Barbarian: a rude, rather stupid barbarian who is only interested in fighting, usually yelling "Baston" ("Battle" in French slang) each time an enemy appears. He also mentions what appears to be his deity, Crom, whenever he is awed. Though quite a good fighter, he usually attacks without thinking ahead, even against more powerful enemies than him. Comically, he seems to have a sixth sense for solving riddles.
- the Minstrel (seasons 1, 2): a minstrel met by the group in the Donjon, and taken hostage by the Ogre during a fight. After the Thief's death, he joins the group and stays with them until his death in season 2, killed by a giant Troll he was trying to calm down with his music. He often sings, but his music is appreciated only by the Elf and the Ogre.
- the Paladin of Dlul, Deity of Sleep and Drowsiness (season 2): a paladin apprentice who shortly joined the group during season 2, before leaving them to find the Elf queen, who he has fallen in love with. Lazy, he has a lot of powerful magic items, but never uses them. He also says that he prays to Dlul when he sleeps, but the other characters are less than charitable to his religious views, merely believing that he is lazy.

==== Enemies ====
- Reivax: Zangdar's adviser and favorite minion. He is a coward, stammering while speaking to "the Maaaster". He owns a huge collection of taps, and usually gets whipped by the Dungeon's torturer whenever he tells Zangdar that his plans to stop the adventurers have failed.
- Tarken: a bandit encountered by the adventurers during season 2. He is quite similar to Robin Hood: he has dozens of companions and "robs the travelers who are careless enough to go through the Shalwood Grove".
- the Lich: a living dead creature. This creature slays the dwarf when he gets separated from the group after the raid on the tavern in the dungeon. Attempting to steal away with the cash box from the dungeon shop, the dwarf meets the creature and shortly thereafter, finds himself in Dwarf heaven.
- Zangdar: he is the master of the titular dungeon. He is allergic to bad music, which helps the adventurers to defeat him at the end of season 1. After his store of statuettes is stolen by the adventurers, he attempts to pursue them, but his incapable subordinates ruin his plans.
- Gontrand Théogal, level-12 Wizard, Ordonator of Zwimmaf's Beatitude: he is the adventurers' employer. He hired them to bring a statuette to him. He does not show up for the first meeting and instead instructs the adventurers to meet him in another town, leading to the second season.
- The Leek-people: this strange tribe of vegetable-human hybrids attempts to sacrifice the company. The company is rescued by a level-8 Warrior who demands an exorbitant sum in payment for her services.

==== Others ====
- Aztoona: She is the cousin of the Enchantress. The adventurers meet her when they are lost in the Schlipak Forest in the second season, and buy the Crown of Pronfyo from her in exchange of some of the weird items given to them by the elf queen
- Archein Von Drekkenov, aka the Haemophiliac Vampire. He is a nice undead, only feeding on coyote blood. But the adventurers, not knowing his true identity, kill him violently and as cruelly as possible...
- Garry Topper: a character who is a poorly disguised jab at "Harry Potter" of the selfsame books by J.K. Rowling. This character is an apprentice wizard and runs afoul of the dwarf, who cruelly breaks his wand. Upon being sold a "rune staff of curse" by the Enchantress, Topper accidentally transforms himself into a goat.
- Gildas: an old hermit the adventurers meet in the second season. He is violently killed by the Barbarian, who thought he was a wizard
- the lizard man
- Norelenilia of Nilnerolinor: the queen of the Lunelbar elves the adventurers meet in the Schlipak Forest. She "traps" the characters into having to answer a riddle, which is solved by the Dwarf, but she mistakenly gives credit to the Elf, as "an elf is most likely better at solving riddles". As a reward, she gives a bunch of magical but useless items to the group, along with a beautiful bow which the Elf cannot use because her level is too low, and a purse containing 12 gemstones.
- Roger
- Song-fu: an old sage the characters meet on their way. He answers questions the adventurers ask him. Upon hearing about the prophecy the characters have set in motion from the Enchantress, he commits suicide without any explanation.
- The Golbarg, a demon of the old world, is a huge creature with a red and blue skin, four arms and a sharp tail, according to the Ranger's description. He was trapped in the Deserted Floor thirty years ago, when Zangdar cast a spell which forbids him to use staircases...
- Greenny Tommy, an orc playing banjo with his music group, in the Tavern of Naheulbeuk.

== Plot synopsis ==
In the first season, the characters find their way through the dungeon to steal the statuette. (The last of the 12 statuettes of the prophecy).

In the second season, they must cross the dangerous Earth of Fangh to meet with their employer, Gontran Teogal, in an inn of the lost city of Boulgourville.

In the third season, they must steal the statuette again to save the world of the eternal sleep due to the return of the last god of chaos: Dlul the god of sleep and bore who is being summoned by the former employer of the adventurers. (This season, and the next, are not available in details on the site, but two audio episodes sum up the story of the first and second books).

The fourth season begins shortly after the end of the third season, with the adventurers running into the hills to escape from a hill giant. After the death of the Elf, they travel to Waldorg to ask a wizard to resurrect her. Then they are hired by the Council of Waldorg to steal an object in the tower of the Mistress of the Slanoush Cult. But they don't know that they are being used in a vicious plot against the city of Glargh...

The fifth season begins right after the end of the fourth, when the Elf learns that she has been proclaimed queen of her people. The adventurers must then follow her and prevent a war between all races from happening.

The sixth and final season of this first cycle follow the group to the northern edge of the Land of Fangh. Allied against the oldest enemy of the Land of Fangh, the leaders of a newly-formed army have tasked them to retrieve a powerful artifact that could tip the scale of the war in their favor.

== Derivative works ==
=== Le Donjon de Naheulbeuk graphic novels ===
Graphic novels titled Le Donjon de Naheulbeuk have been published by Clair de Lune editions, written by John Lang and illustrated by Marion Poinsot. There are 25 volumes adapting season 1 to 6. Additionally, several spin-offs have been released, written and illustrated by various authors and artists.

=== Novels ===
All the seasons (from the last to the first) have adaptated into novels written by John Lang himself. It could have been just a mere transposition from the audio and comic seasons into text, but the author added a fair amount of "cut scenes", as well a "prequel" part in the ironically last written book that relates the first seasons. Ironically because according to John Lang "Naheulbeuk could not go translated and sold in foreign languages unless the (book) series was completed".

Main series

- À l'aventure, compagnons (June 2013) ISBN 978-2-080236-51-7, the novel adaptation of the first two seasons, originally created as an audio fiction.
- La Couette de l'Oubli (June 2008) ISBN 978-2-915621-22-8, an original novel, as well as the sequel to the audio series and its novel adaptation, making it the third season of first cycle.
- L'Orbe de Xaraz (November 2009) ISBN 978-2-915621-27-3, fourth season of the first cycle
- Le Conseil de Suak (June 2011) ISBN 978-2-915621-31-0, fifth season of the first cycle
- Chaos sous la montagne (November 2014) ISBN 978-1-4767-8182-2, sixth and final season of the first cycle

Spin-off

- Les Veilleurs de Glargh ISBN 978-2-915621-52-5, a one-shot novel focusing on a group of watchmen and women in the great city of Glargh, chronologically set during seasons 4 to 6.

=== Role-playing game ===
A role-playing game has been developed by the author John Lang, who is still adding new content. The game takes place on the Land of Fangh, the same one the main characters of the series evolve in. The rules are adapted from the German role-playing game The Dark Eye. The author publishes all the game rules and content, as well as updates on his personal blog. Two Choose Your Own Adventure books entitled La Geste de Gurdil Tome 1: Prospection and Tome 2: Rétribution have been written by John Lang, illustrated by Guillaume Albin and published by Le Grimoire editions. The rules are the same as the Naheulbeuk role-playing game, and the reader plays as Gurdil, a famous dwarf mentioned several times in the main series and hero of the song Mon ancêtre Gurdil by the Naheulband.

=== Video games ===
A video game adaptation called The Dungeon of Naheulbeuk: The Amulet of Chaos (French: Le Donjon de Naheulbeuk : L'Amulette du désordre) was released on September 17, 2020 for Microsoft Windows and macOS. It was developed by Artefacts Studio and published by Dear Villagers. A console port (subtitled Chicken Edition) was released for Playstation 4, Nintendo Switch and Xbox One (with physical copies available for the first two) on June 24th 2021. A DLC entitled The Ruins of Limis was released for PC and MacOS on May 25, 2021, and included in the Chicken Edition on June 24, 2021.

Another video game, titled Naheulbeuk's Dungeon Master, was released on November 15, 2023.
