= Morbid: The Seven Acolytes =

2020 video game

- Developer: Still Running
- Publisher: Merge Games
- Composer: Simo Talasranta
- Platforms: Windows, PlayStation 4, Xbox One, Nintendo Switch
- Release: WW: 3 December 2020
- Genre: Action role-playing
- Mode: Single-player

Morbid: The Seven Acolytes is a 2020 action role-playing game developed by the Finnish studio Still Running and published by Merge Games. Players control the last surviving member of a warrior order and travel through the kingdom of Mornia to kill seven possessed beings. The game combines isometric pixel art with combat and progression systems drawn from the soulslike genre. Its setting incorporates Lovecraftian horror and body horror imagery. It was revealed at the Future Games Show in June 2020 and released for Windows, PlayStation 4, Xbox One and Nintendo Switch on 3 December 2020.

Reviews were mixed. The pixel art, music and boss encounters received praise, but the combat, navigation and limited explanations of gameplay systems drew criticism. A sequel, Morbid: The Lords of Ire, was released in 2024.

== Gameplay ==
Morbid: The Seven Acolytes is an action role-playing game played from an isometric perspective. The player controls the Striver, a female warrior who crosses the regions of Mornia to confront the seven Acolytes, who are the game's bosses.

Dodging is the main defensive action during combat. The Striver can make light and heavy melee attacks, dodge-roll, parry and sneak. Attacking and dodging use stamina, which replenishes automatically. Pistols, shotguns and rifles provide ranged attacks but have limited ammunition.

More than 25 melee weapons are available, each with a different attack pattern. Each weapon has speed and power values and can be improved with runes collected during exploration. The game has no armour or accessories. An undetected approach allows the Striver to inflict a critical hit.

Weapons and consumables are stored in a grid-based inventory. Weapons occupy several spaces, and there are no shops or separate storage facilities. Combat and quests provide experience. Levelling up awards skill points that can be spent on equippable bonuses called "Blessings". The Stone of Dibrom restores health and is replenished at shrines. Resting at a shrine also revives defeated enemies. Death returns the player to the last checkpoint without removing equipment or experience.

The Striver has health, stamina and sanity meters. Damage and encounters with certain creatures reduce sanity, which can alter attack and defence values. Enemies defeated while the meter is low may return in weaker nightmare forms. The game has no map. Optional books and item descriptions provide information about Mornia and its inhabitants.

== Plot ==
Morbid: The Seven Acolytes takes place in Mornia, a kingdom invaded by malevolent deities called the Gahars. Each Gahar requires a living host and has bound itself to one of seven Acolytes. The Acolytes were inhabitants of Mornia who accepted the invaders after suffering personal tragedies.

The Striver is the final surviving member of the order of Dibrom. After arriving on the coast of Mornia, she sets out to kill the Acolytes and separate the Gahars from their hosts. If she fails, the Acolytes will rise again and the Gahars will retain control of the kingdom. Much of the history of Mornia and the Acolytes appears in codex entries instead of dialogue.

== Development and release ==
Still Running developed Morbid: The Seven Acolytes in Helsinki, Finland. It was the studio's first soulslike game. Still Running described it as a "horrorpunk" action role-playing game. H. P. Lovecraft and films by David Cronenberg influenced its setting and monster designs. PC Gamer and TechRaptor compared elements of the game with Bloodborne and Dark Souls.

Simo Talasranta composed the game's 18-track orchestral soundtrack.

Still Running and Merge Games announced the game at the Future Games Show on 13 June 2020. The presentation included a gameplay trailer. The companies announced the 3 December release date the following November. Physical editions for PlayStation 4 and Nintendo Switch shipped on 4 December. A separate Signature Edition contained the game, a soundtrack CD, two enamel pins and a concept-art card.

Still Running announced a sequel, Morbid: The Lords of Ire, in February 2023. The sequel replaced the isometric pixel art with a third-person 3D presentation and expanded the original game's sanity system. Merge Games released it on 17 May 2024 for Windows, PlayStation 5, Xbox Series X/S, Xbox One and Nintendo Switch.

== Reception ==
Reception

Aggregate scores
Aggregator	Score
Metacritic	PC: 71/100; PS4: 61/100; XONE: 81/100
OpenCritic	52% recommend

Review scores
Publication	Score
Eurogamer Italy	5/10
RPGamer	2.5/5
PC Games	7/10
TechRaptor	7/10

Metacritic classified reviews of the Windows and PlayStation 4 versions as "mixed or average". The Xbox One reviews were classified as "generally favorable". On OpenCritic, 52% of critics recommended the game.

Marcello Ruina of Eurogamer Italy described the art and audio as the best parts of the game. He praised the pixel art and the designs of the Acolytes, though he preferred some of the designs to others. Pascal Tekaia of RPGamer also praised the pixel art. He wrote that the damaged and deteriorating environments conveyed the decline of Mornia, and that the instrumental and choral music matched the gothic setting. PC Games reviewer Yannik Cunha praised the creature design and music. The grotesque appearance of the world added to its visual appeal, he wrote.

Cody Peterson of TechRaptor praised the controls, weapon attacks and focus on dodging. He considered the combat the strongest part of the game and compared it with Bloodborne. Tekaia criticised its slower pace. He said that many encounters followed a pattern of attacking once and rolling away, and that the absence of a penalty for dying removed much of the tension. Cunha described a similar pattern across ordinary enemies and bosses. Because the same tactic remained effective, he saw little reason to change weapons and believed that repeated playthroughs would offer limited variety.

Ruina described ordinary enemies as slow and predictable and said the combat lacked impact. He believed the sanity and stealth systems suited the horror setting, but restorative items reduced their effect on play. He also argued that the lack of a death penalty lowered the difficulty for players unfamiliar with soulslike games.

The boss encounters drew a more positive response. Peterson praised their difficulty and compared their designs with the creatures in Bloodborne. Ruina also considered bosses and mini-bosses more dangerous than ordinary enemies, pointing to their stronger attacks and aggressive behaviour.

Tekaia praised the bestiary and codex entries but criticised the limited amount of story outside them. Non-player characters had little dialogue, he wrote. Peterson approved of making the background material optional because players could ignore it without hindering their progress. Ruina considered the central story conventional and the silent protagonist uninteresting. The optional background material gave him more interest in the setting than the main plot did.

Navigation and unclear instructions accounted for much of the remaining criticism. Peterson spent more than an hour searching an area before learning that destructible barrels blocked the route. He had defeated several bosses before discovering how the levelling system worked. Cunha criticised the explanations of sanity, elemental runes and character statistics. Similar-looking environments and the absence of a map also made navigation difficult.

Ruina occasionally had difficulty distinguishing scenery from walkable routes. Tekaia criticised the Striver's movement speed and the limited inventory space. He also reached two points where the route forward was unclear. Ruina encountered several technical problems at launch. One caused the game to freeze after the final boss and prevented the ending cutscene from playing. Still Running said it planned to correct the reported problems in a patch.
