= Calico (video game) =

- Developer: Peachy Keen Games
- Publishers: Whitethorn Games; Maple Whispering
- Composer: Star Victoria Power (Slide20XX)
- Platforms: macOS; Nintendo Switch; Windows; Xbox One; PlayStation 4; PlayStation 5
- Release: macOS, Switch, Windows, Xbox One; December 15, 2020; PS4, PS5; November 28, 2023
- Genre: Life simulation
- Mode: Single-player

Calico is a life simulation game developed by Peachy Keen Games and published by Whitethorn Games and Maple Whispering. Players manage a cat café on a magical island. It is non-violent and features simple tasks. It was crowdfunded in 2019 and released for personal computers and various consoles in 2020. The game received mixed reviews, with much of the criticism being directed toward its bugs.

== Gameplay ==
Players control a character who has inherited a cat café in a magical land full of pastel colors and various animals, including cats. Players can explore the world, adopt animals, and expand their café. Calico includes magical girl elements, such as spells that can make animals smaller or larger. Small animals, such as cats, can be ridden like a horse if they are enlarged. Players earn money and other rewards by solving quests for non-player characters. The game is non-violent, and quests generally involve simple tasks, such as finding a lost animal. There are no failure conditions, and the game has been described as an "interactive dollhouse".

== Development ==
Calico was crowdfunded on Kickstarter in April 2019 and raised double its goal. Whitethorn Games and Maple Whispering released it for macOS, Windows, Nintendo Switch, and Xbox One on December 15, 2020, and is scheduled to release for PlayStation 4 and PlayStation 5 on November 28, 2023.

== Reception ==
Reception

Aggregate scores
| Aggregator | Score |
|---|---|
| Metacritic | (PC) 57/100 (NS) 57/100 |
| OpenCritic | 48% recommend |

Review scores
| Publication | Score |
|---|---|
| Destructoid | 5.5/10 |
| GameSpot | 5/10 |
| Nintendo Life | 4/10 |

The PC and Nintendo Switch versions of Calico both received "mixed or average" reviews from critics, according to the review aggregation website Metacritic. Fellow review aggregator OpenCritic assessed that the game received weak approval, being recommended by 48% of critics.

GameSpot's reviewer said the game would have thrilled her back when she was eight years old, but, as an adult, she found the simplistic gameplay and bugs to be too problematic to recommend it. Playing the game in January 2021 after two large updates to fix the errors, Nintendo Life said it is "still a little too buggy for us to recommend" but found the game to be adorable when it worked properly. Reviewing it around the same time, RPGFan called it "as comfortable as a purring cat" but said not all of the game's flaws could be fixed easily. Hardcore Gaming 101 reviewed the game in 2022 and wrote, "Despite the lack of polish and feeling unfinished even with the updates, the game just oozes a distinct charm."
