= Turmoil (2016 video game) =

- Developer: Gamious
- Publisher: Gamious
- Designers: Jos Bouman; Erik Leppen
- Programmers: Erik Leppen; Florian van Strien; Herman Groenenboom
- Artist: Jan-Maarten Nachtegeller
- Composers: Jan Jaap Doeven; Arjen Schut
- Engine: GameMaker
- Platforms: Windows; macOS; Linux; Android; Nintendo Switch
- Release: June 2, 2016
- Genre: Simulation
- Modes: Single-player; Multiplayer

Turmoil is a simulation video game by Gamious and based on the 19th century oil rush in North America. It was released through Steam Early Access in 2015, before being fully released the following year.

== Gameplay ==
In-game screenshot

Turmoil is inspired by the 19th century oil rush in North America. The player has to earn their way to become a successful oil entrepreneur. As the player makes money digging up and selling oil, the town will grow along with them, allowing the player to buy upgrades, such as more horses or bigger pipes. Campaign mode allows the player to buy land at an auction, and dig for oil using dowsers, moles, or scanners, earning as much as they can in one year. The player goes up against three rival AIs in each level.

== Development ==
Turmoil was in a prototype phase for a year before it entered Steam Early Access in June 2015. After spending another year in early access, Turmoil was released on Steam on June 6, 2016. In February 2017, Turmoil was also released on iOS for iPad.

== Reception ==
Reception

Aggregate score
Aggregator	Score
Metacritic	73/100

Review scores
Publication	Score
Hardcore Gamer	80/100
Everyeye.it	68/100
GameCrate	73/100
Games.cz	70/100

The game was received as being an extremely simple game, but had too much repetition. It was also cited as "the epitome of simplicity" and "an addictive and nostalgic management strategy".
