= Quantum Error =

2023 video game

- Developer: TeamKill Media
- Publisher: TeamKill Media
- Engine: Unreal Engine 5
- Platform: PlayStation 5
- Release: PlayStation 5; November 3, 2023; Windows, Xbox Series X/S; TBD
- Genre: Action horror
- Mode: Single-player

Quantum Error is a 2023 action horror video game developed and published by TeamKill Media. The game was released digitally for the PlayStation 5 on November 3, 2023. It was then released physically for the PS5 in the United States on November 17, and in Europe on December 8. It received negative reviews from critics. It is also planned for release on Windows and Xbox Series X/S.

== Gameplay ==
Quantum Error is a shooter game with cosmic horror themes that can be played in either first-person or third-person perspective. Players control Jacob Thomas, a firefighter, as he attempts to deal with various issues at research facilities in outer space. Players must contend with both terrorists and monsters while attempting to rescue survivors using firefighting equipment. DualSense controllers provide feedback when encountering hazards, such as vibrating to indicate doors that are dangerously hot. Players can use quintessence to improve Thomas' skills, but there are no skill trees. Players' progress is saved at checkpoints.

== Development and Release ==
Quantum Error was announced by American studio TeamKill Media on March 28, 2020 for PlayStation 4 and PlayStation 5. While the game was planned to release for the PS4, they could not get the game to perform adequately on the system and canceled support. It was released digitally for the PS5 on November 3, 2023. It was then released physically for the PS5 in the United States on November 17, and in Europe on December 8. They intend to port it to Windows and Xbox Series X/S in the future.

== Sequel ==
TeamKill Media confirmed that a sequel titled Quantum State is currently in development for the PlayStation 5.

== Reception ==
Quantum Error received "generally unfavorable" reviews from critics, according to review aggregator website Metacritic. Metacritic listed it the fourth worst game of 2023. GamesRadar and Gaming Bolt praised the premise but said the art direction tried too hard to be cinematic. Although IGN described it as stylish and creepy, they said it was ruined by its bugs, poor enemy AI, checkpoint system, and story. Bloody Disgusting called it one of the worst games of 2023 and said it is "a failure on nearly every level".
