= Scriptorium: Master of Manuscripts =

2026 simulation video game

- Developer: Yaza Games
- Publisher: Mythwright
- Platform: Windows
- Release: April 17, 2026
- Genre: Simulator
- Mode: Single-player

Scriptorium: Master of Manuscripts is a simulation 2D video game developed by Polish studio Yaza Games and published by Mythwright. In the game, the player controls a medieval scribe, taking commissions from prestigious patrons and making manuscripts for them. The game was announced on August 15, 2024 and released on Steam on April 17, 2026.

== Gameplay ==
Controlling a medieval artist, drawing illustrations and managing their own manuscript workshop, the player is offered a choice between two styles of game modes: the Story Mode, which requires building a career through taking certain commissions for illustrations, maps, letters and other art; and the Sandbox Mode, with unlimited abilities, without any clients nor exact tasks. By spending earnings from commissions, the player can decorate their workshop, as well as buy new pictures for their canvas.

The player draws by choosing one of thousands of available medieval-styled pictures from the library of the game, placing it anywhere on the canvas, made from one of the available types of vellum. Each picture is sorted into different sections, bound to a certain theme, like "nature", "Hell", "Heaven", "weapons", etc; illustrations made on canvas can be also accompanied by text in relevant fonts. Creations, made in the game, can be exported as PNG files.

== Development ==
Player creating art in the editor by placing and moving stylised illustrations.

After the release of their first game - a turn-based strategy in medieval setting called Inkulinati, Yaza Games received feedback from the players asking for creative freedom instead of strategical control, and the studio decided to shift into this direction. The studio later stated that Scriptorium was heavily influenced by Kingdom Come: Deliverance, and the style of gameplay was inspired by 'relaxing' games like Tiny Glade, Animal Crossing and others. The developer humorously described the game as "700 years in the making".

== Reception ==
The game was highlighted as unique compared to others in its genre, as a "breath of fresh air in the medieval space", with relaxing gameplay, which is not typical for games set in the Middle Ages. Reviewers widely described Scriptorium: Master of Manuscripts as "cosy" and "comfortable", and noted the absence of AI-generated content, with the library of in-game pictures being purely human-made. Ivy Santiago from Happy Gamer wrote: "You're not just making pretty pictures; you're continuing a tradition that stretches back over a thousand years."
