= E3 2021 =

26th annual Electronic Entertainment Expo

Electronic Entertainment Experience 2021
- Begins: June 12, 2021
- Ends: June 15, 2021
- Location: Online
- Country: United States
- Previous event: E3 2020 (cancelled); E3 2019
- Next event: E3 2022 (cancelled)
- Organizer: Entertainment Software Association
- Filing status: Non-profit

The Electronic Entertainment Experience 2021 (E3 2021) was the 26th and final E3, during which hardware manufacturers, software developers, and publishers from the video game industry presented new and upcoming products. The event, organized by the Entertainment Software Association (ESA), ran as a virtual, online-only event with free access to all, from June 12–15, 2021.

Virtual events included keynote sessions from major publishers broadcast from a live stage in Los Angeles, an awards show, and a preview night, as well as helping companies to hold online private meetings with media and businesses. Because of the online-only nature, the event had been rebranded for the year as the Electronic Entertainment Experience rather than the standard Electronic Entertainment Expo. Greg Miller, Jacki Jing, and Alex "Goldenboy" Mendez served as hosts of the virtual events.

E3 2021 followed the cancelled E3 2020 event due to the COVID-19 pandemic and after the ESA could not work out a replacement event in time. The ESA had intended to hold an in person event in 2021 during its normal June dates, as stated to partners in April 2020, but had to alter their plans due to COVID-19 concerns. E3 2021 was free for everyone to attend. While the 2021 event was entirely online, ESA planned to return to an in-person event by 2022, though these plans were scrapped and the in-person event was cancelled in January 2022, and E3 2022 was cancelled altogether on March 31, 2022, including the digital event. In July 2022, it was confirmed that E3 2023 would mark a return to the in-person event. However, the lack of interest and attendance of major publishers caused the event to be cancelled as well, leading to the announcement of the event's official discontinuation in December 2023.

Companies that participated at the event included Nintendo, Microsoft, Capcom, Ubisoft, Take-Two Interactive, Warner Bros. Interactive Entertainment, Koch Media, Square Enix, Sega, Gearbox Software, Bandai Namco Entertainment, Turtle Beach, Verizon, and Xseed Games. Konami had planned to participate but announced later they would not be ready to present at E3 as they were deep into development on several projects which they would reveal at a later time.

== Online events ==
To host the online event, the ESA offered a mobile app and online portal to the public. Members of the media and press had access to this app and portal on June 7, for a media access week prior to the event. The public obtained access on June 12. The app and portal were used for accessing game showcases, developer panels, and press conferences, with some of this content also mirrored onto streaming services. Members of the media were able to register for access starting on May 24, while industry professionals and creators and influencers were able to register on May 31. General members of the public were able to register on June 3.

== Press conferences ==
=== Ubisoft ===
Ubisoft livestreamed its Ubisoft Forward E3 video event on June 12, 2021, at 12 p.m. PDT. Games covered during the event included Tom Clancy's Rainbow Six Extraction, Rocksmith+, Riders Republic, Tom Clancy's Rainbow Six: Siege, Assassin's Creed: Valhalla, Just Dance 2022, Far Cry 6, Mario + Rabbids Sparks of Hope, and Avatar: Frontiers of Pandora.

=== Gearbox Software ===
Gearbox Software held its E3 spotlight on June 12, 2021, at 2 p.m. PDT., providing more info on Tiny Tina's Wonderlands, Godfall, Homeworld 3, Tribes of Midgard and a look at the Borderlands film.

=== Microsoft/Bethesda ===
Microsoft and Bethesda Softworks held a joint press conference on June 13, 2021, at 10 a.m. PDT. Games presented included Starfield, S.T.A.L.K.E.R. 2, Back 4 Blood, Contraband, Sea of Thieves, Battlefield 2042, 12 Minutes, Psychonauts 2, Fallout 76, The Elder Scrolls Online, Party Animals, Hades, Somerville, Halo Infinite, Diablo II Resurrected, A Plague's Tale: Requiem, Far Cry 6, Slime Rancher 2, Atomic Heart, Replaced, Grounded, Among Us, Eiyuden Chronicle: Hundred Heroes, The Ascent, The Outer Worlds 2, Microsoft Flight Simulator, Forza Horizon 5 and Redfall.

=== Square Enix ===
Square Enix held a press event on June 13, 2021, at 12:15 p.m. PDT. Games announced included Marvel's Guardians of the Galaxy, remasters of Final Fantasy I through Final Fantasy VI, Legend of Mana, Marvel's Avengers, Babylon's Fall, Life Is Strange Remastered Collection, Life Is Strange: True Colors, and Stranger of Paradise: Final Fantasy Origin.

=== PC Gaming Show ===
PC Gamer presented its PC Gaming Show event on June 13, 2021, at 2:30 p.m. PDT. Among games featured included:

- Arboria
- Chernobylite
- Citizen Sleeper
- Dodgeball Academia
- Dying Light 2: Stay Human
- Far: Changing Tides
- Gigabash
- Gloomwood
- Icarus
- Ixion
- Lakeburg Legacies
- Lemnis Gate
- Mechajammer
- Naraka: Bladepoint
- Next Space Rebels
- Orcs Must Die! 3
- Project Warlock 2
- Rawmen
- Sacrifire
- Silt
- Songs of Conquest
- Soulstice
- They Always Run
- Tinykin
- Vampire: The Masquerade - Swansong
- Wartales

=== Capcom ===
Capcom's E3 presentation was given on June 14, 2021, at 2:30 p.m. PDT. Games presented included Resident Evil Village, Resident Evil RE:Verse, Monster Hunter Stories 2: Wings of Ruin, Monster Hunter Rise, The Great Ace Attorney Chronicles, and Street Fighter V.

=== Nintendo ===
Nintendo held a Nintendo Direct for E3 on the final day of the convention, June 15, 2021, at 9 a.m. PDT, followed by a three-hour-long Nintendo Treehouse Live show about titles discussed in the Nintendo Direct. Games included Super Smash Bros. Ultimate, Life Is Strange, Life Is Strange: True Colors, Marvel's Guardians of the Galaxy, Worms Rumble, Astria Ascending, Two Point Campus, Super Monkey Ball: Banana Mania, Mario Party Superstars, Metroid Dread, Just Dance 2022, Cruis'n Blast, Dragon Ball Z: Kakarot, Mario Golf: Super Rush, Monster Hunter Stories 2: Wings of Ruin, WarioWare: Get It Together!, Shin Megami Tensei V, Danganronpa Decadance, Fatal Frame: Maiden of Black Water, Mario + Rabbids Sparks of Hope, Advance Wars 1+2: Re-Boot Camp, Hyrule Warriors: Age of Calamity, The Legend of Zelda: Skyward Sword HD, and the sequel to The Legend of Zelda: Breath of the Wild. Nintendo also announced a limited edition Game & Watch for the Zelda series for its 35th anniversary that included the original Zelda game, Zelda II: The Adventure of Link, and Link's Awakening.

=== Best of E3 Awards ===
Editors from IGN, GameSpot, PC Gamer, and GamesRadar+ collectively decided on the Best of E3 Awards on June 15, 2021. Among their picks, Forza Horizon 5 was named as the Most Anticipated Game overall, with the Microsoft and Bethesda event as the Best Presentation.

== Featured games ==
This is a list of notable titles that appeared by their developers or publishers at E3 2021.

Capcom: The Great Ace Attorney Chronicles; Monster Hunter Rise; Monster Hunter Stories 2: Wings of Ruin; Resident Evil Village; Gearbox Software: Godfall; Homeworld 3; Tiny Tina's Wonderlands; Tribes of Midgard; Xbox Game Studios/Bethesda Softworks: Forza Horizon 5; Halo Infinite; Microsoft Flight Simulator; Psychonauts 2; Sea of Thieves; The Outer Worlds 2; The Elder Scrolls Online; Fallout 76; Redfall; Starfield; Sega: Super Monkey Ball Banana Mania	Nintendo: Advance Wars 1+2: Re-Boot Camp; Hyrule Warriors: Age of Calamity; Untitled The Legend of Zelda: Breath of the Wild sequel; The Legend of Zelda: Skyward Sword HD; Mario Golf: Super Rush; Mario Party Superstars; Metroid Dread; Super Smash Bros. Ultimate; WarioWare: Get It Together!; Square Enix: Legend of Mana; Life Is Strange Remastered Collection; Life Is Strange: True Colors; Marvel's Avengers; Marvel's Guardians of the Galaxy; Stranger of Paradise: Final Fantasy Origin; Ubisoft: Assassin's Creed Valhalla; Avatar: Frontiers of Pandora; Far Cry 6; Just Dance 2022; Mario + Rabbids Sparks of Hope; Riders Republic; Rocksmith+; Tom Clancy's Rainbow Six Extraction; Tom Clancy's Rainbow Six Siege

== Other events ==
=== Guerrilla Collective ===
The Guerrilla Collective, a group of indie game developers and publishers, held a two-day showcase of new game announcements over June 5 and June 12, 2021.

Games announced during the two-day event included:

- Aeon Drive (PC)
- AK-xolotl (PC)
- Akatori (PC)
- Among Us (PC)
- ANNO: Mutationem (PC)
- Aragami 2 (PC)
- Arcade Paradise (PC)
- Archvale (PC)
- Arietta of Spirits (PC)
- Batora: Lost Haven (PC)
- Bats the Game (PC)
- Beasts of Maravilla Island (PC)
- Behind the Frame (PC)
- Black Book (PC)
- Bloodstained: Ritual of the Night (Stadia)
- Blooming Business: Casino (PC)
- BPM: Bullets Per Minute (PC)
- Chernobylite (PC)
- Death Trash (PC)
- Demon's Mirror (PC)
- Demon Turf (PC)
- Despot's Game (PC)
- El Paso, Elsewhere (PC)
- Elderand (PC)
- Endling (PC)
- The Eternal Cylinder (PC)
- Fire Tonight (PC)
- Firegirl: Hack 'n Splash Rescue (PC)
- Ghostrunner (PC)
- Grime (PC)
- Grow: Song of the Evertree (PC)
- Guild of Dungeoneering: Ultimate Edition (PC)
- Happy's Humble Burger Farm (PC)
- Hello Neighbor 2 (PC)
- Hunt the Night (PC)
- Industria (PC)
- King of the Hat (PC)
- Kitsune Tails (PC)
- Kraken Academy (PC)
- KungFu Kickball (PC)
- Lamentum (PC)
- Legend of Keepers: Return of the Goddess (PC)
- The Legend of Tianding (PC)
- The Light of The Darkness (PC)
- The Lightbringer (PC)
- Loot River
- Moroi (PC)
- My Lovely Wife (PC)
- Neverwinter (PC)
- No Longer Home (PC)
- Omno (PC)
- Onsen Master (PC)
- Potion Craft: Alchemist Simulator (PC)
- Raji: An Ancient Epic (PC)
- Rawmen: Food Fighter Arena (PC)
- Robodunk (PC)
- Rubi: The Wayward Mira (PC)
- Run Die Run Again (PC)
- Sable
- Serial Cleaners (PC)
- Severed Steel (PC)
- Slime Heroes (PC)
- Source of Madness (PC)
- Super Space Club (PC)
- Tamarindos Freaking Dinner (PC)
- Tinkertown (PC)
- Trash Sailors (PC)
- Trifox (PC)
- Ultra Age (PC)
- UnMetal (PC)
- Venice 2089 (PC)
- Vertigo (PC)
- White Shadows (PC)
- Wolfstride (PC)
- Ynglet (PC)
- Zodiac Legion (PC)

=== Summer Game Fest ===
Geoff Keighley's second Summer Game Fest kicked off around the same time as E3 2021 and will last two months, through Gamescom in August 2021, featuring a range of promotional events outside of E3. Though Keighley had already stepped away from participating in E3 2020 before its cancellation, he arranged the first Summer Game Fest as a replacement for the cancelled show. Sony and the PlayStation brand had announcements during this event, forgoing E3 as they have done so from previous years, instead opting to do a dedicated State of Play event for the summer on July 8, 2021. Announcements made during the event include:

- Arcadegeddon
- Deathloop
- Death Stranding: Director's Cut
- Demon Slayer: Kimetsu no Yaiba – The Hinokami Chronicles
- F.I.S.T.: Forged In Shadow Torch
- Hunter's Arena: Legends
- Jett: The Far Shore
- Lost Judgment
- Moss: Book II
- Sifu
- Tribes of Midgard

From June 15–21, 2021, ID@Xbox offered a number of demos of upcoming games on the Xbox platform as part of the Summer Game Fest.

The Summer Game Fest opened with an announcement stream of games hosted by Keighley on June 10, 2021. Among titles presented include:

- Among Us
- The Anacrusis
- Back 4 Blood
- Call of Duty: Warzone
- The Dark Pictures Anthology: House of Ashes
- Death Stranding Director's Cut (PS5)
- Elden Ring
- Escape from Tarkov
- Evil Dead: The Game
- Fall Guys
- Jurassic World Evolution 2
- Lost Ark
- Metal Slug Tactics
- Monster Hunter Stories 2: Wings of Ruin (NS)
- Overwatch 2
- Planet of Lana
- Salt and Sacrifice
- Solar Ash
- Tales of Arise
- Tiny Tina's Wonderlands (PC, PS4, PS5, XBO, XBXS)
- Two Point Campus
- Valorant
- Vampire: The Masquerade - Bloodhunt

The Summer Game Fest included the first Tribeca Games Spotlight on June 11, 2021, featuring games that had been nominated for the inaugural Tribeca Film Festival Video Game award. These games included:

- The Big Con
- Harold Halibut
- Kena: Bridge of Spirits
- Lost in Random
- NORCO
- Sable
- SIGNALIS
- 12 Minutes

Koch Media presented a showcase on June 11, 2021, at 12 p.m. PDT., as part of the Summer Game Fest. Alongside introducing their new publishing label, Prime Matter, Koch Media's presenting covered the following games:

- The Chant
- Codename Final Form
- Crossfire: Legion
- Dolman
- Echoes of the End
- Encased
- Gungrave G.O.R.E.
- King's Bounty 2
- The Last Oricru
- Painkiller 2
- Payday 3
- Scars Above

=== IGN Expo ===
IGN held its IGN Expo event on June 11, 2021, at 1 p.m. PDT. Among featured games included:

- Arboria
- AudioClash: Battle of the Bands
- Big Rumble Boxing: Creed Champions
- Black Skylands
- Bramble: The Mountain King
- Broken Pieces
- Blacktail
- Chernobylite
- Core Keeper
- Death's Gambit: Afterlife
- Disciples: Liberation
- Doki Doki Literature Club Plus!
- The Forgotten City
- Haunted Space
- Inkulinati
- Martha Is Dead
- Mortal Shell
- OlliOlli World
- Sherlock Holmes: Chapter One
- Sifu
- SkateBird
- Smite
- Splitgate
- Steelrising
- Streets of Rage 4
- Survival Machine
- Tiny Tina's Wonderlands
- Two Point Campus
- Unbound: Worlds Apart
- Unpacking
- Wild West Dynasty
- World War Z: Aftermath

=== Wholesome Games ===
Wholesome Games held its Wholesome Direct event on June 12, 2021, at 10 a.m. PDT. It featured over 75 indie titles from small developers around the world.

- Alekon
- Amber Isle
- APICO
- BattleCakes
- Bear and Breakfast
- Beasts of Maravilla Island
- Behind the Frame
- Bird Problems
- Book of Travels
- Button City
- Cat Cafe Manager
- Cat Designer Mocha
- Clawfish
- Cloud Jumper
- co-open
- Dordogne
- Dreamland Confectionery
- Fire Tonight
- Floppy Knights
- Fossil Corner
- Freshly Frosted
- Frogsong
- Game Director Story
- The Garden Path
- Garden Story
- The Gecko Gods
- Here Comes Niko
- Hoa
- Hot Pot for One
- KeyWe
- Kokopa's Atlas
- Kotodama Diary
- KreatureKind
- Lake
- Lego Builder's Journey
- Letters: A Written Adventure
- A Little to the Left
- Loddlenaut
- Lonefarm
- Luna's Fishing Garden
- The Magnificent Trufflepigs
- Moonglow Bay
- Moonshell Island
- Mythic Ocean
- Ooblets
- The Outbound Ghost
- Paralives
- Passpartout 2: The Lost Artist
- Pekoe
- PowerWash Simulator
- Princess Farmer
- Pupperazzi
- Rainbow Billy: The Curse of the Leviathan
- Recolit
- RoboCo
- Sally
- Seasonspree
- Shashingo
- SkateBIRD
- Snacko
- Soup Pot
- Spirit Swap: Lofi Beats to Match-3 To
- Tasomachi: Behind the Twilight
- Teacup
- Toodee and Topdee
- Tracks of Thought
- Unpacking
- Venba
- A Walk With Yiayia
- We Are OFK
- Witchery Academy
- Witchy Life Story
- Woodo
- Wytchwood
- Yokai Inn

=== Devolver Digital ===
Devolver Digital held its presentation on June 12, 2021, at 1:30 p.m. PT. Games presented included Shadow Warrior 3, Trek to Yomi, Phantom Abyss, Wizard with a Gun, Death's Door, Inscryption, Devolver Tumble Time, and Demon Throttle. As with its recent presentations, the Devolver Digital continued to use the humor based on the character of Nina Struthers, this time presenting their new games as part of a new monetization scheme, the "Devolver MaxPass+". As part of the actual presentation, Devolver sold a single "NFT" copy - a "non-fuckwithable tape" rather than a non-fungible token - of the presentation which sold for $1,000, the funds going to the Scratch Foundation charity.

=== UploadVR Showcase ===
UploadVR held a presentation focusing on virtual reality games on June 12, 2021. Among games featured in this presentation included:

- After the Fall
- Blaston
- Demeo
- Fracked
- Green Hell
- I Expect You to Die 2: The Spy and the Liar
- In Da Hoop
- Larcenauts
- Nerf Ultimate Championship
- Pistol Whip
- Rhythm of the Universe: Ionia
- Sam and Max: This Time it's Virtual
- Sniper Elite VR
- Song in the Smoke
- A Township Tale
- Traffic Jams
- Unplugged
- Waltz of the Wizard

=== Limited Run Games ===
Limited Run Games held its annual #LRG3 event on June 14, 2021, at 1 p.m. PDT. It featured over 25 new announcements for games being published physically, including the 3DO game Plumbers Don't Wear Ties.

=== Future Games Show ===
GamesRadar+ hosted its second Future Games Show on June 14, 2021, with hosts Troy Baker and Laura Bailey. Games featured during the presentation included:

- Batora Lost Haven
- Chernobylite
- Conway: Disappearance at Dahlia View
- DeathRun TV
- Dying Light 2: Stay Human
- Eldest Souls
- Enlisted
- Esports Boxing Club
- Grow: Song of the Evertree
- Get Packed: Fully Loaded
- Happy Game
- Harold Halibut
- Hell Let Loose
- Immortality
- Instinction
- Jurassic World Evolution 2
- KeyWe
- Lake
- Minute of Islands
- OlliOlli World
- Project Ferocious
- Red Solstice 2: Survivors
- Severed Steel
- Sonic Colors Ultimate
- Starmancer
- Tails of Iron
- Two Point Campus
- Warcry Challenges

=== Hooded Horse ===
Hooded Horse held its presentation on June 14, 2021. Games featured during the presentation included:

- Alliance of the Sacred Suns
- Falling Frontier
- Terra Invicta

=== Freedom Games Showcase ===
Freedom Games held its first event on June 15, 2021. Games featured during the presentation included:

- Airborne Kingdom
- Anuchard
- Cat Cafe Manager
- Coromon
- Dark Deity
- Dreamscaper
- Monster Outbreak
- One Lonely Outpost
- Sands of Aura
- Slaughter League
- To The Rescue!
- Tower Rush

=== Yooreka Studio ===
Yooreka Studio held its presentation on June 15, 2021. Games featured during the presentation included:

- Extremely Realistic Siege Warfare Simulator
- The Immortal Mayor
- Loopmancer
- Metal Mind
- Mohism
- Reshaping Mars
- The Swordsmen X: Survival
- Tales of Wild

=== New Blood Interactive ===
New Blood Interactive held its presentation on June 16, 2021. Games featured during the presentation included:

- Amid Evil
- Dusk '82
- Faith: The Unholy Trinity
- Fallen Aces
- Gloomwood
- Ultrakill
- Unfortunate Spacemen

=== Steam Next Fest ===
From June 16–22, 2021, Valve ran its Steam Next Fest, a rebranding of its prior Steam Game Festival which it first ran in 2019. During the event, Valve had hundreds of game demos available via the Steam platform along with livestreams with developers and selected game sales.

=== EA Play ===
Electronic Arts had its separate EA Play event on July 22, 2021. Games shown off in the event included:

- Apex Legends
- Battlefield 2042
- Dead Space (Remake)
- FIFA 22
- Grid Legends
- Knockout City
- Lost in Random
- Madden NFL 22
- The Sims 4

=== Annapurna Interactive Showcase ===
Annapurna Interactive held its first event on July 29, 2021. Games shown off in the event included:

- The Artful Escape
- Gorogoa
- I Am Dead
- A Memoir Blue
- Neon White
- Outer Wilds: Echoes of the Eye
- The Pathless
- Skin Deep
- Solar Ash
- Storyteller
- Stray
- Telling Lies
- What Remains of Edith Finch

=== Future of Play Direct ===
GLITCH debuted its Future of Play Direct showcase on June 12, 2021. It featured 22 titles from developers around the world. The games included were:

- Aerial_Knight's Never Yield
- Among Us
- Anodyne 2: Return to Dust
- Bomb Rush Cyberfunk
- Bravery Network Online
- Chinatown Detective Agency
- Dome-King Cabbage
- Hellbent
- HyperDot
- Killer Auto
- Love Shore
- Raddminton
- Sephonie
- She Dreams Elsewhere
- Skullgirls
- Soup Pot
- Spirit Swap: Lofi Beats to Match-3 To
- Umurangi Generation
- Unbeatable
- Way To The Woods
- The Wild at Heart
- Zodiac XX Leo Edition
