= Clickolding =

2024 video game

- Developer: Strange Scaffold
- Publisher: Strange Scaffold
- Director: Xalavier Nelson Jr.
- Programmer: Val Magri
- Composer: R.J. Lake
- Engine: Unreal Engine 5
- Platform: Microsoft Windows
- Release: July 16, 2024
- Genre: Adventure
- Mode: Single-player

Clickolding is a 2024 adventure video game developed and published by Strange Scaffold. It was released on July 16, 2024 for Windows systems.

== Gameplay ==
Gameplay screenshot.

The gameplay is built around clicking a four-digit tally counter up to its limit. The entirety of the game is confined to one motel room. The player can move around within it and interact with a handful of objects. At certain points, the Clickold gives orders such as requesting that the player stand in certain areas of the room. The player is unable to click the counter until they comply with the requests.

== Plot ==
The game begins with the protagonist alone in a motel room with a masked man (referred to as "the Clickold"), who presents them with a tally counter. The Clickold orders the protagonist to reset the counter by clicking it up to its limit of 9999, promising to afterwards pay them the $14,000 they need for a medical procedure. The player clicks, the Clickold stops them at odd intervals and gives them arbitrary orders, often using suggestive language. He explains that he has owned the counter for a long time, but recently has been unable to click it as he would like to. He also says that the money is hidden underneath the motel room's bed. As the counter nears its limit, the Clickold reveals that he has a wife and two small children, whom he has kept his fixation with counters a secret from. At 9700, the Clickold begins brandishing a gun and begs the protagonist to reset the counter. Upon resetting the counter past 9999, the Clickold thanks the protagonist and uses the gun to commit suicide in front of them. As the credits roll, a jazz band is heard performing a song about the apocalypse in a restaurant.

After the credits, the protagonist is left alone in the motel room with the Clickold's body. They hear the voice of the Clickold instructing them to continue clicking. As they do so, a painting of a blind man being healed begins spinning and glowing on the wall. Upon reaching 1000, the protagonist is transported to a white void the Clickold had described dreaming about. They meet a monochrome man with a tally over his head showing the total number of clicks since starting the game. He expresses disappointment with the Clickold's suicide and reveals that he has "captured the attention" of others before, who each forgot meeting him. Unlike others, the Clickold remembered the dream and became obsessed with it, ruining his life. The man acknowledges that while the protagonist will leave the room and forget meeting him, "the one who clicks" (the player) will not. The player can continue clicking indefinitely in either the void or the motel room.

== Development ==
Clickolding was developed by Strange Scaffold, the creators of El Paso, Elsewhere. It is among the first video games to be funded by Outersloth, a new indie label created by Innersloth. Game director Xalavier Nelson Jr. described Clickolding as "a dark incremental narrative game about tally counters, motels, and uncomfortable vulnerability with people you don't wish to fully know." Outersloth's official website would state, "They pitched such an unhinged and unsettling story it made an entire room erupt and somehow that ended up with them getting funding." The game spent only two months in development.

The game is composed by R.J. Lake.

== Reception ==
Reception

Aggregate score
Aggregator	Score
Metacritic	70/100

Review score
Publication	Score
Destructoid	6/10

On the review aggregator Metacritic, Clickolding holds a score of 70/100, indicating "mixed or average" reviews.

Writing for Polygon, Cass Marshall compared Clickolding's tone and atmosphere to that of Inscryption. She wrote, "This isn't a full-course meal, but more of a cake pop — short-lived, sweet, and a little heavy." Zoey Hadley of Destructoid scored the game a 6/10, taking issue with the short runtime and lack of a more complex narrative. Digital Trends was more positive, writing that the game succeeded in making the player feel the discomfort and exploitation of the premise. Nic Reuben of Rock Paper Shotgun also praised the game's inventiveness.
