= Foundation for the Conservation of the Maltese Honey Bee =

Effort to conserve Maltese honey bees

The Foundation for the Conservation of the Maltese honey bee (Maltese: Fondazzjoni għall-Konservazzjoni tan-Naħla Maltija) is a Maltese non-governmental organisation aimed at the protection and conservation of the Maltese honey bee (Apis mellifera ruttneri), a subspecies of the western honey bee.

It was established in July 2022 and officially recognised in May 2023. This organisation campaigns across Maltese society in accordance with its mission. It has raised concerns relating to the oriental hornet.

== Maltese honey bee and the hybridisation issue ==
The species of honey bee (Apis mellifera) is indigenous to Malta as it is not found only in Malta, while the subspecies (race) of the Maltese honey bee (Apis mellifera ruttneri) is found in Malta only so it is endemic to the Maltese archipelago. It is clear that the characteristics of the Maltese Bee are being polluted by honey bees of foreign breeds imported into our country. Since the bees are housed outside with minimal distinction between different subspecies, this is leading to the genetics of the Maltese Bee that was isolated for decades being mixed (hybridisation). Consequently, in an indirect way the Maltese bee is being destroyed because little by little it is losing its 'Maltese' characteristics due to this mixing and therefore the adaptation it had to live in local habitats and climate. The evolutionary concept of the survival of the fittest (survival of the fittest) is being greatly disrupted to the detriment of the subspecies that forms part of the Maltese natural heritage, as well as to the local apicultural sector. Apart from that when a species forms a subspecies the biodiversity is increasing and this is potentially the first step in the creation of a new species. Key to this mixing process is the importation of foreign bees, which has put this subspecies endemic to Malta at serious risk of extinction. Also in the context of climate change, the protection of local subspecies is also very important. The potential for adaptation to a harsher climate in the near future is only in the conservation of the endemic subspecies. The importance of the conservation of the local bee and its breeding is advantageous and important. In itself, the Maltese subspecies has an intrinsic value due to its endemicity. For sustainable beekeeping in the future, this subspecies needs to be conserved.

== About the foundation ==
The main purpose of the foundation is to draw up and work on an action plan on the conservation of the Maltese bee and take care of its coordination and execution. This coalition will only be working on issues that have to do with the Maltese bee and will not serve as a substitute for any other association. The coalition will be working on these objectives which are based on the main objective:

(a) They recognize the importance of the Maltese Bee for the natural environment of our country (ecology) and for the apiculture sector and in a wider sense the agricultural sector.

(b) They recognize that the Maltese bee is part of the Maltese natural heritage and therefore deserves to be conserved in a holistic way.

(c) To encourage knowledge, breeding and research on the Maltese endemic bee.

(d) Gathering under one umbrella and coordinating various entities, individuals and non-governmental organizations that have an interest in the conservation of the Maltese bee.

(e) Pressure is exerted to draw up a plan so that the Maltese Bee is protected in a holistic way.

== Publications ==
This organisation published a document detailing specific benefits unique to rearing of the Maltese Bee and explaining the benefits of protecting Maltese bees for the Maltese beekeeping sector and its sustainability. Some of the benefits discussed include resilience to the local climatic conditions and resistance to certain pests and diseases.

== Initiatives ==
It had also started an initiative to put pressure on the government to control the population of the Oriental Hornet (Vespa orientalis) which has become a pest of the honey bee. It has been reported that this hornet, in summer 2022, killed 70% of the bee colonies in Malta, and it has also become a nuisance to the people. This initiative has been a hit and has been widely reported in the local media. The Foundation for the Conservation of the Maltese Bee formally requests the Environment and Resources Authority to officially designate the Maltese honey bee (Apis mellifera ruttneri) as the national insect of Malta. On the occasion of World Bee Day, the Foundation issued a statement emphasizing that this recognition would represent an exceptional contribution to our natural environment. Additionally, the Foundation earnestly appeals for concrete and enduring measures to be implemented, aimed at safeguarding our precious natural heritage for future generations.
