= Caterwaul =

Caterwaul may refer to:

- the cry of a cat in heat
- Caterwaul (band), American rock band
- Caterwaul, a fictional town which is the main setting of the 2022 video game Cat Cafe Manager
