= Instinction =

Instinction may refer to:

- Instinction (song), a 1982 single by Spandau Ballet
- Instinction (video game), an upcoming video game
