= KeyWe =

2021 video game

- Developers: Stonewheat & Sons
- Publisher: Sold Out
- Artist: Grant Gessel
- Platforms: Windows; Nintendo Switch; PlayStation 4; PlayStation 5; Xbox One; Xbox Series X/S
- Release: Windows, Switch; August 31, 2021; PS4, PS5; September 28, 2021; Xbox One & Series X/S; December 16, 2021
- Genre: Puzzle
- Modes: Single-player, multiplayer

KeyWe is a 2021 puzzle video game developed by Stonewheat & Sons and published by Sold Out. The game was released for Windows and Nintendo Switch on August 31, later releasing on September 28 for PlayStation 4 and PlayStation 5. Xbox One and Xbox Series X/S ports were released on December 16. KeyWe follows Jeff and Debra, two kiwis working at the Bungalow Basin Telepost Office. KeyWe was prototyped during the 2018 Global Game Jam. Grant Gessel, the technical artist, took inspiration from Going Postal, a story by Terry Pratchett. Rare games such as Banjo-Kazooie and Conker's Bad Fur Day inspired KeyWe's art style. KeyWe received mixed reviews from critics.

== Gameplay ==
Jeff and Debra have to type the word "pants" by using the keys in the level.

KeyWe's story takes place over three seasons: Summer, Wickertide, and Winter. Players control Jeff and Debra, two flightless birds. The kiwis can push and pull objects, or grab letters with their beaks. The kiwis can also use their butts to collect labels and press buttons. Each mission has a main objective that has to be completed. The puzzles receive modifiers as the player progresses. In one level, Kudzu vines have to be removed to move boxes around the office. Some buttons may change places, and messages may be written in code. The main stages task the players with typing messages, placing the correct postcodes and labels on packages, and sorting incoming and outgoing mail. Beating target times rewards the player with stamps, which can be used to purchase cosmetic items for the kiwis. Players can replay levels to earn more stamps. More stamps can be received from playing minigames such as playing instruments and riding cassowaries.

== Development and release ==
KeyWe is the first game by US developer Stonewheat & Sons. The game was prototyped during the 2018 Global Game Jam. During the event, the developers picked a modifier, and was given "Your game must contain a bird protagonist". The developers liked the idea of postal birds that couldn't fly, and had to work at desk job instead. One of the developers drew a picture of a bird wearing a headset, and the team later decided on a game with two birds sending telegrams by typing with their butts. Grant Gessel is Stonewheat's technical artist, and Joel Davis is the animator. Stonewheat wanted the game to be accessible to families. Gessel took inspiration from Terry Pratchett's Going Postal, a story about a conman who is given an opportunity to work as a postmaster. Rare games such as Banjo-Kazooie and Conker's Bad Fur Day were inspirations for KeyWe's art style.

In February, Sold Out announced KeyWe for PC, with a planned release date of 2021. Sold Out showcased the game at their booth at Pax East 2020, along with Disjunction, No Straight Roads, Gestalt: Steam & Cinder, and Radical Rabbit Stew. In May, KeyWe was one of 55 games featured at the Wholesome Direct. KeyWe made an appearance at The Escapist's Indie Showcase. A trailer was featured at Gamescom 2020. Nintendo Switch, PlayStation 4, PlayStation 5, Xbox One, and Xbox Series X/S versions were announced in February 2021. The game was set to release in the summer. On April 14, the game was shown at the Nintendo Indie World showcase. The game was given a release date of August. Owners of the Switch version would receive an exclusive outfit. On May 27, 2021, KeyWe's release date of August 31 was announced. Those who pre-ordered the game would receive the Early Bird Pack. KeyWe was featured at the Wholesome Direct of E3 2021. It was also one of over 45 games featured during the Future Games Show. KeyWe's demo was available during the Steam Next Fest. KeyWe was released for PC and Nintendo Switch on August 31, 2021. On September 28, the game was released on PlayStation 4 and PlayStation 5. Xbox One and Xbox Series X/S versions were released on December 16.

DLC for PC called "The 100th Annual Grand Ol' Telepost Tournament" was released in February 2022. At W.A.S.D 2022, KeyWe made an appearance at Fireshine's (Note: Sold Out rebranded to Fireshine Games in March 2022.) stand, along with games such as Silt. KeyWe was added to GeForce Now in June.

== Reception ==
Reception

Aggregate score
Aggregator	Score
Metacritic	PC: 73/100 (Note: Score based on 6 reviews.); PS5: 74/100 (Note: Score based on 5 reviews.)

Review scores
Publication	Score
Famitsu	6/10, 7/10, 8/10, 8/10
Push Square	7/10
Shacknews	8/10
Slant Magazine	4/5

KeyWe received "mixed or average" reviews, according to review aggregator Metacritic. The game received a score of 29/40 from Famitsu, based on individual reviews of 6, 7, 8, and 8.

Writing for Shacknews, Sam Chandler wrote that KeyWe "something special" and a "charming, yet challenging experience". He praised the puzzles, mini-games, and "charming" visuals. Chandler criticized the controls, calling them "finicky". Slant Magazine's Aaron Riccio wrote that KeyWe "turns a game about operating a telepost into a noble calling". Stephen Tailby from Push Square rated KeyWe 7/10 stars, praising the cooperative challenges and the "cute" presentation. However, Tailby criticized the controls, calling them "occasionally iffy".

Shacknews gave the game an honorable mention in their "Top 10 Indie Games of the Year 2021". Rock Paper Shotgun included the game in its "25 best non-violent games on PC" list. PCMag listed the game as number eight in their "10 Terrific Indie Games You Might Have Missed In 2021" list. Android Central included the game in their "Best social and co-op games for PS4 and PS5 in 2022" list.

=== Awards and nominations ===
KeyWe won the award for Best Family Game at the 2020 Gamescom Awards. In 2021, KeyWe was a finalist for Best Social Game at TIGA's UK Games Industry Awards. At the 2022 Independent Games Festival, the game received an honorable mention for Excellence in Design.

Year	Association	Category	Result	Ref
2020	Gamescom Awards	Best Family Game	Won	
2021	UK Games Industry Awards	Best Social Game	Finalist	
2022	Independent Games Festival	Excellence in Design	Honorable Mention	
