= Minimax (disambiguation) =

Minimax is a strategy in decision theory and related disciplines.

Minimax, minmax, or min-max can also refer to:

== Mathematics ==
- Minimax estimator, an estimator whose maximal risk is minimal between all possible estimators
- Minimax approximation algorithm, algorithms to approximate a function
- The Courant minimax principle, a characterization of the eigenvalues of a real symmetric matrix
- Minimax theorem, one of a number of theorems relating to the max-min inequality
- The Min-max theorem, a characterization of eigenvalues of compact Hermitian operators on Hilbert spaces
- Minimax Condorcet method, one of the Condorcet compliant electoral systems.
- God's number, the minimum number of moves required to solve a puzzle at its maximum complexity
- Yao's principle, regarding the expected cost of algorithms
- The fundamental max–min inequality of real analysis
- Saddle point, also known as the minimax point
- The Minimax facility location problem, a facility location problem with only one facility to place

== Other ==
- MiniMax (company), a Chinese Artificial intelligence company
- Minimax (TV channel), a television channel available in Central and Eastern Europe (not to be confused with the Pakistani television channel)
- Disney XD (Spanish TV channel), formerly known as Minimax
- Teletoon+, a Polish television channel formerly known as Minimax
- Min-maxing, a role-playing or wargame strategy
- 'mini-maxing', a strategy in the board game Hex
- Mini-MAX, a family of ultralight aircraft
- Minimax Limited, a manufacturer of fire extinguishers
- miniMAX Discount, defunct Romanian supermarket chain
- Minimax, a cooking approach promoted by celebrity chef Graham Kerr in the 1980s and 1990s
- Frosted Mini-Wheats, a cereal made by Kellogg's known as Mini Max in the UK
- Mini-Max, a character in Disney's Big Hero 6: The Series
- MinnMax, a Minnesota-based video game podcast
