= Maltese honey bee =

Scientific classification
- Kingdom: Animalia
- Phylum: Arthropoda
- Clade: Pancrustacea
- Class: Insecta
- Order: Hymenoptera
- Family: Apidae
- Genus: Apis
- Species: A. mellifera
- Subspecies: A. m. ruttneri

Trinomial name
- Apis mellifera ruttneri Sheppard, Arias, Grech & Meixner, 1997

Subspecies of honey bee

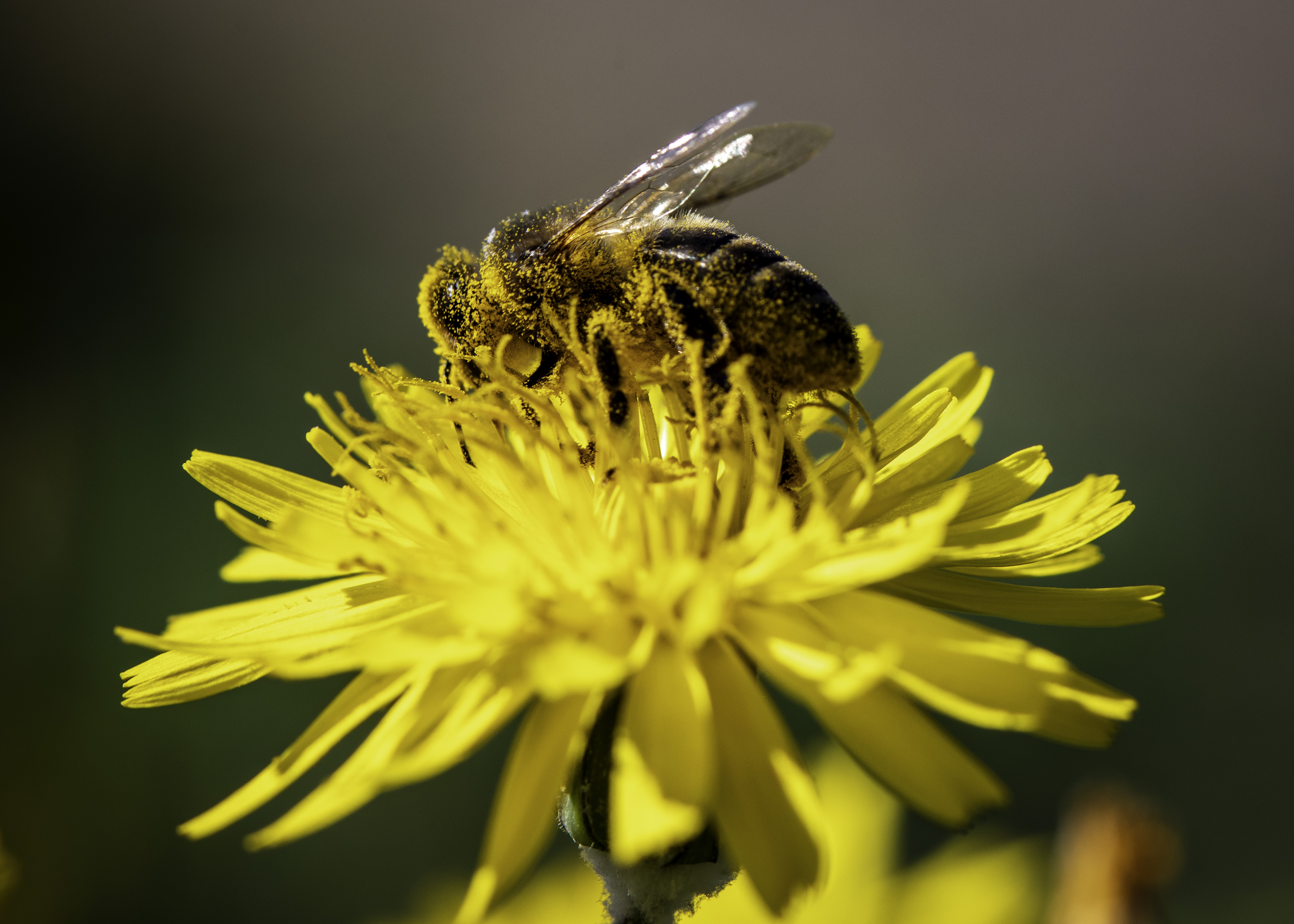
Maltese Honey Bee on a Hyoseris flower

The Maltese honey bee, Apis mellifera ruttneri, is a subspecies of the western honey bee, endemic to the Maltese islands which are situated in the Mediterranean Sea. On the initiative of the Foundation for the Conservation of the Maltese Honey Bee, the Government of Malta, on 24th September 2024, declared this subspecies the national insect of Malta. A €2 commemorative coin was also issued to mark the occasion, further strengthening the legal protection of this insect.

== Origin ==
The A. m. ruttneri evolved into a distinct subspecies when the Maltese islands were cut off from Sicily at the end of the last ice age, belonging to the A Lineage of Apis mellifera and therefore being more closely related to African lineage rather than to the European C Lineage. The production of honey by the Maltese bee has likely contributed to the islands name as the ancient Greeks called the island Μελίτη (Melitē) meaning "honey-sweet".

== Character and behaviour ==
The bee is of relatively dark colour and has shown an ability to defend itself against local predacious wasps, a behavior also reported in the related A. m. sicula, but not observed in imported A. m. ligustica bees. It was also observed to abscond during times of dearth and produce large numbers of queen cells prior to swarming (up to 80).

In a comparison study on the island of Malta against the A. m. ligustica, the A. m. ruttneri showed significantly greater tolerance (all the A. m. ruttneri hives were still alive after 23 months, while all the A. m. ligustica hives died within a year) and resistance (by measuring the Hygienic trait with a Pin Test, the A. m. ruttneri had 50% higher results) towards the Varroa destructor mite. Also the A. m. ruttneri produced over three times the yield of honey when compared to the A. m. ligustica bees during the late season. However the A. m. ruttneri was observed to be more aggressive and less calm on the comb during inspections, and they appeared to continue to rear brood and maintain a higher population during the winters months on Malta.

== History of A. m. ruttneri ==
The subspecies is named after Professor Friedrich Ruttner, an expert in honey bee queen breeding and also in the intra-specific taxonomy of the Apis mellifera. It is considered as making a comeback after Varroa was introduced to Malta in the early 1990s. At that time colonies of bees from abroad were imported to compensate for the loss of colonies. In 1997 it was confirmed as a distinct subspecies through DNA analysis, previously morphometric wing analysis had been used. In 2022, it was reported that 70% of the Maltese colonies were destroyed by the Oriental hornet. In February 2024, a public consultation was opened to declare the Maltese honey bee as the national insect of Malta, an initiative that was proposed by the Foundation for the Conservation of the Maltese Honey Bee. In June 2024 Malta issued a €2 commemorative coin showing a rendition of the Maltese honey bee. Malta has declared the Maltese Honey Bee as its National Insect on 24th September 2024.

== Foundation for the Conservation of the Maltese Honey Bee ==
The Foundation for the Conservation of the Maltese Honey Bee began as an interim initiative in 2022 and was officially established in 2023 to support the conservation and promotion of Malta’s endemic honey bee. The organisation seeks to ensure that the Maltese honey bee is recognised as an integral part of the country’s sustainable apiculture, ecological balance, and natural heritage.

Its objectives include promoting research and selective breeding, coordinating with various entities committed to the bee’s preservation, and advocating for comprehensive legislation to protect Apis mellifera ruttneri in a holistic manner. The Foundation has strongly opposed the importation of foreign honey bee breeds into Malta, warning that “the Maltese honey bee (A. m. ruttneri) is being polluted by honey bees of foreign breeds being imported into our country.”

In the summer of 2023, the Foundation published a legal paper examining Maltese and European laws relevant to the genetic protection of the endemic Maltese honey bee. On World Bee Day (20th May 2023), it formally requested the Environment and Resources Authority (ERA) to declare the Maltese honey bee as Malta’s national insect.

This milestone was achieved on 24th September 2024, when a legal notice was published officially granting the species national status. To commemorate this achievement, the Foundation collaborated with the Central Bank of Malta to issue a €2 commemorative coin.

In 2025, the Foundation also introduced the mascot Katerina, created to represent Malta’s National Insect. The character featured in three educational music videos aimed at raising awareness among children and the wider public about the importance of conserving Malta’s unique honey bee. In 2026, the Foundation began releasing a series of eight children’s storybooks featuring Katerina, exploring Malta’s natural habitats and promoting biodiversity conservation.
