= An Airport for Aliens Currently Run by Dogs =

2021 video game

- Developer: Strange Scaffold
- Publisher: Strange Scaffold
- Designer: Xalavier Nelson Jr.
- Engine: Unity
- Platforms: Windows; Xbox Series X/S; Nintendo Switch
- Release: WW: May 25, 2021
- Genre: Adventure
- Mode: Single-player

An Airport for Aliens Currently Run by Dogs is an adventure video game developed and published by Strange Scaffold. Players explore airports and interact with intelligent, talking dogs. It was released for Windows, Xbox Series X/S, and Nintendo Switch.

== Gameplay ==
The protagonist and his fiancée, the last two humans, travel separately to various locations through airports run by dogs. The dogs are represented using stock photography and have descriptive names, such as "Bribe Dog", who accepts bribes. The dogs often require players to perform fetch quests to progress to their destination, but there is no money involved. Once players acquire the proper items, they can board their flight to meet their fiancée. Locations can include other planets. Time proceeds in real-time, and, if they miss their flight, players must determine an alternate route. All the signs are written in an alien language, which can be deciphered. The airports are open world, and players can complete optional side quests while they explore.

== Development ==
Strange Scaffold was founded by El Paso, Texas-based developer Xalavier Nelson Jr. for his personal projects. Nelson began as a video game reviewer and wrote articles for PC Gamer. Eventually, he realized that he wanted to tell stories using video games. An Airport for Aliens Currently Run by Dogs was developed in collaboration with No Quarter, an event run by the NYU Game Center. The story was initially serious, but Nelson liked the effect of the placeholder stock photo of a dog that he used for one of the characters. Nelson said his amusement over the change turned the development into "a healthy and joyful process". Strange Scaffold released it for Windows and Xbox Series X/S on May 25, 2021. They ported it to the Switch on August 25, 2022.

== Reception ==
Reception

Aggregate score
| Aggregator | Score |
|---|---|
| Metacritic | (PC) 64/100 |

Review score
| Publication | Score |
|---|---|
| The Guardian | 3/5 |

An Airport for Aliens Currently Run by Dogs received mixed reviews on Metacritic. GamesRadar, which praised the love story, called it "equal parts disarmingly funny and surprisingly touching". Adventure Gamers said it is "a highly unique and surreal" and praised the dialogue, but they felt the gameplay becomes repetitive. The Guardian said that it struggles to overcome its nature as a novelty game, but they enjoyed the love story and postmodern elements. PC Gamer said it is funny despite the repetition.
