= Min-max =

Min-max may refer to:

- Min-max optimization
- Min-max theorem
- Min-maxing, a strategy in video games

== See also ==
- Minimax (disambiguation)
- Min-max heap
