= Apico =

2022 video game

APICO
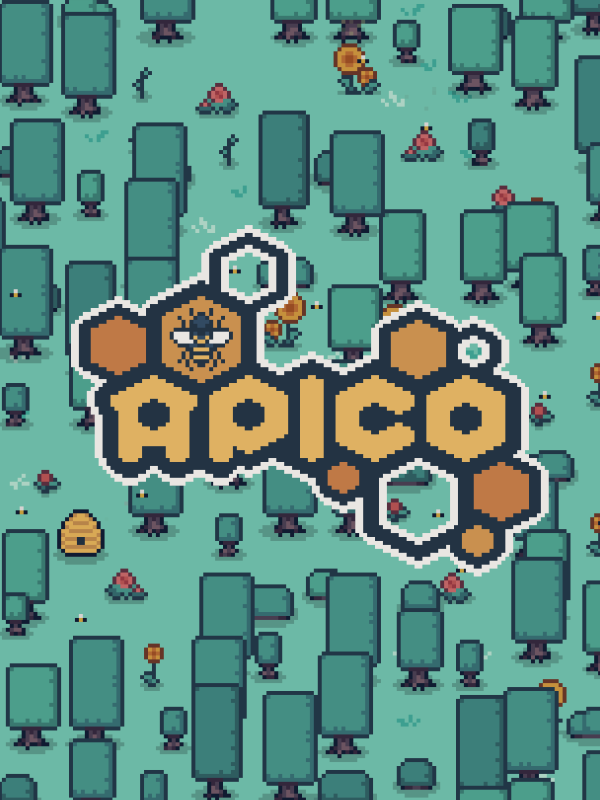
- APICO Cover Art
- Developer: TNgineers
- Publisher: Whitethorn Games
- Designers: ellraiser; metakitkat
- Programmer: ellraiser
- Composer: Mothense
- Engine: GameMaker
- Platforms: Linux; macOS; Windows; Nintendo Switch; PlayStation 4; PlayStation 5; Xbox One; Xbox Series X/S
- Release: Linux, macOS, Windows; 20 May 2022; Switch; 7 July 2022; PS4, PS5; 29 September 2022; XONE, XSXS; 22 June 2023
- Genres: Beekeeping, simulation
- Modes: Single-player, multiplayer

APICO is a 2022 beekeeping simulation video game developed by TNgineers and published by Whitethorn Games. It was released on 20 May 2022 to coincide with World Bee Day.

== Gameplay ==
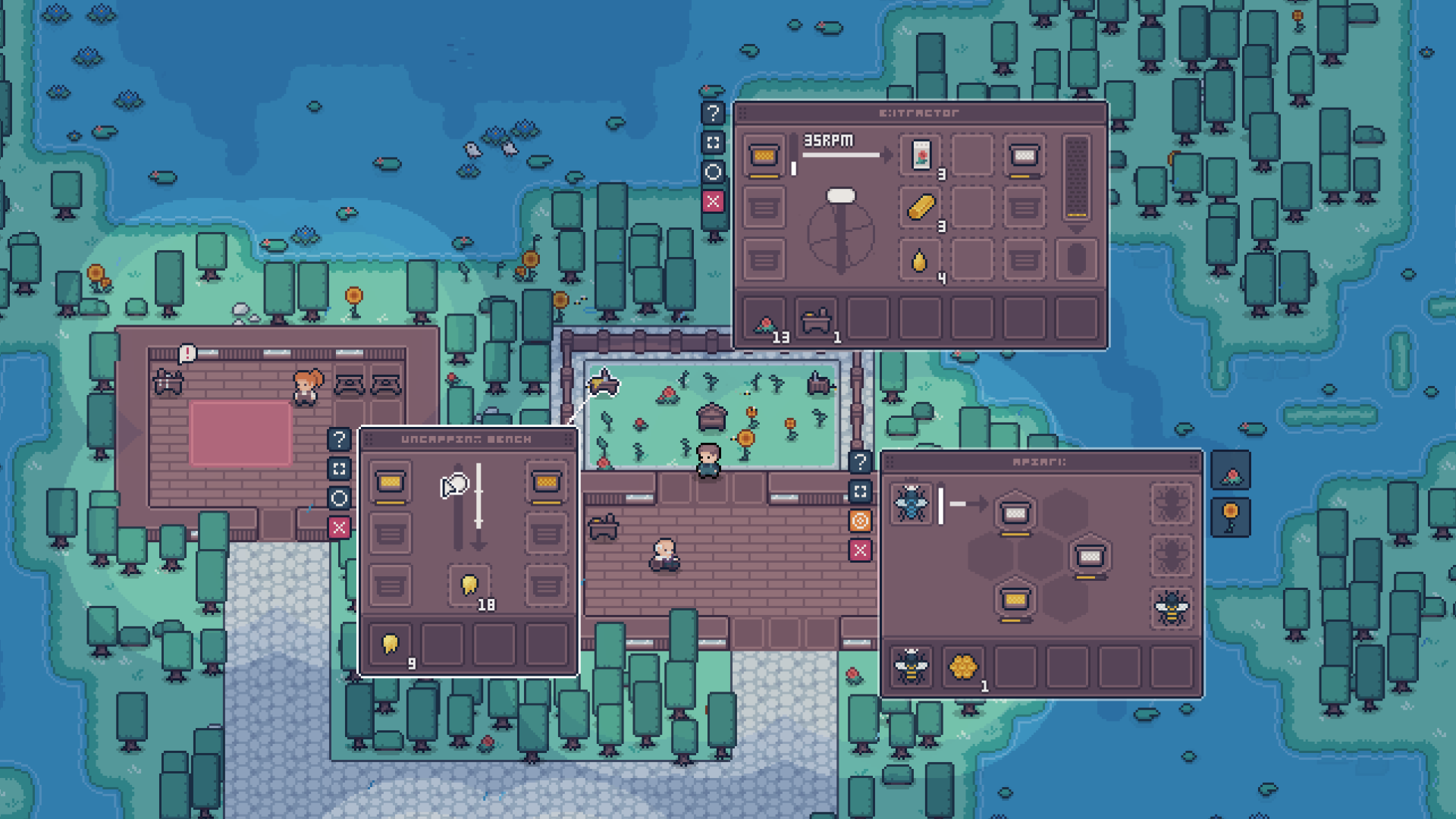
Multiple menus in the game allowing the player to fill frames in their beehives, uncap them, and then extract them for honey

APICO is a 2D beekeeping simulation and resource management game. Set in an archipelago where bees are commonplace, the player is tasked with discovering all of the species of bee in the world through exploration and cross-breeding. The game takes inspiration from real-life genetics and biology, with Punnett squares taking a key role in gameplay. Conservation of bees also plays into the mechanics of the game, with the player being rewarded for rehabilitating new species back into the wild.

There is also a heavy focus on menu management along with a multiple menu system, allowing for multiple menus to be open at once. A lot of the gameplay is done through these various in-game menus that have their own crafting minigames - like a "Sawbench" menu where you manually "chop" logs by dragging the mouse left and right on the interface, or a "Uncapper" menu when you "scrape" the Propolis from a Hive frame by dragging the mouse down. The developers talked more about these menu mechanics and the ability to have multiple menus open at once in an article for Game Developer.

== Development and release ==
The game is being developed by TNgineers, a small UK-based indie studio made up of Ell (ellraiser) and their brother, Jamie (metakitkat). The game's soundtrack is composed by German composer, Mothense, who has done both an official soundtrack plus a set of "bee-sides" that were ideas scrapped during the creation of the OST.

A key focus of the game was to make a relaxing, comforting game, with no real fail states or ways to lose. The developers mentioned this casual gameplay was something important to them especially with "the world being, you know, sh*t at the moment". They have mentioned that a portion of all sales will be donated to national and international beekeeping charities, and after getting their first sales through from Steam started to post their charity donations publicly.

A demo was originally released on Steam in September 2020, with multiple updates being released to keep the demo up to date with the current state of the game. The developers hadn't originally planned to get a publisher, but made the decision in January 2021 to team up with indie game publisher Whitethorn Games for support, and due to their casual/friendly ethos matching the focus for the game. At the same time, they also decided to move the game engine (previously JavaScript) into GameMaker Studio to help with console porting. A large update for the demo was released on World Bee Day 2021, which was the first update for the demo since the game was moved to GameMaker Studio.

The game was released on Steam on 20 May 2022 to coincide with World Bee Day 2022 and later released on Nintendo Switch on 7 July 2022. The game was released for PlayStation 4 and PlayStation 5 on 29 September 2022, and then Xbox One and Xbox Series X/S on 22 June 2023.

== Content updates ==
In the release announcement post it was mentioned that there would be "2-3 content updates" worked on post-release. These have been solidified into three named updates:

1. 2.0 I Can't Beelieve It's Not Butter(flies) - focusing on adding solitary bees & butterflies to the game
2. 3.0 What Lies Beeneath - aimed at filling in the oceans with content and adding "bee-fishing"
3. 4.0 Hive Of Industry - geared towards more light automation as well as a second more final ending "so we can all say goodbye together"

It was announced on 7 November that the first of the three updates, the "Butterfly Update" would release on all PC platforms on 12 November. This was then released for Switch and PlayStation on 11 May 2023. On 26 September, the "Ocean Update" was released for PC.

There have been no dates announced yet for the final update, or the 3.0 update for consoles, however Ell has mentioned in an FAQ in the TNgineer Discord that both the 3.0 and 4.0 updates will be combined into one final update for all consoles.
