= Xalavier Nelson Jr. =

American video game developer and writer

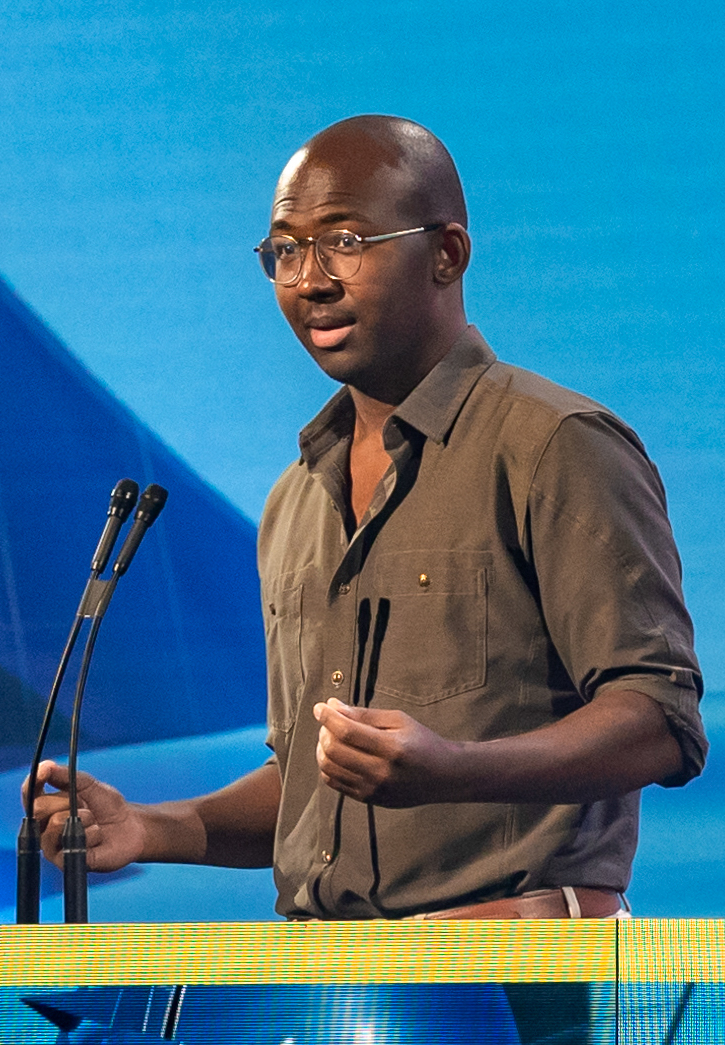
- Nelson in 2024
- Born: 1997 or 1998 (age 28–29)
- Citizenship: American
- Occupation: Video game developer
- Years active: 2019 - Present
- Notable work: El Paso, Elsewhere
- Website: strangescaffold.com

Xalavier Nelson Jr. (born 1997 or 1998) is an American video game developer and writer. He is founder of the indie game studio Strange Scaffold, which is known for video games such as El Paso, Elsewhere (2023) for which the studio received a D.I.C.E. Award and I Am Your Beast (2024).

Nelson has commented on working conditions in the video game industry, including practices such as crunch. He was inspired to create games with a focus on shorter playtime lengths and ethical production cycles, citing his frustration with burnout and perceived unhealthy industry practices. He previously wrote for the gaming news outlet PC Gamer, which he joined in 2017.

== Biography ==
=== Early life ===
Nelson was born in 1997 or 1998 and grew up in Texas. As a child, Nelson was unschooled, a free-form type of homeschooling. He particularly disliked writing, and instead read frequently, especially about video games and the video game industry. A GameSpot news article on the reviews for the 2011 game Duke Nukem Forever led to an interest in video game journalism. He eventually contacted some publishers to request copies of their video games to review. He wrote his first game reviews at 12 years old and published them to a personal WordPress blog.

=== Career ===
Nelson only began to be paid for journalistic work when he was of legal working age, while working at media outlets such as PC Gamer, Waypoint, and Polygon. He joined PC Gamer as a writer in 2017, and for two years, he wrote a column on game development for the publication.

After five years of this work, Nelson intended to become a game developer as he felt that a career as a journalist in the games industry was not sustainable. Around this time, at 17 years old, he made the realization that he wanted focus on producing video games, rather than constituent processes such as writing the narratives for games. After some time of completing freelance narrative design work for some titles and working on various self-released games, in 2019, he founded a game studio Strange Scaffold with an investment of $2,000 from his father. He previously described Strange Scaffold as a one-man "micro studio", which operates in a "constellation" model in which he contracts out work to multiple people on each game rather than employing them full-time as a larger or AAA studio would. Projects around this time included Can Androids Pray?, An Airport for Aliens Currently Run by Dogs (2021), and Space Warlord Organ Trading Simulator, with Game Developer magazine noting the particularly "eye-catching" titles and "internally consistent worlds" common to each game. By 2023, the studio released five games.

Development of the 2023 shooter game, El Paso, Elsewhere took about 10 months, after which Strange Scaffold almost ran out of money. Nelson said getting further funding was difficult because investors balked at his refusal to engage in what he felt was an unhealthy work environment. During this period of difficulty, Nelson fostered a "new relationship" with his existing Christian faith, specifically "being able to recenter those values in the context of games". A homage to the Max Payne series of action video games, the game sold 30,000 copies after the studio published it despite its repeated rejection by larger game studios. Nelson himself voiced the protagonist, the vampire hunter James Savage. The game received the 2024 D.I.C.E. Award for Outstanding Achievement for an Independent Game.

Nelson was listed as one of Forbes magazine's 30 Under 30 honorees for 2024 for his contributions to the gaming industry. At the Black in Gaming Awards at that year's Game Developers Conference, Nelson won the Indie Developer Award. In 2025, Nelson was named as part of BAFTA's Breakthrough cohort for the US.

== Commentary ==
=== Game industry practices ===
Nelson was inspired to create video games with a focus on shorter playtime lengths and ethical production cycles, citing his frustration with burnout and perceived unhealthy industry practices. Speaking on the ongoing reactions to an economic downturn in 2024, including lower investments, Nelson said that the industry should adopt practices used during such periods in the past: "... if we just make reasonable decisions based on the ecosystem before us [...] we can make a lot of money and make a lot of players happy without exploding in the process." In a 2024 TikTok video by Nelson, as described by The New York Times, he observes that "the industry views efficiency and quality as opposing forces – that good games require years of development". He has said that crunch—overtime required in the development process—continues to be common in the industry the largely because decision-makers in the industry have increasingly fostered developers who are focused on designing games and not thinking of how they should be released. In contrast, he stated that Strange Scaffold focuses on how to release its games from the start of the development process.

Speaking at the 2024 Game Developers Conference, Nelson was critical of the industry's treatment of game developers who are Black or other people of color. The New York Times wrote that Nelson's speech criticized "the double talk that underrepresented developers receive when pitching games to larger companies".

After the head of the game publisher Nexon claimed in 2025 that there was "widespread" usage of generative artificial intelligence (AI) within the industry, Nelson stated that many indie and AAA developers did not use AI and that it had been making video games worse.

=== Game design ===
In a 2018 interview on his narrative design work, Nelson stated that he most enjoyed working around a set of limitations or boundaries to best tell a story or evoke certain emotions in the player.

He recalls that his mother's belief that "many of the best stories have a love component" led El Paso, Elsewhere to incorporate personal experiences such as his faith and past relationships.

=== Faith ===
Nelson is Christian, specifically Protestant or some form of Protestantism, and he was raised in an evangelical Christian community. In interviews, he has occasionally spoken on what his faith means to him personally and how it connects to his work in creating games. He has acknowledged that Christianity has "deeply and intentionally harmed people."

== Selected works ==
Year	Game	Credited as
2019	Hypnospace Outlaw	Writer
2019	Can Androids Pray?	Writer
2020	Cellular Harvest	Writer
2020	Reigns: Beyond	Writer
2021	Adios	Producer
2021	An Airport for Aliens Currently Run by Dogs	Designer
2021	Skatebird	Writer
2021	Space Warlord Organ Trading Simulator	Designer
2023	Dreamfather	Designer; for The Real Unreal art exhibition
2023	El Paso, Elsewhere	Director; voice of protagonist, James Savage
2024	Life Eater	Director; voice of secondary protagonist, Johnny
2024	Clickolding	Director
2024	I Am Your Beast	Director; voice of protagonist, Alphonse Harding
2025	Defender's Quest 2: Mists of Ruin	Writer
2025	Skin Deep	Additional writing
2025	Teenage Mutant Ninja Turtles: Tactical Takedown	Director
2026	Space Warlord Baby Trading Simulator	Director
2026	Clive Barker's Hellraiser: Revival	Voice of protagonist, Aidan Lynch
