= Life Eater =

2024 video game

- Developer: Strange Scaffold
- Publishers: Strange Scaffold, Frosty Pop
- Director: Xalavier Nelson Jr.
- Producer: Candace Hudert
- Designers: Colin McInerney, Tom Vinita, Vaida Plankyte, RJ Lake
- Programmers: Timothy Gatton, Val Magri
- Artists: Marianeé Canales, Ben Chandler, Judy McCroary, Mothcula
- Writers: Xalavier Nelson Jr., Candace Hudert
- Composer: David Mason
- Engine: Unreal Engine 5
- Platform: Windows
- Release: 16 April 2024
- Mode: Single-player

Life Eater is a 2024 video game developed by Strange Scaffold and published by Strange Scaffold and Frosty Pop for Windows. The game is a narrative horror puzzle game in which the player is a murderer that uses an interactive timeline to learn the routines and vulnerabilities of their victims. The game was concepted by independent developer Xalavier Nelson Jr, who aimed to create a "horror fantasy kidnapping simulator" that explored themes of surveillance in a fantasy horror context. Upon release, Life Eater received mixed reviews, with reviewers noting the impact and ambition of its premise, but expressing mixed views on the effect of its gameplay and narrative to execute its concept.

== Gameplay ==
Puzzle gameplay in Life Eater requires players to fill in a timeline to identify the characteristics and routines of the correct target.

Life Eater is a puzzle game in which the player is a murderer that uses an interactive timeline similar to video editing software to plan an opportunity to abduct a specific victim nominated at the start of every stage. Each round of the game takes place over two phases, with the first phase set out on a timeline representing the routines of one or more victims. The timeline of each victim is segmented by empty slots representing their various activities throughout the days of the week. To uncover these activities and locate the appropriate opportunity to kidnap them, players select a series of actions that represent methods of stalking them. These actions are constrained by a time limit and suspicion meter, requiring the player to manage their time and not raise the meter. Once the suspicion meter passes a threshold three times, or the time limit runs out, the game is over. Some activities on the timeline can only be revealed by taking more intrusive actions at a greater cost of suspicion. Players can reduce the level of suspicion by undertaking activities at cost to their available time. Once the player identifies a sufficient percentage of the victim's activities in that week, they are able to select a victim to abduct.

The second phase of the game presents the player with statements about the correct victim, requiring them to demonstrate knowledge from the evidence they collected in the first phase of the game. Players answer these questions using an interface representing the sacrifice of the victim, removing certain bodily organs based on whether or not the victim met certain conditions such as their habits, living status and appearance. If the player removes the organs correctly based on these conditions, the player is successful, otherwise they must restart the stage. Certain conditions, such as whether the victim lived alone, requires the player to infer the nature of the victim based upon the evidence they have collected, occasionally from the habits of other characters that have been surveilled. As the game progresses, multiple characters are able to be monitored or abducted in the first phase of the game. The instructions on which targets are to be abducted also can be abstract, such as to "find a monster", requiring deeper investigation to abduct the correct victim.

== Plot ==
The player character, Ralph, is a "modern-day Druid" in servitude to Zimforth, a god that threatens to bring about the end of the world unless the player provides them with annual sacrifices. To meet these ends, Ralph abducts and murders specific targets identified by Zimforth by monitoring their personal lives and routines. He also abducts and imprisons a victim, Johnny, placing him in a cage. Over the years in service to Zimforth, Ralph develops increasing paranoia and guilt about their involvement in procuring sacrifices as they develop a one-sided friendship with Johnny. Throughout the game, it is left ambiguous as to whether Ralph is sane or truly tormented by the demands of Zimforth.

== Development and release ==
Life Eater was developed by Strange Scaffold, the studio of independent developer Xalavier Nelson Jr. Life Eater was developed following the securing of a five-game publishing contract with independent publisher Frosty Pop. Nelson Jr. stated that the concept arose from the desire to create a "kidnapping sim" with a horror-fantasy theme using timeline-based games like those used in John Wick Hex. The game intended to explore the "dark and interesting design questions" arising from the exploitation of "information culture" and surveillance, such as geotagging, to use for harm. The Saw film series and 10 Cloverfield Lane were also cited as inspiration for the concept of the game. Life Eater was announced with the release of a trailer on 6 March 2024, and released on 16 April.

== Reception ==
Reception

Aggregate score
Aggregator	Score
Metacritic	68%

Review scores
Publication	Score
Destructoid	5.5/10
Eurogamer	3/5
NME	4/5
Bloody Disgusting	3/5
Screen Rant	3.5/5
TheGamer	4/5

According to review aggregator platform Metacritic, Life Eater received "mixed or average" reviews from critics. Whilst all critics acknowledged the ambition and uniqueness of the game's concept, they expressed mixed views on the execution on its gameplay mechanics. Andy Brown of NME considered the gameplay to be "deeply immersive" in its details, but felt its repetitive mechanics became "formulaic" and "frustrating" by the end of the game. Similarly describing the gameplay as "routine" and "shallow", Zoey Handley of Destructoid critiqued the lack of instructions and trial-and-error gameplay. Ben Sledge of TheGamer felt the gameplay was "left wanting" in practice, stating that the reliance of the game on memory was "repetitive" and "frustrating". Rob Gordon of Screen Rant noted the "unique and innovative" aspects of gameplay, but felt that its execution lacked complexity, had a "barren" presentation not supplemented by imagery or animation, and resulted in frustrating trial and error. Aaron Boehm of Bloody Disgusting wrote that the game "struggles to balance the abstract nature of the mechanics with the narrative it's trying to tell". Kelsey Raynor of VG247 found the game to become "trivial" and "easy" once the mechanics of the game were learned by the player, although considered this issue to be minor due to the short playtime of the game.

Reviewers also provided mixed assessments about the game's narrative. Rob Gordon of Screen Rant commended the game's "impressive" and "well-written" narrative, highlighting its "oppressive atmosphere". Aaron Boehm of Bloody Disgusting also praised the depiction of the relationship between the player character and Johnny, citing the "warmth and relatability" in the writing style and its treatment of themes of "questioning your faith and how far you let your devotion take you". Ben Sledge of TheGamer found the game to have an "exemplary script", craft "simple, emotional stories" through its gameplay, and illustrate a "manipulative and transformative" depiction of the player character's descent into inhumanity. Noting the uncomfortable aspects of its intriguing and effective premise, Robert Purchese of Eurogamer felt the game "struggled to wrap a story around it" nor explore deeper topics, conclusions or consequences for the player's behavior. Andy Brown of NME praised the game's "unsettling story" and its "compelling" themes of "faith, love and duty", highlighting the cutscenes and voiceover performances. In spite of a "compelling and disturbing" premise, Zoey Handley of Destructoid noted that the "simple and distant" gameplay failed to connect with its characters, making it difficult for her "to care about the world or the people who inhabit it".
