= Space Warlord Organ Trading Simulator =

2021 video game

- Developer: Strange Scaffold
- Publisher: Strange Scaffold
- Designer: Xalavier Nelson Jr.
- Programmer: Sam Chiet
- Artists: Julia Minamata; Ben Chandler
- Composer: RJ Lake
- Platforms: Windows; Xbox One; Xbox Series X/S; Nintendo Switch
- Release: Windows, Xbox One, Xbox Series X/S; December 7, 2021; Nintendo Switch; April 29, 2022
- Genre: Business simulation game
- Mode: Single player

Space Warlord Organ Trading Simulator is a business simulation game developed and published by Strange Scaffold for Microsoft Windows, Xbox One, and Xbox Series X/S on December 7, 2021, and for Nintendo Switch on April 29, 2022. The game takes place in a far dystopian future where the player accrues power and wealth through the organ trade.

== Gameplay ==
Space Warlord Organ Trading Simulator is centered around "trading days", that each only last a couple of minutes, in which the player has to deal with rival traders who are after the same organs, clients who want organs with specific properties, potential scammers, and random events. Fulfilling client requests adds to the player's reputation, which is the game's equivalent of XP, and the higher a player's reputation, the more the gameplay opens up.

== Development ==
Space Warlord Organ Trading Simulator is compatible with the Kinect, a feature that was added "just for the hell of it". Lead designer Xalavier Nelson Jr. has offered a bounty of $50 to the first person to finish the campaign mode of the game entirely with the Kinect alone. On February 10, 2023, user "Swag Gucci Balenciaga Corndog" on Steam completed this bounty and submitted proof of her run.

The game was released on Microsoft Windows via Steam, Xbox One, Xbox Series X/S on December 7, 2021, and on the Nintendo Switch on April 29, 2022. To celebrate the Switch release the game added cross-over content from the videogames Inscryption, Bugsnax and Among Us on all platforms.

== Reception ==
The game received mixed reviews upon release, with the game having an aggregate score of 6.4 on Metacritic. The game was praised for its soundtrack, which Nic Reuben from The Guardian described as "incredibly stylish" and "one of the best of the year". The game also received praise for its dark humor and storytelling, but was criticized for its shallow gameplay.

== Sequel ==
A sequel, Space Warlord Baby Trading Simulator, was released on January 29, 2026.
