= Space Warlord Baby Trading Simulator =

2026 video game

- Developer: Strange Scaffold
- Publishers: Strange Scaffold, Frosty Pop
- Designer: Xalavier Nelson Jr.
- Programmer: Dan Pearce
- Artists: Julia Minamata; Ben Chandler
- Composer: Kris Kirk
- Platforms: Windows; Xbox Series X/S; Nintendo Switch; Nintendo Switch 2
- Release: Windows; January 29, 2026; Xbox Series X/S; March 26, 2026; Nintendo Switch, Nintendo Switch 2; July 9, 2026
- Genre: Business simulation game
- Mode: Single player

Space Warlord Baby Trading Simulator is a 2026 business simulation game developed by Strange Scaffold. It is a sequel to the studio's 2021 game Space Warlord Organ Trading Simulator.

The game takes place in a science fiction setting where future-predicting technology has deprecated conventional markets, so profit is instead made through trading stocks on the simulated life outcomes of alien babies.

== Gameplay ==
Space Warlord Baby Trading Simulator is a satirical stock market simulator in which the simulated lives of babies are financialized and traded on via shares of stock. The player is tasked with reaching specific profit thresholds in a limited span of time. A baby's financial value increases with positive life events and decreases with negative ones, allowing players to trade on volatility. Babies can be shorted to capitalize on expected downfall. The simulated lifespans can be impacted by injury and age, and unsold shares will be worthless upon a baby's death.

Financial consultants can be hired to provide information such as expected age of death and average baby worth. Players can additionally make side bets before starting to trade.

The gameplay of Space Warlord Baby Trading Simulator has been compared to the StreetPass game Market Crashers, as well as Drug Wars.

== Development ==
Space Warlord Baby Trading Simulator was released for Microsoft Windows on January 29, 2026 via Steam, for Xbox Series X/S on March 26, 2026, and for Nintendo Switch and Nintendo Switch 2 on July 9, 2026. The game was published by Strange Scaffold in coordination with Frosty Pop.

== Reception ==
Reception

Aggregate score
Aggregator	Score
Metacritic	78/100

The game received generally positive reviews from critics upon release, according to the review aggregation website Metacritic. Jenni Lada of Siliconera praised the dark humor and replay potential.

Tom Faber of the Financial Times identified the game as satire on the contemporary proliferation of meme stocks, cryptocurrency, and prediction markets, stating that it "interrogat[es] both the human urge to gamble and the logic behind our sometimes absurd financial systems".
