= Lakeburg Legacies =

- Developer: Ishtar Games
- Publisher: Ishtar Games
- Engine: Unity
- Platform: Windows
- Release: WW: July 20, 2023
- Genre: Simulation
- Mode: Single-player

Lakeburg Legacies is a 2023 simulation video game developed by Ishtar Games. Players manage a medieval village and the villagers' relationships.

== Gameplay ==
Players manage the medieval town of Lakeburg and its inhabitants. Villagers are randomly generated. To maintain happiness levels, players need to assign villagers to jobs they enjoy and keep the relevant workplace properly staffed. Players are also responsible for the villagers' relationships. Sexual orientation does not matter; any villager can marry a non-relative, and any couple can have children. Children leave home when they reach 18 and must be provided with their own home. If two parents remarry, and both have pre-existing children, children who can't fit in the new family's house are orphaned. If players successfully match couples, they can use the generated love points to attract new villagers to the village by causing them to fall in love with an existing villager. Otherwise, new villagers can be bribed into immigrating to Lakeburg. Games last for 30, 75, or 100 years. At the end of a game, players can unlock artwork depicting life in Lakeburg depending on how successfully they managed the town.

== Development ==
The developer, studio Ishtar Games, is based in Lille and Bordeaux, France. It released Lakeburg Legacies for Windows on July 20, 2023.

== Reception ==
On OpenCritic, it has a top critic average of 62/100, and 43% of all surveyed critics recommended it. Rock Paper Shotgun said "it's pretty and has smart ideas", but they felt the lack of consequences for ignoring villagers' happiness encouraged min-maxing to the degree that the town became dystopian. Finding similar faults, PC Gamer called it "an awkward, goalless mix of contradictions and impersonal systems". Though they said the simulation elements were not complex, Siliconera recommended it to fans of city management games who will enjoy watching their villagers' lives play out virtually. Eurogamer called it a "capable village management sim" that does not live up to the potential of the social management aspects.
