= I Am Your Beast =

2024 video game

- Developer: Strange Scaffold
- Publisher: Strange Scaffold
- Director: Xalavier Nelson Jr.
- Producer: HN Hoffmann
- Designer: Jim Brown
- Programmer: Dan Pearce
- Composer: RJ Lake
- Engine: Unity
- Platforms: Windows; iOS; Playstation 5; Xbox Series X/S; Nintendo Switch; Nintendo Switch 2
- Release: Microsoft Windows; September 10, 2024; iOS; February 18, 2025; Playstation 5, Xbox Series X/S; June 25, 2025; Nintendo Switch, Nintendo Switch 2; October 20, 2026
- Genre: First-person shooter
- Mode: Single-player

I Am Your Beast is a 2024 first-person shooter video game developed and published by Strange Scaffold. It was released for Windows in September 2024, iOS in February 2025, Playstation 5 and Xbox Series X/S in June 2025, and was released for Nintendo Switch and Nintendo Switch 2 on October 20, 2026. The game was announced on June 9, 2024 at the PC Gaming Show.

== Gameplay ==
I Am Your Beast is a first-person shooter that pits Special Agent Alphonse Harding against the fictional "Covert Operations Initiative" or "COI" after he declines a mission from his superiors. As Harding, players progress through several levels with varying objectives, including eliminating a certain number of enemies, interacting with laptops, or destroying certain items of interest, and then reaching the exit to complete the level. To aid in this endeavor, players can run, slide, and climb certain objects.

Players usually enter a level without any equipment and can find weapons or items to use or pick up off of enemies. When a weapon is picked up, Alphonse can throw it to stun an enemy, knocking them to the ground where the player can finish them off with a stomp. Each weapon breaks after a certain amount of use and the guns cannot be reloaded. The player can restore health only through gathering up herbs or taking COI medical kits, which regenerate or immediately restore his health respectively. Harding can also be under a bleeding effect, which constantly drains health.

A variety of items, tactics, and weapons are available to the player in a level. The player can carry one weapon at a time, which can be a pistol, shotgun, assault rifle, or sniper rifle, or a melee weapon, such as a piece of tree bark or a conventional combat knife, alongside a single piece of equipment, which can be bear traps, claymores, or RPGs. Later on, armor can be acquired to add an additional layer of protection. The players can also interact with several objects in the environment, being able to kill enemies by explosions through explosive barrels and through swarms of insects by shooting nests. The Quitting Time expansion adds a new weapon, in the form of a riot shield that can be thrown like a boomerang.

A grading system is also present, where, at the end of a level, the player is scored based on the amount of killed enemies and how fast they beat the level, from D to S rank. In the level, the amount of time the player has to beat the level is represented by a bar at the top of the screen which steadily decreases. If it drains completely, the player will be forced to restart. As the player kills enemies, the bar will regenerate, with certain types of kills will providing a greater bonus. For example, kills with a thrown knife will provide less bonus time than a kill through an explosive.

== Plot ==
Alphonse Harding is a former operative of the Covert Operations Initiative (COI), implied to be suffering from post-traumatic stress disorder. When Harding discovers and kills a squad of COI agents in the forest he lives in, his former superior, General Charles Burkin, attempts to call him back for an additional job. Despite Burkin's attempts to convince Harding that he owes him for the squad that he killed, Harding retorts that Burkin owes him for the several "last jobs" he had him perform past his retirement, demanding that Burkin pull his agents back. When Burkin refuses, Harding begins to carry out a series of raids on the COI agents stationed there, using a tunnel system to escape his pursuers. After Harding carries out several raids, Burkin opts to call in a demolitions squad to destroy the forest, angering Harding.

Later on, a COI agent named Byron Ford contacts Harding on an abandoned COI communicator frequency, offering intelligence on the developments of Burkin's manhunt in exchange for being spared, to which Harding agrees. He continues to raid the camps the COI puts up, destroying their equipment and killing their personnel, with Ford informing him of the deployment of riflemen, an attack chopper invulnerable to conventional firearms, and shock troops with armor.

After several additional raids, Burkin, with support from the United States government, declares Harding unfit for duty, adding that he will be executed at the earliest opportunity, with Ford later informing that Burkin is "calling in every favor he's got" against Harding. After further raids, Ford then informs that Burkin is also preparing the attack chopper for deployment, also revealing that he has been piloting it, implying that his family is being used as leverage against him. Byron also directs Harding to a COI camp with heavy artillery as to give Harding a fighting chance.

Using RPGs, Harding downs the chopper, rescuing Byron from the wreckage out of gratitude. He then removes a tracker from Byron, allowing him to escape undetected with his family. Afterward, Burkin declares that he will finish his manhunt of Harding, but Harding is once again able to destroy more COI equipment and kill more COI personnel.

Unable to take any more losses, Burkin concedes to Harding and pulls back his forces, though not before warning Harding that more individuals will attempt to attack him, and that Burkin will no longer be able to protect him. Harding replies that it was never his job in the first place.

Some time later, Harding recounts in his diary his discovery of additional abandoned COI camps, and writes how he feels less of the COI's influence, hopeful for his future.

=== Support Group ===
In a free expansion, called Support Group, surviving members of the COI forces hunting Harding come together in a support group, and recount particularly odd or sardonically humorous incidents they were involved in, which then inform the themes of the nine challenge levels in the expansion.

As the player completes levels, the stories become increasingly unbelievable, with the survivors regaling the others tales of Harding "falling out of the sky," "walking through fire," and "punching someone's head off," with the last story being reflected by an in-game power up allowing Harding to kill enemies with a single punch or thrown weapon.

However, the session is interrupted by General Burkin, who states that Harding never existed, dismissing the idea of an "invincible" soldier killing hundreds of COI soldiers as impossible. After the player completes the final level of the expansion, Burkin later clarifies that he intends to testify in front of Congress that Harding never existed. He consequently threatens the COI survivors to supply corroborating testimonials, or else he would have their families tortured, to which the survivors concede.

=== Quitting Time ===
A prequel expansion, titled Quitting Time, takes place in Southeast Asia prior to Harding's string of "last jobs" during his tenure with the COI. The COI is noted to be a clandestine private military company that works both officially and unofficially to complete contracts given by the United States government. Alphonse Harding, working out of not only a desire to do good in the world and out of a feeling of debt to his handler, the then-Colonel Charles Burkin, operates as one of the COI's agents.

Harding is deployed to an unidentified region in Southeast Asia, after he has made a request for leave. He is intended to act on intelligence that the Patriotic Defense League (PDL) has allegedly prepared arms and munitions to support a major act of terror in the United States. Upon discovering the level of militarization the PDL has developed in the area, Alphonse is then tasked to wipe out the forces stationed in the jungle. Initially, Alphonse believes the PDL is going rogue by operating with US funds and attempting to launch a terror attack, but he continuously struggles with the feeling that with so much blood on his hands that he may go too far, even offering a group of PDL soldiers the chance to surrender. Once Harding has reached their base of operations, he is explicitly ordered by Burkin to burn down their command tent rather than investigate it, but Harding disobeys orders and enters the tent, discovering that the PDL was not planning any terror attack at all. However, as he discovers that the PDL was planning to operate in an area that the COI also has an operation planned, he is tranquilized by a fellow COI agent, Madelyn, who had been tailing him to ensure his mission was completed.

During his debrief, Burkin apologizes, stating that Madelyn was an agent attached to him by high command to ensure Harding completed his mission given his recent request for leave and his morality. At Harding's request, Burkin then explains the operation was designed to cripple the PDL as they continuously underbid for contracts, harming the COI's cash flow, justifying it as making sure the best people for the job will help keep the US safe. After Burkin leaves, Harding can only lament on the flawed nature of the system.

== Development and release ==
Developer Strange Scaffold is based in El Paso, Texas. The game was released for Windows on September 10, 2024, iOS on February 18, 2025 and Playstation 5 and Xbox Series X/S on June 25, 2025. Nine levels were added in a free expansion in November 2024. The expansion, called Support Group, revolves around members of the Covert Operations Initiative and the stories they tell about Harding, rather than being from the perspective of Harding himself. Versions of the game for Nintendo Switch and Nintendo Switch 2 were scheduled to release on October 20, 2026, alongside a new paid story expansion Quitting Time, which serves as a prequel to the main game.

== Reception ==
Reception

Aggregate scores
Aggregator	Score
Metacritic	79/100
OpenCritic	88% recommend

Review scores
Publication	Score
IGN	7/10
The Guardian	4/5
Sports Illustrated	7/10

I Am Your Beast received "generally positive" ratings from critics, having a score of 79 out of 100 on Metacritic based on 13 reviews. OpenCritic determined that 88% of critics recommended the game.

Christian Donlan described it as a "masterwork of briskness and efficiency" in a review for The Guardian, and it received a 7/10 rating from Tristan Ogilvie in IGN. Ryan Woodrow, writing for Sports Illustrated, found the game difficult to come back to, but enjoyed the initial "whirlwind of action and excitement", lamenting that as the game progressed the stages just became larger without amping up the action.
