= MiniMAX Discount =

miniMAX Discount logo

miniMAX Discount was a supermarket chain from Romania, owned by businessman Dinu Patriciu.

miniMAX supermarkets were mainly found in smaller urban areas, with populations below 200,000, which were not served by international retail chains such as Carrefour, Auchan, SPAR, Billa or Metro Cash and Carry. miniMAX stores were based on the discounter concept, selling a more limited range of goods at low prices. Minimax discount is now bankrupt in the city of Subscriptions.
