= Wild West Dynasty =

- Cover art
- Developer: Moon Punch Studio
- Publisher: Toplitz Productions
- Platforms: Microsoft Windows, Playstation 5
- Release: February 16, 2023 (early access); August 22, 2024 (full release)
- Genres: Action-adventure; City-building; Construction and management simulation; Open world; Role-playing; Survival; Western
- Mode: Single-player

Wild West Dynasty is a Western city-building simulation video game released on February 16, 2023 for early access on Steam, developed by Moon Punch Studio and published by Toplitz Productions. Set in 19th-century Western United States, players can build their own ranch, provide food and wealth and more settlers join their settlements for happiness. The player can build, grow, and manage a town around it in an effort to "become the most powerful man in the West.". The game received its full release on August 22, 2024.

== Gameplay ==
Wild West Dynasty features many elements including action-adventure, city-building, construction and management, open world, role-playing, and survival gameplay in a Western setting. The game can be played in either first or third-person perspective as players navigate survival gameplay as they manage resources while building a settlement. Gameplay also allows players the possibility of starting a family, the ability to explore caves and mines, and to discover secrets and treasures.

== Synopsis ==
=== Setting ===
Wild West Dynasty is set in the American West during the 19th century.

=== Plot ===
Wild West Dynasty features a story with missions that include branching dialogue as well as consequences for players' choices. Players can also choose to experience an optional story, playing as John Ryder in the setting of Red Rock.

== Marketing and release ==
Wild West Dynasty was announced in March 2021. The game was later released in early access on February 16, 2023. It received its full release on August 22, 2024. It was released for Playstation 5 in March, 2026.
