= Spirit Swap: Lofi Beats to Match-3 To =

2025 video game

- Key art
- Developers: Soft Not Weak, LLC
- Publishers: Soft Not Weak, LLC
- Platforms: Windows; macOS; Xbox One; Xbox Series X/S
- Release: WW: February 3, 2025
- Genre: Puzzle
- Mode: Multiplayer; single-player

Spirit Swap: Lofi Beats to Match-3 To is a puzzle video game developed and published by Soft Not Weak, LLC. It was released digitally for Microsoft Windows, macOS, Xbox One, and Xbox Series X/S on February 3, 2025. The game follows Samar, a queer witch, and it includes dating sim and visual novel elements.

== Gameplay ==
The four spirits in the bottom right of the board are arranged in a square, allowing Samar to cast a spell.

During puzzle gameplay, spirits continually appear from the bottom of the board. Players swap pairs of spirits that are horizontally adjacent to each other, and lining up three or more of the same spirit makes those spirits disappear from the board, while also filling a meter for casting beneficial spells. Spells also require positioning spirits into certain patterns before they can be used.

After completing the game's story mode, players can freely choose which characters they want to interact with. Players can date multiple characters in a single playthrough.

Additional features include an Endless mode and Versus battles between two players.

== Development and release ==
Developer Soft Not Weak, LLC is based in Washington and Oregon. Spirit Swap: Lofi Beats to Match-3 To was inspired by the puzzle gameplay and aesthetics of Panel de Pon and other girls' video games, with Spirit Swap's creative director Alex Abou Karam stating that the game was initially developed in response to the discontinuation of Sailor Moon Drops, a fantasy match-3 game. The game's setting, Demashq, is intended to be "a fictional Levantine-Arab fantasy that is hopefully distant from the usual orientalist or 'terrorist' depictions [players] see of it". The game's characters are based on members of the team and their ideal game character ideas, leading to diversity in the characters' races, body types, and gender identities.

Soft Not Weak, a worker-owned cooperative, was established in 2019, and they ran a Kickstarter campaign for Spirit Swap in 2021. The game was ultimately released for Microsoft Windows, macOS, Xbox One, and Xbox Series X/S on February 3, 2025.

== Reception ==
Reception

Aggregate score
Aggregator	Score
OpenCritic	80% recommend (Note: Based on 10 reviews)
