= Beasts of Maravilla Island =

2021 video game

- Developer: Banana Bird Studios
- Publisher: Whitethorn Digital
- Director: Michelle Olson
- Platforms: macOS, Nintendo Switch, Windows, Xbox One, PlayStation 4, PlayStation 5
- Release: Mac, Switch, Windows; June 12, 2021; Xbox One; July 9, 2021; PS4, PS5; November 3, 2022
- Genre: Photography
- Mode: Single-player

Beasts of Maravilla Island is a photography video game developed by Banana Bird Studios and published by Whitethorn Digital. It was released for Windows, macOS, and Nintendo Switch in June 2021, for Xbox One in July 2021, and for PlayStation 4 and PlayStation 5 in November 2022. The player takes the role of Maria Montez, a young wildlife photographer who travels to a magical island in order to document its creatures, in an effort to make people believe in magic and restore the island's power.

The game received overall positive reviews from critics for all of its versions, praising its setting, graphics, and gameplay, but criticizing its technical issues, lack of creative options and lack of replay value. The game received updates after release that improved performance, fixed bugs, and added accessibility features.

== Plot ==
The game begins with Marina Montez, a wildlife photographer, sailing to the island, having found her grandfather's journal and intending to investigate its claims about magical creatures. When she arrives at the island, she notices an ethereal stag that vanishes. She gradually learns that her grandfather wanted to ensure the preservation of the island by sharing its beauty with the world, and uses the journal as her guide to explore the island.

== Reception ==
Reception

Aggregate score
Aggregator	Score
Metacritic	(NS) 59/100

Review scores
Publication	Score
CD-Action	6/10
Screen Rant	3/5

The game received an aggregate score of 59/100 on Metacritic for its Switch version, indicating "mixed or average reviews".

Laura Gray of Screen Rant rated the Switch version 3/5 stars, praising its creatures, setting, and artwork, and saying the gameplay was simple and intuitive, but that the game needed a few patches. She called the biggest setback in the game its glitches and bugs, recommending that climbing animations be smoothed out.

The game's PC version received a 6/10 from CD-Action, calling it charming yet unpolished, and criticizing the game's photo mode as well as interactions with the environment.
