= Elderand =

2023 video game

- Developers: Mantra; Sinergia Games
- Publisher: Graffiti Games
- Director: Will Fernandes
- Engine: Unity
- Platforms: Microsoft Windows; Nintendo Switch; iOS; Android; Xbox Series X/S; Xbox One
- Release: February 16, 2023: Windows, Nintendo Switch; WW: February 16, 2023 iOS, Android; WW: September 26, 2023 Xbox Series X/S, Xbox One; WW: November 30, 2023
- Genre: Metroidvania
- Mode: Single-player

Elderand is a 2023 Metroidvania video game developed by Brazilian studios Mantra and Sinergia Games and published by Graffiti Games. The developers cited Castlevania: Symphony of the Night and Lovecraftian horror as influences. The player controls a mercenary exploring a monster-filled world and investigating a cult.

It was released for Microsoft Windows and Nintendo Switch on February 16, 2023, followed by iOS and Android on September 26, 2023, and Xbox Series X/S and Xbox One on November 30, 2023.

== Gameplay ==
Elderand is a two-dimensional side-scrolling Metroidvania with action RPG elements. The player takes on the role of a nameless mercenary who washes ashore in a mysterious land overrun by creatures. Combat offers a range of weapon types such as swords, axes, daggers, whips, bows and magic staves, each with different statistics and combat uses. Shields can block incoming attacks and a backdash allows the player to evade.

An RPG-style leveling system lets players put points into health, strength, dexterity and mind, and the character's appearance can also be customized. Defeated enemies and exploration provide items that can be used to upgrade weapons. Progression unlocks traversal abilities such as a double jump, air dash and grappling hook. These abilities can be used to access previously blocked areas of the map.

Over 60 enemy types and roughly a dozen bosses are spread across environments ranging from forests and a cursed cathedral to floating islands and Elderand itself. The story is presented through notes and correspondence found throughout the game, and optional content like cult sacrifices and hidden areas can affect the game's outcome.

== Development ==
Creative director Will Fernandes began developing Elderand solo around 2015. He initially built the project in GameMaker before migrating to Unity, where a larger developer community and wider talent pool could support the work. After the game won awards at Brazilian gaming events, Fernandes said the positive reception encouraged him to continue development, and an investment round made it possible to bring on more developers.

The expanded team included members from across Brazil and abroad, with development handled jointly by Fernandes' studio Mantra, based in Salvador, Bahia, and co-developer Sinergia Games. American publisher Graffiti Games signed on to publish the title internationally.

Fernandes cited Castlevania: Symphony of the Night as the game's primary inspiration, particularly its controls, secrets, level design, boss encounters and gothic visual style. The team also drew on Lovecraftian horror for the game's creature design and atmosphere. Development from initial concept to release spanned roughly nine years.

== Reception ==
Reception

Aggregate scores
Aggregator	Score
Metacritic	70/100 (PC); 70/100 (NS)
OpenCritic	70/100

Review scores
Publication	Score
Nintendo Life	6/10
The Escapist	Positive
RPGFan	68/100
TouchArcade	3.5/5 stars

Elderand received "mixed or average reviews", according to review aggregator Metacritic. The Windows version holds a score of 70/100 based on 17 critic reviews, while the Nintendo Switch version also holds a 70/100 from 5 reviews. On OpenCritic, the game has an average of 70/100 from 22 critics, with 43% recommending it.

Several critics considered the game to lack originality. Scott McCrae of Nintendo Life praised the enemy design, worldbuilding and soundtrack, but felt the game did not break new ground, though he acknowledged it as an impressive debut.

Jesse Galena of The Escapist praised the spritework and backgrounds but criticised the combat against certain enemies. Shaun Musgrave of TouchArcade praised the pixel art and world-building but wrote that the game failed to bring anything novel to a saturated genre, calling it "decent, but decent only gets you so far."

Dom Kim of RPGFan compared its price with those of Hollow Knight and Ori and the Will of the Wisps, arguing that those games offered better value.
