= Batora: Lost Haven =

2022 video game

- Developer: Stormind Games
- Publisher: Team17
- Composer: Ron Fish
- Engine: Unreal Engine
- Platforms: Microsoft Windows; PlayStation 4; PlayStation 5; Xbox One; Xbox Series X/S; Nintendo Switch
- Release: Windows, PS4, PS5, XONE, XSX/S; 20 October 2022; Nintendo Switch; 6 April 2023; Amazon Luna; 13 April 2023
- Genre: Action adventure
- Mode: Single-player

Batora: Lost Haven is a 2022 video game developed by Stormind Games and published by Team17. It was released for Microsoft Windows, PlayStation 4, PlayStation 5, Xbox One and Xbox Series X/S on 20 October 2022, for Nintendo Switch on 6 April 2023 and for Amazon Luna on 13 April 2023. The game received mixed reviews, with its combat and story being praised by some critics, and called flawed by others.

== Plot ==
Batora: Lost Haven takes place in a post-apocalyptic world, with most of the Earth destroyed after a mysterious event. The main character is Avril, a 16-years old girl, who is suffering the death of her older sister Rose due to this event. Avril and her friend Mila discover two amulets connected to two unknown entities, the Sun and the Moon. After this, both of them are transported to Gryja, the planet representing the earth element.

Batora: Lost Haven brings the player to four different planets - each guarding an elemental essence - to develop and acquire the necessary physical and mental power for Avril. The story has a branching narrative, with four different endings determined by the player's decisions.

== Gameplay ==
Batora: Lost Haven allows the player to switch the protagonist between two different natures to battle enemies. In purple mode, Avril can use attack from a distance with psychic powers; in orange mode she can use melee attacks with her sword. All enemies, except hybrids that can be hit with both forms, have a corresponding color that matches the form that should be used.

To customize Avril's build, the player either collects runes during the main missions, or purchases them in certain shops. Each rune allows the player to increase the stats of both forms. To be able to use them, special points are unlocked by advancing the story, depending on the choices made. The game has a branching narrative that allows the player to unlock Conqueror or Defender points depending on the choices made throughout the story. The choices lead to one of four endings. Afterwards, the player can enter a more difficult New Game Plus using the skills and runes acquired in the first run.

A patch was released on 21 December on Steam and later also on consoles which introduced three different difficulties, which the player can select throughout the adventure as needed.

== Reception ==
Reception

Aggregate scores
| Aggregator | Score |
|---|---|
| Metacritic | PC: 68/100; PS5: 72/100; XSXS: 76/100 |
| OpenCritic | 30% recommend |

Review score
| Publication | Score |
|---|---|
| RPGFan | 82/100 |

Batora: Lost Haven received "generally favorable" reviews, according to review aggregator Metacritic for the Xbox Series X/S version and "mixed or average" reviews for the PC and PlayStation 5 version. Fellow review aggregator OpenCritic assessed that the game received fair approval, being recommended by 30% of critics.

Audra Bowling of RPGFan rated the game 82/100 points, stating that the story was "thought-provoking", and had "excellent use of decision-making, gorgeous artwork, fantastic music, fun puzzle elements, enjoyable combat when it hits the right notes". The Games Machine called it "a great isometric action RPG, with awesome boss battles and multiple endings to increase its longevity". Despite this, RPG Site called the narrative "mediocre" and highlighted a "thin structure" for gameplay, while indicating that the game had "adequate combat and respectable art".

The soundtrack, created by composer Ron Fish, former author of the soundtracks of the Batman: Arkham series and God of War franchise, also met with positive reviews, including that of RPGFan, who noted the "stunning and powerful soundtrack permeating the game".

Jason Bohn of Hardcore Gamer rated the game 3/5 points, saying that the game had exciting potential, and that it was a "smart move" for the studio, but was not yet at the level of required playing. Saying that the story initially felt simplistic and silly, he said that it later revealed more nuance due to its non-linear nature and elements of choice. He also called the combat and RPG systems enjoyable, but not particularly complex, and in need of tweaking.

=== Awards ===
| Year | Award | Category | Result | Ref |
|---|---|---|---|---|
| 2019 | DStars | Best New Studio | Won | |
| 2020 | Italian Video Game Awards | Outstanding Italian Company | Won | |
| 2021 | WN Dev Contest for Unreal Engine Developers | Best Game awarded by Epic Games | Won | |
| 2021 | DevGAMM | Grand prize | Won | |
