= Firegirl: Hack 'n Splash Rescue =

2021 video game

- Developer: Dejima
- Publisher: Thunderful Games
- Engine: Unreal Engine 4
- Platforms: Windows; Nintendo Switch; PlayStation 4; PlayStation 5; Xbox One; Xbox Series X/S
- Release: Windows; WW: December 14, 2021; Consoles; WW: June 22, 2022
- Genre: Platform
- Mode: Single-player

Firegirl: Hack 'n Splash Rescue is a platform game developed by Dejima and published by Thunderful Games.

== Gameplay ==
Players control a firefighter who must rescue citizens and defeat fire-based monsters attacking her city. Firegirl: Hack 'n Splash Rescue is a side-scrolling platform game, though the world is 3D. The levels are procedurally generated. Players have a limited amount of water they can use, and there are time limits, both of which can be replenished.

== Development ==
Developer Dejima is based in Sapporo, Japan. Thunderful Games published Firegirl: Hack 'n Splash Rescue for Windows on December 14, 2021. Under the name Firegirl: Hack 'n Splash Rescue DX, ports to PlayStation 4 and 5, Xbox One and Series X/S, and Switch followed on June 22, 2022. This version is rebalanced and adds additional content. The Windows version was updated to it for free.

== Reception ==
Firegirl: Hack 'n Splash Rescue received mixed reviews on Metacritic. Hardcore Gamer said the DX update is fun and challenging, though more fair than the original release. TouchArcade said it can be repetitive, and they criticized combination of time limits and procedurally generated levels. However, they said the challenge can make winning satisfying. Although they praised the pixel art graphics, Nintendo World Report disliked the level design and gameplay. Both TouchArcade and Nintendo World Report complained of technical issues on the Switch.
