= The Outbound Ghost =

- Developer: Conradical Games
- Publisher: Digerati
- Platforms: Nintendo Switch, PlayStation 4, PlayStation 5, Windows, Xbox One, Xbox Series X and Series S
- Release: November 30, 2022
- Genre: Role-playing
- Mode: Single-player

The Outbound Ghost is a 2022 fantasy role-playing video game developed by Conradical Games and published by Digerati. The game was released on Windows and Nintendo Switch, PlayStation 4, PlayStation 5, Xbox One, and Xbox Series X and Series S, on November 30, 2022, and received mixed reviews, with Conradical Games openly feuding with Digerati over the quality of the release.

== Plot ==
The game focuses on a ghost who tries to uncover of how the residents of the town of Outbound suddenly died. He also guides other souls into the afterlife.

== Gameplay ==
The game is an RPG. The combat use a point-based, turn-based system, where the player and the enemies will use points to select actions to defeat each other.

== Development ==
The Outbound Ghost was funded through Kickstarter. The game was influenced by the Paper Mario series. It was originally planned as an adventure game, but the additional funds raised through Kickstarter and the partnership with publisher Digerati allowed it to develop into a more ambitious RPG.

The developer released video development diaries on YouTube throughout the game's development.

== Release ==
The game was initially released on November 30, 2022.

In December 2022, director Conrad Grindheim released a statement in which he stated that his relationship with Digerati had dissolved and that he wanted to reclaim the publishing rights from them,and that he was unsatisfied with the version of the game the publisher had released. He urged people not to buy the game in the form it had been released in.

He also then allegedly vandalised the game's Steam storepage, and attempted to have the game removed from all digital storefronts. The game was then pulled from Steam.

Grindheim then issued DMCA takedowns on digital storefronts to have the game removed from sale, while also accusing the publisher of withholding royalties.

Digerati then responded by filing a lawsuit against Conradical, for false statements and wilful breach of contract. In a statement, the publisher said that it was not seeking money, but that it wanted Conradical to complete its obligations for the game, and to stop speaking negatively about them.

On October 20, 2024, Grindheim confirmed on Twitter that the lawsuit had been resolved, and that the game had returned to digital storefronts.

== Reception ==
The Outbound Ghost received mixed reviews and holds a score of 65 percent on Metacritic.

Nintendo Life awarded it a score of five out of ten, praising the soundtrack the soundtrack, environments, and player choices in battles, but criticising the plot and exploration elements, saying, "The heart is definitely there, with some great music and environments to go along with adorable little ghost characters, but a shallow battle system, a meandering narrative, and fuzzy presentation left us wanting in just about every ghostly regard."

RPG Site awarded it a score of four out of ten, criticising the gameplay and crafting elements, saying, "The Outbound Ghost is a pale imitation that I don't recommend playing."

Digitally Downloaded awarded it a more positive review, acknowledging that the conflicts between the developer and publisher would have affected the overall quality, saying, "So I’d say The Outbound Ghost is worth playing because the story is actually quite good (and the graphics are charming when they’re not blurry), but maybe not until the developer can deliver the improved version that he’s promising."

RPGFan awarded it 6.0 out of 10, praising the visuals and character designs, but criticizing the story, backtracking, exploration, and combat, saying, "While there is a lot of promise here, The Outbound Ghost just doesn’t reach its potential."

The Escapist awarded it a highly negative review, saying, "I cannot recommend buying this game to any type of player. If you’ve played Paper Mario and Bug Fables and are looking for more of the same, this isn’t it. It also isn’t worth your time on its own merits, being a decent first game with a lot of passion that ends in monotony."
