= Phantom Abyss =

- Developer: Team WIBY
- Publisher: Devolver Digital
- Designers: Ben Marrinan; Jed Dawson; Alex Butterfield; Ari Levi
- Programmers: Josh Sanderson; Bradley Seymour
- Artists: Motze Asher; Alex Murdoch
- Composer: Cedar Jones
- Engine: Unreal Engine
- Platforms: Windows; Xbox Series X/S
- Release: WW: January 25, 2024
- Genre: Action-adventure
- Modes: Single-player, multiplayer

Phantom Abyss is a 2024 action-adventure video game developed by Team WIBY and published by Devolver Digital. Players attempt to escape trap-filled temples using a whip, like in the Indiana Jones franchise.

== Gameplay ==
Players explore ancient, trap-filled temples while equipped with a whip. It combines elements of action-adventure and 3D platform games using procedurally generated maps. It features asynchronous multiplayer in that players play alongside phantoms of players who have previously attempted that level, similar to how ghost cars work in racing games. However, the phantoms can affect the current game by setting off traps and opening doors, for example.

== Development ==
Some of the developers had previously made Mr. Shifty. When the team changed, they reincorporated as Team WIBY, an acronym for "Will It Be You?", a previous title for Phantom Abyss. They are based in Brisbane, Australia. The game designer, Ben Marrinan, wanted to explore some aspects of battle royale games, such as having multiple players competing against each other. Despite its similarities to the Indiana Jones and Tomb Raider franchises, Marrinan said he was not very familiar with them, though they remain influences. Some of the features, such as asynchronous multiplayer and procedural generation, came from having a small development team. Phantom Abyss entered early access in June 2021. Devolver Digital released it for Windows and Xbox Series X/S on January 25, 2024.

== Reception ==
Reception

Aggregate score
Aggregator	Score
Metacritic	72/100

Review scores
Publication	Score
Destructoid	7.5/10
Hardcore Gamer	3.5/5
Shacknews	7/10

Phantom Abyss received "mixed or average" reviews from critics, according to the review aggregation website Metacritic. TechRadar called it "mediocre-at-best". Though they enjoyed the premise, they found the maps repetitive and frustrating. Polygon recommended it to fans of Mirror's Edge and said the gameplay is "undeniably fun" despite issues they had with the story, progression system, and user interface. Sports Illustrated praised the adrenaline-fueled gameplay and said it is "endlessly satisfying" to get through a trap-filled room unscathed. Though they enjoyed the level design and exploration, Hardcore Gamer felt that players were sometimes rushed through the rooms too fast to enjoy these aspects. It won the award for excellence in technical design at the 2023 Australian Game Developer Awards.
