= Silt (video game) =

2022 video game

- (Video-Game Cover Art of Silt)
- Developer: Spiral Circus
- Publisher: Fireshine Games
- Platforms: Microsoft Windows; Nintendo Switch; PlayStation 4 PlayStation 5 Xbox One; Xbox Series X/S
- Release: June 1, 2022
- Genres: Adventure, puzzle
- Mode: Single-player

Silt is a surreal underwater puzzle-adventure indie horror game developed by Spiral Circus and published by Fireshine Games for Microsoft Windows, Nintendo Switch, PlayStation 4, PlayStation 5, Xbox One, Xbox Series X/S, in which the player controls a deep-sea diver who can possess the diverse marine life that enters their vicinity. It was released on June 1, 2022.

== Gameplay ==
The player begins their exploration of the two-dimensional, black-and-white oceanic environment chained up for unknown reasons. From the start, they will encounter different types of fish with varying abilities which can be used to traverse levels of increasing difficulty, including piranhas which can bite through restraints, or hammerhead sharks who can smash obstacles preventing progression. Continued exploration eventually leads to uncovering more and more eerie mysteries in the ocean depths.

== Development ==
Silt is the debut game for developer Spiral Circus. The inspiration for both the art style and the oppressive, isolating atmosphere of the game came from one half of Silt’s development team, Tom Mead's own watercolour paintings of characters in vast, empty abysses. This is also the origin of the game's title. The team attended Stugan Summer Camp, a non-profit accelerator program for game developers, after which they were able to produce their first demo.

The game was announced at the PC Gaming Show at E3 2021. It is the first title published by Fireshine Games since their rebrand from Sold Out.

== Reception ==
Reception

Aggregate score
| Aggregator | Score |
|---|---|
| Metacritic | (PC) 72/100 (NS) 72/100 (PS5) 70/100 (XSX) 71/100 |

Review scores
| Publication | Score |
|---|---|
| Game Informer | 7.75/10 |
| Nintendo World Report | 8.5/10 |
| Push Square | 8/10 |
| The Guardian | 4/5 |

=== Pre-release ===
The demo received favourable reviews from several publications, including Eurogamer's Christian Donlan, who compared its haunting yet minimalistic, monochromatic art style to the caricatures of Ronald Searle. Before launch, others also noted the occasional difficulty in distinguishing between background objects and key interactive pieces of the environment.

Several outlets such as Polygon, Rock Paper Shotgun, and Screen Rant featured Silt on their lists of 2022's most anticipated horror and indie games.

=== Post-release ===
Silt received "mixed or average" reviews, according to review aggregator Metacritic.

Game Informer gave the title 7.75 out of 10 and wrote, "The impeccable graphics and thought-provoking narrative shine so brightly in this puzzle/adventure title that the game’s defects, like the frustrating lack of direction, stand out in grimy, stark contrast," while directing criticism towards its imbalanced challenges and tedious objectives. The Guardian said that the visuals, soundtrack, and atmosphere made the title "one of the most memorable releases of the year" but disliked the puzzles for having an overly simplistic design. Nintendo World Report and Push Square similarly considered the fun gameplay mechanics, incredible visuals, atmosphere, unsettling sound design, and short duration of the game to be its strengths and took minor issue with a few frustrating puzzle sequences and the stuttering.
