= Skatebird =

2021 skateboarding video game

- Developer: Glass Bottom Games
- Publisher: Glass Bottom Games
- Designer: Megan Fox
- Programmer: Megan Fox
- Artists: Sara Fox; Alexander Price
- Writer: Xalavier Nelson Jr.
- Composer: Nathan Madsen
- Engine: Unity
- Platforms: Linux; macOS; Windows; Nintendo Switch; Xbox One; Luna; PlayStation 4; PlayStation 5
- Release: Linux, macOS, Windows, Switch, Xbox One, Luna; September 16, 2021; PS4, PS5; June 1, 2023
- Genre: Sports
- Mode: Single-player

Skatebird is a skateboarding video game developed by American studio Glass Bottom Games. It was released for Microsoft Windows, macOS, Linux, Nintendo Switch, Xbox One and Amazon Luna on September 16, 2021. Versions for the PlayStation 4 and PlayStation 5 were later released in 2023.

== Gameplay ==
The game plays similarly to the Tony Hawk's Pro Skater series of video games, except for the player controlling a small bird on a skateboard instead of a human. Levels take place in a similar setting to the Micro Machines series of video games, with small-scaled "bird-sized skateparks" taking place across play areas of a house across real-life objects such as pencils, erasers, and other desktop type items. Similar to Tony Hawk's Pro Skater games, gameplay is a mixture of performing skateboard tricks, exploration, and item collection. Tricks are more simple to perform and lead to over-the-top tricks, unlike games like Skate, which focus on realism in trick performing.

== Plot ==
The game follows a small pet bird, who is saddened that their unnamed human owner no longer skateboards or is around much due to their new job that they hate. The bird takes up skateboarding as a means of getting the human's attention, and getting them back into skateboarding in efforts of making them happy again.

== Development ==
The game was first announced in November 2018. The game is being developed by indie developer Glass Bottom Games, who had previously developed the first person roguelite Spartan Fist. An early alpha build demo was released in June 2019 after the Kinda Funny E3, and a Kickstarter was launched to help funding at the same time. The game met its funding goal of $20,000 in a single day, and ended up raising over 67,000 total. The game was announced for Nintendo Switch and Xbox One platforms in December 2019, with a late 2020 release date. In July 2020, it was announced that the game's release had been delayed into 2021, not because of the COVID-19 pandemic, but because the game was simply taking longer than expected to make, partially due to the decision to include a new story mode to the game. In June 2021, it was announced that the game is scheduled to release on August 12, 2021. In July 2021, it was announced that the game would be delayed to September 16, 2021.

== Reception ==
Reception

Aggregate score
| Aggregator | Score |
|---|---|
| Metacritic | (NS) 52/100 (PC) 63/100 (XONE) 60/100 |

Review scores
| Publication | Score |
|---|---|
| Destructoid | 6/10 |
| IGN | 5/10 |
| Nintendo Life | 5/10 |
| Nintendo World Report | 5/10 |
| Shacknews | 5/10 |

Skatebird received "mixed or average" reviews, according to review aggregator Metacritic.
