= Mythic Ocean =

2020 video game

- Digital storefront artwork
- Developer: Paralune
- Publishers: Untold Tales; Nakana.io (consoles)
- Platforms: Windows; Nintendo Switch; PlayStation 4; PlayStation 5; Xbox One; Xbox Series X/S
- Mode: Single-player

Mythic Ocean is a narrative-based adventure game developed by Austin, Texas-based studio Paralune LLC and published by Untold Tales. It was released on January 9th 2020 for Steam and July 2nd 2021 for the Nintendo Switch, PlayStation 4, PlayStation 5 and Xbox One.

== Gameplay ==
Mythic Ocean revolves around exploring the old world in order to create a new world. This is done by finding various underwater gods and talking to them (which then act as a fast travel point). Each god is unique from the previous, with all of them having their own motivations and fears. The gods selected decide the ending the player will receive. The ending is decided not only by which gods are running it, but how the player character impacted them during their discussion. The control scheme is WASD for movement, with left click being used for interacting with NPCs or objects. The T key activates the previously mentioned fast travel option and Shift is used as the sprint button.

== Plot ==
After a vision of the universe ending via an apocalyptic event, the player character (an undistinguished sea-dwelling being) wakes up in a chamber with no memory of who or even what they are. An eel known as Elil states that it is all going to plan and each time the world ends, everything resets back into this place and shall start over again.

=== Gods ===
The gods themselves are Amar, a god who somewhat resembles an otter, Esti and Ketri, a set of twins who originate from a faraway place, Lutra, a newly hatched telepathic larva with an insatiable hunger and curiosity, Alethea, a scientist who staunchly believes she is living in a fabricated world and is currently trying to discover a way out of it and Gnosis, a god with amnesia who currently cannot remember much about himself.

The gods may have conflict with each other as well. For example, a possible outcome is that Lutra will grow in size significantly and eat up the kelp forest which Amar lives in. However, it is made obvious that Lutra has the mental state of a child and has no concept of the damage it is doing to Amar's environment. The options may rely on empathy towards Lutra at the cost of hurting Amar, or siding with Amar by being harsh on Lutra and preventing more destruction. There is no "correct" answer, which is a recurring situation in this game where decisions will often have to be made that do not necessarily have a best outcome.

== Reception ==
Reception

Aggregate scores
Aggregator	Score
Metacritic	71/100
OpenCritic	50% recommend

Review score
Publication	Score
RPGFan	81/100

Mythic Ocean received "generally positive" reviews according to the review aggregation website Metacritic. Dani Cross of Switch Player stated that "the dialogue is well-written and entertaining" and "there are enough twists and turns to keep you hooked through", but lightly criticized it for its brevity. Joe Parlock's stated highlight is "Every character has depth to them. Nobody’s perfect, nobody’s evil, so managing each of the gods’ foibles and flaws is more complex than it may first seem." Wildgoose noted it was like "Game of Thrones, but everyone is willing to set aside their self-interest, recognise when they’ve wronged others, and priortise [sic] the greater good." Dan Twohig of PSU seemed to enjoy Mythic Ocean, but criticized the journal page collection aspect.
