= World Bee Day =

International observance (May 20)

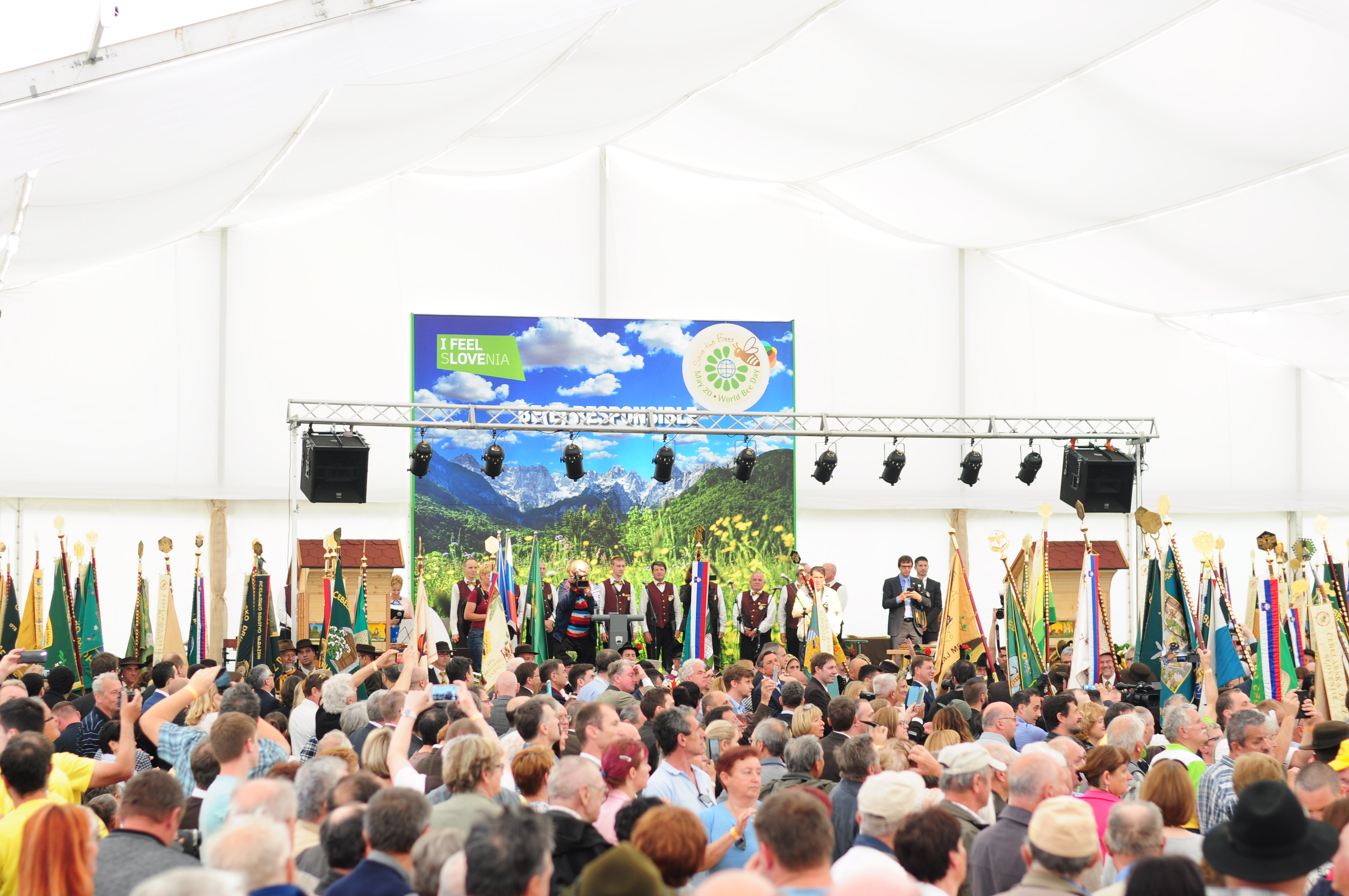
2018 World Bee Day Celebration in Breznica, Slovenia

World Bee Day is celebrated on 20 May. On this day Anton Janša, the pioneer of beekeeping, was baptized in 1734.

The purpose of the international day is to acknowledge the role of bees and other pollinators for the ecosystem.

The UN Member States approved Slovenia’s proposal to proclaim 20 May as World Bee Day in December 2017.
