= Instinction (video game) =

Upcoming video game

- Developer: Hashbane Interactive
- Publisher: Hashbane Interactive
- Engine: Unreal Engine 5
- Platforms: PlayStation 4; PlayStation 5; Windows; Xbox One; Xbox Series X/S
- Genre: Action-adventure
- Modes: Single-player, multiplayer

Instinction is an upcoming action-adventure video game developed and published by Hashbane Interactive, based in New Zealand. Inspired by the Dino Crisis game series, development began around early 2020. It was originally scheduled for release in September 2022, although additional project financing helped fund a larger development team to expand the game, with the release pushed to 2025. It will be released for PlayStation 4, PlayStation 5, Windows, Xbox One, and Xbox Series X/S.

== Gameplay ==
Instinction is an action-adventure game. Much of the game is set in the Valley of the Rift, where past and present timelines collide. Hidden within the Yucatán Peninsula, the valley is home to dinosaurs that co-exist with an ancient civilization of humans, who work to protect the area and its creatures. The player takes control of Isabel Sierra, a young Mexican-American ecologist. Isabel's grandmother, born within the peninsula, becomes terminally ill and requests that Isabel travel there to return an heirloom belonging to her indigenous people. Meanwhile, an organization descends upon the area and its inhabitants, claiming that its reason for being there is to stop a natural disaster.

In addition to single-player, the game will also include a cooperative mode for up to three players. It is played from first- and third-person perspectives. Set in an open world, the game will feature changing weather and a variety of locations, including forests, temples, and scientific research facilities. The game will initially feature more than 25 prehistoric creatures, including Smilodon, Kronosaurus, Homo floresiensis, and various dinosaurs such as Carnotaurus. Additional prehistoric creatures will be added through downloadable content, with fan suggestions being taken into consideration.

The game will include various weapons, and in addition to shooting enemies, it will also encourage exploration and puzzle-solving. Aside from main objectives, the player will also have side missions to complete, such as collecting ancient artifacts. The game will have an array of customisation options relating to weapons, player skins, and the heads-up display.

== Development and release ==
Instinction is in development by Hashbane Interactive, based in New Zealand. The company was formed by employees of the design firm Dane Design. Several employees at the firm were fans of the Dino Crisis games. As a hobby, they began working on a dinosaur video game with Unreal Engine, which the firm had been using since 2015 to design 3D buildings. A working prototype of the game was finished with a week, and the results prompted the team to pursue development of a full game through the formation of Hashbane. The game is being developed with Unreal Engine 5, and it will incorporate ray tracing and DLSS.

For years, fans had wanted Capcom to revive the Dino Crisis series or remake the original game. The series, dormant since 2003, was the primary inspiration for Instinction. It is viewed as a spiritual successor with modernized gameplay, while lacking the series' fixed camera angles. The development team was also inspired by other game series such as Turok, Tomb Raider, Metal Gear, and Uncharted, as well as the video games Trespasser (1998) and Alien: Isolation (2014). Despite these sources of inspiration, Hashbane co-founder and chief operating officer Courtney O'Neill said Instinction "is not a replacement or clone of anything".

The development team consulted with paleontologists for advice on the game's dinosaurs. O'Neill said, "While some may just be interested in a cool dinosaur game, realism is just more powerful and fulfilling, and more difficult". Some artistic license will be retained wherever it benefits the game. The team amassed a collection of bird sounds from around the world and then modified them to create the dinosaur sound effects. For the game's environments, the team conducted extensive research on climate, plant species, and different types of rocks.

After roughly a year of development, Instinction was announced in February 2021. Several trailers were unveiled later that year. Instinction was originally scheduled for release in September 2022. The project was initially self-financed. Additional funding came in early 2022, from New Zealand investment company Hillfarrance, allowing Hashbane to expand its development team and create a superior game compared to what was previously planned. All of the work prior to that point would be revamped. New members of the development team included Sanjay Singh, an artist of creature models and sculptures on the 2022 series Prehistoric Planet. Game writer Cameron Suey also joined the project.

As a result of the new funding and development work, the game's release was pushed to 2025. It will be released for PlayStation 4, PlayStation 5, Windows, Xbox One, and Xbox Series X/S. It had also been planned for Google Stadia, until Google announced it was shutting down the service. Instinction was scheduled to receive an early access release through Steam during the second half of 2023.
