= El Paso, Elsewhere =

2023 video game

- Developer: Strange Scaffold
- Publishers: Strange Scaffold; Frosty Pop (iOS)
- Director: Xalavier Nelson Jr.
- Producer: Candace Hudert
- Designer: Romero Bonickhausen
- Programmer: Romero Bonickhausen
- Artist: Filip Ugrin
- Composer: RJ Lake
- Engine: Unity
- Platforms: Windows; Xbox One; Xbox Series X/S; iOS; PlayStation 5
- Release: Windows, Xbox One, Xbox Series X/S; September 26, 2023; iOS; September 17, 2024; PlayStation 5; September 20, 2024
- Genre: Third-person shooter
- Mode: Single-player

El Paso, Elsewhere is a 2023 third-person shooter game developed and published by Strange Scaffold. Players control a vampire hunter who tries to stop his ex-girlfriend, a vampire, from destroying the world. The game is inspired by Max Payne and has retro 2000s-era graphics.

El Paso, Elsewhere released for Windows, Xbox One, and Xbox Series X/S on September 26, 2023. An iOS version was released on September 17, 2024, by Frosty Pop. A PlayStation 5 version was released on September 20, 2024. The game received generally positive reviews from critics. A sequel for the game, titled El Paso, Elsewhere 2 is set to be released for Windows and Xbox Series X and Series S in 2027.

== Gameplay ==
Players control James Savage, a narcotics-addicted vampire hunter who is tracking down his ex-girlfriend, Draculae, a vampire bent on ending the world. While fighting supernatural creatures, players rescue hostages from the motel where the vampire lives. El Paso, Elsewhere is a third-person shooter. The mechanics were inspired by the Max Payne series, the combat by Quake, and the difficulty by Hotline Miami. Like its inspirations, it uses retro-style graphics reminiscent of the early 2000s. Cinematics and monologues explain the backstory between Savage and Draculae.

== Development and release ==
Initially, players had to escort the hostages to the exit, but Strange Scaffold had trouble making this mechanic fun. During development, several other major changes were made, such as adding verticality (such as staircases), and changing how the cinematics were rendered. Changing the cinematics delayed the release substantially.

Development took about 10 months, after which Strange Scaffold almost ran out of money. The founder, Xalavier Nelson Jr., said getting further funding was difficult because investors balked at his refusal to engage in what he felt was an unhealthy work environment.

== Reception ==
Reception

Aggregate scores
Aggregator	Score
Metacritic	(PC) 78/100 (XBSX) 82/100
OpenCritic	83% recommend

Review scores
Publication	Score
Destructoid	8/10
Digital Trends	4/5
Eurogamer	4/5
GameSpot	8/10
Hardcore Gamer	4/5
TechRadar	3/5

El Paso, Elsewhere received "generally favorable" reviews from critics, according to review aggregator website Metacritic. Fellow review aggregator OpenCritic assessed that the game received strong approval, being recommended by 83% of critics.

Rock Paper Shotgun called it "a strangely sad and sweet odyssey" and said everything in the game "comes together completely flawlessly" despite seeming that they should not, a view echoed by Slant Magazine. In comparing it to the surreality of Lost Highway and Repo Man, Eurogamer said it is "both direct and gloriously weird". GameSpot wrote, "El Paso, Elsewhere combines simple yet delicately balanced action with an engrossing story about vampires, love, and the end of the world." TechRadar called El Paso, Elsewhere "creative and thoughtful" but said Savage's monologues become dreary and pointlessly edgy. Digital Trends praised the narrative, themes, and retro-style gameplay, calling it "one of the most captivating indies of the year". Though complimenting it as an excellent Max Payne homage, Hardcore Gamer said the "impressive story, surreal world and unforgettable soundtrack" make it unique.

=== Accolades ===
Year	Ceremony	Category	Result	Ref.
2024	13th New York Game Awards	Off-Broadway Award for Best Indie Game	Nominated	
2024	27th Annual D.I.C.E. Awards	Outstanding Achievement for an Independent Game	Nominated	

== Film adaptation ==
On April 22, 2024, a film adaptation of El Paso, Elsewhere was announced. It is set to be produced by Di Bonaventura Pictures, Colin Stark, with LaKeith Stanfield in talks to star and produce.
