= Black Shades =

2002 video game

- Developer: Wolfire Games
- Publisher: Wolfire Games
- Platforms: Mac OS 9, Mac OS X, Windows, Linux, iPhone, iPod Touch
- Release: 2002 (Mac OS 9); February 25, 2009 (iPhone)
- Genres: First-person shooter, stealth
- Mode: Single-player

Black Shades is a free and open-source video game developed by Wolfire Games. Originally released for Mac OS 9 it was ported to other platforms due to the source code availability. The player controls a psychic bodyguard who is tasked with protecting a VIP from a horde of zombies, snipers and other assorted would-be assassins.

== Gameplay ==
The object of Black Shades is to defend the VIP from assassins and zombies for a set amount of time. Once that time is met, the player progresses to another level. Each new level presents a randomly generated city, and a new weapon for the player. The levels get progressively more difficult. Aiming their weapon, the player is not presented with an aiming reticule as is common in most first-person shooter games, but the player is allowed to use the ironsight of their weapon.

The player has two psychic abilities, the first one being "Slow-mo". This ability allows the player to slow down time, for the purpose of having more time to aim, kill possible assailants. The second ability is the "soul fly", which allows the player to fly around the city without the body of the bodyguard, allowing them to find enemies.

== Development ==
The game's developer David Rosen (founder of Wolfire Games) aimed for Black Shades a much simpler graphical style than in GLFighters and Lugaru. He did this in order to complete the game within the deadline for the uDevGame 2002 game contest. From 2003 to 2008, the source code was hosted on icculus.org under the "uDevGame License". In 2021, David Rosen relicensed the game under the GNU General Public License version 3 or later.

== Release ==
Black Shades was released in 2002 for Mac OS 9, OS X, and Microsoft Windows. A Linux port was created by Zachary Slater. In 2009 the game was also ported to the Apple Inc. iPhone and iPod Touch. In 2013 the game was ported to the ARM-based OpenPandora handheld.

=== Mods and add-ons ===
The Black Shades Enhanced partial conversion by Michael "Bitl" Hart, offers more capabilities such as a higher framerate limit, the option to use a windowed mode, and the option to adjust the player's field-of-view.

== Reception ==
The game was noted for its use of procedural generated content. The game was one of the winners of the UDevGame 2002 contest, out of about 40 contestants. Eurogamer's Jim Rossignol named Black Shades number 2 in a top 20 list of Summer of PC Freeware games. Joe Martin from bit-tech.net recommended the game even in 2009 with "Black Shades isn't a new game, it's just a free game that I really like. It's basically the opposite of Hitman, but reduced down to twitch shooter basics and presented in a typically indie way.".
