= Ryan C. Gordon =

Computer programmer

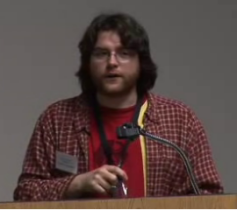
- Ryan C. Gordon giving a talk at the SouthEast LinuxFest on June 13, 2009
- Other name: icculus
- Employer: Loki Software (formerly)
- Spouse: Carrie (2010–present)
- Children: Olive Finch Gordon
- Website: Official website

Ryan C. Gordon (also known as icculus) is an American computer programmer and former Loki Software employee responsible for icculus.org, which hosts many Loki Software projects as well as others. Gordon's site hosts projects with the code from such commercial games as Duke Nukem 3D, Shadow Warrior, Quake III Arena and other free and open source projects for multiple platforms.

Gordon created ports of proprietary software products to the Linux and Mac OS X platforms. These include being hired to port most of the Unreal Tournament series, some of the Serious Sam series, the official Postal series, some Tripwire Interactive and Coffee Stain Studios titles, Prey, and Second Life. He has also been involved in porting several non-gaming products such as Google Earth. Some, such as Candy Cruncher and Postal 2, have been published by Linux Game Publishing. He was described alongside Edward Rudd as being "instrumental" in ensuring the multi-platform nature of the Humble Indie Bundle initiatives.

== Biography ==
=== Personal life ===
Gordon grew up just outside Philadelphia and attended college in Charlotte, North Carolina, where he resides. On January 3, 2010, he became engaged to Carrie and they were married later that year. On January 31, 2012, his wife gave birth to their first child, Olive Finch Gordon. He is also a founding member of the BareBones Theatre Group in Charlotte.

=== Loki Software ===
In 1999 Loki Software ran a contest called "Loki Hack" at the Atlanta Linux Showcase, with the goal of improving the Linux port of Civilization: Call To Power. Gordon decided to give it a try, driving the four-hour trip from his home to Atlanta. Loki was impressed with his work and decided to offer him a job. Gordon quickly rose to prominence at Loki, working as a developer on the game ports of Kohan: Immortal Sovereigns, Quake III Arena, and Eric's Ultimate Solitaire, as well as being the lead developer for Descent 3 and Heavy Metal: F.A.K.K.². In 2000 he also wrote several articles for the online Linux news and information website Linux.com. Around this time he founded icculus.org, made to provide hosting for various free and open source projects, and would later be used to support and continue some of Loki's free software projects and tools. While at Loki Software, Gordon picked his nickname icculus as a reference to the fictional character from Gamehendge in the song "Icculus" by Phish.

=== Independent contracts ===
The upcoming closure of Loki forced him to seek outside employment. A friend offered him a job at his cybercafe, and he was forced to move in with his parents. Desperate to escape working a cash register, he found the e-mail address of an artist working for the developer Croteam. They had recently released Serious Sam: The First Encounter, the first game in their Serious Sam series, and Gordon asked if they would be interested in him building a Linux port. They agreed, and the port's first beta was released on December 5, 2002. From there he gained other contracts such as being hired to port Devastation and Medal of Honor: Allied Assault for Linux and America's Army for Linux and Mac OS X. He was also contracted by Epic Games to port their Unreal Tournament 2003 title to Linux and Mac OS X, with the port being included with the packaged Windows version. This business relationship continued with the release of Unreal Tournament 2004, and followed from the original Unreal Tournament which was ported to Linux internally by Epic but was published by Loki.

Upon learning about the release of Postal 2 in 2003, Gordon decided to contact the developer behind it wondering if they would be interested in him making a port of the game to Linux and Mac OS X. Loki had previously ported the original Postal to Linux, and he was interested in keeping the franchise compatible. Running with Scissors agreed, and the finished port was shipped on February 14, 2005, with Linux Game Publishing initially handling the publishing of the Linux version. Soon after he was contracted to make a Linux port for the Wolfire Games title Lugaru: The Rabbit's Foot, a business relationship that would later prove fruitful for Gordon. Around this time he was also contracted to build a Linux client for the online virtual world Second Life. Google also utilized his services, with him being contracted to make a native Linux port of their Google Earth application, with Linux functionality finally becoming available starting with the release of the version 4 beta on June 12, 2006.

In 2007 he was once again contracted by Epic Games to port their new Unreal Tournament 3 title to both Linux and Mac OS X. The Linux game server was released on December 18, 2007, but work was eventually abandoned on the Linux and Mac OS X clients for reasons which remain undisclosed. In October 2008 he made the surprise announcement that he had been working on a Linux client for the first-person shooter game Prey, after previously porting the game's Linux server in 2006. Although there had been some speculation about a potential Linux release, it had been denied by the developer of the title in the past. The finished port was released on December 7, 2008.

=== FatELF, Humble Bundle, and Steam ===
On October 23, 2009, he announced plans to make a universal binary system similar to the one used on Mac OS X for Linux systems called FatELF. The project generated considerable controversy, with several Linux Kernel developers decrying the effort. Gordon announced that the project was on hold in early November 2009, later stating that he would be willing to work on it again if he receives help from an interested party.

Around this time he also started to port the game Aquaria to Linux for Bit Blot. On May 11, 2010, he and Wolfire Games released the source code of his code branch of Lugaru under the GNU General Public License. He was also involved with the source code release of Aquaria, both of which were sold as part of the first Humble Indie Bundle, which was also hosted by Wolfire. He was then contracted to port Red Orchestra: Ostfront 41–45 to Mac OS X, stating that he could potentially port it to Linux if Steam ever released a Linux client. Gordon also generated some controversy that summer for his talk at the 2010 SouthEast LinuxFest titled "Anatomy of a Failure", where he criticized some aspects of the Kernel development process. He then ported Braid to both Linux and Mac OS X to allow it to be a part of Humble Indie Bundle 2, as well as porting the games Cogs and Hammerfight for later bundles. As part of this he ported the Haaf's Game Engine to Linux and Mac OS X, and released his port under a free software license.

He ported Frozen Synapse to Linux to be included as the primary part of the Frozen Synapse Bundle, as well as Super Meat Boy and Shank for Humble Indie Bundle 4. During the rest of 2012 Gordon would work on several more ports for the Humble Bundles, including Avadon: The Black Fortress, Space Pirates and Zombies, and Psychonauts. He would also be involved in updating old releases as well as porting several new titles to Linux to be included as part of Valve's Steam Linux launch, including creating Linux ports of the games Red Orchestra: Ostfront 41–45 and Killing Floor for Tripwire Interactive. As part of the Humble Indie Bundle 7 promotion Gordon ported the title Dungeon Defenders to Linux, making it the first Linux native title to utilize Unreal Engine 3, the engine that debuted with the release of Unreal Tournament 3 back in 2007 which Gordon had unsuccessfully tried to port to the platform.

In 2013 he created an unfinished beta port of Dear Esther to Linux to be included as part of Humble Indie Bundle 8. Gordon was one of the speakers at the first ever Steam Dev Days, where he outlined how to port a game to Linux and to SteamOS. In 2014 he ported the games Goat Simulator and Sanctum 2 to Linux and Mac OS X for Coffee Stain Studios. On June 19, 2014, he released a new Linux port of LIMBO, a game that had previously been released for Linux using a CrossOver wrapper as part of Humble Indie Bundle V, something that proved controversial at the time due to it not being a fully native release. In order to accomplish this Gordon also had to port Wwise, the audio middleware that previously prevented a native port from being possible.

== icculus.org ==
icculus.org is Gordon's personal website and a project incubator similar to SourceForge.net, Ourproject.org or GNU Savannah. Gordon is often involved in the projects hosted on his site but not universally. The site hosts port or enhancement projects for games such as Aliens versus Predator, Jump 'n Bump, DONKEY.BAS, Duke Nukem 3D, Shadow Warrior, Freespace 2, Descent 2, Black Shades, Ken's Labyrinth, Rise of the Triad, Wolfenstein 3D, Heretic, Hexen, cooperative Rune, Quake II, the Build engine, Unreal (as an Unreal Tournament mod) and the Chzo Mythos. The site also hosts free software projects such as Neverball, ioquake3 and related projects, an attempted Visual Basic re-implementation, OpenAL for Mac OS X, and a Yahoo! Messenger client. It is also the host of the freeware CodeRED: Alien Arena project and has hosted code from the developers Blazing Games, Piga Software, Wolfire Games, and Bit Blot.

== Ported titles ==
The following is a list of all the software that Gordon has been involved in porting, except for his game server ports. In addition to these, he has also been contracted to provide technical assistance to Gaslamp Games, developers of Dungeons of Dredmor and Clockwork Empires, and helped develop but was not solely responsible for the Linux and OS X ports of Double Fine Productions' Costume Quest.

=== Humble Bundle ===
- Dungeon Defenders (Linux, 2012)
- Psychonauts (Linux and Mac OS X, 2012)
- Space Pirates and Zombies (Linux and Mac OS X, 2012)
- Avadon: The Black Fortress (Linux, 2012)
- Super Meat Boy (Linux and OS X, 2011)
- Shank (Linux and Mac OS X, 2011)
- Frozen Synapse (Linux, 2011)
- Cogs (Linux, 2011)
- Hammerfight (Linux and Mac OS X, 2011)
- Braid (Linux and Mac OS X, 2010)

=== Independently contracted ===
- Turok: Dinosaur Hunter (Linux, 2018)
- Goat Simulator (Linux and OS X, 2014)
- Sanctum 2 (Linux and OS X, 2014)
- Left 4 Dead 2 (Linux, 2013)
- LIMBO (OS X, 2011; Linux, 2014)
- Killing Floor (Mac OS X, 2010 and Linux, 2012)
- Red Orchestra: Ostfront 41–45 (Mac OS X, 2010 and Linux, 2012)
- Aquaria (Linux and Mac OS X, 2008–2010)
- Prey (Linux, 2008)
- Second Life (Linux, 2008)
- Google Earth (Linux, 2006)
- Lugaru: The Rabbit's Foot (Linux, 2005; OS X)
- Postal 2 (Linux and Mac OS X, 2004–2005)
- Postal (Linux and Mac OS X, 2005)
- Unreal Tournament 2004 (Linux, Mac OS X, and Win64, 2004)
- Shadow Ops: Red Mercury (Win64, 2004)
- Candy Cruncher (Linux, BeOS, and Mac OS, 2003)
- America's Army (Linux and Mac OS X, 2002–2006)
- Unreal Tournament 2003 (Linux and Mac OS X, 2002)
- Unrealty (Mac OS)

==== Mac OS X only ====
- Façade (Mac OS X, 2005)
- Shrek 2 (Mac OS X, 2004)
- Spider-Man 2 (Mac OS X, 2004)
- Feeding Frenzy (Mac OS X, 2005)
- Iggle Pop (Mac OS X)
- Pizza Frenzy (Mac OS X)
- Candy Crisis (Mac OS X)
- IMVU client (Mac OS X)
- Ricochet: Lost Worlds (Mac OS X, 2005)
- Big Kahuna Reef (Mac OS X, 2005)
- RocketBowl (Mac OS X, 2006).
- Cars: Radiator Springs Adventures (Mac OS X, 2006)
- Hidden Mysteries Civil War (Mac OS X, 2008)
- Magic Match Adventures (Mac OS X, 2008)
- Go-Go Gourmet 2 (Mac OS X)
- Go-Go Gourmet (Mac OS X, 2008)
- Super Meat Boy (Mac OS X)

=== Loki Software ===
- Kohan: Immortal Sovereigns (Linux, 2001)
- Eric's Ultimate Solitaire (Linux, 2000)
- Descent 3 (Linux, 2000)
- Heavy Metal: F.A.K.K.² (Linux, 2000)
- Quake III Arena (Linux, 1999)

=== Unfinished ports (beta) ===
- Dear Esther (Linux, 2013)
- Medal of Honor: Allied Assault (Linux)
- Devastation (Linux)
- Serious Sam: The Second Encounter (Linux)
- Serious Sam: The First Encounter (Linux)

=== Unreleased ports ===
- Unreal Tournament 3 (Linux / Mac OS X)

== See also ==
- Timothee Besset
