= Hammerfight =

2009 video game

- Steam cover art
- Developer: Konstantin Koshutin
- Publisher: Kranx Productions
- Designer: Konstantin Koshutin
- Platforms: Windows, Linux, Mac OS X
- Release: Windows: RU: September 19, 2009; WW: October 29, 2009; Linux, Mac OS X: WW: July 26, 2011
- Genre: Action
- Mode: Single-player

Hammerfight screenshot showing one of the later levels.

Hammerfight, previously known as Hammerfall, is a 2-dimensional physics-based video game published by Kranx Productions and 1C for Windows in 2009.

It was re-released as a cross-platform game in the third Humble Indie Bundle in 2011, at which time the underlying engine known as "Haaf's Game Engine" was made cross-platform and open-sourced. Another version of the game was released in 2010 for PlayStation minis and iOS under the title Age of Hammer Wars.

== Plot ==
The player is a member of a tribe called the Gaiars, a strong race who have battled with large bugs to survive. When the player's tribe is destroyed, he is taken prisoner and turned into a slave. As the player is discovered to be the last living human Gaiar, he is forced to battle in the arena. In battle, a man recognizes the player as the son of a friend, and together they plot the downfall of the Emperor who ordered the destruction of the Gaiars.

== Gameplay ==
In the physics-based gameplay, the player swings large melee weapons and relies on centripetal force to give the object enough kinetic energy to destroy enemies. The demo release had six main types of weapons - four melee and two ranged.

The different weapon types offer a certain variety. To be a slow, but well-armored powerhouse using hammers or maces to deliver slow, but crushing blows, or a nimble, but poorly protected sword-wielder, delivering quick, but weak attacks, is entirely up to the player. The game also contains a few different play modes, such as a hunt on worms or a Hammerball game.

The equipped weapon is connected to the player's hovering vehicle, and has physically realistic inertia. By moving the vehicle in circles, it is possible to swing the weapon in circles. Keeping the weapon spinning, getting it to solidly connect with foes, and avoiding their own weapons and other threats is one of the main challenges of the game. Weapon type must also be taken into consideration, with blades more effective against unarmored crafts, and heavier blunt weapons causing more damage to armor. Two weapons can be used simultaneously, and a player can experiment with different weights and types to find a pair of weapons that complement each other, or the player's play style.

== Development ==
The game was developed by Konstantin Koshutin in 2009. The game was initially released by Kranx Productions and 1C for Windows only.

== Humble Indie bundle re-release ==
In 2011 the game became part of the successful third Humble Indie Bundle.

=== Haaf's Game Engine: open-sourced ===
For the bundle, Ryan C. Gordon ported the game and the underlying game engine, Haaf's Game Engine (HGE), to Linux and Mac OS X. Following that, Relish Games and Ryan Gordon released the source code of their versions of the engine under the zlib free software license in August/September 2011.

== Reception ==
Reception

Aggregate score
Aggregator	Score
GameRankings	PC: 71%

Review score
Publication	Score
GamesRadar+	3/5
