= IndieGala =

- Type: s.r.l.
- Industry: Video games, Digital distribution
- Founded: 2011; 15 years ago
- Headquarters: Rome, Italy
- Number of employees: 20+ (April 2019)
- Website: indiegala.com

IndieGala, s.r.l. is an Italian digital storefront for video games, which grew out of its original offering of Indie Gala Bundles, a collections of games sold at a price determined by the purchaser and with a portion of the price going towards charity and the rest split between the game developers. IndieGala continues to offer these limited-time bundles, but have expanded to include a greater and more persistent storefront.

== History ==
Initial bundles were typically collections of independently developed games featuring multi-platform support (including Microsoft Windows, macOS, and Linux platforms), mainly on the Steam platform. Subsequently, the bundles became more frequent and expanded to include games from established developers, AAA publishers, games for Android-based devices, games without digital rights management (DRM), graphic design assets. IndieGala's bundles were some of the first to feature digital copies of music and comic books. Bundles are presently offered on a more regular basis, with a persistent storefront for individual game sales.

The IndieGala Bundle offerings support a number of charities, including Save The Children, Child's Play, AbleGamers Foundation, Italian Red Cross charities, most notably supporting the efforts in the Emilia Romagna region of Italy that was affected by a series of earthquakes. The success of the Humble Bundle approach is what inspired IndieGala and a number of similar efforts to offer "pay what you want" bundles, including Indie Royale and Fanatical (formerly Bundle Stars).

The IndieGala operation has since grown to include a dedicated storefront, a Steam-like client similar to GOG's Galaxy or Desura's client, a publishing and development arm, as well as a fund to support indie games and indie developers.

As a corporation, IndieGala is headquartered in Rome, Italy, with about 25 employees. Its co-founder and CEO is Riccardo Rosapepe.

IndieGala's online debut and their first bundle named "The Indie Gala" was released on December 5, 2011, and sold over 20,000 copies.

IndieGala's first published game was officially released on Steam on May 21, 2015, and it sold over 40,000 copies globally.

IndieGala's first developed game was released in Early Access on Steam on 20 December 2017.

In March 2022 IndieGala announced the development of a new open-world horror game.

== Games developed ==
Year	Title	Genre	PC	8th Gen	9th Gen
TBA	Vorax	Action / Horror / Survival	Windows	N/A	N/A
2019	Die Young: Prologue	Action / Adventure / Survival	Windows	N/A	N/A
2019	Die Young	Action / Adventure / Survival	Windows	PS4	PS5
2018	Stayin' Alive	Action	Windows	N/A	N/A

== Games published ==
Year	Title	Developer	Genre(s)	Platform
2015	Blockstorm	GhostShark	Action / FPS	Microsoft Windows, Linux, OS X
2016	Tyler	ILLUSIONETWORK	Action / Casual	Microsoft Windows
2016	Red Rope: Don't Fall Behind	Yonder	Action / Adventure / Cooperative	Microsoft Windows, Linux, OS X
2017	Downward	Caracal Games	Adventure / Platform	Microsoft Windows, Linux
2018	Gates Of Nowhere	Symmetrical	Action / Adventure / VR	Microsoft Windows
2020	Exit Limbo: Opening	Virtual Craft Studio	Action / Adventure / Brawler	Microsoft Windows

== Controversy and criticism ==
In 2013, an Indie Gala bundle had a part of its proceeds going towards the political election campaign of a candidate in Vancouver.

In 2017, in an attempt to mitigate piracy, IndieGala gave away one of their Unreal Engine titles, Die Young, which at that point of time was still in Early Access.

In 2017, due to a checkout issue involving G2A in the IndieGala system, customers were unknowingly subscribed to subscription trial. The company apologized and the affected customers were compensated.

In 2017, customers who purchased Castle of Illusion from IndieGala – together with other retailers, such as Green Man Gaming and GamesPlanet – were affected by a series of key deactivations. The issue apparently stemmed from a technical mishap when the publishing agreement between SEGA and Disney came to an end. The situation, however, was later resolved.

== See also ==
- Pay what you want
- Humble Bundle
- Indie Royale
- itch.io
- Desura
- Steam
