= Gaslamp Games =

Canadian video game developer

Gaslamp Games, Inc.
- Type: Private
- Industry: Video games
- Founded: 27 January 2010
- Defunct: 2017
- Headquarters: Victoria, British Columbia, Canada
- Key people: David Baumgart (Co-Founder); Dan Jacobsen (Co-Founder); Nicholas Vining (Co-Founder)
- Website: gaslampgames.com

Gaslamp Games, Inc. was an independent game developer based in Victoria, British Columbia, Canada which designed video games for the Microsoft Windows, Mac OS X, and Linux operating systems. Their first game, Dungeons of Dredmor, was released in 2011. Their most recent game, Clockwork Empires, was released in 2016. While the company did not appear to announce it was no longer operating, employees posted on social media that they no longer worked there after the Christmas holiday in 2016. There have also been no social media posts by the company and no further developments to their games after that time. In May 2019 they confirmed that the company had ceased all operations and officially removed Clockwork Empires from sale on all platforms.

== Staff ==
Nicholas Vining, Gaslamp's technical director, has been involved in the game industry since the age of sixteen, when he got his Linux gaming start working for Loki Software. Since then, he has contributed to games developed by Piranha Games, 3000AD Inc., Destineer Studios, and TimeGate Studios. He has also written for Game Developer Magazine, and is listed as a contributor to the OpenGL Rendering API specification. He has also worked with prolific coder Ryan C. Gordon on various open source and Linux-related projects.

David Baumgart, Gaslamp's art director, has previously worked as a contractor specialising in 2-D artwork for video games. His list of credited titles includes work for Niels Bauer Games, Hexwar Games, Data Spire, and Tactic Studios. He also created the logo for the FatELF project.

Daniel Jacobsen, Gaslamp's CEO, co-founded the company while working on his undergraduate degree in physics at the University of Victoria, and their first release, Dungeons of Dredmor, was his first commercial video game project. In addition to programming and company management, he has also lectured with Nicholas Vining at the University of Victoria on game design, and contributes actively to Australian National University's SkyMapper project.

== Releases ==
Their first project, Dungeons of Dredmor, was released on July 13, 2011. Dungeons of Dredmor is a Rogue-inspired dungeon crawler which embraces procedural content generation. Gaslamp's second game, Clockwork Empires, a steampunk city-building game, was released on Steam Early Access on August 15, 2014. Version 1.0 of Clockwork Empires launched on October 26, 2016.
