= A Story About My Uncle =

2012 video game

- Developer: Gone North Games
- Publisher: Coffee Stain Studios
- Designer: Sebastian Zethraeus
- Programmer: Sebastian Eriksson
- Engine: Unreal Engine 3
- Platforms: Windows, Linux, macOS
- Release: Windows; 28 May 2014; Linux, macOS; 12 May 2017
- Genre: Adventure
- Mode: Single-player

A Story About My Uncle is an adventure game by independent developer Gone North Games and published by Coffee Stain Studios in 2014. It was initially developed by students of Södertörn University in 2012, with a full release in May 2014 for Microsoft Windows, and three years later for macOS and Linux. The game was re-developed professionally after collaboration with Coffee Stain Studios.

A Story About My Uncle is played from a first-person perspective, and the player travels by using floating rocks. According to review aggregator Metacritic, the game received mixed reviews. It was nominated for the Game of the Year award at the 2012 Swedish Game Awards.

== Gameplay ==
A Story About My Uncle is a first-person platforming game that emphasizes exploration and traversal. The player controls a young boy wearing a prototype adventure suit created by his missing uncle, Fred. The suit allows the character to move across large gaps using a grappling hook, and includes shock-absorbing boots that prevent damage from long falls.

Gameplay involves navigating environments made up of floating islands and cavernous landscapes. The grappling hook can be used to latch onto specific surfaces mid-air, allowing the player to swing across distances and maintain momentum. In a later section of the game, the character receives jet-propelled boots that enhance the suit's mobility and enable longer jumps. There are no combat elements, and the game does not feature a failure state such as losing lives or restarting levels. Instead, the focus is on precise platforming, timing, and environmental storytelling.

== Plot ==
The game’s narrative is presented as a bedtime story told by an adult to his daughter, recounting an imaginative adventure he experienced as a child. The story begins when the protagonist, a young boy, enters the home of his uncle Fred, a scientist and explorer. Inside Fred’s observatory, he discovers a launch pad that transports him to a mysterious world of floating islands, glowing crystals, and intelligent amphibian-like creatures.

While exploring this world, the protagonist meets Maddie, a young inhabitant who feels disconnected from her community. She joins the protagonist on his journey, and together they travel through the caverns in search of Fred. Eventually, they arrive at the sky city of Star Haven, inhabited by a group of outcast creatures known as the Strays. There, Maddie decides to stay behind, asking the protagonist to tell Fred to visit her. In Star Haven, the protagonist also upgrades his suit with jet-propelling boots that improve his jumping capabilities.

The journey leads to the Ice Cave, where the protagonist finds Uncle Fred. Fred explains that he created the frog-like species using modified eggs and that the crystals in the environment serve as their power source. Although he is happy to see his nephew, Fred decides to remain in the world he helped create, sending the protagonist home using the launch pad.

In the final scene, the adult narrator returns to Fred's observatory. He leaves behind a letter addressed to Fred, expressing gratitude for the experiences that shaped his life.

== Development ==
The initial ideas for developing the game were "basically playing with gravity in the world – you would turn it upside down" according to Sebastian Eriksson, co-founder of Gone North Games and one of the company's programmers. Eriksson "had been playing around with a mechanic to propel yourself within this gravity-bending game"; this ended up being the main mechanic, and the game was built around it. The students who developed A Story About My Uncle had "to teach themselves how to use game development software" Unreal Engine because they did not have much experience in the video game field.

The game was developed over three months in 2012, in the Unreal Engine Unreal Development Kit, by a small group of students at Södertörn University. Being developed for a competition, university students were tasked to build a "non-violent first-person game in the Unreal Engine". The Södertörn students formed their own video game studio called Gone North Games. According to Sebastian Zethraeus, they learned how to use the engine in ten weeks and built a prototype in that time. He said they "were proud of it at the time, but our eyes bleed now when we look at it".

A Story About My Uncle was first released on 30 July 2012 as a free demo; the demo was nominated for Game of the Year at Swedish Game Awards. Developers Gone North Games then partnered with Coffee Stain Studios to publish the game on 28 May 2014, on Steam, professionally redeveloping it in collaboration with Coffee Stain Studios. The game was released on 28 May 2014 for Microsoft Windows, and on 12 May 2017 for macOS and Linux.

Gone North Games' student developers, together with Coffee Stain Studios, polished the game by "remaking everything from the meshes to the voice acting to the code itself". Sebastian Eriksson said that being nominated for Game of the Year, and getting feedback from early players, led the group to finish the game.

== Reception ==
Reception

Aggregate score
Aggregator	Score
Metacritic	73/100

Review scores
Publication	Score
Game Informer	7.75/10
Hardcore Gamer	4/5
PC Gamer (US)	78/100

A Story About My Uncle received "mixed or average" reviews, according to review aggregator Metacritic. As of December 2019 the game scored a "Very Positive" review by over 10,150 reviews on Steam.

Stephen Dunne of GodisaGeek wrote "Some [players] may find A Story About My Uncle too easy, some people may find it infuriating", but that "most, however, will be engrossed in its ever-glowing and charismatic fantasy world". Ben Griffin of PC Gamer wrote that the game "is fast, fluid and fun". Cassidee Moser of CGMagazine praised the game for being "well-crafted and paced", adding that the "environments are varied and beautifully done" and the "story itself is a light-hearted, innocent magical romp".

Kyle Hilliard of Game Informer also found the game to be light-hearted, but did suggest that this is "at odds with the difficulty late in-game", and so confusing who the game is aimed at.

In 2012, A Story About My Uncle received a nomination for Game of the Year at the Swedish Game Awards.
