= The Westport Independent =

2016 video game

- Developer: Double Zero One Zero
- Publisher: Coffee Stain Studios
- Designer: Pontus Lundén
- Programmer: Kristian Brodal
- Artists: Pontus Lundén; Gustav Rangmar
- Writers: Pontus Lundén; Chris Albin
- Composer: Pontus Lundén
- Platforms: Android; iOS; Linux; Windows; OS X
- Release: WW: 21 January 2016
- Genre: Simulation
- Mode: Single-player

The Westport Independent is a simulation video game developed by Double Zero One Zero and published by Coffee Stain Studios. The game was released digitally for Android, iOS, Linux, Microsoft Windows, and OS X on 21 January 2016.

== Gameplay ==
The Game is set in a backsliding city-state named Westport amid a crisis regarding Parliament's attempts to censor the media. The player (the editor and owner of the titular "Westport Independent") will have to choose what the newspaper will publish and what it will not. All decisions will have a major impact throughout the course of the game. The player will also need to confront the writers working for the newspaper, who will want different content to be published. Articles will include subjects such as riots, healthcare, industrial accidents and rebellions.

== Development ==
Originally, the game was developed over a period of 72 hours. This version was featured on several websites. Eventually, the developers decided to expand it into a full length game with many more features. While it is essentially a more fully featured (though otherwise unrelated) version of Lucas Pope's The Republia Times (the Ludum Dare precursor to Papers, Please), the developers have stated they were unaware of Pope's game until after they had finished the game-jam version of this one.

== Reception ==
Reception

Aggregate score
Aggregator	Score
Metacritic	(PC) 63/100 (iOS) 75/100

Review scores
Publication	Score
PC Gamer (US)	67/100
The Escapist	3.5/5

The Westport Independent received mixed reviews. The game holds an aggregated Metacritic score of 63/100 for Microsoft Windows, based on 15 critic reviews, and one of 75/100 for iOS, based on 6 critic reviews. PC Gamer reviewer Matt Elliott gave the game a score of 65/100, stating that "[a] cleanly executed idea falls short because of flat characterisation and a dissatisfying lack of consequence. If only real papers were this toothless." Nick Monroe from The Escapist awarded it 3.5 out of 5 stars, saying that "[the game] is a great choice for fans of Papers, Please, and anyone who wants a game that makes you critically think about real-life topics."
