= Songs of Conquest =

2024 video game

- Developer: Lavapotion
- Publisher: Coffee Stain Publishing
- Producer: Magnus Alm
- Designer: Carl Toftfelt
- Programmers: Patrik Liljecrantz, Niklas Borglund
- Artist: Anders Gullmarsvik
- Writer: Kim Tough
- Engine: Unity
- Platforms: Windows; MacOS; PlayStation 5; Xbox Series X/S; Android; iOS; Nintendo Switch; Nintendo Switch 2
- Release: Microsoft Windows, MacOS; May 20, 2024; PlayStation 5, Xbox Series X/S; November 12, 2024; Android, iOS; March 13, 2025; Nintendo Switch, Nintendo Switch 2 June 17, 2025
- Genre: Turn-based strategy
- Modes: Single-player, multiplayer

Songs of Conquest is a turn-based strategy game developed by Lavapotion and published by Coffee Stain Publishing. Inspired by 90s classics such as Heroes of Might and Magic III, the game was released in early access on May 10, 2022 for Microsoft Windows and macOS. It allows players to choose from four unique factions, expand their kingdoms, and wage battle by controlling powerful magicians called Wielders. The game was released out of early access on May 20, 2024. The PlayStation 5 and Xbox Series X/S port released on November 12, 2024, and Android and iOS port released on March 13, 2025. The Nintendo Switch port released on June 17 2025.

== Gameplay ==
In-engine screenshot of a player's town for the faction of Arleon

The game can be described as a turn-based strategy-adventure hybrid. The strategy part of the game involves kingdom management, such as recruiting Wielders and units, constructing and improving buildings, as well as turn-based combat skirmishes. The adventure part is supported by the unique fantasy setting and story, presented through a combination of 2D pixel art style, 3D environments, and volumetric lighting.

== Development ==
From 2019 to May 2021, Swedish development team Lavapotion had reached over 20,000 requests to sign up for Songs of Conquest's closed alpha. The team has kept a direct line of communication with the public through their Discord server, complementing it with updates on their official website's blog posts. The game's release was originally planned for late 2020 but, likely due to the consequences of the COVID-19 pandemic, the launch target was postponed to May 10, 2022. The game released in early access on Steam, GOG.com, and Epic Games Store. Its first DLC, named Vanir, was released on 17 December 2024. Its second DLC, Roots, was released on 17 June 2025. The third DLC, Rise Eternal was released on 5 March 2026. And the fourth, and latest DLC, Yulan, was released on 4 June 2026.

== Reception ==
Reception

Aggregate score
Aggregator	Score
Metacritic	78/100

Review score
Publication	Score
Eurogamer	3/5

Songs of Conquest was awarded the title of "Most Anticipated" in the "PC Gaming Show Presentation" during E3 2021. Upon release, it received positive reviews on Metacritic and was among the top three best-selling games that were released in 2022 at GOG.com. By October 2026, the game had sold more than 800,000 copies on Steam alone.
