= Dungeons of Dredmor =

2011 video game

- Developer: Gaslamp Games
- Programmers: Nicholas Vining; Daniel Jacobsen; Ryan C. Gordon
- Artist: David Baumgart
- Composer: Matthew Steele
- Platforms: Microsoft Windows, OS X, Linux
- Release: Microsoft Windows, OS X July 13, 2011; Linux; October 13, 2011
- Genre: Roguelike
- Mode: Single-player

Dungeons of Dredmor is a roguelike indie video game released on July 13, 2011, by Gaslamp Games. A downloadable content (DLC) pack, "Realm of the Diggle Gods", was released later that year. A second DLC, "You Have To Name The Expansion Pack", was released on June 5, 2012, and a third, "Conquest of the Wizardlands", was released on August 1, 2012. The game has extensive support for user-created modifications.

== Gameplay ==
Stat and damage types

The game starts as the player assumes the role of the game's main character entering a hostile dungeon crawler environment. The player enters the dungeon at the top floor and gradually progresses down through levels of increasing difficulty. Each level is a randomly generated maze of interconnected rooms, filled with monsters, traps, loot, and various other objects. The game world is laid out in a tile-based square grid viewed from a top-down perspective, where the player, enemies, and various items and objects occupy discrete squares. The game is turn-based, and both the player and numerous enemies take turns performing actions. Each turn the player may move to or attack monsters in adjacent squares; pick up, drop, and use items; and interact with various in-game objects.

As in most role-playing games, the player has several character statistics that determine their effectiveness in various aspects of gameplay. The player begins the game with seven chosen skills, which may be further improved as the player gains experience levels. The combat focuses on melee, ranged, and magic attacks, as well as use of items and skills. Weapons and equipment can be worn to improve the player's defences and abilities. The player carries an inventory of items, which can include various foods, drinks, potions, crafting materials, etc. Dungeons of Dredmor's in-game currency is zorkmids, a reference to the 1980 game Zork. Shops are also featured on every floor, where players may buy and sell equipment and consumables; however, stealing from a shop will result in the player being attacked by many powerful enemies.

The objective of the game is ostensibly to find and slay the eponymous Lord Dredmor, the ruler of the dungeons. However, doing so is difficult, and per the developers' own admittance, the objective is more often to see how far one can get before dying, and then try again. The game features three levels of difficulty – Elvishly Easy, Dwarven Moderation, and Going Rogue, equivalent to Easy, Normal, and Hard, respectively. An option called "No Time To Grind?" can also be selected, which generates smaller floors for the player to explore, but offers the same amount of experience as normal levels. Character permadeath may be enabled or disabled during character creation.

Artifacts are powerful weapons and armor that have a randomly generated name and extra attributes compared to standard gear. Artifacts have the same appearance as normal gear but have bonus stats alongside the existing stats of the gear, i.e a Wooden Sword does two points of Crushing damage, but an artifact version may have additional added damage types as well. The player may obtain artifacts by discovering them in the dungeon, from the Lutefisk God, creating them using an Anvil of Krong, or as a reward from quests. Quests can be accepted from Statues of Inconsequentia, which assign the player the task of defeating a squad of monsters, retrieving an artifact, or delivering a retrieved artifact to a specific location in the dungeon. Lutefisk is frequently referenced in Dungeons of Dredmor, where lutefisk is a consumable item, and flavor text frequently mocks it and refers to it as being "inedible". Lutefisk may be sacrificed to the Lutefisk God, which may reward the player with artifacts.

== Development ==
In an interview with RPGWatch, game artist David Baumgart explained that the game is based on an "immature build of a humorous roguelike game" which the game's programmer Nicholas Vining had been working on since 2006. He also noted that the game's art sets the game apart from traditional roguelikes that feature ASCII graphics.

== Reception ==
Reception

Aggregate scores
Aggregator	Score
GameRankings	79.00%
Metacritic	79/100

Review scores
Publication	Score
GamePro	4/5
GamesRadar+	7/10
IGN	8.5/10

Award
Publication	Award
PC Gamer US	Indie Game of the Year

Critics have generally given Dungeons of Dredmor positive reviews; as of June 6, 2012, it holds a 79/100 score at Metacritic and 79.00% at GameRankings.

Alec Meer of Rock Paper Shotgun noted how the game's complexity and heavy reliance on the random aspect makes it unbalanced and unpredictable. He noted that careful strategy has to be employed, and closed by stating that Dungeons of Dredmor is "genuinely, a fantastic game", albeit with minor interface issues. Jordan Baughman of GamesRadar called it a "competent roguelike" and pointed out that it requires careful strategy. He noted that its humor sets it apart from other roguelikes, but criticized its inventory management system. Adam Biessener of Game Informer called the game a "fun, accessible, lighthearted dungeon crawl". He noted that the game does not innovate outside the bounds of the genre, but manages to excel at certain aspects. He also remarked on the game's humor and level of detail.

Nathan Meunier of IGN called Dungeons of Dredmor challenging, but noted it is easy to get into with adjusted difficulty settings. He also praised its humor and replayability. Jason Wilson of GamePro praised the simple starting setup and called the combat "simple yet deep". While he saw the difficulty as a good feature, he also commented on balance issues. Josh McIllwain of Ars Technica noted that the game's "wicked sense of humor" sets it apart from other roguelike games. He also pointed out the difficulty and called it "brutal and unforgiving".

PC Gamer US chose Dungeons of Dredmor as their "Indie Game of the Year" for 2011.

== See also ==
- List of roguelikes
