= Overgrowth (video game) =

- Developer: Wolfire Games
- Publisher: Wolfire Games
- Designer: David Rosen
- Artist: Aubrey Serr
- Composers: Mikko Tarmia; Anton Riehl
- Platforms: Windows, macOS, Linux
- Release: WW: October 16, 2017
- Genre: Action
- Modes: Single-player, multiplayer

Overgrowth is an action video game released by Wolfire Games available for Microsoft Windows, macOS and Linux. It was announced on September 17, 2008, and released on October 16, 2017, after 9 years of development and early access.

Overgrowth is the sequel to Lugaru, a 3D action game from the same company. The player character is Turner, an anthropomorphic rabbit with combat skills. The game plays as a 3D third-person action game, set in a pre-industrial world of anthropomorphic fighter rabbits, wolves, dogs, cats and rats. The game is designed by David Rosen.

== Plot ==
Overgrowth's story takes place several years after the events of Lugaru and follows the same protagonist: Turner. After avenging the murder of his family, killing the Alpha wolf, and killing the corrupt king Hickory, Turner refused to take Hickory's place on the throne, instead choosing to leave the monarchy headless and wander the island in search of some new purpose.

The game takes place on the island of Lugaru, an unknown number of years after the fall of the human race, indicated by the ruins of tall man-made structures overrun by vegetation. Lugaru is a chaotic world, inhabited by anthropomorphic rabbits, wolves, rats, cats and dogs living at a pre-industrial level of technology.

== Gameplay ==
Overgrowth is built on the gameplay of its predecessor, Lugaru, and as such uses a hand-to-hand combat system that bases attacks and counters on timing and context using context-sensitive action buttons rather than different key combinations.

== Development ==
Since November 25, 2008, Wolfire Games has released new Alpha tests every 2–5 months, containing most of the features so far implemented in the game. These are available to people who have pre-ordered the game. Overgrowth was released December 17, 2013, as an Early Access title on Steam. On January 18, 2017, the game was officially updated to beta status. The game reached 1.0 and was released on October 16, 2017, which had been revealed as the release date a week earlier. On April 21, 2022, the source code of Overgrowth was made open-source, being licensed under the Apache License version 2.0.

Parts of the game are scripted with AngelScript. The level editor is included with the game. The game supports free or inexpensive mod tools such as Blender.
