= Goat Simulator 3 =

2022 video game

- Developer: Coffee Stain North
- Publisher: Coffee Stain Publishing
- Director: Santiago Ferrero
- Producers: Sebastian Zethraeus; Judith Radnitz; Daniel Kaplan
- Designers: Santiago Ferrero; Victor Frydebo
- Programmer: Philip Lindau
- Artists: William Birgersson; Elin Hamberg
- Composer: Stuart Docherty
- Series: Goat Simulator
- Engine: Unreal Engine 4
- Platforms: Windows; PlayStation 4; PlayStation 5; Xbox One; Xbox Series X/S; iOS; Android; Nintendo Switch; Nintendo Switch 2
- Release: PlayStation 5, Windows, Xbox Series X/S; November 17, 2022; Android, iOS; December 5, 2023; Nintendo Switch; August 27, 2024; PlayStation 4, Xbox One; October 24, 2024; Nintendo Switch 2; April 1, 2026
- Genres: Action, simulation
- Modes: Single-player, multiplayer

Goat Simulator 3 is an action video game and the sequel to Goat Simulator. The game is suffixed with a '3' rather than a '2' as a joke by the developers; "Goat Simulator 2" does not exist. The game was announced by Coffee Stain Studios during Summer Game Fest and was released on November 17, 2022. The game features a four-player cooperative mode, and it is set on the fictional island of San-Angora.

Mobile ports for Android and iOS were released on December 5, 2023. The Nintendo Switch version of the game was released on August 27, 2024, during the Nintendo Direct partner showcase, almost two years after its initial release date. Ports for PlayStation 4 and Xbox One were released on October 24, 2024. A version for the Nintendo Switch 2 was released on April 1, 2026.

== Gameplay ==
Goat Simulator 3, like its predecessor, is an action game played in a third-person perspective where the goal, controlling the goat player character named Pilgor, is to wreak havoc and perform stunts in the game's urban environment. A mechanic of the previous game where the playable goat can hitch itself to items and objects found in the world by licking them is retained in this game. The developers claim that its open world is 18 times larger than that of the first game. Additionally, sections exist where different gameplay styles are explored, such as a parody of Wolfenstein 3D with first-person shooter mechanics. A story mode, new to the series, also appears in Goat Simulator 3, where players would have to complete quests to ascend the illuminati ranks and unlock the goat castle door, which leads to a final boss battle against the farmer. Also new to the series is the introduction to the wardrobe, which allows the player to customize their character further. Some of these clothing items are purely for looks, whereas others have special abilities.

A four-player cooperative online multiplayer mode was also added with the ability to play 7 competitive PvP minigames at any time and anywhere during gameplay in the online multiplayer mode and include games such as The floor is lava, an association football-like mini-game titled Hoofball, and a Splatoon-like mini-game called Headsplat.

The game has numerous hidden secrets that reference other games and pop culture.

Players are also given their own customizable hub world known as the Goat Castle that is upgraded by completing goals and achievements in the other worlds.

== Development ==
Goat Simulator 3 was developed by Coffee Stain North, a subsidiary of Coffee Stain that had previously worked on the GoatZ and Waste of Space DLC for Goat Simulator (as Gone North Games).

=== Release and promotion ===
Goat Simulator 3 was released on 17 November, 2022. The official reveal trailer for Goat Simulator 3 is a loose parody of the Dead Island 2 reveal trailer, featuring a man jogging and listening to music while chaos unfolds behind him, unnoticed. Those who bought the game on the Epic Games Store received free access to a Fortnite skin based on Pilgor, which was also available for purchase in-game for 1,200 V-Bucks. Goat Simulator 3 was released with several special editions. The "Pre‑Udder Edition" included an udder cosmetic item and the Digital Downgrade DLC, which featured cosmetic items inspired by the original Goat Simulator and its DLCs. The "Goat In a Box" edition contained the same content, along with a steelbook case for the game, a double-sided poster, postcards, a digital and physical copy of the soundtrack, and a Pilgor plush. The Digital Downgrade DLC was later made available separately for players who didn't preorder the game.

A paid-content expansion titled "Multiverse of Nonsense" was released on 19 June 2024. The expansion spoofs the concept of the multiverse, with a new map full of alternate universe worlds, including one inspired by Toontown. Another expansion, "Baadlands: Furry Road", released on 19 November 2025, spoofs post-apocalyptic media such as Borderlands and Mad Max. A third expansion, "Ticket to Dizzyworld," will be released on 19 November 2026, taking place in an amusement park. On 25 November 2024, the first gear pack was released, titled "Hocus Pocus Pack," adding 20 new cosmetic outfits and items inspired by the fantasy genre. The "Super Duper Pack," released on 12 December 2024, added superhero-themed items, while the "Buck to the Future Pack," released on 1 April 2026, added sci-fi-themed items.

Ports for iOS and Android were released in December 2023. Following initial exclusivity on the Epic Games Store, the PC version was released on Steam in January 2024. A Nintendo Switch version was released on 27 August 2024, the same day as its announcement in a Nintendo Direct Partner Showcase. Ports for Xbox One and PlayStation 4 were released on 8 Oct 2024. A port for the Nintendo Switch 2 was released on 1 April 2026. A special edition for the PlayStation 5, titled the Goat Overload Edition, was released on June 25, 2026. The edition comes bundled with both expansions, as well as the Digital Downgrade, Hocus Pocus Pack, and Super Duper Pack DLC. The Digital Downgrade pack is the only DLC available for the Nintendo Switch version, and Multiverse of Nonsense is the only expansion released for the mobile version. Similar to the original Goat Simulator, Multiverse of Nonsense is a separate app for iOS and Android.

In a cross-promotional event with the board game Catan in 2023, a free April Fools' update added a sheep avatar, while the console version of Catan featured Pilgor on the game's board, only on April 1. A limited set of Goat Simulator-themed Catan cards were also produced and given away as part of a sweepstakes promotion.

== Reception ==
Reception

Aggregate scores
Aggregator	Score
Metacritic	PC: 71/100; PS5: 68/100; XBSX: 78/100
OpenCritic	49% recommend

Review scores
Publication	Score
GamesRadar+	2.5/5
IGN	8/10
PC Gamer (US)	50/100
Push Square	6/10
Shacknews	7/10
VG247	4/5

According to review aggregator website Metacritic, Goat Simulator 3 received "mixed or average reviews" for the PC and PlayStation 5 versions, while the Xbox Series X version received "generally favorable reviews". Fellow review aggregator OpenCritic assessed that the game received fair approval, being recommended by 49% of critics.

IGN has rated the game a score of 8. “Goat Simulator 3 is bigger, sillier, and packed with more low-stakes fun.” Alex Avard of GamesRadar+ praised the game's physics-based gameplay and customization options, but criticized its shallow mission structure, technical bugs, and reliance on repetitive humor. Avard described the game as an ambitious expansion of the original, although he felt that its comedic appeal became less engaging over time.

Ted Litchfield of PC Gamer also criticized the game's repetitive side quests and open-world objectives. He noted that some missions contained humorous surprises, but argued that the repetitive structure made the experience less engaging over longer periods.
