= Huntdown =

2020 video game

- Promotional cover art
- Developer: Easy Trigger
- Publisher: Coffee Stain Publishing
- Director: Tommy Gustafsson
- Designer: Tommy Gustafsson
- Programmers: Andreas Rehnberg; Svante Almbring
- Artists: Tommy Gustafsson; Marcus Jerner
- Writers: Tommy Gustafsson; Adrian Comeau; Corey Marshall
- Composer: Tommy Gustafsson
- Engine: Unity
- Platforms: Microsoft Windows, PlayStation 4, Xbox One, Nintendo Switch, macOS, Android, iOS, tvOS
- Release: May 12, 2020
- Genre: Run and gun
- Modes: Single-player, multiplayer

Huntdown is a 2020 run-and-gun video game developed by Easy Trigger and published by Coffee Stain Publishing. It was released for Microsoft Windows, macOS, PlayStation 4, Xbox One and Nintendo Switch in May 2020. The game was later ported to Android and iOS in May 2021.

== Gameplay ==
The player-character can choose between one of three characters: Anna Conda (a human mercenary), John Sawyer (a 148 year-old cyborg) and Mow Man (an android). The player must the guide the chosen character across straight levels where the player will encounter enemies that serve as obstacles to the player that must reach the end of the level. Across some levels, suitcases known as 'Stashes' can be found and collected, which influence the final score. Some can be found in specific areas while others will be carried by enemy couriers that must be pursued and eliminated before they can escape.

Enemies encountered utilize all sorts of weaponry, including improvised ones such as hockey sticks, baseball bats and motorcycles, all of which deal damage to the player. Several enemies, when they fall, can drop these weapons which the player can pick up as secondary weaponry, although with limited ammunition in contrast to their primary one. This also applies to throwing objects such as hand grenades and molotov cocktails, which are limited in contrast to the player's primary throwing weapons (a tomahawk axe for Anna Conda, a boomerang for John Sawyer and throwing knives for Mow Man). The player can take damage and will die if their health bar is empty, which can be healed by passing through determined checkpoints at the level or picking up medicine in the form of medical kits or painkiller bottles. The player can also fall in specific pitfalls and die as well. While the player can die and return almost infinitely, not dying ever on a level also counts towards the final score.

All levels culminate in an encounter with a boss, depicted as a bounty, at the end of the level, which the player must defeat to finish the level. Several bosses are typically divided in two levels (armored and unarmored), which the armored health bar (colored silver) must be depleted before the player can actually cause damage. This also applies to some enemies throughout the levels.

== Story ==
=== Setting ===
Huntdown is set in the future, following a third world war that caused the collapse of Earth's nations and their replacement by corporations, building "a society fueled by greed". Given the corporations only provide jobs and protection to those loyal, the lack of public services also created a high rate of crime, with street gangs, cartels and syndicates waging constant war against each other and corporate authority. This provides an ideal, stable ground for bounty hunters who can get hired by the corporations to dispatch of specific targets.

=== Plot ===
The player's bounty hunter is offered a millionaire contract by the elderly Wolfmother of the Shimamoto Corporation - who also was a foster mother to the bounty hunter - to initiate a huntdown of several criminal elements which head four specific street gangs - the Hoodlum Dolls (a feral punk-themed street gang), the Misconducts (a hooligan gang that utilizes hockey uniforms for armor), the Heatseekers (a smuggling greaser motorcycle gang with a style of an Ancient Rome centurions) and the recently formed Nº1 Suspects (a syndicate with a stylized Japanese theme and high-tech equipment). The bounty hunter, while hunting down the gang leaders, also comes across opportunity "bounties" that serve as enforcers and lieutenants for the gangs, eliminating them as well.

However, after defeating the final gang leader, the Shogun of the Nº1 Suspects, the hunter is contacted by the Wolfmother, who is surprised to see the bounty hunter accomplished the huntdown, on which the hunter was not expected to survive. The Wolfmother explains that Shimamoto had a transition in its leadership and the huntdown was formed to destroy the gangs and take over their territories, while the bounty hunter would die as to erase all of Shimamoto's involvement in the conflicts. Because the hunter survived, the Wolfmother is forced to terminate the contract and put a bounty on the hunter's head. However, a bounty is also placed on Wolfmother, on which an unseen bounty hunter eliminates both the guards and finally kills the Wolfmother herself.

== Reception ==
Reception

Aggregate scores
| Aggregator | Score |
|---|---|
| Metacritic | NS: 86/100; PC: 85/100; PS4: 82/100; XONE: 87/100 |
| OpenCritic | 85/100; 89% Critics Recommend |

Review scores
| Publication | Score |
|---|---|
| Destructoid | 8/10 |
| Eurogamer | Recommended |
| Hardcore Gamer | 4.5/5 |
| Nintendo Life | 9/10 |
| Nintendo World Report | 8.5/10 |
| Pocket Gamer | 4.5/5 |
| Push Square | 8/10 |

Huntdown received "generally favorable" reviews, according to review aggregator Metacritic.

Chris Moyse of Destructoid remarked: "Easy Trigger has sculptured its love letter to '80s grindhouse to hit players like a sledgehammer, bombarding them with amazing old-school visuals, fantastic sound, great music, and just enough retro-chic to pay homage to its source material".

PJ O'Reilly of Nintendo Life stated" "Huntdown is a delightfully detailed and expertly crafted throwback to old-school run n' gun arcade shooters. The 16-bit graphical style is immaculately recreated whilst adding lots of modern bells and whistles to proceedings, including a fantastic soundtrack and audio design".

Stefano Castelli from IGN Italy wrote: "an appreciable and challenging old-fashioned shooter that offers a handful of hours of intense battles, best if played in tandem with a friend." Martin Robinson of Eurogamer said that "Huntdown matches its excess with brilliant detail." and that "it looks frankly spectacular."

== Sequel ==
In a statement about Coffee Stain Studios' acquisition of Easy Trigger, it was announced that the two companies would collaborate to "continue developing the Huntdown [intellectual property]". Huntdown: Overtime, a prequel game focused on one of the main characters, was announced by Easy Trigger in January 29, 2026.
