= Goat Simulator =

2014 video game

- Steam storefront header
- Developer: Coffee Stain Studios (Note: Ported to consoles by Double Eleven and Lucid Games. Ported to Linux and OS X by icculus.org. GoatZ and Waste of Space downloadable content by Gone North Games. Goat Simulator Remastered developed in collaboration with Coffee Stain North and Fishlabs.)
- Publisher: Coffee Stain Studios (Note: Original console versions published by Double Eleven)
- Director: Armin Ibrisagic
- Producer: Johannes Aspeby
- Designer: Paul Yance
- Programmers: Johannes Aspeby; Stefan Hanna; Gustav Löfstedt
- Artist: Gustaf Tivander
- Composer: Gustaf Tivander
- Engine: Unreal Engine 3 (Note: Unreal Engine 4 for the mobile versions and Remastered)
- Platforms: Windows: Linux; OS X; Android; iOS; Xbox 360; Xbox One; PlayStation 3; PlayStation 4; Nintendo Switch; Remastered; Windows; PlayStation 5; Xbox Series X/S
- Release: 1 April 2014: Windows; 1 April 2014; Linux, OS X; 27 June 2014; Android, iOS; 16 September 2014; Xbox 360, Xbox One; 17 April 2015; PS3, PS4; 11 August 2015; Switch; 23 January 2019; Apple Arcade; 13 May 2022; Remastered; 7 November 2024
- Genre: Action
- Modes: Single-player, multiplayer

Goat Simulator is an action video game developed and published by Coffee Stain Studios. The game was released for Windows in April 2014, and ports for Linux and OS X were released in June 2014. Mobile versions for Android and iOS were released in September 2014. Versions for the Xbox 360 and Xbox One were released in April 2015, and for PlayStation 3 and PlayStation 4 in August 2015; these ports were developed by Double Eleven. A Nintendo Switch version containing the game and downloadable content was released in January 2019, and a remastered version for PlayStation 5, Windows, and Xbox Series X/S was released in November 2024.

The game has been compared by the developer to skateboarding games, but where the player controls a goat aimed at doing as much damage as possible around an open world map, without any other larger goals. The game, initially developed as a joke prototype from an internal game jam and shown in an early alpha state in YouTube videos, was met with excitement and attention, prompting the studio to build the game into a releasable state while still retaining various non-breaking bugs and glitches to maintain the game's entertainment value.

The game received mixed reviews: some reviewers praised the title for providing a humorous sandbox interface to experiment with, while others criticized the game's reliance on social media to popularize what was otherwise a simple and buggy product. A sequel, Goat Simulator 3, (Note: The game is suffixed with a '3' rather than a '2' as a joke by the developers; "Goat Simulator 2" does not exist.) was released in November 2022.

== Gameplay ==
In Goat Simulator, the player acquires points by performing acts of chaos—in this case, getting struck by a car shortly after licking a non-player human character. The game's novelty comes from various glitches in the game purposely left in place, such as the distortion of the human character's neck as a result of the collision.

Goat Simulator is an open-ended third-person perspective game in which the player controls a goat called Pilgor. The player is free to explore the game's open world — a suburban setting — as a goat, and jump, run, bash things, and lick objects. Licking objects attaches the goat's tongue to the object and lets the player drag the object around until they let go. At any time, the player can let the goat drop into a ragdoll model, allowing the game's physics to take over, and another control makes the game run in slow-motion. A number of environmental features allow the player to manipulate the goat into stunts such as bouncing off trampolines or launching the goat into the air through large fans. The game features a scoring system similar to skateboarding games like Tony Hawk's Pro Skater, whereby doing tricks or other actions earns points, while chaining such tricks together in sequence helps build a multiplier that applies to the total score of the tricks done in the sequence. Various in-game goals, such as achieving a certain height, completing flips, or destroying certain objects, are given to the player, but the player is not required to follow these instructions.

Small gold goat statues are hidden in the game's world. Mutators are progressively unlocked by obtaining the statues. Mutators are toggleable within the main menu of the game. Each adds a unique mechanic and/or appearance to the standard goat, such as changing the goat model to a demon goat, giraffe, dinosaur, ostrich, penguin, or dolphin on a wheelchair, or adding a jetpack to the goat that can be activated at any time. Various easter eggs are scattered about the sandbox, such as a castle where one can become the Queen of all Goats, or where the goat character gains a move similar to Sonic the Hedgehog's spin attack. Lead developer Armin Ibrisagic noted after release that the game's setting is a parody of the concept of Purgatory, having left references to Heaven and Hell that were later found by fans, and also noted the inclusion of some elements based on the 2014 Ukrainian revolution.

== Development ==
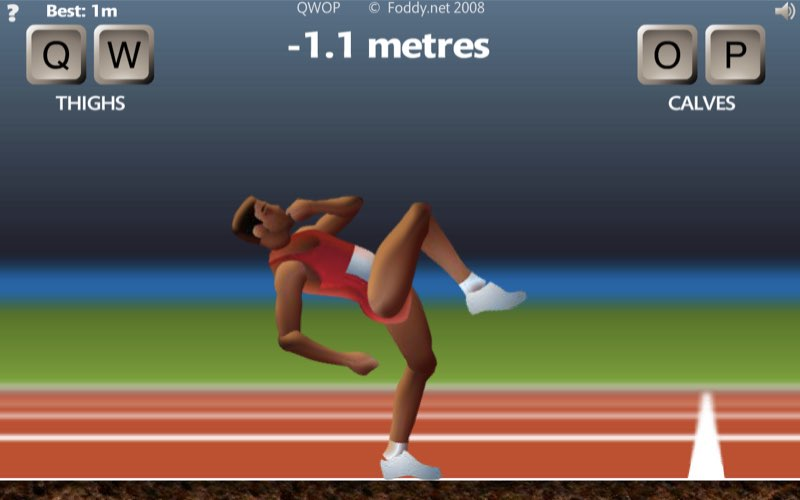
Goat Simulator was originally intended to imitate QWOP (pictured), whose title refers to the four keyboard keys used to move the muscles of the sprinter avatar.

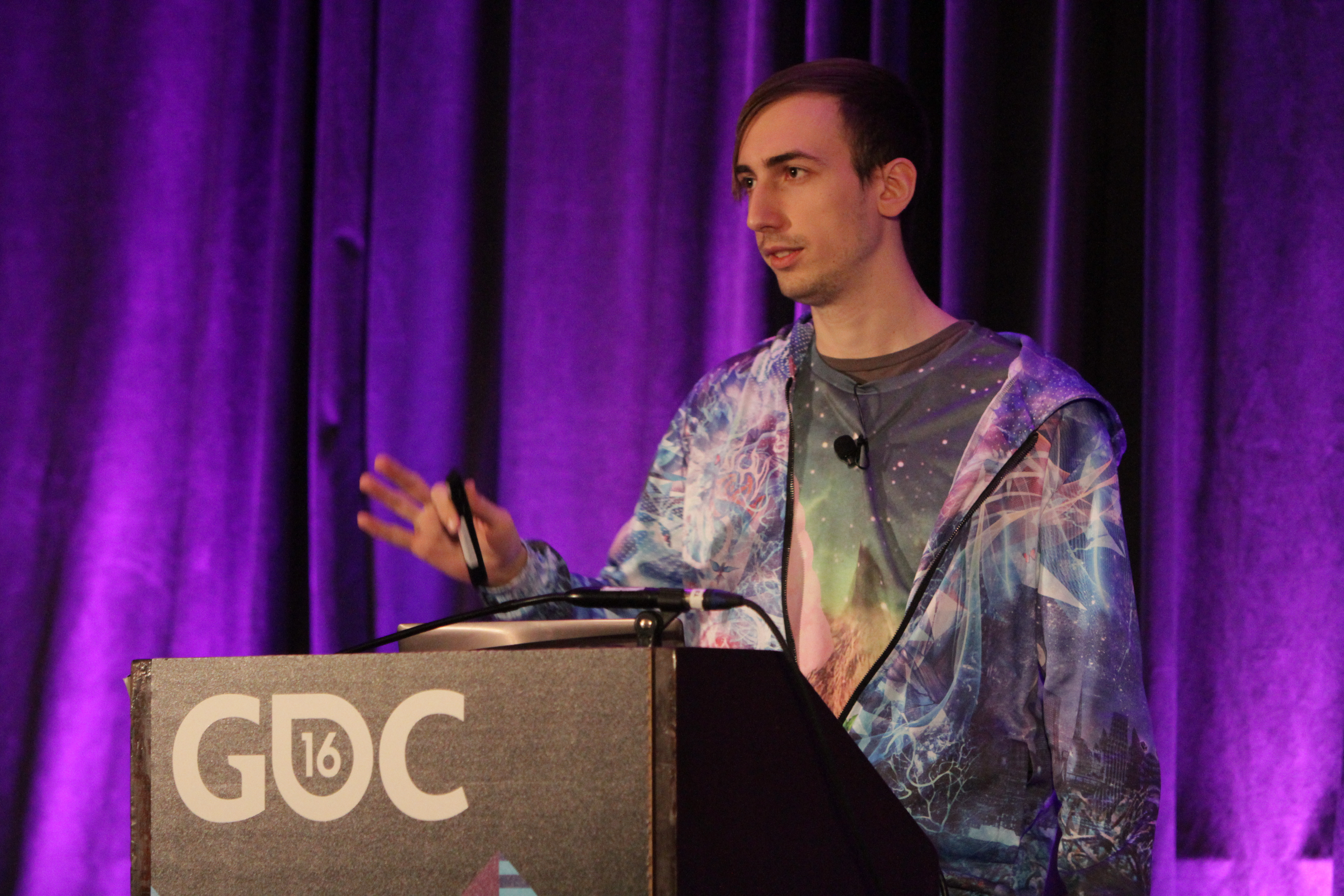
Game designer Armin Ibrisagic presents on Goat Simulator at the 2016 Game Developers Conference.

Goat Simulator started as a joke prototype from an internal one-month game jam held by Coffee Stain Studios in January 2014, after completing work for their game Sanctum 2. The game was described by Ibrisagic as "an old school skating game, except instead of being a skater, you're a goat, and instead of doing tricks, you wreck stuff". The idea followed after originally pitching the game as a variation of QWOP, where the player would control the individual limbs of the goat separately with various keyboard keys; this concept was rejected in favor of the more Tony Hawk's Pro Skater-type of gameplay the final game presents. Ibrisagic had focused on goats after jokingly trying to convince his coworkers that goats would achieve viral attention on the Internet in much the same way that cats presently do.

The prototype used Nvidia PhysX and an Apex physics engine with ragdoll physics for the goat and human models within Unreal Engine 3, a game engine they were familiar with from the Sanctum series. In-game assets were purchased from third-party vendors instead of developed in-house, such as the original goat model which the studio acquired for use for less than $20. The prototype was meant to be a parody of various other "weirdly successful" Simulation games presently available, such as Euro Truck Simulator. Ibrisagic had no intention of this becoming a full title, instead only offering the prototype for him and other developers to learn Unreal Engine 3 alongside other developers that were developing prototypes in more earnest.

Footage of the game in its alpha state was posted to YouTube by Coffee Stain, where it received more than a million views in two days and a large response from fans requesting a full release of the game in part due to various glitches in the prototype's engine. The appeal of the video was also picked up by the agricultural magazine Modern Farmer. Some journalists suggested that the title be developed into a full game even knowing it was meant as a joking title; GameSpot editor Danny O'Dwyer supported the full release of the game arguing that "games should be dumb once in a while".

The large positive response to the alpha footage convinced the studio to develop Goat Simulator as a full title to Steam, putting more people on the title. The team, having no plans for a full release, debated on whether to approach a large publisher to receive funding to help make the title into something like Grand Theft Auto, but decided to stay with a small, inexpensive title that would be truer to the teaser video. Recognizing that the glitching was part of the game's appeal, Ibrisagic only sought to fix software bugs that might cause the game to crash, leaving in the other glitches and bugs associated with the physics engine as the results from these were "really hilarious". They limited themselves to a short development time of four weeks without significant management oversight as to set an urgent but realistic goal to bring the game to a playable state. Ibrisagic felt it was important for the game to be supported on Steam, but initially feared that Valve would not accept the quirky title. He instead found Valve to be welcoming of the title, including a joking response from the company that stated "[Valve's marketing manager DJ Powers] has started wearing a goat costume to work he's so excited about this game". As part of its release, Coffee Stain added support for Steam Workshop which would let players modify the game, aware that players would likely create levels and scenarios that will glitch and crash the game for humorous results. While the physics engine allows for spectacular rendering of destruction of the game environment, which is a main feature of the game, Coffee Stain acknowledged the downside of this as "it would synchronise terribly in multiplayer". They estimated that adding multiplayer would remove "90 percent of the physics" and many other features, and left the game as a single player title at launch. The studio considered that it only spent a couple of months to complete the Windows version, and opted to outsource versions for OS X and Linux, with Ryan Gordon handling the porting.

=== Release and promotion ===
Coffee Stain Studios released Goat Simulator worldwide on 1 April 2014, aware that tying the date with April Fools' Day may raise doubts on the validity of the game. Those that pre-ordered the game through Coffee Stain's website received early access to the title three days ahead of release. The official release trailer for Goat Simulator is a loose parody of the Dead Island Reveal Trailer showing, among shots of the game, reversed slow-motion footage of the goat crashing through a building after being launched from an exploding gas station.

The studio released a free expansion and patch to the game on 3 June 2014, which in addition to fixing game-breaking issues, added new goat models, a new map to explore based on a seaside town with a carnival, more game-breaking issues, and local multiplayer for up to 4 players via split-screen. Ibrisagic believes that adding multiplayer support atop Steam Workshop support will allow creative users to develop new gameplay modes that will extend the title's playability. The patch also adds in additional controls that the player can use to make the goat perform various freestyle tricks comparable to those in Tony Hawk's Pro Skater. The studio released a second free patch to the game on 20 November 2014 called "Goat MMO Simulator", which included a gamemode that parodied massive multiplayer online games like World of Warcraft, while remaining a single player or local multiplayer experience.

A paid-content expansion titled "GoatZ" was released on 7 May 2015 as downloadable content for the game on personal computers and a stand-alone application for mobile devices. It was developed by Coffee Stain's partner studio Gone North Games. The expansion's content spoofs zombie-based survival games, such as DayZ, and includes a new map and gameplay aspects such as fighting off zombies and crafting. The title itself plays off DayZ as well as a play on the Internet meme goatse.cx. In a cross-promotional "GoatBread" update with Bossa Studios' I Am Bread, offered in late 2015, a free update to Goat Simulator allowed the players to select a piece of bread as their avatar, while I Am Bread added in a "RAMpage" mode based on Goat Simulator. Another add-on, the "Payday" DLC package, part of a cross-promotion with Overkill Software's Payday 2, Payday-inspired content for Goat Simulator was added alongside additional playable characters including a camel, flamingo, and a dolphin in a wheelchair, while Goat Simulator content was added to Payday 2. These were released in January 2016. Goat Simulator decorative content was added to Rocket League in a mid-2016 update. Another expansion, "Waste of Space", was again developed by Gone North Games and released on 26 May 2016. The expansion features a new map based on a space colony, and spoofs much of the recent science fiction media genre.

The OS X and Linux ports were released on 27 June 2014. Following the game's digital release, Koch Media agreed to distribute the game in UK and EU retail stores starting in May 2014. Similarly, Deep Silver approached Coffee Stain Studios to work out a deal to publish the title in North American retail markets starting in July 2014. At Microsoft's presentation at the 2014 Gamescom convention in August, Goat Simulator was announced as one of several titles to be coming to the Xbox One platform with the help of Double Eleven studios, and later confirmed to be also arriving for the Xbox 360, with both versions released on 17 April 2015. Koch Media also distributed a retail version of the Xbox One version, including all additional downloadable content, across Europe for release on 4 March 2016. Coffee Stain Studios also released ports for iOS and Android in September 2014. Each DLC is a separate app for iOS and Android, and each one (except Goat Simulator: Payday) includes a mobile-exclusive map. PlayStation 3 and PlayStation 4 versions, also ported by Double Eleven, were released on 11 August 2015.

With the acquisition of Coffee Stain through THQ Nordic AB on 14 November 2018, it was announced that a Nintendo Switch version of Goat Simulator would be released. Goat Simulator: The GOATY, which includes all expansions to date, was released on 23 January 2019. A version of Goat Simulator for Apple Arcade, titled Goat Simulator+ was released on 13 May 2022.

A remastered version was announced during the Gamescom Opening Night event on August 20, 2024. In addition to updated graphics, the remaster includes all DLC including those released for the mobile versions only, as well as other quality of life upgrades. It released for the PlayStation 5, Windows, and Xbox Series X/S on November 7, 2024.

In a limited time cross-promotional event with Triband's What the Car?, beginning in April 2026, a free update for Goat Simulator+ allowed players to unlock the car from What the Car? as their avatar, while What the Car? added 11 new levels in a Goat Simulator episode and a Goat Simulator themed skin.

== Reception ==
Reception

Aggregate scores
Aggregator	Score
Metacritic	iOS: 68/100; PC: 62/100; PS4: 58/100; XONE: 53/100
OpenCritic	22% recommend

Review scores
Publication	Score
Destructoid	3/10
Eurogamer	7/10
Game Informer	5/10
GameRevolution	2.5/5
GamesRadar+	1.5/5
IGN	8/10
PC Gamer (US)	30/100
TouchArcade	4/5

Goat Simulator received "mixed or average" reviews upon release, according to video game review aggregator website Metacritic. Fellow review aggregator OpenCritic assessed that the game received weak approval, being recommended by only 22% of critics. Goat Simulator was named as an honorable mention for Excellence in Audio for the 2015 Independent Games Festival.

Eurogamer's Dan Whitehead complimented Coffee Stain Studios on building in enough content Goat Simulator and potential expansion through Steam to prove it more than a simple joke title, and instead a brief diversion "in which the player is a willing participant". Dan Stapleton of IGN considered the title a "clever interactive spoof of all the broken game physics we've seen in open worlds" and despite being short, was a "hell of a good time". Tim Turi of Game Informer stated that the first hour with the game would be amusing, but due to the lack of more expansive features, he "[does not] recommend it to anyone looking for more than disposable entertainment". Steve Tilley of the Toronto Sun described the game as one where "most players will have a few hours of fun and then file [it] away as an occasional novelty to pull out when they're especially bored".

Rich Stanton of The Guardian was very critical of Goat Simulator, noting how the title is self-aware of its poor quality, and stated that the game's creation and promotion "demonstrates how social media and the internet amplify our supine tendencies". Andy Kelly of PC Gamer was also critical of the title, calling it a "bad, amateurish and boring game", and considered its popularity was only due to word-of-mouth and YouTube videos that enticed players to buy the game themselves.

While critical reviews were mixed, the game proved popular with players. The game's alpha footage, as well as Let's Play videos on pre-release copies such as that from PewDiePie and Fernanfloo, drew a great deal of demand for the game prior to release. Ibrisagic stated that Coffee Stain Studios made their money back on the development costs within a few minutes of the game being offered on Steam. As of August 2014, the studio has reported that nearly a million copies of Goat Simulator have been sold, outperforming their other games over the previous four years. The mobile release for iOS and Android systems reached 100,000 downloads within 6 days of launch. By mid-January 2015, over 2.5 million copies of the game were sold across all platforms. During a presentation at the 2016 Game Developers Conference, Ibrisagic revealed that Goat Simulator has made more than $12 million in revenue, compared to both Sanctum and Sanctum 2 which made under $2 million each. Goat Simulator was seen as a disruptive title in contrast to typical AAA titles; Paradox CEO Fredrik Wester felt they needed to publish more games like Goat Simulator, stating "You have to have an edge in there, and that's why I say 'more Goat Simulator and less Call of Duty' for Paradox, because we need the edge. It's easier to get out and market, it's easier to show what you're doing" adding that "People are tired of explosions and dubstep music. We've seen it a million times now".

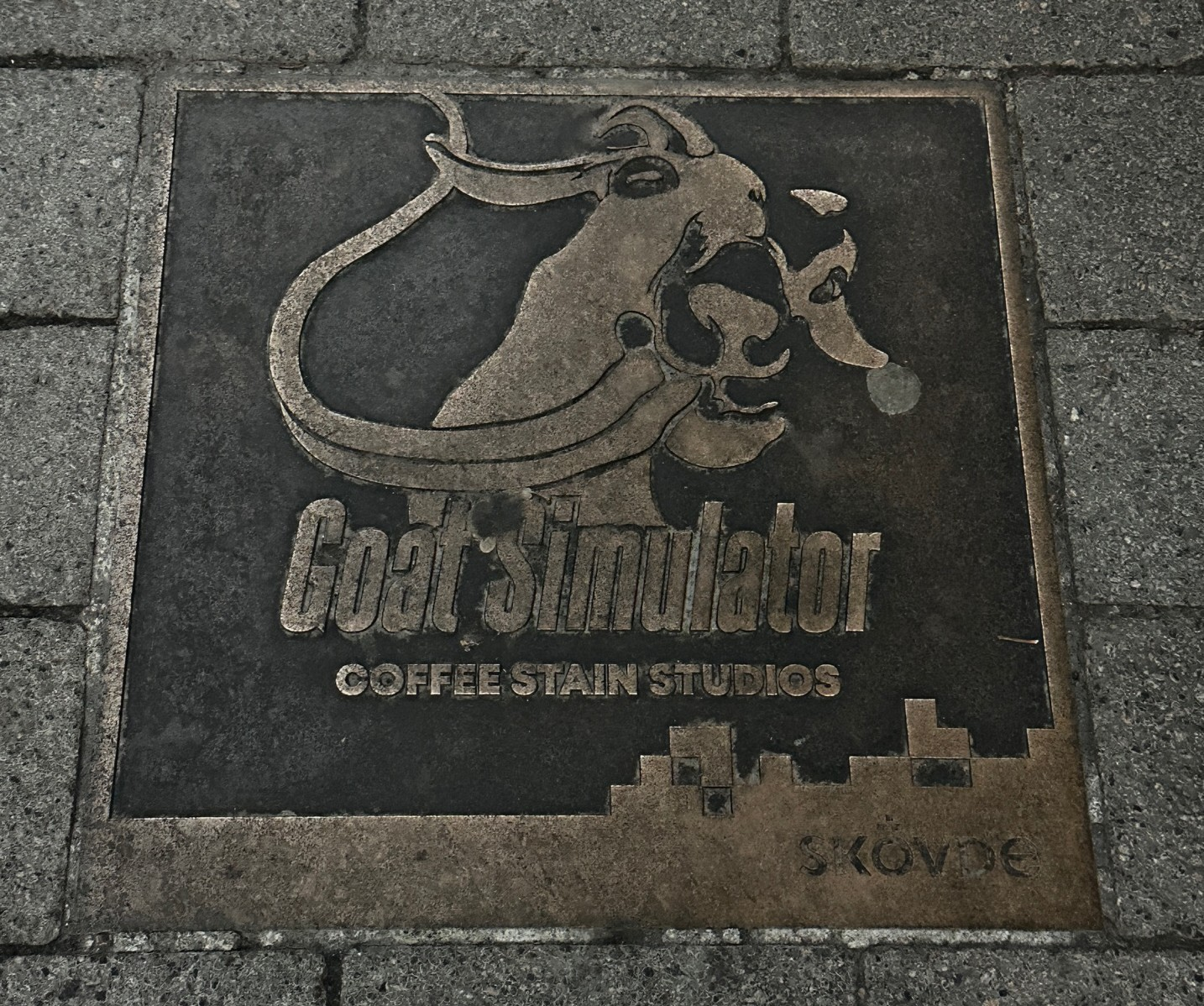
Bronze plaque for Goat Simulator on the Skövde Walk of Game

With the success of the game, Coffee Stain Studios has worked to license out Goat Simulator-themed properties with third-party vendors. It also enabled the studio to become a video game publisher for smaller studios in 2017. In 2024, Goat Simulator was one of the inaugural additions on the Walk of Game in Skövde, Sweden, dedicated to successful video games developed by studios in the city.

Several games have followed in trying to capture the same goofy style of gameplay with unpredictable physics engines as Goat Simulator, including Bear Simulator and I Am Bread. Goat Simulator as well as 2013's Surgeon Simulator are often considered the first examples of "YouTube bait" games, purposely designed to appeal to an audience watching the game being played but lacking any redeeming gameplay values.

== Sequel ==
A sequel was announced in June 2022 during the Summer Game Fest, for Windows, PlayStation 5 and Xbox Series X/S on 17 November 2022. It is titled Goat Simulator 3, skipping the name Goat Simulator 2. Goat Simulator 3 includes support for four-player online multiplayer, including several mini-games for multiplayer modes. The game is developed by Coffee Stain North, which previously handled some of the expansion packs for the game. The teaser was a parody of the Dead Island 2 teaser. Additional versions have since been released for the Xbox One, PlayStation 4, Nintendo Switch, Nintendo Switch 2, iOS, and Android.

== Adaptations ==
Zen Studios released a Goat Simulator table for Pinball FX on August 29, 2024, in what Gamespot called the weirdest crossover yet.

A card game, titled Goat Simulator: The Card Game, published by MOOD Publishing, was funded on Kickstarter in April 2025 and is expected to release in Q1 2026.
