= Coffee Stain Studios =

Swedish video game developer

Coffee Stain Studios AB
- Logo in use since 2016
- Type: Subsidiary
- Industry: Video games
- Founded: 2010; 16 years ago
- Founders: Anton Westbergh; Johannes Aspeby; Mikael Mård; Oscar Jilsén; Gustaf Tivander; Daniel Lundwall; Markus Rännare; Joakim Sjöö; Stefan Hanna
- Headquarters: Skövde, Sweden
- Key people: Robert Lazic (Studio Manager)
- Revenue: ▼657.2 million kr (2022)
- Number of employees: 123 (2022)
- Parent: Coffee Stain Group AB
- Website: coffeestain.com

Coffee Stain Studios AB is a Swedish video game developer based in Skövde. Founded in 2010 by nine University of Skövde students, the company is best known for Goat Simulator, which was released in April 2014, and Satisfactory, released in September 2024.

Its parent holding company, Coffee Stain Holding, founded video game publisher Coffee Stain Publishing in 2017, and majority-owned other video game developers. In November 2018, Coffee Stain Holding was acquired by THQ Nordic AB (later renamed Embracer Group). In December 2025, Coffee Stain Holdings spun off from Embracer Group and became known as Coffee Stain Group.

== History ==
Logo used 2010–2016

Coffee Stain Studios was founded in 2010 in Skövde, Sweden, by a group of nine students at the University of Skövde: Anton Westbergh, Johannes Aspeby, Mikael Mård, Oscar Jilsén, Gustaf Tivander, Daniel Lundwall, Markus Rännare, Joakim Sjöö and Stefan Hanna. Their first game, I Love Strawberries, was released at the end of that year for iOS by Atari.

In 2010, Coffee Stain participated in "Make Something Unreal", a modding competition for Unreal Tournament 3 held by Epic Games and Intel, with its mod, Sanctum. The mod was received well, leading Coffee Stain to adopt the Unreal Development Kit to develop Sanctum into a standalone game. In March the following year, the company struck a five-year licensing agreement with Epic for their Unreal Engine 3 technology. Sanctum as a standalone game was released in April 2011, and was followed by a sequel, Sanctum 2, in May 2013. In February 2014, Coffee Stain acquired the rights for I Love Strawberries from Atari and re-released the game for iOS with some improvements.

Coffee Stain gained significant recognition with their April 2014 release of Goat Simulator. While the title received mixed critical reviews, as it was released in a purposely buggy state to take advantage of its ragdoll physics, it became highly successful through Let's Play videos and live streamers. By August 2014, Goat Simulator had outperformed all sales of the studio's previous games combined, and had generated over US$12 million in revenue by March 2016.

On 23 February 2017, Coffee Stain announced Coffee Stain Publishing, a subsidiary that would act as the publishing entity within the Coffee Stain group. The first title to be released through Coffee Stain Publishing was Huntdown by Swedish development team Easy Trigger Games. The following day, Coffee Stain acquired a minority stake in Danish developer Ghost Ship Games, and became the publisher of their upcoming game, Deep Rock Galactic. In April 2017, Coffee Stain also gained a minority stake in newly founded Gothenburg-based studio Lavapotion. In July 2017, Daniel Kaplan, the first employee of Swedish developer Mojang, left Mojang to join Coffee Stain Publishing.

On 30 January 2018, Coffee Stain announced Levelling the Playing Field, a funding initiative aimed at small companies that employ at least as many women as men and require at most 1 million kr (about $127,000) in funding. Through this initiative, Coffee Stain invested in Danish developer Other Tales Interactive (a team of two women) in exchange for a minority stake. A second studio, Stockholm-based Kavalri, was invested in under this programme in November 2019. The following day, Coffee Stain acquired a majority stake in Gone North Games, a Swedish developer that had developed Coffee Stain-published A Story About My Uncle and downloadable content for Goat Simulator. With the acquisition, Gone North Games was rebranded as Coffee Stain North.

On 14 November 2018, the Coffee Stain group of companies and its intellectual property were acquired by Swedish holding company THQ Nordic AB (later known as Embracer Group) for 317 million kr (about $34.9 million), with the potential of additional payouts should they reach certain milestones. Coffee Stain continues to operate independently within Embracer Group, with Coffee Stain co-founder Westbergh remaining chief executive officer. At the time, the Coffee Stain group had 45 employees, of whom Coffee Stain Studios employed 24. This number rose to 25 by August 2019.

Coffee Stain expanded Levelling the Playing Field in September 2020 to cover teams including racially and ethnically diverse people, women and non-binary people. Happy Broccoli Games became the third investment under this initiative. On November 18, 2020, Embracer announced it would purchase out the 40% stake in Coffee Stain North from their founders and transition it to a fully owned subsidiary of Coffee Stain.

In August 2021, Embracer Group acquired Ghost Ship Games and Easy Trigger, putting them both under the umbrella of Coffee Stain Holding.

In February 2022, the company announced the formation of Coffee Stain Malmö, a support studio focusing on mobile titles, with Coffee Stain vice president of mobile Daniel Persson heading it. The following month, Coffee Stain announced that it had partnered with Rare Earth Games, an Austrian developer owned by Coffee Stain's sister company Amplifier Game Invest, to publish a new co-op action IP.

In August 2022, as part of a large purchase of properties, Embracer was confirmed to have acquired a "secret developer" for $100 million which would transition under Coffee Stain. In December, it was revealed by several news outlets that the purchase was of the Roblox game developer Shortcake AB and its game Welcome to Bloxburg for $100 million, and renamed the studio as Coffee Stain Gothenburg. The game's creator, Coeptus, officially confirmed the new partnership in January 2023.

In May 2025, Embracer Group announced that it would be spinning off Coffee Stain Holding and its related subsidiaries into an independent company. The spin off was completed on 11 December 2025, with the new company, Coffee Stain Group, trading on the Nasdaq First North Premier Growth Market.

In April 2026, Coffee Stain Malmö head Daniel Persson revealed on LinkedIn that the studio was shut down.

== Legacy ==
Coffee Stain Holdings was founded as the parent of Coffee Stain Studios. It became independent of Embracer Group in 2025.

- Box Dragon in Gothenburg, Sweden, founded in 2020, majority stake purchased in August 2021.
- Coffee Stain Gothenburg in Gothenburg, Sweden, founded as Shortcake AB, acquired in August 2022.
- Coffee Stain Malmö in Malmö, Sweden, founded in February 2022, closed in April 2026.
- Coffee Stain North in Stockholm, Sweden, founded as Gone North Games in 2013, 60% majority stake acquired in January 2018, fully purchased in November 2020.
- Coffee Stain Publishing, founded in February 2017.
- Coffee Stain Studios in Skövde, Sweden, founded in 2010
- Easy Trigger in Trollhättan, Sweden, founded in 2016, acquired in August 2021.
- Lavapotion in Gothenburg, Sweden, founded in 2017, 60% majority stake purchased in April 2017.

=== Ghost Ship Holding ===
Ghost Ship Holding, the holding business for developer Ghost Ship Games, was acquired by Embracer Group in August 2021 and placed under Coffee Stain Holding. It operated as a separate subsidiary.

- Ghost Ship Games in Copenhagen, Denmark, founded in Spring 2016.
- Ghost Ship Publishing, founded in February 2023.

=== Minority investments ===
Other Tales Interactive, Half Past Yellow, Ugly Duckling Games, Bolverk Games, Iron Gate Studios, Game Swing.

== Games developed ==
Year	Title	Platform(s)	Publisher(s)
2010	I Love Strawberries	iOS	Atari
2011	Sanctum	macOS, Windows	Coffee Stain Studios
2013	Super Sanctum TD	iOS, macOS, Windows	Coffee Stain Studios
2013	Sanctum 2	Linux, macOS, Windows, PlayStation 3, Xbox 360	Coffee Stain Studios; Reverb Publishing
2014	Goat Simulator	Android, iOS, Linux, macOS, Nintendo Switch, PlayStation 3, PlayStation 4, Windows, Xbox 360, Xbox One	Coffee Stain Studios; Double Eleven
2024	Satisfactory	Windows, Playstation 5, Xbox Series X/S	Coffee Stain Publishing

== Coffee Stain Publishing games ==
Year	Title	Platform(s)	Developer(s)
2014	A Story About My Uncle	Linux, macOS, Windows	Gone North Games
2016	The Westport Independent	Android, iOS, Linux, macOS, Windows	Double Zero One Zero
2018	Puppet Fever	Windows	Coastalbyte Games
2019	Tick Tock: A Tale for Two	Android, iOS, macOS, Nintendo Switch, Windows	Other Tales Interactive
2020	Deep Rock Galactic	PlayStation 4, PlayStation 5, Windows, Xbox One, Xbox Series X/S	Ghost Ship Games
2020	Huntdown	Android, iOS, Linux, macOS, Nintendo Switch, PlayStation 4, Windows, Xbox One	Easy Trigger
2022	Goat Simulator 3	PlayStation 5, Windows, Xbox Series X/S, PlayStation 4, Xbox One, Nintendo Switch, iOS, Android	Coffee Stain North
2022	Songs of Conquest	macOS, Windows, PlayStation 5, Xbox Series X/S, iOS, Android, Nintendo Switch	Lavapotion
2024	Midnight Ghost Hunt	Linux, macOS, Windows	Vaulted Sky Games
2024	Goat Simulator Remastered	PlayStation 5, Windows, Xbox Series X/S	Coffee Stain Studios, Coffee Stain North, Fishlabs
2026	Valheim	Linux, macOS, Windows, Xbox One, Xbox Series X/S	Iron Gate
TBA	As We Descend	Windows	Box Dragon
TBA	Jump Space	Windows, Xbox Series X/S	Keepsake Games
TBA	Into the Unwell	Windows	She Was Such a Good Horse
