= Humble Bundle =

Digital storefront company selling video games and e-books

Humble Bundle, Inc.
- Type: Subsidiary
- Industry: Video games
- Founded: November 24, 2010; 15 years ago
- Founders: Jeff Rosen; John Graham
- Headquarters: San Francisco, California, U.S.
- Area served: Worldwide
- Number of employees: 60 (2017)
- Parent: Ziff Davis (2017–present)
- Website: humblebundle.com

Humble Bundle, Inc. is a digital storefront for video games, which grew out of its original offering of Humble Bundles, collections of games sold at a price determined by the purchaser and with a portion of the price going towards charity and the rest split between the game developers. Humble Bundle continues to offer these limited-time bundles, but has expanded to include a greater and more persistent storefront. The Humble Bundle concept was initially run by Wolfire Games in 2010, but by its second bundle, the Humble Bundle company was spun off to manage the promotion, payments, and distribution of the bundles. In October 2017, the company was acquired by Ziff Davis through its IGN Entertainment subsidiary.

Initial bundles were typically collections of independently developed games featuring multi-platform support (including Microsoft Windows, macOS, and Linux platforms) provided without digital rights management (DRM). Occurring every few months, the two-week Humble Bundles drew media attention, with several bundles surpassing $1 million in sales. Subsequently, the bundles became more frequent and expanded to include games from established developers, AAA publishers, games for Android-based devices, bundles promoting game jams, and bundles featuring digital copies of music, books and comic books. Bundles are presently offered on a more regular basis, with a persistent storefront for individual game sales.

The Humble Bundle offerings support a number of charities, initially partnering with Child's Play and the Electronic Frontier Foundation. By the end of October 2014, participating developers had grossed more than $100 million and by September 2021, the total charitable amount raised by the Bundles exceeded $200 million across 50 different charities. The success of the Humble Bundle approach has inspired a number of similar efforts to offer "pay what you want" bundles for smaller games, including IndieGala and Indie Royale.

The Humble Bundle operation has since grown to include a dedicated storefront, the Humble Store, and a publishing arm, Humble Games, to support indie games. As a corporation, Humble Bundle was headquartered in San Francisco, California, with about 60 employees.

== History ==
Total purchases vs. time

The idea for the Bundle was from Jeff Rosen of Wolfire Games. Rosen describes the inspiration coming to him through similar sales of bundle packages on the Steam platform. Rosen had noted that such sales would have viral word-of-mouth spread across the Internet. Influence also came from a previous "pay-what-you-want" sale for World of Goo upon the title's first anniversary; over 57,000 copies of the game were purchased during this sale, generating over US$117,000 after considering PayPal handling fees. Rosen by this point was well connected with other independent developers; for example his brother David is listed as being a game tester for the Penumbra series, and Penumbra's composer Mikko Tarmia contributed to Wolfire Games' game project Overgrowth. Wolfire had also recently teamed with Unknown Worlds Entertainment to offer a bundle based on their Natural Selection 2 game. The porter of Lugaru to Linux was Ryan C. Gordon, who was also responsible for porting Aquaria to Linux. With his close ties to these independent developers, as well as Ron Carmel of 2D Boy, Rosen was able to assemble the package, taking advantage of merchant sales systems offered by PayPal, Amazon Payments, and Google Checkout to minimize the cost of transactions and distribution. The site later added the option to pay via Bitcoin only through Coinbase. As of 2025, the option to pay by BitCoin is no longer supported.

Though achieving word of mouth was a key element of the potential success of the bundle, Rosen also recognized that the process to purchase the Bundles had to be simple; including elements like user account registration or the use of a secondary download client would have potentially driven away sales. Rosen also sought to include charities in the bundle, allowing the purchaser to choose how to distribute the funds between the developers and charities. Rosen believed Child's Play was a worthwhile cause that brought video games to hospitalized children and helped to fight the stigma of video games, while he selected the Electronic Frontier Foundation to support their anti-DRM stance. The means of "pay-what-you-want" would allow purchasers to simply give the money to the charities, but Rosen felt this was not an issue and would "consider that a success" of the sale. Rosen and Wolfire employee John Graham provided technical support during the sales, handling thousands of requests through a few all-night email and chat sessions.

Rosen and Graham began planning for a second Humble Indie Bundle, which launched in December 2010 and raised $1.8 million. The two recognized the value proposition of continuing this model and spun out Humble Bundle as its own company shortly after the release of the second bundle. Rosen and Graham served as its founders. Sequoia Capital had invested $4.7 million of venture capital into Humble Bundle by April 2011, allowing Rosen and Graham to hire staff to help curate further bundles and handle customer services.

On October 13, 2017, Humble Bundle announced it had been acquired by IGN Entertainment, a subsidiary of Ziff Davis. According to the company, Humble Bundle was to continue to operate as a separate entity within IGN, with no plans to change its current business approach in the short term. Instead, Graham cited "a lot of opportunities" for the customer bases of both companies. He said that the acquisition by IGN enables them to continue to do the same sales and charity promotions "faster and better" with IGN's resources backing them. IGN's executive vice president Mitch Galbraith said that they felt Humble Bundle was a "great fit" for IGN, and would also help IGN to "give something back" by supporting its charitable drives. As IGN publishes news and reviews of video games, Galbraith responded to several concerns about conflicts of interest, saying that they "will strike the right balance when it comes to our coverage of Humble Bundle and the games they sell" as a result of the acquisition. Among steps to avoid conflicts, Galbraith said that they will keep a firm separation between the IGN editorial staff and Humble Bundle, and will implement policies to report disclosure of ownership when IGN reports on games featured on Humble Bundle's store or promotions.

Rosen and Graham, the founders of Humble Bundle, announced in March 2019 that they have stepped down as CEO and COO of the company, respectively, with Alan Patmore taking over the company operations. Rosen stated that they felt that Humble Bundle had gotten to a point where it was stable with many potential growth opportunities, but beyond his or Graham's mindset of establishing startups. The two planned to remain as advisors to the company for at least the rest of the year.

In April 2022, 10 employees were laid off in engineering and customer support as part of a restructuring effort. In November 2023, an unknown number of Humble Games employees were laid off.

In July 2024, all Humble Games employees were reportedly laid off. The company stated that it is restructuring and that Humble Bundle will not be affected.

In November 2026, a AI-generated redesign of the website that included security vulnerability was launched.

== Business activities ==
=== Humble Bundles ===
Since its inception, the Humble Indie Bundle offerings are typically a two-week period where between three and five games are offered at a pay-what-you-want model.

Humble Bundle works with developers to determine scheduling and availability of games, and make decisions about which games to include within bundles, asking themselves "will this be exciting for gamers", according to employee Richard Esguerra. The full arrangements with developers to create the bundle typically conclude a month before the bundle goes live. The Humble Bundle group earns about 15% of the total funds raised.

The purchaser is able to name any price for the bundle. The Humble Bundle website interface gives users the chance to determine how to distribute their contribution, defaulting to a specific split between the developers, the charities for that event and a "Humble tip" which is used to cover hosting and other costs of the bundle. The purchasers can choose to give all or none to any of these groups, or any combination of these. In later bundles, purchasers can also buy the bundle as a gift for others. Games are typically available as standalone clients for Microsoft Windows, macOS, and Linux-based systems; in many cases, the bundles represent the debut of a game on the latter two platforms.

The purchaser can often also obtain redeemable codes for the games on services like Steam or, less often, Desura or Origin. To avoid abuse with these services, later bundles require a minimum purchase price of $1. Starting on October 31, 2013, Steam keys are automatically applied to the user's Steam account when redeemed, in an attempt to prevent the resale of keys. Subsequently, due to feedback, individual product Steam keys from bundle sales were allowed to be giftable to other users, giving them a unique URL through which the receiver could then redeem the key through Steam.

Android-based Bundles were first launched in January 2012. These Bundles do not feature redemption codes for the Google Play store, but instead require the user to install the Humble Bundle which downloads the Android application package files for the apps directly to the user's device. Some bundles have included games available both on Android and Windows, allowing users to redeem the game for both systems. The Mobile Bundle section was removed from the website in November 2015, with mobile games being included in other bundles in reduced capacity. In May 2015, the Humble Nindie Bundle was introduced, which is the first Humble Bundle offering that includes games from a digital store on dedicated gaming consoles, being the Nintendo eShop on the Wii U and Nintendo 3DS in this case. Due to logistical complications however, the initial offering was limited only to North America, although future offers may expand into other territories. Similarly, in August 2016, Capcom offered several of its PlayStation 3 and PlayStation 4 games through a Humble Bundle (using PlayStation Network redemption codes), though also limited to North American users.

In April 2021, Humble Bundle announced that among other interface changes, they were removing the charity slider, and instead limiting the charity portion that one could give to either 5% (the default) or 15%. However, after criticism from both developers and users of the store, Humble said in May 2021 they would reverse this decision and retain these sliders, including the ability to pay fully to charity, as part of their overall site redesign. Later in July 2021, Humble announced they will implement a cap on charity amounts, assuring that between a minimum of 15-30% is kept through the storefront, though users will otherwise still be able to customize the charity split to this level. Humble said this cap was necessary for them to continue to benefit users in "the PC storefront landscape".

==== Humble Weekly Bundles ====
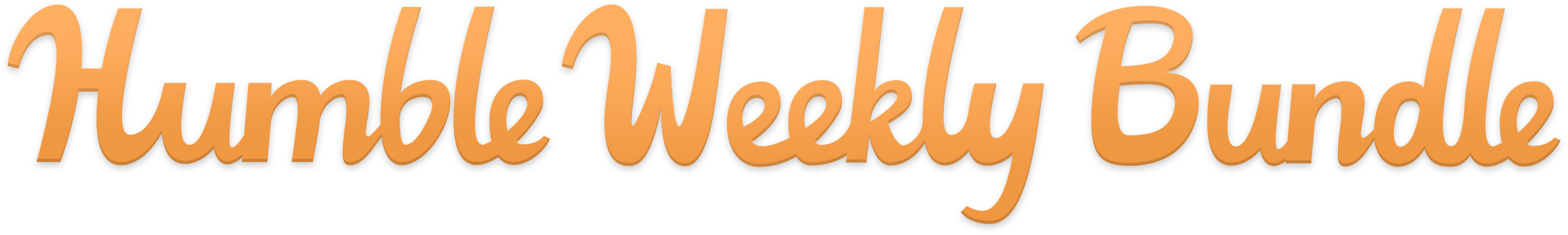
Humble Weekly Bundle logo

Following the conclusion of the Humble Android Bundle 5 in March 2013, the site announced new weekly sales that feature the same pay-what-you-want for a single title, starting with the game Bastion. As with the regular bundles, each weekly sale has several tiered payment options. Aside from only lasting one week instead of two, running consecutively with main bundles, and being based on a singular theme (often a particular developer's games), the sales work exactly like the bundles.

==== Humble Flash Bundles ====
Another extension of Humble Bundles, the first Flash Bundle debuted on July 14, 2014. Taking cues from the two week "Humble Daily Bundle" promotion, Humble Flash Bundles are similar to Weekly Sales, but only last for 24 hours and may include repeats of previous bundles and sales. These can appear anywhere between as often as once a week to once a month.

=== Humble Store ===
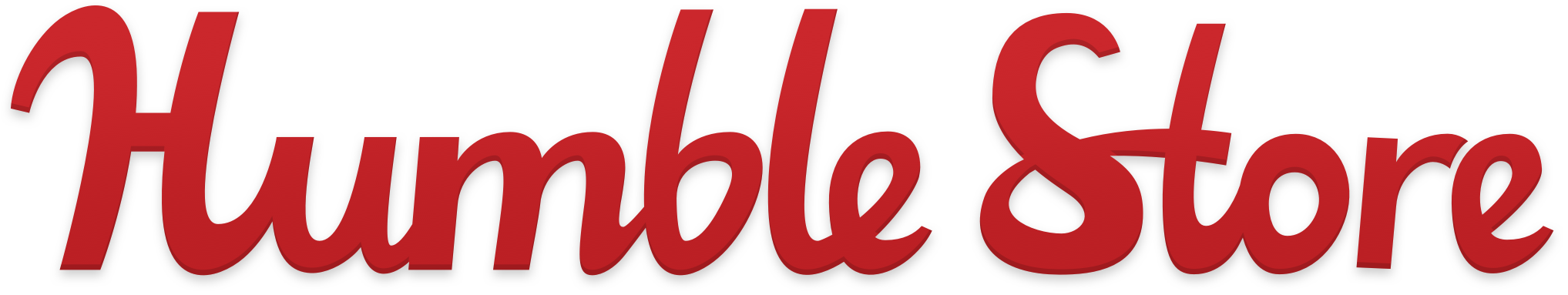
Humble Store logo

The Humble Store is an extension of the sales system developed for managing the Humble Bundles. It offers the capabilities of the payment and customer services that they had created for the various Bundles to independent developers as an alternate marketplace for these games. According to Joshua Knoles of the Humble Bundle team, they "wanted to create something that would allow developers to easily sell their games through their own web site as well as provide a painless buying experience for purchasers". Once developers have signed on with the Humble Store, they are given a widget that they can include on their web site which allows users to purchase the game (the Humble Store was usually inaccessible unless one directly searched for the widget for a particular game). In some cases, such as with FTL: Faster Than Light and Sportsfriends, the developers used the Humble Store to provide tier rewards during their crowd funding phase using sites like Kickstarter. As with the Bundles, once purchased the buyer has access to all software games from the store at any time. Ben Kuchera of "Penny Arcade Reports" compares the Humble Store as a potential competitor to virtual storefronts like Steam, offering a more personable level of service to developers and customers than these larger systems. In July 2016, Humble Bundle created its Gamepages service that offered developers that are already using the widget dedicated website space to allow them to sell and advertise their game, avoiding the need to secure this website space on their own.

A dedicated Humble Store was launched in November 2013, where single games instead of bundles were put on daily sales, with 10% of the revenues being given to charities including the EFF, American Red Cross, and Child's Play. A new section for eBooks, audiobooks and digital comics launched alongside the games store on May 15, 2014. As of May 2016, the Humble Store has raised over four million dollars for the various charities it supports.

In January 2019, the Humble Store added support for various Nintendo Switch and Nintendo 3DS games. Humble has also partnered with Epic Games to sell redeemable keys for games on the Epic Games Store.

=== Humble Monthly and Humble Choice ===
In October 2015, Humble Bundle launched its Humble Monthly subscription service; those that subscribed would receive a curated set of games at the start of each month, delivered in a similar manner as other Humble products (such as with Steam key redemption or DRM-free copies). Five percent of the subscription fees go to charity. Bowling compared the idea to a book club, allowing them to curate the monthly bundles on themes or complementary ideas. Bowling also stated that this can be a larger incentive towards developers into participating in this program since revenue for games can be better estimated based on the number of subscribers compared to their normal "pay what you want" pricing scheme.

Humble Bundle co-founder John Graham stated that while initial subscription numbers were low due to potential subscribers being unaware of what type of games were offered, that by February 2016, they have reached more than 70,000 subscribers to the service. At this level, Humble Bundle is able to use some of the money to fund the development of new games, "Humble Originals", for those subscribers in future Humble Monthlies; the first such "Humble Original" was Elephant in the Room developed by Mighty Rabbit Studios, released with the February 2016 Monthly bundle.

Starting in June 2017, those that maintained their monthly subscription also gained access to the Humble Trove, a library of DRM-free games that will expand over time, alongside the games offered through the Monthly bundles.

Humble transitioned the Monthly subscription service to Humble Choice in December 2019. While features such as access to the Humble Trove and discounts on the store remain the same, the Choice service offers at least ten games a month, and which Choice subscribers can choose a number to keep, based on their subscription tiers. A premium tier allows subscribers to keep 9 of the games, while the basic tier allows for 3. Existing Monthly subscribers were automatically transitioned to the premium tier (with the ability to keep 10 games), but at the existing Monthly subscription rate which they keep as long as they maintain their subscription. Additionally, Humble added a lower-cost tier that gives access to the Trove but no other free games.

Another change to the Choice plan was made in January 2022, keeping the subscription to a single price that would make available all games offered that month, though the number of games that are offered may change from month to month. Those on the premiere tier further have access to a rotating library of games accessible through a new app for Windows computers. However, due to this shift, Humble would no longer be able to support Mac or Linux versions of the Trove games since the launcher would be required to access them. With the change to the Trove, the discounts on the store also updated to a cumulative form, existing subscribers receiving the maximum level.

== Analysis ==
=== Success ===
The first promotion was considered to be very successful. Rosen noted that they saw the million-dollar goal as a best-case scenario, but once the sale actually started, "it was immediately clear that we were on to something". Rosen would later attribute part of the success to Ars Technica writer Mike Thompson, stating that he "immediately saw the potential" of the Bundle in an article written for the website just prior to the Bundle's sale period. Brandon Boyer of Boing Boing believed that it provided a model that "seems it could and should be repeated". The move to offer games in a price and manner that consumers were willing to buy was contrasted to larger software publishers that place artificial limitations on their content; Mike Masnick of Techdirt believed the Humble Bundle promotion worked as it "focus[ed] on giving people real reasons to buy, rather than just feeling entitled to define the terms under which they buy and looking for ways to limit those who want to interact with you in a different manner". The source for the promotion's website has been requested of Wolfire by several other groups, according to Rosen; Rosen continues to believe that many similar charitable sales can be seen in the future from the Humble Bundle's success. For future Bundles, Rosen desires to include lesser-known games in contrast to World of Goo and Braid, but has had to already reject some developers' requests to be included in a Bundle, claiming the games' quality may tarnish the Humble Indie Bundle branding. Instead, he believes smaller games with no wide profile and are "legitimately good" would be ideal for inclusion in future Bundles.

As a result of the success of the bundle, other groups have started similar pay-what-you-want plans for other indie games, including IndieGala, Indie Royale and LittleBigBunch.

PC Gamer named the Wolfire team as founders of the Humble Indie Bundle as their 2011 community heroes for their support of the indie game development market. Forbes listed John Graham in its 2013 "30 Under 30" leaders in the field of games for the success of Humble Bundle, while Rosen was recognized for the same in 2015.

After the end of the Humble eBook Bundle, John Scalzi noted that various factors, such as brand name recognition, a lack of DRM, a focus on charity, the uniqueness of the bundle and its format, and the variety of included authors, all made the Humble eBook Bundle a success. Scalzi notes that while people who participate in Humble Bundles will get less in net profit than they would have without the bundle (due to the variable percentages patrons can donate and publishers taking their cut of proceeds), but in return receive greater volume (the Humble Bundle sold 42,000 copies of eBooks in two weeks, almost as much as the average monthly bestseller). In conclusion, Scalzi lauds the idea of the Humble Bundle, and notes to future contributors that while the bundle is low-margin, it's also low-risk. Novelist Cory Doctorow, who organized both eBook bundles, noted that while no publisher aside from Tor Books would participate in the bundle because of no-DRM stipulations, they still raised around $2 million for books whose circulations were earning their authors little to no money.

Terence Lee of Hitbox Team also mentions that the Humble Bundle was a success for their game Dustforce, even after the bundle ended. When Humble Bundle first called the team and asked if they could port the game to Linux and bundle it, the game sold about ten copies on Steam daily. The day the Humble Indie Bundle 6 came out with Dustforce in it, sales through the Humble Bundle skyrocketed to over 50,000 copies per day. While Hitbox Team only received $178,000 out of the $2 million Humble Bundle made, the increased number of players caused daily sales of the game to jump from less than a dozen to around 50–60 copies per day.

On the other hand, Binding of Isaac and Super Meat Boy developer Edmund McMillen noted in a Tumblr post that the bundles are "not as successful as many would think." While the Humble Bundles are an excellent way for popular games to get a final boost in sales as well as to help lesser-known games get more attention, statistics have shown that sales dipped more in the years when Binding of Isaac and Super Meat Boy were in bundles than they were in following years. Ultimately, according to McMillen, Humble Bundles neither hurt nor help in the long run and now seem more of a tradition than anything else.

=== Piracy ===
Despite the ability to get the games at nearly zero cost, Wolfire Games estimate that 25% of the traceable downloads for the first Bundle have come from software piracy by links provided in some forums that bypass the payment screen to access the games; Wolfire further surmises additional piracy occurred through BitTorrent-type peer-to-peer sharing services. Rosen noted they purposely removed much of the DRM associated with games to appeal to those who would otherwise engage in software piracy, through both having the games ship without DRM and by having only limited copy protection on their website. Rosen also stated that for about ten users that emailed Wolfire about being unable to pay for the software, he personally donated on their behalf. Rosen comments that there may be legitimate reasons for those who appear to be pirating the game, including the inability to use the payment methods provided or that they had made a single large donation for multiple copies. Rosen also considered that there are players that would simply forward the download links to "take pleasure in spreading the pirated links to their friends or anonymous buddies for fun". Wolfire Games did take action to stop predatory sites, such as the closely named "wollfire.com", from selling illegal copies of the bundle.

While aware of the presumed software piracy, Rosen says that Wolfire will take no steps to limit it, believing that "making the download experience worse for generous contributors in the name of punishing pirates doesn't really fit with the spirit of the bundle". Rosen noted that by offering the source code of the games as an incentive, they would hope that "the community will help build them up with the same vigor that crackers tear DRM down".

In preparing for the second Humble Indie Bundle sale, John Graham acknowledged that some may still download the game through illegal means, but also said that the organizers of the bundle gave their best effort to make the process of purchasing the games simple, and they also wished to create a social impact with the sales by including contributions to Child's Play and the Electronic Frontier Foundation. An anonymous survey conducted by Wolfire for those who felt it necessary to acquire the second Bundle from other illegitimate sources showed that some preferred the option of using peer-to-peer sharing services like BitTorrent to improve the speed and reliability of the download; as a result, Wolfire added the option to download the games through BitTorrent, hoping to entice more people to acquire the game legitimately.

=== Lugaru source code ===
Several games in the Humble Indie Bundles have been released as open-source software as a result of the Bundles reaching certain sales levels. One such game was Wolfire's own Lugaru HD, where they released the engine under the GNU General Public License, and also included the various art assets, level designs, and other creative elements under a freely redistributable license for personal use. Their intent was to allow programmers to experiment and improve the game's engine using the associated assets. Wolfire later began selling the title Lugaru HD on the Mac App Store for $9.99. A company called iCoder used the open-source resources to recreate the same game for the App Store, charging only $0.99 for their version of Lugaru. iCoder claims they have the right to recreate and charge for the game under the GNU license, but Jeffery Rosen notes that this did not apply to the art assets. The iCoder version was taken down from the App Store after about a week since Wolfire notified Apple of the issue, though so far no explanation has been given by Apple. As the iCoder version of the application was popular, being the 60th most downloaded game application prior to its removal, Wolfire offered those who purchased the iCoder version a free copy of their version and codes to unlock the game from within Steam. Rosen notes that the incident may discourage developers from releasing their source in the future.

=== Abuse ===
The Humble Indie Bundle 4 overlapped with a large holiday sale on the Steam software service, which offered numerous prizes by completing some achievements associated with the offered games in Steam, including entries into a raffle to win every game on the Steam service. During this overlap, Humble Bundle found that some users were abusing the system, paying the minimum amount ($0.01) for the Bundle, registering new Steam accounts, and using the newly purchased games to improve their chances for the Steam raffle. Humble Bundle considered this "unfair to legitimate entrants" in the Steam contest, and to stop it, the company altered the sale so that only those who paid more than $1.00 would receive Steam keys for the games.

In November 2013, Humble Bundle, Inc. implemented a system on redemption of bundles that, for Steam games, would not give the user the alphanumeric key but instead automatically redeemed the key within Steam through Steam account linking as a means to avoid abuse of the key system. Despite this, Ed Key, one of the developers from Proteus which was featured in Humble Indie Bundle 8, has found by checking his game's key redemption logs that some third-party sites, like 7 Entertainment, have been offering keys to his and other games from other Humble Bundles for profit. The price these sites offer undercut the current price of such games on digital marketplaces and without reciprocating sales back to the developers or charity organizations. Such resales are against both Humble Bundle's and Steam's terms of service, and currently Humble Bundle, Inc. is working with affected developers to help stop this abuse. 7 Entertainment has responded to these issues by changing its own terms of service to the marketplaces that use it to prevent and deal with these key sales.

=== Criticism ===
The 2012 release of the Humble THQ Bundle was particularly criticized for various reasons. The bundle included non-indie, Windows-only games with DRM, which ran in contrast to the site's DRM-free pledge. THQ had also laid off a number of employees due to financial difficulties prior to the bundle, causing them to not receive a cut of the proceeds. Following the bundle, THQ's stock price increased by 30%.

In November 2026, a new site design was introduced that was criticized for drastically weakening the site's security, making it possible to reset account passwords without entering the previous password and removing the two-factor authentication functionality.
