= Indie Royale =

Indie game distributor website

Indie Royale was a website that offered digital bundles of video games with a pay-what-you-want system. Each bundle came with a minimum price that increased as more bundles were sold, incentivizing early purchases.

Indie Royale was launched in October 2011 as a joint venture between IndieGames.com, a video game journalism website, and Desura, a digital distribution service for video games. The inaugural bundle, the "Launch Bundle", contained A.R.E.S.: Extinction Agenda, Gemini Rue, Nimbus, and Sanctum. Tenshi Ventures, a company headed by industry veterans Ian Baverstock and Jonathan Newth, bought out IndieGames.com' 50% stake in Indie Royale in July 2013. After Desura and related assets (including Indie Royale) were acquired by Linden Lab and then by Bad Juju Games in November 2014, Bad Juju Games filed for bankruptcy in June 2015. OnePlay acquired Desura and Indie Royale's assets on October 29, 2016, and planned to relaunch both in 2017.
