= Lugaru =

Free and open-source video game

- Developer: Wolfire Games / David Rosen
- Release: Mac OS X; January 28, 2005; Windows; May 10, 2005; Linux; August 26, 2005
- Stable release: Lugaru HD / January 28, 2010
- Platform: AmigaOS 4, AROS, Linux, Microsoft Windows, Mac OS X
- Type: Single-player, action
- License: GPL, CC BY-SA 3.0
- Website: www.wolfire.com/lugaru
- Repository: https://gitlab.com/osslugaru/lugaru

Lugaru: The Rabbit's Foot is the first commercial video game created by indie developer Wolfire Games. It is a cross-platform, open-source 3D action game. The player character is an anthropomorphic rabbit utilizing a wide variety of combat techniques to battle wolves and hostile rabbits. The name Lugaru is a phonetic spelling of "loup-garou", which is French for werewolf. It was well reviewed and was fairly well received among the shareware community, especially among Mac users. A sequel, Overgrowth, was released in 2017.

== Story ==
The story takes place on the island of Lugaru, an unknown number of years after the fall of the human race; all of the characters are anthropomorphic animals. The story focuses on Turner, a mildly famous retired warrior rabbit who lives in a small village with his family and friends.

Unbeknownst to Turner, a pack of wolves from a nearby island had killed and eaten all of the prey that lived there, and came to Lugaru to find more food. Not wanting to make the same mistakes as before, they plan to conserve their food supply by enslaving and farming the citizens of the local rabbit kingdom rather than hunting their new food supply to extinction. Afraid for his life, the rabbit king Hickory agreed to this takeover, provided that the wolves do not harm him. To secure the deal, he sent Jack, one of his most loyal servants, to kill the local raiders, since they would be the only real resistance the wolves would encounter. To do this, Jack decides to trick Turner into killing the raiders. Jack manipulates Skipper, a close friend of Turner's, convincing him to leave Turner's village undefended as part of a ploy to spur him into killing the raiders. Jack tells him nothing about the wolves, and assures him that no one will actually be harmed during the attack. He then pays the raiders to kill everyone in the village, including Skipper.

Jack's plan is largely successful. The raiders lure Turner away from the village and attack while he is absent, murdering his entire family and nearly all of his friends. Jack stages his own death during the attack. Turner makes it his mission to avenge the deaths of his loved ones, and begins to systematically kill all of the raiders, unwittingly opening the way for the wolves to conquer Lugaru. However, everything did not go exactly to plan: the raiders decided to keep Skipper alive for a ransom. Once most of the raiders have been killed, Turner encounters Skipper in one of the raiders' camps. Skipper tells Turner how Jack manipulated him, which prompts Turner to return to his village and confirm the location of Jack's corpse. After seeing that Jack's body is missing, Turner correctly surmises that Jack had gone to the Rocky Hall (the location of the Rabbit Kingdom's monarchy) after betraying him, and decides to pursue him there.

After Turner reaches the Rocky Hall, one of the guards there informs Turner that Jack has set a bounty on him. However, most of the guards see Turner as a hero and refuse to attack him, instead pretending that they haven't seen him. Grateful, Turner leaves the Hall and goes north to continue pursuing Jack. On the way, Turner encounters and is forced to fight a desperate guard in need of money who had tracked him after he left the hall, a wolf, and five rabbit soldiers Jack had sent to kill him. Despite this, Turner finally tracks Jack down, finding him not far from where the soldiers were defeated. Seeing no reason to continue the charade, Jack explains the entire situation to Turner before being killed by him in single combat.

Having learned the terrible truth, Turner confronts king Hickory about the wolves. Hickory orders his guards to kill Turner, but in light of Hickory's dealings with the wolves, they refuse. With the full support of the king's guard, Turner proceeds to take power in a bloodless coup. He then vows to the other rabbits that he will meet with the Alpha wolf, and if need be, kill him. Hickory, determined to kill Turner and reclaim the throne, uses his connections with the wolf pack to send three wolf assassins to try and kill him before he reaches the Alpha. However, Turner manages to defeat the assassins and later finds Hickory hiding in the mountains with two of his most loyal guards. Not knowing the fate of the assassins, Hickory threatens Turner with them, and is shocked when Turner reveals he was able to kill them. Turner confronts Hickory over his cowardice in not even trying to fight against the wolf conquest, angering him, and prompting him to attack. Turner kills Hickory in the ensuing battle and steals his sword.

Bolstered by his recent victories, and growing misanthropy due to his recent struggles, Turner finally reaches the wolves' den and kills every wolf there, including the mothers and children. Ash, the Alpha wolf, arrives later. Ash warns that if Turner defeats him it would mean ruin for the rabbits as they would overpopulate, causing famine and civil war without the wolves enforcing the natural order. Turner counters this by stating that if he does not kill the wolves, they would just lose control and kill all the rabbits again, starving themselves out, and that a death by his hand would be more honorable. In the ensuing battle, Turner manages to successfully overpower Ash and defeat him. After this he returns to the Rocky Hall, where he is offered the chance to become king, since no one would dare challenge the power of a rabbit who killed an entire wolf pack. Turner declines, feeling that he is not up to governing, and decides to wander the island trying to find a new purpose for his life.

== Gameplay ==
Turner about to use a Bo staff on a wolf

Most of Lugaru's gameplay consists of Hand-to-hand combat with a heavy emphasis on Martial arts, and in many cases the combat incorporates knives, swords, and bo staves. The player can perform disarms, reversals, and counter-reversals. Despite the focus on melee combat, the player is not limited to outright attacking their enemies, since Lugaru has pronounced elements of stealth gameplay, and actively rewards players for defeating foes while remaining undetected.

Lugaru's combat controls are entirely original. There are only three context-sensitive action buttons: one attack button, a jump button, and a more general crouch-reverse button. This setup puts special emphasis on the timing and positioning of attacks to maximize their effectiveness, rather than memorizing complicated key combinations to do more damage.

There is no HUD, so the player must rely entirely on visual cues to determine Turner's current state of health; most notably the character's posture, visible injuries on his body, darkness and blurred vision. The player must also keep note of various environmental factors such as sounds, the direction of the wind and the presence of blood on their weapons; since wolf enemies have a strong sense of smell, are less approachable from downwind, and can also smell blood from both open wounds and soiled weaponry. Similarly, rabbits have great hearing and are sensitive to noises generated by rustled bushes.

The game can be played in campaign mode, which includes mission-specific objectives and the storyline, as well as a "challenge" mode, which involves the player progressing through a series of fourteen maps with the goal of clearing them of all hostile creatures. There is also an interactive tutorial.

== History ==
=== Development ===
Lugaru was made almost solely by David Rosen, including the game engine, models, animations and story. It was one of the first independently produced video games to employ ragdoll physics. It uses a unique combat system that bases attacks and counters on timing and context rather than different key combinations. Originally released January 28, 2005 for Mac OS X, Windows and Linux followed that year as target platforms.

=== Open sourcing with Humble Indie bundle ===
In 2010, after the success the first Humble Indie Bundle Lugaru was part of, Wolfire released the source code of Ryan C. Gordon's code branch of Lugaru under the GNU General Public License on May 11, 2010.

The source code availability allowed the game to be ported to additional platforms such as AmigaOS 4 or OpenPandora. In November 2016 David Rosen relicensed all assets under the open content CC BY-SA 3.0 Creative Commons license which makes Lugaru a fully free video game. In the beginning of 2017 the HD version followed. Development continues on a GitLab repository by the community.

=== Lugaru HD ===
Tim Soret would later improve the game's graphical textures, and Wolfire currently sells this updated version as Lugaru HD.

=== Sequel ===
David Rosen has announced that Overgrowth would be the sequel to Lugaru. A remake of Lugaru was included in Overgrowth.

== Reception ==
Game designer Jacob Driscoll reviewed Lugaru in his web series, Game Design by Jacob Driscoll.

It's a good sign that the minor flaws I'm seeing are mostly a situation of wanting to see more. I want more contextual fighting moves, more world exploration, better use of the variety of weapons, armor, and enemy strategies (I could've used more stealth, or more situations where enemies alerted their allies, or more verticality to the stages). Brawlers are quite different from my normal fare, and I would've appreciated a little more involved strategy – I feel like a few of my victories were more based on getting off lucky Leg Cannon attacks than on any real meaningful choices – but honestly the game was short enough and combat was fun enough that the run-block-kick-run-LEG CANNON cycle I found myself using didn't get that old. The thing felt really cohesively done.

— Jacob Driscoll, Game Design by Jacob Driscoll,

Ian Beck of InsideMacGames gave Lugaru an 8.25 out of 10 after an in-depth, three-page review. He criticized the game's linear story as a minor drawback and the ragdoll physics as being "mildly ridiculous". However, he praised the game's graphics as being "very good" (with consideration given to the game's low budget), and he also praised the motion blur, slow motion effects, and the attention the developer gave to environmental details like the blood effects on both the terrain and the character models. He especially praised the context-based combat system.

Stephen Kelly of Blue Mage Reviews praised Lugaru's "advanced, innovative combat system" and noted that the game's "strategic depth prolongs replay value", while mentioning that the game can be frustratingly difficult at times, and has poor visuals. He also said, "It's a testament to the core gameplay that it continues to entertain well after the story mode is completed, and its blend of unusual ideas should be remembered and learned from in the future."

As of June 2013, GameRankings lists only a single review for the game: David Vizcaino of Gamers Daily News, who gave Lugaru an 8.3, stated the game is "well worth trying out if you're looking for something fun/challenging to play".

GamingOnLinux reviewer Hamish Paul Wilson gave the game 8/10, stating that it is "an impressive feat, if anything over ambitious and yet still executed with a fair amount of competence and skill. Though it has some rough edges, it offers an experience unparalleled by any other title, be it the console fighting games that established the genre or its counterparts on the desktop computer."

== See also ==
- List of open source games
