= Sanctum (2011 video game) =

- Developer: Coffee Stain Studios
- Publisher: Coffee Stain Studios
- Engine: Unreal Engine 3
- Platforms: Microsoft Windows, OS X
- Release: Microsoft Windows: WW: 15 April 2011; OS X: WW: 14 August 2012
- Genres: First-person shooter, tower defense
- Modes: Single-player, multiplayer

Sanctum is a first-person shooter tower defense video game, developed by independent developer Coffee Stain Studios. It was released on Steam for Microsoft Windows on 15 April 2011. The successor, Sanctum 2, was announced in 2012 and released in May 2013.

== Plot ==
In Sanctum, players take on the role of Skye, an elite soldier sent out to protect her home town, Elysion One, from hordes of mysterious alien creatures. To be successful in the task, the player will have to defend a "core" on each level. To accomplish this, the player builds defensive structures, and assists their structures by fending off the enemies themselves.

== Gameplay ==
Bridge level with core in the background

The gameplay in Sanctum is divided into the building phase and the extermination phase. In the building phase, the player builds structures on a pre-defined grid, using the eight 'towers' chosen at the start of the level. These towers include stationary weapons, teleporters for the player's use, and pads that affect enemies moving over them. The player can also upgrade any of the three weapons equipped at the start. Building and upgrading both cost points, which are gained when enemies are killed.

In the extermination phase, a wave of one or more enemy types moves across the level towards the core. With each enemy that reaches the core, the condition of the core degrades from 100%; when the condition reaches 0%, the game ends. Unlike most tower defense games, the player is allowed to move about the level during this phase and attack enemies with different weapon types, much like in a typical first-person shooter. Touching enemies will result in the player being knocked back, but no damage is done.

There are ten types of enemies in the game, three of which are air-borne. Because certain towers are more effective against certain enemies, and only a select few towers affect flying enemies, the player must plan for all possibilities when building defenses. To aid the player in this, information about upcoming waves is shown in the pause menu, as well as descriptions of the various enemies, towers, and weapons.

The different enemy types have varying travel speeds, hit points, and resistances. For example, Runners are weak and fast while Soakers have large health pools and travel slowly. Some enemies have complete immunity against certain towers (such as flying enemies not taking any damage from gatling gun towers). Other enemies include the Walker, Bobble-Head, Hoverer, and Tank. This variation of enemy traits forces the player to construct different tower types in order to mount a successful defense.

== Development ==
The beta was made available to all people who pre-purchased the game on Steam. The beta only allowed players to play one map in both singleplayer and multiplayer.

== Reception ==
Reception

Aggregate score
Aggregator	Score
Metacritic	70/100

Review score
Publication	Score
GameSpot	7/10

Sanctum received mixed reviews from critics. The review aggregation website Metacritic estimates a score of 70 out of 100, based on 22 reviews.

== Sales ==
Sanctum sold more than 180.000 copies via digital distribution by August 2011.
