= Sanctum 2 =

2013 video game

- Developer: Coffee Stain Studios
- Publishers: Coffee Stain Studios; Reverb Publishing (consoles)
- Engine: Unreal Engine 3
- Platforms: Microsoft Windows, OS X, Linux, PlayStation 3, Xbox 360
- Release: Microsoft Windows, Xbox 360: WW: 15 May 2013; PlayStation 3: NA: 10 September 2013; OS X, Linux: WW: 14 August 2014
- Genres: First-person shooter, tower defense
- Modes: Single-player, multiplayer

Sanctum 2 is a first-person shooter tower defense video game, developed by independent developer Coffee Stain Studios for Microsoft Windows, OS X, Linux, PlayStation 3 and Xbox 360. The successor to Sanctum, Sanctum 2 was announced in 2012 and released on 15 May 2013.

== Setting ==
Sanctum 2 takes place in the future on the planet Loek-III where a major human colony has been established by the Britech Foundation in the city of Elysion-1, a vast elegant metropolis. A previous arboreal settlement, Brightholme, had been set up in the wilderness but had collapsed from repeated attacks by the Lumes, a race of diverse creatures native to the planet. It is hinted that some settlers still survive in the ruins of Brightholme and are part of an obscure organisation known as Tsygan, which is opposed to the vast, almost governmental power that Britech holds. Tsygan is a minority compared to the "Brightsiders" – those who side with Britech. Key to the colonies' survival are Cores, which appear as large blue spheres of energy. They convert inert gases like nitrogen into oxygen, and cleanse areas of toxic mushroom-like spores native to Loek-III, which are linked to Lume activity.

The Lumes, which are hostile to Cores, propagate large plant-like access shafts until they are close to a Core, and then launch a coordinated attack on the Core until it is destroyed. If successful, the area will become swamped with poisonous spores. To counter the Lumes, the Britech Foundation has created and armed a military wing known as the Core Guardians, who are tasked to defend the Cores using their arsenal of weapons and defensive towers. The war between Britech and the Lumes has been going on and off for an indeterminate amount of time.

The player takes control of one of four Core Guardians in the game, and it is shown they travel together as a squad. Skye Autumn, the player character of the first game; and Sweet Autumn, Skye's younger sister; both follow on from their father, who was killed in action. Haigen Hawkins is a former Brightholme slum dweller who somehow managed to make it to Elysion-1 and join the military. SiMo, a robot designed to aid the Core Guardians, is the fourth character.

== Plot ==
Upon returning to duty, the Core Guardians are immediately alerted to a major attack on the Facility, a key research and industrial hub. Skye is deployed to a Britech center under assault by Lumes and successfully neutralizes the threat. The team then regroups to fend off Lume attacks at various strategic locations, including a hotel park, a research lab, and the facility's main entrance, culminating in the defeat of a powerful boss, the Walker Patriarch.

The Guardians are then dispatched to the rocky fields area to defend several outposts. As they activate old cores to sterilize spores and fend off ensuing Lume attacks, they uncover the true mission objective: to find an abandoned lab in the ruins of Brightholme that holds information on the origin of the Lume attacks. They discover that the cores' usage has increased spore production, worsening the Lume threat. Skye and Haigen decide to transmit this data to Tsygan instead of Britech.

Following earthquake fault lines, the Guardians find a massive, artificial cavern beneath the original facility. After traversing a swamp, they confront a colossal Lume, the source of the attacks, which destroys the area and surfaces. The Guardians escape and see the giant creature advancing towards Elysion 1, leaving the city's fate uncertain at the end of the game.

== Reception ==
Sanctum 2 received mostly positive reviews from critics. The game holds an aggregated Metacritic score of 77/100 for Microsoft Windows, based on 28 critic reviews, and for Xbox 360, based on 12 critic reviews.
