= List of indie game developers =

This is a list of indie game developers, which includes video game developers who are not owned by nor do they receive significant financial backing from a video game publisher. Independent developers, which can be single individuals, small groups, or large organizations, retain operational control over their organizations and processes. Some self-publish their own games while others work with publishers.

== List of notable developers ==
Legend
Active
Defunct and/or no longer active
Undetermined status

There are thousands of independent game development studios which either self-publish their titles, or enter into licensing or co-development agreements with publishers. This list is not intended to be exhaustive with respect to developers or their games, and includes only notable developers and their most notable game examples.

Developer	City	Autonomous area	Country	Notable games	Notes
17-Bit	Kyoto		Japan	Skulls of the Shogun; Galak-Z: The Dimensional	Founded as Haunted Temple Studios in 2009
ACE Team	Santiago	Santiago	Chile	Zeno Clash; Rock of Ages	
AdHoc Studio	Los Angeles	California	United States	Dispatch; The Wolf Among Us 2	
Akupara Games	Los Angeles	California	United States	Whispering Willows; The Metronomicon: Slay the Dance Floor; Draw a Stickman: Epic 2; The Darkside Detective (franchise); Rain World; Manifold Garden; Mutazione	Includes developer and porting credited titles
Alec Holowka	Winnipeg	Manitoba	Canada	Crayon Physics Deluxe; I'm O.K – A Murder Simulator; Aquaria; Night in the Woods	
Amanita Design	Brno		Czech Republic	Samorost series; Machinarium; Botanicula	
Ambrosia Software	Rochester	New York	United States	Escape Velocity series	
AmnesiaGames	Santiago de Chile		Chile		
Ankama Games	Roubaix		France	Dofus	Denton Designs
Anna Anthropy	Oakland	California	United States	Dys4ia; Mighty Jill Off	
Arcane Kids	Los Angeles	California	United States	Zineth; Bubsy 3D: Bubsy Visits the James Turrell Retrospective; Perfect Stride; Sonic Dreams Collection	
Arcen Games	Durham	North Carolina	United States	AI War series; A Valley Without Wind series; The Last Federation	
Arrowhead Game Studios	Stockholm		Sweden	Magicka; Helldivers	
Artix Entertainment	Land o' Lakes	Florida	United States	AdventureQuest; DragonFable; MechQuest; AdventureQuest Worlds; WarpForce; EpicDuel; HeroSmash	
Atelier 801	Lille	Hauts-de-France	France	Transformice	
Aventurine SA	Athens		Greece	Darkfall Online	
Bennett Foddy		New York	United States	QWOP; Getting Over It with Bennett Foddy	
The Behemoth	San Diego	California	United States	Alien Hominid; Castle Crashers; BattleBlock Theater; Pit People	
Benjamin Rivers	Toronto	Ontario	Canada		
Big Finish Games	Salt Lake City	Utah	United States	Three Cards to Midnight	
Blitz Games Studios	Warwickshire		United Kingdom (England)	Powerup Forever; Droplitz; Invincible Tiger: The Legend of Han Tao	
Blue Fang Games	Waltham	Massachusetts	United States	Zoo Tycoon series	
Bohemia Interactive	Prague		Czech Republic	Operation Flashpoint: Cold War Crisis; ArmA: Armed Assault; Take On Mars; DayZ	
Boomzap Entertainment	Singapore		Singapore		
Capybara Games	Toronto	Ontario	Canada	Superbrothers: Sword & Sworcery EP; Critter Crunch; Might & Magic: Clash of Heroes; Super Time Force	
CBE Software	Brno		Czech Republic	J.U.L.I.A.; J.U.L.I.A. Among the Stars	
CCP Games	Reykjavík		Iceland	Eve Online	
Choice Provisions	Santa Cruz	California	United States	Bit.Trip series	Formerly Gaijin Games
Christine Love	Toronto	Ontario	Canada	Digital: A Love Story; don't take it personally, babe, it just ain't your story; Analogue: A Hate Story	
Chromatic Games	Gainesville	Florida	United States	Dungeon Defenders	
Cinemax	Prague		Czech Republic	Numen: Contest of Heroes; Gumboy: Crazy Adventures; Inquisitor	
John Clowder			United States	Middens; Gingiva; Where They Cremate the Roadkill	
Comcept	Tokyo and Osaka		Japan	Mighty No. 9	Founded by Keiji Inafune
Compulsion Games	Montreal	Quebec	Canada	Contrast; We Happy Few	
ConcernedApe	Seattle		United States	Stardew Valley, Haunted Chocolatier	Developer and publisher
Craneballs Studio	Ostrava		Czech Republic	Planet Nomads	
Croteam	Zagreb		Croatia	Football Glory; Serious Sam series; The Talos Principle	
Crytek Black Sea	Sofia		Bulgaria	Knights of Honor; WorldShift	Formerly Black Sea Studios
Curve Games	London	England	United Kingdom	Fluidity series; Stealth Inc. series	
Daedalic Entertainment	Hamburg		Germany	Edna & Harvey series; The Whispered World; Deponia series; The Dark Eye series; The Night of the Rabbit	
Daisuke Amaya			Japan	Cave Story; Kero Blaster	
Datcroft Games	London	England	United Kingdom	Fragoria	
Daniel Benmergui	Buenos Aires		Argentina	Today I Die; I Wish I Were the Moon; Storyteller	
Daniel Remar			Sweden	Iji	
Davilex Games	Houten	Utrecht	Netherlands	A2 Racer	
Denis Galanin			Russia	Hamlet or the Last Game without MMORPG Features, Shaders and Product Placement; The Franz Kafka Videogame	
Derek Smart	Fort Lauderdale	Florida	United States	Battlecruiser 3000AD; Universal Combat	
Derek Yu	Pasadena	California	United States	I'm O.K – A Murder Simulator; Aquaria; Spelunky; Spelunky 2; Eternal Daughter	
Digital Happiness	Bandung	West Java	Indonesia	Dreadout	
Dreadlocks	Prague		Czech Republic	Rune Legend; Dex	
Drinkbox Studios	Toronto	Ontario	Canada	Tales From Space: Mutant Blobs Attack; Guacamelee!; Severed	
Dr. Panda	Chengdu		China		Formerly TribePlay
Edmund McMillen	Santa Cruz	California	United States	Gish; Super Meat Boy; Aether; Spewer; The Binding of Isaac; The Binding of Isaac: Rebirth; Mewgenics	
Elixir Studios	London	England	United Kingdom	Republic: The Revolution; Evil Genius	
Eurocom	Derby	England	United Kingdom	Sphinx and the Cursed Mummy; Batman Begins; Pirates of the Caribbean: At World's End; Vancouver 2010: The Official Videogame of the Winter Olympic Games; GoldenEye 007	
Evony, LLC	Guangzhou		China	Evony: Age I	
Extremely OK Games	Vancouver	British Columbia	Canada	TowerFall; Celeste; Earthblade	Formerly Maddy Makes Games
Facepunch Studios	Walsall	England	United Kingdom	Garry's Mod; Rust	
Firefly Studios	London	England	United Kingdom	Stronghold; Stronghold 2; Space Colony; Stronghold 3; Dungeon Hero; Civ City: Rome; Stronghold Kingdoms	
Flying Wild Hog	Warsaw		Poland	Hard Reset; Shadow Warrior series	
Freebird Games	Markham	Ontario	Canada	To the Moon	
Frictional Games	Helsingborg		Sweden	Penumbra series; Amnesia: The Dark Descent; Amnesia: Rebirth; SOMA	
Frima Studio	Quebec City	Quebec	Canada	Chariot; Zombie Tycoon	
Frogwares	Kyiv		Ukraine	Journey to the Center of the Earth; Sherlock Holmes: Secret of the Silver Earring; Sherlock Holmes: The Awakened; Dracula: Origin	
Frontier Developments	Cambridge		United Kingdom (England)	Frontier: Elite II; LostWinds; LostWinds: Winter of the Melodias	
Fullbright	Portland	Oregon	United States	Gone Home	
Games Distillery	Bratislava	Bratislava Region	Slovakia	Aqua	
GarageGames	Eugene	Oregon	United States	Marble Blast Ultra	
Gareth Damian Martin			United Kingdom	In Other Waters, Citizen Sleeper, Citizen Sleeper 2: Starward Vector	
Giant Sparrow	Santa Monica	California	United States	The Unfinished Swan; What Remains of Edith Finch	
Gogii Games	Moncton	New Brunswick	Canada		
Greenheart Games	Brisbane	Queensland	Australia	Game Dev Tycoon	
Grip Digital	Prague		Czech Republic	Atomic Ninjas; The Solus Project	
Guild Software	Milwaukee	Wisconsin	United States	Vendetta Online	
Haemimont Games	Sofia		Bulgaria	Tropico 3; Tzar: Burden of the Crown	
Halfbrick Studios	Brisbane	Queensland	Australia	Fruit Ninja; Jetpack Joyride	
Hanako Games			United Kingdom	Cute Knight; Fatal Hearts	
hap inc.	Tokyo		Japan	Hide & Dance!; Mom Hid My Game! series	
Hazelight Studios	Stockholm		Sweden	A Way Out; It Takes Two	
Heart Machine	Culver City	California	United States	Hyper Light Drifter	
Hello Games	Guildford	England	United Kingdom	Joe Danger series; No Man's Sky; The Last Campfire	
Hexage	Mníšek pod Brdy		Czech Republic	Reaper: Tale of a Pale Swordsman; Redcon	
Hidden Path Entertainment	Bellevue	Washington	United States	Defense Grid: The Awakening; Defense Grid 2	
Himalaya Studios	Chandler	Arizona	United States	Al Emmo and the Lost Dutchman's Mine	
House House	Melbourne	Victoria	Australia	Untitled Goose Game	
Ice-Pick Lodge	Moscow		Russia	Pathologic; The Void	
Image & Form	Gothenburg		Sweden	SteamWorld series	
Inti Creates	Ichikawa	Chiba	Japan	Mega Man Zero series; Mega Man ZX series; Gal Gun series; Azure Striker Gunvolt series; Blaster Master Zero	Developer and publisher, formed by ex-Capcom staff
Introversion Software			United Kingdom	Uplink; Darwinia; DEFCON; Subversion (cancelled); Multiwinia; Prison Architect	
Invictus Games	Debrecen		Hungary	Project Torque	
Jagex	Cambridge	England	United Kingdom	RuneScape; Ace of Spades	
Jason Rohrer	Potsdam	New York	United States	Passage; Gravitation; Between	
Jonatan "Cactus" Söderström	Gothenburg		Sweden	Clean Asia!	
Jph Wacheski	Ottawa	Ontario	Canada		
Keen Software House	Prague		Czech Republic	Miner Wars 2081; Space Engineers	
Kiro'o Games	Yaounde		Cameroon	Aurion: Legacy of the Kori-Odan	
Kitfox Games	Montreal	Quebec	Canada	Shattered Planet; The Shrouded Isle; Boyfriend Dungeon; Pupperazzi	Developer and publisher
Kloonigames			Finland	Crayon Physics Deluxe	
Kunos Simulazioni	Vallelunga Circuit	Latium	Italy	Assetto Corsa; Ferrari Virtual Academy; netKar Pro	
Laminar Research	Columbia	South Carolina	United States	X-Plane	
Larian Studios	Ghent		Belgium	Divinity: Original Sin; Divinity: Original Sin II; Baldur's Gate III	Developer and publisher
Lazy 8 Studios	San Francisco	California	United States	Cogs; BioShock Infinite: Industrial Revolution	
Lindsay Grace	Washington, DC	District of Columbia	United States	Big Huggin'	
Little Green Men Games	Zagreb		Croatia	Starpoint Gemini; Starpoint Gemini 2	
Llamasoft			United Kingdom	Polybius (2017 video game); Space Giraffe; Gridrunner Revolution	
Longbow Games	Toronto	Ontario	Canada	Tread Marks; DX-Ball 2; Hegemony (video game series)	Originally founded as Longbow Digital Arts
Madfinger Games	Brno		Czech Republic	Shadowgun; Dead Trigger; Dead Trigger 2; Unkilled; Shadowgun Legends	
MDickie			United Kingdom	Wrestling Empire	
Mega Cat Studios	Pittsburgh	Pennsylvania	United States	Bite the Bullet; Log Jammers	
Messhof	Los Angeles	California	United States	Nidhogg	
MidBoss	San Francisco	California	United States	Read Only Memories	
Mode 7 Games	Brighton	East Sussex	England	Frozen Synapse series; Tokyo 42	
Mike Bithell			United Kingdom	Thomas Was Alone; Volume	
Molleindustria	Turin		Italy	Faith Fighter; Phone Story	
Moon Studios	Vienna		Austria	Ori and the Blind Forest; Ori and the Will of the Wisps	The studio began as an xbox game studios first-party developer and their first commercial video game was the Ori video game series which was entirely financed by Microsoft who also holds the games Intellectual Property.
Muse Games	New York City	New York	United States	Guns of Icarus Online	
NeocoreGames	Budapest		Hungary	The Incredible Adventures of Van Helsing	
New Star Games			United Kingdom	New Star Soccer	
Nicalis	Santa Ana	California	United States	NightSky; Cave Story; VVVVVV; 1001 Spikes; The Binding of Isaac: Rebirth	Developer and publisher
Nifflas	Umeå		Sweden	Knytt; Knytt Stories; Within a Deep Forest	
Nival	Moscow		Russia	Blitzkrieg; Silent Storm	
Number None		California	United States	Braid; The Witness	
The Odd Gentlemen		California	United States	The Misadventures of P.B. Winterbottom	
Owlchemy Labs	Boston	Massachusetts	United States	Snuggle Truck; AaaaaAAaaaAAAaaAAAAaAAAAA!!!; Rick and Morty: Virtual Rick-ality; Job Simulator: The 2050 Archives	
Parabole	Quebec City	Quebec	Canada	Kona	
Parallax Studio	Nixa	Missouri	United States	Darkstar: The Interactive Movie	
PixelJAM Games			United States	Dino Run	
Polytron Corporation	Montreal	Quebec	Canada	Fez	
Playdead	Copenhagen		Denmark	Limbo; Inside	
Puppy Games	Notting Hill	England	United Kingdom	Revenge of the Titans; Droid Assault	
Positech Games			United Kingdom	Democracy; Gratuitous Space Battles	
Private Moon Studios			Hungary	AGON series; Yoomurjak's Ring	
PikPok	Wellington		New Zealand	GripShift; Shatter; Rugby Challenge series; Rugby League series (2003-2010)	originally "Sidhe"
Provox Games	Zagreb		Croatia	Space Force: Rogue Universe	
Punch Entertainment	Palo Alto	California	United States		
Q-Games	Kyoto	Kyoto Prefecture	Japan	Star Fox Command; PixelJunk series	
Queasy Games			Canada	Everyday Shooter; Sound Shapes	
Rake in Grass	Prague		Czech Republic	Jets 'n' Guns; Larva Mortus	
Red Thread Games	Oslo		Norway	Dreamfall Chapters; Draugen	
Relentless Software	Brighton	England	United Kingdom	Buzz!; Blue Toad Murder Files	
Re-Logic	Floyds Knobs	Indiana	United States	Terraria	
Renegade Kid	Austin	Texas	United States	Dementium: The Ward; Moon; Dementium II	
RocketWerkz	Auckland		New Zealand	Icarus (video game)	
Roll7	London	England	United Kingdom	OlliOlli; OlliOlli2: Welcome to Olliwood; Not a Hero	
Ronimo Games	Utrecht		Netherlands	de Blob; Swords & Soldiers; Awesomenauts	
Rovio Entertainment	Espoo		Finland	Angry Birds	
S2 Games	Rohnert Park	California	United States	Savage: The Battle for Newerth; Savage 2: A Tortured Soul; Heroes of Newerth	
Saber Interactive	Millburn	New Jersey	United States	Will Rock; TimeShift	
Sandlot Games	Bothell	Washington	United States	Cake Mania	
Santa Cruz Games	Santa Cruz	California	United States	Tomb Raider: Underworld; Godzilla Unleashed: Double Smash	
Schell Games	Pittsburgh	Pennsylvania	United States	I Expect You To Die	Developer and publisher
Scott Cawthon	Salado	Texas	United States	Five Nights at Freddy's series	Since 2021 only active as a publisher
Semi Secret Software	Austin	Texas	United States	Canabalt	
Simogo	Malmö		Sweden	Device 6; Year Walk; Beat Sneak Bandit; Bumpy Road	
Silver Creek Entertainment	Grants Pass	Oregon	United States	Soltrio Solitaire	
Ska Studios	Marcy	New York	United States	Survival Crisis Z; The Dishwasher: Dead Samurai; I MAED A GAM3 W1TH Z0MB1ES 1NIT!!!1; The Dishwasher: Vampire Smile; Charlie Murder; Salt and Sanctuary	
Skygoblin	Gothenburg		Sweden	The Journey Down	
Sokpop Collective	Utrecht	Utrecht	Netherlands		
Soldak Entertainment	Dallas	Texas	United States	Depths of Peril; Kivi's Underworld; Din's Curse	
Spiderweb Software	Seattle	Washington	United States	Exile series; Avernum series; Geneforge series; Nethergate	
Stardock	Plymouth	Michigan	United States	Galactic Civilizations series; Elemental series; The Political Machine series	
Stoic Studio	Austin	Texas	United States	The Banner Saga series	
Storm Impact	Glenview	Illinois	United States	TaskMaker	
Stormling Studios	Istanbul		Turkey	Darkness Within; Darkness Within: The Dark Lineage	formerly "Zoetrope Interactive"
Studio Pixel			Japan	Cave Story; Ikachan; Kero Blaster	
Studio Thunderhorse	Roseville	California	United States	Flynn: Son of Crimson	
Subatomic Studios	Boston	Massachusetts	United States	Fieldrunners	
Supergiant Games	San Francisco	California	United States	Bastion; Transistor; Pyre; Hades	
SuperVillain Studios	Santa Ana	California	United States	Dungeon Siege: Throne of Agony; Order Up!	
Tarsier Studios	Malmö		Sweden	Little Nightmares	
Tale of Tales	Ghent		Belgium	The Endless Forest; The Graveyard; The Path	
TaleWorlds Entertainment	Ankara		Turkey	Mount&Blade; Mount&Blade: Warband; Mount&Blade: With Fire & Sword	
Team Shanghai Alice	Ebina	Kanagawa	Japan	Touhou Project	
Telltale Games	San Rafael	California	United States	Sam & Max episodic series; The Walking Dead series; Tales from the Borderlands; The Wolf Among Us; Game of Thrones; Minecraft: Story Mode	
Terry Cavanagh	London	England	United Kingdom	VVVVVV; Super Hexagon; Dicey Dungeons	
thatgamecompany	Los Angeles	California	United States	flOw; Cloud; Flower; Journey	
Three Rings Design	San Francisco	California	United States	Yohoho! Puzzle Pirates; Bang! Howdy; Whirled; Spiral Knights	
Thunder Lotus Games	Montreal	Quebec	Canada	Jotun; Sundered; Spiritfarer; 33 Immortals	
Tiger Style	Austin	Texas	United States	Waking Mars; Spider: The Secret of Bryce Manor; Spider: Rite of the Shrouded Moon	
tinyBuild	Bothell	Washington	United States	No Time to Explain	Since 2016 only active as a publisher
Terri Vellmann			Brazil	Heavy Bullets	
Toby Fox	Boston	Massachusetts	United States	Undertale; Deltarune	
Torpex Games	Bellevue	Washington	United States	Schizoid	
Tomorrow Corporation			United States	Little Inferno; World of Goo	
Tribute Games	Montreal	Quebec	Canada	Wizorb; Mercenary Kings; Curses 'N Chaos	Developer and publisher
Trickster Arts	Brno		Czech Republic	Hero of Many; Hackers	
Uber Entertainment	Kirkland	Washington	United States	Planetary Annihilation; Monday Night Combat; Super Monday Night Combat	
Vectorpark	Brooklyn	New York	United States	Windosill; Metamorphabet	
Vlambeer	Utrecht		Netherlands	Super Crate Box; Serious Sam: The Random Encounter; Luftrausers; Nuclear Throne	
Wadjet Eye Games	New York City	New York	United States	The Shivah; Blackwell series; Gemini Rue; Shardlight	
WayForward Technologies, Inc.	Valencia	California	United States	Shantae series; Contra 4; A Boy and His Blob; Mighty Switch Force series; Double Dragon Neon; DuckTales Remastered	
Wolfire Games	Berkeley	California	United States	Black Shades; Lugaru: The Rabbit's Foot; Overgrowth	
XGen Studios	Edmonton	Alberta	Canada	Defend Your Castle; Super Motherload	
XMG Studio	Toronto	Ontario	Canada		
Xona Games	Yarmouth	Nova Scotia	Canada	Decimation X series; Score Rush series	
Yacht Club Games	Valencia	California	United States	Shovel Knight	Founded by former Wayforward director Sean Velasco
Young Horses	Chicago	Illinois	United States	Octodad; Octodad: Dadliest Catch; Bugsnax	
Zachtronics	Seattle	Washington	United States	Infiniminer; SpaceChem	
Zeekerss			United States	Lethal Company; Welcome To The Dark Place	
Zoink	Gothenburg		Sweden	PlayStation All-Stars Island; The Kore Gang	
Zoonami	Cambridge	England	United Kingdom	Zendoku; Bonsai Barber	
ZootFly	Ljubljana		Slovenia	First Battalion	

== See also ==
- Casual game
- Dojin soft
- Fangame
- Indie game
- List of video game developers
