= List of PC games (S) =

The following page is an alphabetical section from the list of PC games.

== S ==
Name	Developer	Publisher	Genre(s)	Operating system(s)	Date released
Sacred	Ascaron	Encore, Koch Media, Red Ant Enterprises	Action RPG	Microsoft Windows, Linux	19 March 2004
The Sacred Hero	SiMPLiSTiC	SiMPLiSTiC	RPG	Microsoft Windows, Linux	TBA
Saints Row	Volition	Deep Silver	Action-adventure	Microsoft Windows	23 August 2022
Saints Row 2	Volition, CD Projekt (Windows)	THQ	Action-adventure, open world	Microsoft Windows, Linux	5 January 2009
Saints Row: The Third	Volition	THQ	Action-adventure, open world	Microsoft Windows, Linux	15 November 2011
Saints Row: The Third Remastered	Volition	Deep Silver	Action-adventure, open world	Microsoft Windows	22 May 2020
Saints Row IV	Volition	Deep Silver, Spike Chunsoft	Action-adventure, open world	Microsoft Windows, Linux	20 August 2013
Saints Row: Gat out of Hell	High Voltage Software; Volition	Deep Silver	Action-adventure	Microsoft Windows, Linux	20 January 2015
Sands of Salzaar	Han-Squirrel Studio	XD	Action RPG, strategy, open world	Microsoft Windows	16 December 2021
Satisfactory	Coffee Stain Studios	Coffee Stain Publishing	Construction and management simulation	Microsoft Windows	19 March 2019
SCP – Containment Breach	Undertow Games	Undertow Games	Survival horror, Indie	Microsoft Windows	15 April 2012
SCP: Secret Laboratory	Northwood Studios	Northwood Studios	Survival horror, first-person shooter	Microsoft Windows	29 December 2017
Schedule I	TVGS (Tyler's Video Game Studio)	TVGS (Tyler's Video Game Studio)	Open world, simulation	Microsoft Windows	24 March 2025
Scrapland	Mercury Steam Entertainment	Deep Silver, Enlight Software	Action-adventure	Microsoft Windows	4 November 2004
Scribblenauts Unlimited	5th Cell	Warner Bros. Interactive Entertainment	Puzzle	Microsoft Windows, macOS	20 November 2012
Scribblenauts Unmasked: A DC Comics Adventure	5th Cell	Warner Bros. Interactive Entertainment	Puzzle	Microsoft Windows, macOS	24 September 2013
Scrolls	Mojang	Mojang	Tactical CCG	Microsoft Windows, macOS	11 November 2014
Secret of the Silver Blades	Strategic Simulations, Inc.	Strategic Simulations, Inc., Pony Canyon, Inc.	Fantasy, RPG	DOS, macOS, Commodore 64, Amiga, NEC PC-9801	20 October 1990
Secret Neighbor	Hologryph	tinyBuild	Social deduction, survival horror	Microsoft Windows	24 October 2019
The Secret World	Funcom	Electronic Arts	MMORPG	Microsoft Windows	3 July 2012
Sengoku	Paradox Development Studios	Paradox Interactive	Grand strategy	Microsoft Windows, macOS	13 September 2011
The Settlers	Blue Byte Software	Blue Byte Software	City-building game, Real-Time Strategy	Amiga, MS-DOS	30 June 1993
The Settlers II	Blue Byte Software	Blue Byte Software	City-building game, Real-Time Strategy	MS-DOS, Macintosh	17 April 1996
The Settlers III	Blue Byte Software	Blue Byte Software	City-building game, Real-Time Strategy	Microsoft Windows	20 November 1998
The Settlers IV	Blue Byte Software	Ubi Soft	City-building game, Real-Time Strategy	Microsoft Windows	15 February 2001
The Settlers: Heritage of Kings	Blue Byte Software	Ubi Soft	City-building game, Real-Time Strategy	Microsoft Windows	25 November 2004
The Settlers II (10th Anniversary)	Blue Byte Software	Ubi Soft	City-building game, Real-Time Strategy	Microsoft Windows	7 November 2006
The Settlers: Rise of an Empire	Blue Byte Software	Ubi Soft	City-building game, Real-Time Strategy	Microsoft Windows	28 November 2007
The Settlers: Awakening of Cultures	Blue Byte Software	Ubi Soft	City-building game, Real-Time Strategy	Microsoft Windows	28 August 2008
The Settlers 7: Paths to a Kingdom	Blue Byte Software	Ubi Soft	City-building game, Real-Time Strategy	Microsoft Windows, macOS	25 March 2010
Sex with Hitler	Romantic Room	Romantic Room	Shoot 'em up, Visual novel	Microsoft Windows	22 January 2022
Shadow of the Tomb Raider	Eidos Montréal	Square Enix	action-adventure	Microsoft Windows	14 September 2018
Shapez 2	tobspr Games	tobspr Games	Puzzle, factory simulation	Microsoft Windows, Linux, macOS	15 August 2024
The Ship	Outlight	Outlight	First-person shooter	Microsoft Windows	9 April 2007
Shogun: Total War	The Creative Assembly	Electronic Arts, Sega, Sold-Out Software	Turn-based strategy, real-time tactics	Microsoft Windows	13 June 2000
Showgunners	Artificer	Good Shepherd Entertainment	Turn-based tactics	Microsoft Windows	2 May 2023
ShootMania Storm	Nadeo	Ubisoft	First-person shooter	Microsoft Windows	10 April 2013
Sid Meier's Railroads!	Firaxis Games, Feral Interactive	2K Games, Feral Interactive	Business simulation	Microsoft Windows, macOS	17 October 2006
Silent Hunter	Aeon Electronic Entertainment	Strategic Simulations	Submarine simulator	DOS	1996
Silent Hunter II	Aeon Electronic Entertainment	Ubisoft	Submarine simulator	Microsoft Windows	6 November 2001
Silent Hunter III	Ubisoft Bucharest	Ubisoft	Submarine simulator	Microsoft Windows	15 March 2005
Silent Hunter 4: Wolves of the Pacific	Ubisoft Bucharest	Ubisoft	Submarine simulator	Microsoft Windows	20 March 2007
Silent Hunter 5: Battle of the Atlantic	Ubisoft Bucharest	Ubisoft	Submarine simulator	Microsoft Windows	2 March 2010
Silkroad Online	Joymax	Joymax, Yahoo!	MMORPG	Microsoft Windows	2004
Silver	Spiral House	Infogrames	Action RPG	Microsoft Windows	1999
SimCity	Maxis	Electronic Arts	City-building	Microsoft Windows, macOS	5 March 2013
SimCity 2000	Maxis	Electronic Arts	City-building	Microsoft Windows, Various	1994
SimCity 3000	Maxis	Electronic Arts	City-building	Microsoft Windows, Linux, macOS	31 January 1999
SimCity 4	Maxis	Electronic Arts, Aspyr Media	City-building	Microsoft Windows, macOS	14 January 2003
SimCity Societies	Tilted Mill Entertainment	Electronic Arts	City-building	Microsoft Windows	13 November 2007
The Sims	Edge of Reality, Maxis	Electronic Arts	Life simulation	Microsoft Windows, Mac OS, OS X, Linux	11 February 2000
The Sims 2	Maxis	Electronic Arts	Life simulation	Microsoft Windows, macOS	14 September 2004
The Sims 2: University	Maxis	Electronic Arts	Life simulation	Microsoft Windows, macOS	11 March 2005
The Sims 2: Nightlife	Maxis	Electronic Arts	Life simulation	Microsoft Windows, macOS	13 September 2005
The Sims 2: Open for Business	Maxis	Electronic Arts	Life simulation	Microsoft Windows, macOS	6 March 2006
The Sims 2: Seasons	Maxis	Electronic Arts	Life simulation	Microsoft Windows, macOS	23 February 2007
The Sims 2: Bon Voyage	Maxis	Electronic Arts	Life simulation	Microsoft Windows, macOS	4 September 2007
The Sims 2: FreeTime	Maxis	Electronic Arts	Life simulation	Microsoft Windows, macOS	22 February 2008
The Sims 2: Apartment Life	Maxis	Electronic Arts	Life simulation	Microsoft Windows, macOS	25 August 2008
The Sims: Livin' Large	Maxis	Electronic Arts, Aspyr	Life simulation	Microsoft Windows, macOS	27 August 2000
The Sims: House Party	Maxis	Electronic Arts	Life simulation	Microsoft Windows, macOS	2 April 2001
The Sims: Hot Date	Maxis	Electronic Arts	Life simulation	Microsoft Windows, macOS	14 November 2001
The Sims: Unleashed	Maxis	Electronic Arts	Life simulation	Microsoft Windows, macOS	7 January 2002
The Sims: Vacation	Maxis	Electronic Arts	Life simulation	Microsoft Windows, macOS	28 March 2002
The Sims: Superstar	Maxis	Electronic Arts	Life simulation	Microsoft Windows, macOS	13 May 2003
The Sims: Makin' Magic	Maxis	Electronic Arts	Life simulation	Microsoft Windows, macOS	29 October 2003
The Sims 3	Maxis	Electronic Arts	Life simulation	Microsoft Windows, macOS	2 June 2009
The Sims 3: Late Night	Maxis	Electronic Arts	Life simulation	Microsoft Windows, macOS	26 October 2010
The Sims 3: Generations	Maxis	Electronic Arts	Life simulation	Microsoft Windows, macOS	31 May 2011
The Sims 3: Showtime	Maxis	Electronic Arts	Life simulation	Microsoft Windows, macOS	6 March 2012
The Sims 3: Supernatural	Maxis	Electronic Arts	Life simulation	Microsoft Windows, macOS	4 September 2012
The Sims 3: Seasons	Maxis	Electronic Arts	Life simulation	Microsoft Windows, macOS	13 November 2012
The Sims 3: University Life	Maxis	Electronic Arts	Life simulation	Microsoft Windows, macOS	5 March 2013
The Sims 3: Island Paradise	Maxis	Electronic Arts	Life simulation	Microsoft Windows, macOS	25 June 2013
The Sims 3: Into the Future	Maxis	Electronic Arts	Life simulation	Microsoft Windows, macOS	22 October 2013
Sins of a Solar Empire	Ironclad Games	Stardock	RTS	Microsoft Windows	2008
Skate.	Full Circle	Electronic Arts	Sports, open world, Free-to-play	Microsoft Windows	16 September 2025
Sky: Children of the Light	thatgamecompany	thatgamecompany	Adventure, social simulation	Microsoft Windows	15 April 2022
Slime Rancher	Monomi Park	Monomi Park	Simulation, first-person shooter	Microsoft Windows, Linux, macOS	1 August 2017
Slime Rancher 2	Monomi Park	Monomi Park	Simulation	Microsoft Windows	22 September 2022
Slitterhead	Bokeh Game Studio	Bokeh Game Studio	Action-adventure	Microsoft Windows	8 November 2024
Sleeping Dogs	United Front Games	Square Enix	Action-adventure	Microsoft Windows	14 September 2012
Smite	Hi-Rez Studios	Hi-Rez Studios	MOBA	Microsoft Windows	25 March 2014
Snake Core	Orangepixel	Orangepixel, HandyGames	Action, arcade, Indie	Microsoft Windows	21 April 2020
Snow	Poppermost Productions	Poppermost Productions	Sports, open world	Microsoft Windows	10 September 2019
SnowRunner	Saber Interactive	Focus Entertainment	Simulation, off-road racing	Microsoft Windows	28 April 2020
Sniper Elite	Rebellion Developments	Namco	Tactical shooter	Microsoft Windows	26 September 2005
Sniper Elite V2	Rebellion Developments	505 Games	Tactical shooter	Microsoft Windows, Linux, macOS	1 May 2012
Sniper Elite III	Rebellion Developments	505 Games	Tactical shooter	Microsoft Windows	1 July 2014
Sniper Elite 4	Rebellion Developments	Rebellion Developments	Tactical shooter	Microsoft Windows, Linux, macOS	14 February 2017
Sniper Elite VR	Rebellion Developments	Rebellion Developments	Tactical shooter, VR	Microsoft Windows	8 July 2021
Sniper Elite 5	Rebellion Developments	Rebellion Developments	Tactical shooter	Microsoft Windows	26 May 2022
Sniper Elite: Resistance	Rebellion Developments	Rebellion Developments	Tactical shooter	Microsoft Windows	30 January 2025
Sonic the Hedgehog (1991)	Sonic Team	Sega	Platform	Microsoft Windows	26 October 2010
Sonic the Hedgehog 3	Sega Technical Institute	Sega	Platform	Microsoft Windows	14 February 1997
Sonic 3D Blast	Traveller's Tales; Sonic Team	Sega	Platform	Microsoft Windows	25 September 1997
Sonic the Hedgehog 4: Episode I	Dimps; Sonic Team	Sega	Platform	Microsoft Windows	19 January 2012
Sonic the Hedgehog 4: Episode II	Dimps; Sonic Team	Sega	Platform	Microsoft Windows	15 May 2012
Sonic Adventure	Sonic Team	Sega	Platform; Action-adventure	Microsoft Windows	18 December 2003
Sonic Adventure 2	Sonic Team USA	Sega	Platform; Action-adventure; Third-person shooter	Microsoft Windows	10 November 2012
Sonic & Sega All-Stars Racing	Sumo Digital	Sega	Kart racing game	Microsoft Windows, Mac OS X	26 February 2010
Sonic & All-Stars Racing Transformed	Sumo Digital	Sega	Racing	Microsoft Windows	31 January 2013
Sonic CD	Sega	Sega	Platform	Microsoft Windows	9 August 1996
Sonic Colors: Ultimate	Sonic Team	Sega	Platform	Microsoft Windows	7 September 2021
Sonic Dash	Hardlight	Sega	Endless runner	Microsoft	3 December 2014
Sonic Forces	Sonic Team	Sega	Platform	Microsoft Windows	7 November 2017
Sonic Frontiers	Sonic Team	Sega	Platform; Action-adventure	Microsoft Windows	8 November 2022
Sonic Heroes	Sonic Team USA	Sega	platform	Microsoft Windows	5 December 2003
Sonic & Knuckles Collection	Sega PC	Sega	platform, compilation	Microsoft Windows	1997
Sonic Lost World	Sega	Sega	platform	Microsoft Windows	2 November 2015
Sonic Mania	Christian Whitehead; PagodaWest Games; Headcannon	Sega	Platform	Microsoft Windows	29 August 2017
Sonic Mania Plus	Christian Whitehead; Hyperkinetic Studios	Sega	Platform	Microsoft Windows	17 July 2018
Sonic Mega Collection Plus	Sonic Team	Sega	Various	Microsoft Windows	6 March 2007
Sonic Origins	Sonic Team	Sega	Platform	Microsoft Windows	23 June 2022
Sonic Origins Plus	Sonic Team	Sega	Platform	Microsoft Windows	23 June 2023
Sonic PC Collection	Sonic Team	Sega	Compilation	Microsoft Windows	1 October 2009
Sonic R	Traveller's Tales; Sonic Team	Sega	Racing	Microsoft Windows	11 November 1998
Sonic Racing: CrossWorlds	Sega AM3 R&D Division	Sega	Racing	Microsoft Windows	2025
Sonic Riders	Sonic Team; Now Production	Sega	Racing	Microsoft Windows	16 November 2006
Sonic Rumble	Sonic Team; Rovio Entertainment	Sega	Party; Battle Royale	Microsoft Windows	2025 (Q1)
Sonic's Schoolhouse	BAP Interactive, Orion Interactive	Sega	Educational game	Microsoft Windows	18 October 1996
Sonic Superstars	Arzest; Sonic Team	Sega	Platform	Microsoft Windows	17 October 2023
Sonic X Shadow Generations	Sonic Team	Sega	Platform	Microsoft Windows	25 October 2024
Sons of the Forest	Endnight Games	Endnight Games	Survival horror, open world	Microsoft Windows	23 February 2023
South Park: The Stick of Truth	Obsidian Entertainment	Ubisoft	Role-playing	Microsoft Windows, Linux, macOS	4 March 2014
South Park: The Fractured but Whole	Ubisoft San Francisco	Ubisoft	Role-playing	Microsoft Windows	17 October 2017
Space Engineers	Keen Software House	Keen Software House	Sandbox, simulation	Microsoft Windows	23 October 2013
Space Station 13	SS13 Development Team	SS13 Development Team	MMORPG	Microsoft Windows	16 February 2003
SpaceChem	Zachtronics Industries	Zachtronics Industries	Puzzle	Microsoft Windows, Linux, macOS	1 January 2011
Spellbreak	Proletariat Inc.	Proletariat Inc.	Battle royale, action	Microsoft Windows	3 September 2020
Marvel's Spider-Man Remastered	Insomniac Games	Sony Interactive Entertainment	Action-adventure	Microsoft Windows	12 August 2022
Marvel's Spider-Man: Miles Morales	Insomniac Games	Sony Interactive Entertainment	Action-adventure	Microsoft Windows	18 November 2022
Marvel's Spider-Man 2	Insomniac Games	Sony Interactive Entertainment	Action-adventure	Microsoft Windows	30 January 2025
Spore	Maxis	Electronic Arts	Life simulation	Microsoft Windows	7 September 2008
Spore Galactic Adventures	Maxis	Electronic Arts	Life simulation	Microsoft Windows	23 June 2009
Spyro Reignited Trilogy	Toys for Bob	Activision	Platformer	Microsoft Windows	3 September 2019
S.T.A.L.K.E.R.: Shadow of Chernobyl	GSC Game World	THQ	First-person shooter	Microsoft Windows	20 March 2007
S.T.A.L.K.E.R.: Clear Sky	GSC Game World	Deep Silver	First-person shooter	Microsoft Windows	15 September 2008
S.T.A.L.K.E.R.: Call of Pripyat	GSC Game World	Viva Media	First-person shooter	Microsoft Windows	2 February 2010
S.T.A.L.K.E.R. 2: Heart of Chornobyl	GSC Game World	GSC Game World	First-person shooter; Survival horror	Microsoft Windows	20 November 2024
The Stanley Parable	Galactic Cafe	Galactic Cafe	Interactive fiction	Microsoft Windows, Linux, macOS	17 October 2013
Star Citizen	Cloud Imperium Games Corporation	Cloud Imperium Games Corporation	Space trading and combat simulator, first-person shooter	Microsoft Windows, Linux	TBA
Star Trek Online	Cryptic Studios	Perfect World Entertainment	MMORPG	Microsoft Windows, macOS	2 February 2010
Star Wars: Empire At War	Petroglyph Games	LucasArts	Real-time strategy	Microsoft Windows, macOS	16 February 2006
Star Wars Galaxies	Sony Online Entertainment	Electronic Arts, LucasArts	MMORPG	Microsoft Windows	17 February 2006
Star Wars Jedi: Fallen Order	Respawn Entertainment	Electronic Arts	Action-adventure	Microsoft Windows	15 November 2019
Star Wars Jedi: Survivor	Respawn Entertainment	Electronic Arts	Action-adventure	Microsoft Windows	28 April 2023
Star Wars: Knights of the Old Republic	BioWare	LucasArts	RPG	Microsoft Windows, macOS	19 November 2003
Star Wars: Knights of the Old Republic II – The Sith Lords	Obsidian Entertainment	LucasArts	RPG	Microsoft Windows, Linux, macOS	8 February 2005
Star Wars: Republic Commando	LucasArts, Magellan Interactive	THQ Wireless	Tactical shooter, first-person shooter	Xbox, Microsoft Windows	17 February 2005
Star Wars: The Old Republic	BioWare	Electronic Arts, LucasArts	MMORPG	Microsoft Windows	20 December 2011
Star Wars: TIE Fighter	Lucasarts	Lucasarts	Flight simulation	DOS, Windows 9x, Linux, macOS	1 July 1994
Star Wars: X-Wing	Lucasarts	Lucasarts	Flight simulation	DOS, macOS	1 February 1993
StarCraft	Blizzard Entertainment	Blizzard Entertainment	RTS	Microsoft Windows, macOS	31 March 1998
StarCraft: Brood War	Blizzard Entertainment, Saffire	Blizzard Entertainment	RTS	Microsoft Windows, macOS	30 November 1998
StarCraft II: Wings of Liberty	Blizzard Entertainment	Blizzard Entertainment	RTS	Microsoft Windows, macOS	27 July 2010
StarCraft II: Heart of the Swarm	Blizzard Entertainment	Blizzard Entertainment	RTS	Microsoft Windows, macOS	12 March 2013
StarCraft II: Legacy of the Void	Blizzard Entertainment	Blizzard Entertainment	RTS	Microsoft Windows, macOS	10 November 2015
Starbound	Chucklefish	Chucklefish	Action-adventure, sandbox	Microsoft Windows, OS X, Linux	22 July 2016
Stardew Valley	Eric Barone	ChuckleFish, ConcernedApe	Farming simulation, RPG	Microsoft Windows, OS X, Linux	February 26, 2016
StarDrive	Zero Sum Games	Iceberg Interactive	4X, strategy	Microsoft Windows	26 April 2013
Starsector	Fractal Softworks	Fractal Softworks	4X, strategy, action RPG	Microsoft Windows, Linux, macOS	26 April 2013
Starsiege: Tribes	Dynamix	Sierra On-Line	First-person shooter	Microsoft Windows	23 December 1998
State of Decay	Undead Labs	Microsoft Studios	Stealth, survival horror, RPG, third-person shooter, simulation	Microsoft Windows	5 November 2013
SteamWorld Build	The Station	Thunderful	City-building	Microsoft Windows	1 December 2023
SteamWorld Dig	Image & Form	Image & Form	Platformer, action-adventure	Microsoft Windows, Linux, macOS	8 August 2013
SteamWorld Dig 2	Image & Form	Image & Form	Platformer, action-adventure	Microsoft Windows, Linux, macOS	21 September 2017
SteamWorld Heist	Image & Form	Image & Form	Turn-based tactics, side-scrolling shooter	Microsoft Windows, Linux, macOS	8 April 2016
SteamWorld Heist II	Thunderful	Thunderful	Turn-based tactics, side-scrolling shooter	Microsoft Windows	8 August 2024
SteamWorld Quest: Hand of Gilgamech	Image & Form	Thunderful	Card-based RPG	Microsoft Windows	31 May 2020
Stellar Monarch	Silver Lemur Games	Silver Lemur Games	4X, strategy	Microsoft Windows	5 December 2016
Steep	Ubisoft Annecy	Ubisoft	Sports, open world	Microsoft Windows	2 December 2016
The Sting!	Neo Software	JoWooD Entertainment	Strategy, adventure	Microsoft Windows	1 July 2001
Stranded Deep	Beam Team Games	Beam Team Games	Survival, open world	Microsoft Windows, Linux, macOS	23 January 2015
Stray	BlueTwelve Studio	Annapurna Interactive	Adventure, puzzle	Microsoft Windows	19 July 2022
Street Racing Syndicate	Eutechnyx	Namco	Racing	Windows	4 October 2005
Stronghold	Firefly Studios, MacSoft	Take 2 Interactive, God Games	RTS	Microsoft Windows, macOS	19 October 2001
Stronghold: Crusader	Firefly Studios	Take 2 Interactive, God Games	RTS	Microsoft Windows	31 July 2002
Stronghold 2	Firefly Studios	2K Games	RTS	Microsoft Windows	18 April 2005
Stronghold: Crusader Extreme	Firefly Studios	Gamecock Media Group	RTS	Microsoft Windows	27 May 2008
Stronghold 3	Firefly Studios	7Sixty Games	RTS	Microsoft Windows, Linux, macOS	25 October 2011
Stronghold Legends	Firefly Studios	2K Games	RTS	Microsoft Windows	13 October 2006
Stronghold Kingdoms	Firefly Studios	Firefly Studios	RTS	Microsoft Windows	17 October 2012
Subnautica	Unknown Worlds Entertainment	Unknown Worlds Entertainment	Action-adventure, survival horror	Microsoft Windows, macOS	16 December 2014
Subnautica 2	Unknown Worlds Entertainment	Unknown Worlds Entertainment	Action-adventure, survival horror	Microsoft Windows, macOS	14 May 2026
Subnautica: Below Zero	Unknown Worlds Entertainment	Unknown Worlds Entertainment	Action-adventure, survival horror	Microsoft Windows, macOS	14 May 2021
Sunset Overdrive	Insomniac Games	Microsoft Studios	Action-adventure, third-person shooter	Microsoft Windows	16 November 2018
Super Animal Royale	Muse Games	Muse Games	Battle royale	Microsoft Windows, Linux, macOS	1 March 2022
Super Auto Pets	Team Wood Games	Team Wood Games	Auto battler	Microsoft Windows, macOS	7 October 2021
Super Meat Boy	Team Meat	Team Meat	Platformer	Microsoft Windows, Linux, macOS	5 April 2011
Super Meat Boy Forever	Team Meat	Team Meat	Platformer, endless runner	Microsoft Windows, Linux, macOS	23 December 2020
Super Meat Boy 3D	Team Meat	Team Meat	Platformer	Microsoft Windows	TBA
SUPERHOT	SUPERHOT team	SUPERHOT team	First-person shooter	Microsoft Windows, Linux, macOS	25 February 2016
Superliminal	Pillow Castle Games	Pillow Castle Games	Puzzle	Microsoft Windows, Linux, macOS	12 November 2019
Supraland	Supra Games	Supra Games	Action-adventure, puzzle	Microsoft Windows	5 April 2019
Supreme Commander	Gas Powered Games	THQ	RTS	Microsoft Windows	16 February 2007
Surf's Up	Ubisoft Montreal, Ubisoft Quebec, Totally Games	Ubisoft, Sony Computer Entertainment America	Sports	Mac OS X, Microsoft Windows	30 May 2007
SWAT 3: Close Quarters Battle	Sierra Northwest	Sierra Entertainment	First-person shooter, tactical shooter	Microsoft Windows	23 November 1999
SWAT 4	Irrational Games	Vivendi Universal Games, Sierra Entertainment	First-person shooter, tactical shooter	Microsoft Windows, macOS	5 April 2005
Sword of the Sea	Giant Squid	Giant Squid	Adventure, exploration	Microsoft Windows	19 August 2025
Syberia	Microids	Microids	Adventure, point-and-click	Microsoft Windows, macOS	7 June 2002
Syberia II	Microids	Microids	Adventure, point-and-click	Microsoft Windows, macOS	26 March 2004
Syberia 3	Microids	Microids	Adventure, point-and-click	Microsoft Windows	20 April 2017
Syberia: The World Before	Microids	Microids	Adventure, point-and-click	Microsoft Windows	10 December 2021
System Shock	Looking Glass Studios	Origin Systems	Action-adventure, RPG	DOS, macOS	22 October 1994
System Shock 2	Irrational Games, Looking Glass Studios	Electronic Arts	Action RPG, survival horror	Microsoft Windows, Linux, macOS	11 August 1999
