= Stronghold (series) =

Video game series

- Genre: Real-time strategy
- Developer: Firefly Studios
- Publishers: Gathering of Developers; 2K; Firefly Studios
- First release: Stronghold; 2001
- Latest release: Stronghold: Warlords; 2021

Stronghold is a series of real-time strategy video games created and owned by British developer Firefly Studios. Set in medieval times, the games are known for their detailed graphics and their deep and complex gameplay. Players take on the role of a lord or lady who must build and defend their castle, as well as conquer their enemies.

== Background ==
Release timeline
2001	Stronghold
2002	Stronghold Crusader
2003–2004
2005	Stronghold 2
2006	Stronghold Legends
2007–2010
2011	Stronghold 3
2012	Stronghold Kingdoms
2013
2014	Stronghold Crusader II
2015–2020
2021	Stronghold Warlords
2022
2023	Stronghold: Definitive Edition
2024	Stronghold Castles
2025	Stronghold Crusader: Definitive Edition
2026	Stronghold 4

The series consists of three main titles built on the Vision Engine, each with their own unique and drastically different game engine, as well as a number of expansions or spin-offs built on the same game engine.

The first main title Stronghold (2001) was built on a 2D isometric game engine, which was used to build three additional spin-offs: Crusader (2002), Crusader Extreme (2008), and Kingdoms (2012). Like Age of Empires II, The game was later released as an HD remaster (2013) and a definitive edition (2023).

The second main title Stronghold 2 (2005) was released on an ambitious yet lackluster and buggy 3D engine, followed by numerous patches to fix the bugs, culminating in Stronghold 2 Deluxe which was a fully stable and patched version released six months after the main title. Soon after, a spin-off titled Stronghold Legends (2006) was released, adding more content to the title.

The third main title Stronghold 3 (2011) was released by a new parent company based on a new game engine. Years later, Stronghold Crusader II (2014) was released based on this game engine as a story sequel to Crusader (2002), and Stronghold: Warlords (2021) was released as a separate spin-off. The franchise is owned by Devolver Digital through their acquisition of Firefly Studios.

== Games ==
=== Stronghold ===
Stronghold, was released in 2001. The game is set in medieval England and follows the story of a young lord who must unite the country after the death of the king. The player must gather resources, construct fortifications, and train an army to defeat their enemies. The game features a single-player campaign, a multiplayer mode, and a variety of skirmish maps.

=== Stronghold: Crusader ===
The second installment, Stronghold: Crusader, was released in September 2002. The gameplay is similar to the first game, but with enhanced RTS elements and with all maps and missions set entirely in the Middle East during the Middle Ages. The focus was radically influenced by fortification and siege technologies developed during the Crusades. The entire campaign, as well as the "Conquest Trail" game mode, takes place during the Third Crusade.

Unlike the original Stronghold, however, there are four separate, linear campaigns. The game does take history into effect: Saladin and Richard I of England are present as the game's AI characters for the player to side with or against. In addition, the player is allowed to play either as an Arabic lord or as a European king with little difference between the two options except which units the player begins with.

A combination pack of Stronghold and Stronghold: Crusader, called Stronghold Warchest, was later released with all patches applied, new maps, and a new campaign trail and AI characters in Crusader.

=== Stronghold 2 ===
The direct sequel to the first game and the third overall game in the series, Stronghold 2, was released in April 2005. The game engine was enhanced to provide fully 3D graphics. Other changes include new military and peace campaigns and the addition of crime and punishment. It also included many new characters and changed the types of walls and towers that can be added to a castle. However, the series' unique real-time map editor was replaced with a still-life one.

Upon its release, many players were outraged by the game's frequent crashes, lag (even while playing offline on a computer with exceptional hardware), and overall buggy nature. Firefly Studios paid much attention to the gaming community's complaints, and promised fixes in later patches. The majority of complaints stopped with patch 1.2. Patch 1.3.1, released on October 28, 2005, brought a "Conquest Trail" to the game, similar to that of Stronghold: Crusader. Stronghold 2 Deluxe was later released, containing all of the patches and new content.

Critically, Stronghold 2 received generally mixed reviews, with criticism directed at the bugs present in the initial release and the gameplay. To promote Stronghold 2, a ten-level Flash game was created, called Castle Attack 2. The aim of the game was to balance building a castle and defending it.

=== Stronghold Legends ===
Stronghold Legends is a Stronghold 2 spin-off that contains 24 missions spanning three different campaigns: King Arthur and his Knights of the Round Table, Count Vlad Dracul, and Siegfried of Germany. This sequel contains a new feature that allows the player to control human and mythical armies. Creatures like dragons and witches can be created in Stronghold Legends.

=== Stronghold 3 ===
Stronghold 3 is a 2011 real-time strategy game, featuring more realistic shadows, landscapes, units, buildings, day/night cycle, and weather, based on a new 3D game engine, allowing the player to construct walls and buildings at non-parallel angles. It is a direct sequel to Stronghold and Stronghold 2. Unlike previous games in the series, which were published by Take-Two Interactive, the game was published by SouthPeak Games, the new parent company of Gamecock Media Group, publisher of Stronghold Crusader Extreme.

=== Stronghold Kingdoms ===
Stronghold Kingdoms is the first MMO-RTS game in the Stronghold series. In this free-to-play game, players can anticipate a world filled with elements from the first game of the series.

=== Stronghold Crusader II ===
Released on 23 September 2014, Stronghold Crusader II is built on the Stronghold 3 game engine, while story-wise, it is a sequel to Stronghold: Crusader. The game is set in the Middle East during the Third Crusade, featuring some new units, maps, game modes, gameplay mechanics, AI improvements, and a refined and enhanced multiplayer experience. Game modes include both a Crusader and Arabic historical single-player campaign, skirmish mode, multiplayer, and a co-op mode.

=== Stronghold: Warlords ===
Stronghold: Warlords is a new title set in ancient China, based on a highly improved engine, in terms of coloring, style, unit details and building architecture. A strong focus is placed on lighting. Compared to previous titles, the game places a much heavier weight on aesthetics and cosmetics, as well as their positive or negative effect on the population, which reflects in the gameplay. The game was revealed during E3 2019 and was originally planned to be released on September 29, 2020, but it was delayed to January 26, 2021, due to the COVID-19 pandemic. Due to further issues regarding multiplayer, the release date was moved back another six weeks, and was finally released on March 9, 2021.

=== Stronghold: Definitive Edition ===
On 7 November 2023, Stronghold: Definitive Edition was released. It upgraded and modernized the original Stronghold game from 2001. Two additional DLCs were eventually released for the game as well. Roughly a year later, it was reported that the game sold over 500,000 copies.

=== Stronghold Castles ===
In late 2024, Firefly Studios released Stronghold Castles for iOS and Android platforms. It became the first mobile-oriented title in the Stronghold franchise. The game was ultimately unsuccessful as it was later reported that the game had only generated a few thousand dollars in revenue.

=== Stronghold Crusader: Definitive Edition ===
In January 2025, Firefly announced Stronghold Crusader: Definitive Edition, essentially a remaster of the original Stronghold: Crusader from 2002. In addition to updated graphics and interface tweaks, new additions were announced as well, such as new AI characters, additional co-op modes for multiplayer, larger map sizes, and new in-game units. It was released on 15 July 2025.

=== Stronghold 4 ===
On 24 June 2022, Firefly Studios announced the development of a new Stronghold title based on Unreal Engine 5. On 7 June 2026, the game was announced under the title Stronghold 4. The game is scheduled to release on Microsoft Windows via Steam in 2026. A demo of the game launched on 23 June the same year.
