= Stronghold 4 =

- Cover
- Developer: Firefly Studios
- Publisher: Firefly Studios
- Composer: Robert L. Euvino
- Series: Stronghold
- Engine: Unreal Engine 5
- Platform: Windows
- Release: 20 April 2027 (early access)
- Genres: Real-time strategy, city-building
- Modes: Single-player, multiplayer

Stronghold 4 is an upcoming real-time strategy and city-building game developed by Firefly Studios. It is the fourth main entry in the Stronghold series and serves as a prequel to the original Stronghold. Set in medieval England, the game focuses on castle construction, economic management, and siege warfare. The game is set to be released through early access in April 2027.

== Gameplay ==
Stronghold 4 builds on the series' classic castle construction and siege warfare while introducing expanded systems and a more dynamic medieval world. Weather effects such as snow can reduce crop production, while heavy rain affects archers.

New population events and management mechanics influence settlement stability, while larger maps, expanded castle-building options, defensive structures, traps, tunnel systems, and improved siege mechanics provide greater variety in construction and warfare. The game also reintroduces the honour system, allowing players to increase their rank and unlock new buildings and military units through kingdom development. Expanded skirmish battles allow players to compete against up to eight AI opponents.

== Plot ==
The game follows Penryn of Wethel, a humble shepherd whose life changes after he is drawn into conflict. Set before the events of the original Stronghold, the story follows his journey as he leads his forces in search of glory and knighthood. The game features performances from Ben Starr, Samantha Béart, Walles Hamonde, and Harry McEntire, alongside new and returning characters.

== Development ==
Development of Stronghold 4 began with Firefly Studios creating a new entry using Unreal Engine 5 in 2022. A year later, marketing director at Firefly Studios, Nick Tannahill, stated that the project would serve as a foundation for the future of the Stronghold series, with a focus on returning to the franchise's core elements of castle building, economy, and character-driven storytelling.

The development of Stronghold 4 followed the success of the remastered editions of previous games in the series which helped revive interest in the franchise, encouraging Firefly Studios to return to developing a new mainline entry.

== Release ==
Stronghold 4 was officially announced on 7 June 2026. A playable demo was released on 23 June 2026, featuring two missions.

The game is planned to enter early access in 2026 on PC via Steam. The early access release will include a 22-mission story campaign, Skirmish Trail, Free Build mode, and Custom Skirmish battles against AI opponents. Online multiplayer, an economic campaign, and a co-operative trail are planned to be added later during development. The early access release was scheduled for 7 December 2026, and an updated demo was made available on 8 October. Early access was subsequently postponed to 20 April 2027.
