= SH3 =

SH3 or SH-3 may refer to:

- SH3 domain, a protein structural domain thought to be involved in the formation of productive protein-protein binding interactions
- Renesas SH-3, a member of the SuperH microprocessor family, used in mobile and hand-held devices
- Silent Hill 3, the third installment in the Silent Hill survival horror video game series published by Konami
- Shadow Hearts: From The New World, the third game in the Shadow Hearts series.
- Silent Hunter III, a submarine simulation developed and published by Ubisoft.
- State Highway 3, a common highway name in many countries
- Sikorsky SH-3 Sea King, also known as "Sikorsky S-61", a military helicopter produced by the United States
- Stronghold 3 a medieval castle-building simulation game from Firefly Studios. released on September 30, 2011.
- The sulfur analogue of hydronium (H_{3}S^{+})
