= Samuel R. Browd =

Samuel R. Browd, M.D., Ph.D., FACS, FAANS, FAAP

Samuel R. Browd is an American pediatric neurosurgeon, academic physician, serial entrepreneur and business executive. He is a professor of neurological surgery at the University of Washington and an attending neurosurgeon at Seattle Children's Hospital. His research includes pediatric neurosurgery, neuroengineering, surgical visualization technologies and development of technologies for brain-computer-interface (BCI).

== Early life and education ==
Browd completed a combined M.D. and Ph.D. through the Medical Scientist Training Program in 2000 at the University of Florida, focusing on neuroplasticity and learning. In 2007, he completed a seven-year neurosurgery residency at the University of Utah, followed by a pediatric neurosurgery fellowship at the University of Washington and Seattle Children's Hospital in 2007.

== Academic and clinical career ==
Browd joined the University of Washington faculty in 2007, where he is a professor of Neurological Surgery with adjunct appointments in bioengineering and sports medicine. At Seattle Children's Hospital, he is an attending neurosurgeon and directs the Hydrocephalus and Sports Concussion Programs. In 2026, Browd began leading medical device innovation at Seattle Children’s Institute for Pediatric Innovation. He currently serves as the vice-chair for AI and Innovation in the Department of Neurological Surgery at the University of Washington. In 2025, Browd and Dr. Daniel Donoho founded the Foundation for Digital Neurosurgery focused on AI, computer vision and robotics in neurological surgery. He was preciously director of The Sports Institute at UW Medicine from 2018 to 2025, where his work included interdisciplinary research, concussion prevention and youth sports safety.

Browd has been involved in the founding of medical technology companies focused on neurosurgical devices, surgical imaging, and digital therapeutics. He co-founded VICIS (2013–2020), a helmet-technology company that developed football helmets designed to reduce head-impact forces. Products developed by the company were included in TIME magazine's annual lists of best inventions in 2017, 2019, and 2021.

Browd co-founded Proprio in 2016, a medical imaging company developing surgical visualization systems.

In 2022, Browd co-founded DeepWell Digital Therapeutics alongside Mike Wilson and Ryan Douglas. The company develops video game-based biofeedback tools. In 2024, DeepWell received FDA 510(k) clearance for a software development kit indicated for stress reduction and as an adjunctive treatment for hypertension. Browd also co-founded Neufluent in 2022, a medical device venture studio focused on neuroscience devices and technologies.

Browd is listed as an inventor on U.S. and international patents covering neurosurgical implants, drainage systems, and surgical visualization technologies. Some have been licensed through the University of Washington's CoMotion innovation program.

Awards

- Innovator of the Year, Congress of Neurological Surgeons (2021).
- Inventor of the Year, University of Washington CoMotion (2016).
- TIME Best/Top Inventions lists for VICIS helmets (2017, 2019, 2021).
- TIME Best Inventions for Proprio Paradigm

== Professional activities ==
Browd is a Fellow of the American College of Surgeons and the American Academy of Pediatrics. He serves on committees of the Neurosurgery Research & Education Foundation (NREF). He has served as an unaffiliated neurological consultant to the National Football League and as an independent neurological consultant to the Seattle Seahawks.
