= Space colony =

Space colony may refer to:

- Space colonization, the establishment of any colony outside the planet Earth
- Space settlement, a free-floating extraterrestrial settlement, set up as a colony specifically

== Fiction ==
- Space Colony (video game), a real-time strategy video game.
- Colony in Space, a season 8 serial from Doctor Who
