= Minami Lane =

2024 video game

- Programmer: Dorian Signargout
- Artist: Doriane Randria
- Composer: Zakku
- Engine: Unity
- Platforms: Windows macOS; Nintendo Switch; Xbox One; Xbox Series X/S; PlayStation 4 PlayStation 5
- Release: Windows; 28 February 2024 macOS; 12 March 2024; Nintendo Switch; 29 August 2024; Xbox One, Xbox Series X/S, PlayStation 4, PlayStation 5; 9 July 2025
- Genre: Management video game
- Mode: Single-player

Minami Lane is a 2024 management video game created by Dorian "doot" Signargout and Doriane "blibloop" Randria. The game tasks the player managing a street, where they can build various shops, buildings, and parks to complete missions. There is also a sandbox mode. It was released for Windows, macOS, Nintendo Switch, Xbox One, Xbox Series X/S, PlayStation 4, and PlayStation 5 platforms. The PC version received favourable reviews from critics, while the Xbox Series X/S received mixed reception. The game's art style has been lauded, while the short length has been criticised.

== Gameplay ==
Minami Lane blends casual management and strategy genres in which the player manages and designs a street. It also includes cosy and city-building elements. Minami Lane takes place on a single street. The game features two gamemodes, one that features missions and the other that features a sandbox mode.

In the mission mode, the player is met with objectives and must complete tasks within a single day. Some of the tasks include building a boba shop, obtaining 15 villagers, and obtaining a 75% satisfaction rate from villagers. Villagers will occasionally give thoughts on the development of the street, which the player can save to improve the street and its buildings. The player can also build ramen shops, houses, and parks. They also have the ability to customise menus and prices of items in shops, while they can also upgrade buildings. During the first phase of the day, the player can modify and build new buildings, while during the second phase, villagers show reactions to the progression of the street. There are also optional challenges, such as petting 20 cats. At the end of each day, the player is met with daily reports. Players can adjust the speed of each day.

The sandbox mode features two different modes, a planner mode and creative mode. In the planner mode, the player must organise a street with limited resources, while in the creative mode, the player has infinite resources.

== Development and release ==
Minami Lane was developed by independent game developers Dorian "doot" Signargout and Doriane "blibloop" Randria and published by doot. It was developed in the Unity video game engine, in approximately six months. Randria designed the game as well as its art style, while Signargout developed the game. The soundtrack was composed by Zakku, while they were also helped by "external partners". Signargout and Zakku previously cooperated on their first game, Froggy's Battle. Signargout previously worked at Ubisoft and an indie game development studio as a gameplay programmer, while Randria has background in marketing at Ubisoft. As an artist, Randria was mainly inspired by A Space for the Unbound (2023) and Eastward (2021).

Minami Lane was released on the Steam digital distribution service on 28 February 2024 for the Windows platform. The macOS version was released on 12 March 2024. It was later released for Nintendo Switch on 29 August 2024 and Xbox Series X/S, Xbox One, PlayStation 4, and PlayStation 5 on 9 July 2025. It was released on Itch.io digital distribution service on 2 December 2024.

== Reception ==
Reception

Aggregate scores
Aggregator	Score
Metacritic	(PC) 78/100 (XSXS) 73/100
OpenCritic	80%

Review scores
Publication	Score
Hardcore Gamer	9/10
Siliconera	7/10
Multiplayer.it	8/10
Gamereactor	4/10

Minami Lane received "generally favorable" reviews for PC and "mixed or average" reviews for Xbox Series X/S according to the review aggregator website Metacritic. Fellow review aggregator OpenCritic noted that 80% of critics recommended the game.

Reviewers criticised the game's short length; Jenni Lada of Siliconera noted that because of it, some elements feel repetitive. Marley M of Hardcore Gamer described the gameplay as "engaging", noting that the optional challenges keep the players engaged; she also praised the game's mechanics. Giorgio Melani of Multiplayer.it praised the management system. On the other hand, Conny Andersson of Gamereactor noted that the game's loop is repetitive, while also complaining that "you can't do anything more once the day starts". Regarding the sandbox mode, Marley noted that the game offers modes for strategy and casual approaches.

The game's art style has been praised. Melani noted that its pastel looks are anime-inspired, while Marley complimented the chibi-anime art style. She also commended the "vibrant, dynamic world".

Marley also noted some criticisms, such as limited accessibility features and small bugs, while also noting that they "do not significantly detract from the overall enjoyment and egagement the game offers". Melani criticised the "pointer-centric interface".
