= Mike Wilson (executive) =

American business executive (born 1970)

Michael S. Wilson
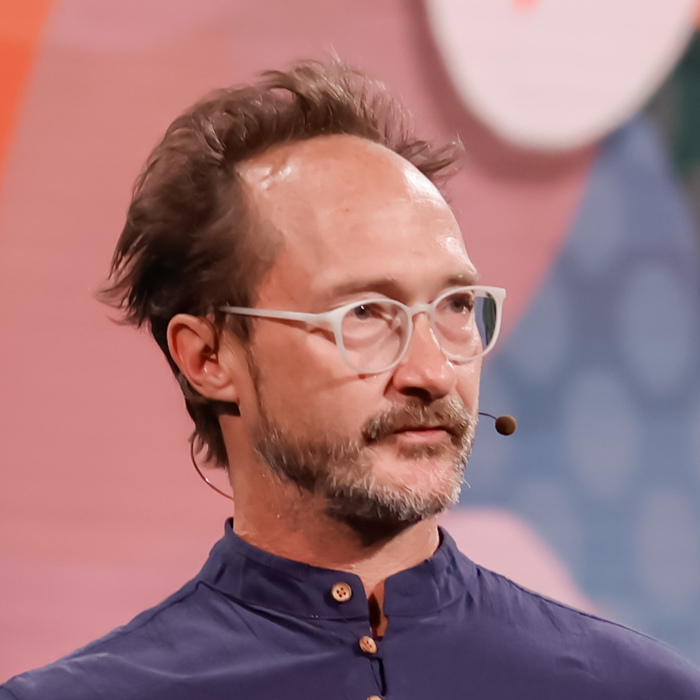
- Wilson in 2022
- Born: 1970 (age 55–56)

Michael S. Wilson (born 1970) is an American business executive, video game producer, and film-maker. Beginning his career at DWANGO as vice president of development before being hired to lead marketing and publishing at id Software in 1995, Wilson has subsequently co-founded independent video game publishers, including Gathering of Developers, Gamecock Media Group, Devolver Digital, Good Shepherd Entertainment, and DeepWell DTx.

Wilson has been a speaker at South by Southwest, Reboot Red, Reboot Blue, E3, the International Games Summit on Mental Health Awareness, Game Developers Conference, and is an advocate for mental health in games, and self-care and unionization in the world of independent game development. In 2019, he called on the industry to start grappling with the reality of video game addiction and begin taking active measures to curb its effects through "being more intentional about the content we create."

Wilson was a partner and frontman for Devolver Digital since co-founding the company in 2009 and concurrently was Chief Creative Officer for Good Shepherd Entertainment from 2012 through 2020. He also currently sits on the advisory board of Take This, a non-profit dedicated to raising awareness about mental health issues for video game professionals within the industry.

In 2019, Wilson co-founded Transcend Victoria, a Victoria, British Columbia-based entertainment company dedicated to creating "immediate, interactive art" designed to bring people offline and together in shared physical spaces.

Wilson was the co-founder and co-chief executive officer of DeepWell DTx, a video game publisher and developer.

Wilson left DeepWell DTx in 2023. He is an executive officer at Medicinal Media, which he co-founded with Melissa Wilson.

== Career ==
=== DWANGO ===
Wilson began his career in his early 20s as Vice President of Development for DWANGO, an early online gaming service based in the United States, which pioneered the use of a nationwide network of dial-up servers to host multiplayer sessions of Doom, Quake, Duke Nukem 3D, Shadow Warrior, and Heretic, and other popular video game titles.

Following the platform's explosion in popularity, Wilson left DWANGO in 1995 to join Doom developer id Software to bolster the company's first forays into game publishing.

=== id Software ===
Wilson joined id Software in 1995 to help lead marketing for the company's gaming catalog, and subsequently oversaw the launches of several prominent games in id's line-up, including new installments of the Doom and Heretic/Hexen franchises. Wilson also led the launch the retail shareware version of Quake through use of encrypted CD-ROMs (and later DVDs), making the titles readily available to all major retailers and, for the first time, 7-Eleven stores nationwide.

=== Ion Storm ===
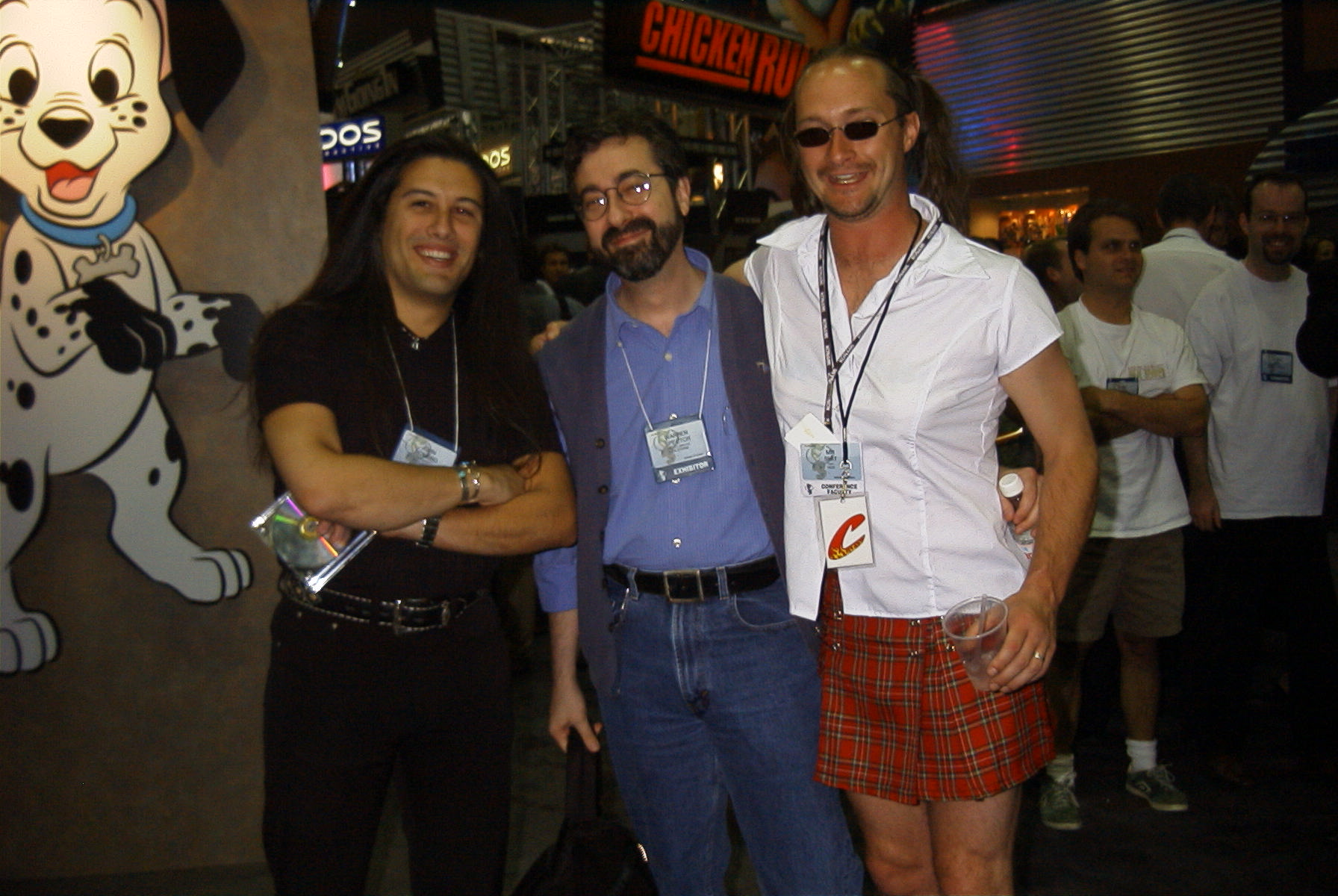
Wilson, John Romero and Warren Spector in attendance at E3 2000

Wilson left id Software at the beginning of 1997 to join John Romero and Tom Hall for the launch of the game development company, Ion Storm. Wilson was chief executive officer from February 1997 to the end of 1997, overseeing the company's growth from 8 to 88 employees in under a year. Wilson and other executives exited Ion Storm following a public conflict with another partner in the company, Todd Porter, who became chief executive officer after Wilson's departure. Before departing to found Gathering of Developers, Wilson joined Romero on his trip to Austin to recruit Warren Spector onto the Ion team, subsequently leading to the creation of the Deus Ex franchise in the company's Austin development studio.

=== Gathering of Developers ===
In January 1998, Wilson – in partnership with Harry Miller, the chief executive officer of Ritual Entertainment, and several other independent development studios including 3D Realms, Epic Games, Terminal Reality, and PopTop Software – founded Gathering of Developers. Gathering was founded as an artist-friendly, developer-driven publishing operation which would brand its developers above the publishing label and permit them to own their intellectual property, thereby earning the highest royalty rates in the industry at that time. Funded through distribution and co-publishing deals by Take-Two Interactive, Gathering published several PC games including Railroad Tycoon 2, Stronghold, Serious Sam, Tropico, Darkstone, Mafia, and, finally, Max Payne following the company's acquisition by Take-Two in May 2000.

Following the sudden death of Gathering co-founder Doug Myres in the summer of 2001, Wilson and Miller, along with the majority of Texas-based talent at Gathering, departed Take-Two to form SubstanceTV.

=== SubstanceTV ===
After leaving Take-Two in 2001, Wilson took the majority of Gathering's employees with him to a new start-up video-magazine on DVD called SubstanceTV. SubstanceTV's focus was aimed at alternative, non-mainstream content such as music videos, short films, original short documentaries, and other content not available elsewhere. Unable to make the venture work commercially, Wilson winded it down in August 2002 after publishing seven issues.

=== Take-Two Interactive ===
In 2002, Wilson returned to Take-Two as Executive Vice President of A&R. Wilson spent the next several years holding dual roles in the worlds of gaming and film, jointly shepherding projects for Take-Two and his own Gone Off Deep Productions film imprint, which released the documentary Burning Man: Beyond Black Rock in 2005. Wilson has continued to produce multiple feature-length and short-form film projects via Gone Off Deep in recent years, including 2011's Austin High and 2016's Stand Up Empire.

=== Gamecock Media Group ===
On February 12, 2007, Mike Wilson and his partners Harry Miller and Rick Stults announced the formation of Gamecock Media Group, a new video game publisher that "they hope will act as the equivalent of an independent film company for small game developers." Gamecock was acquired by SouthPeak Games in October 2008, after releasing several titles including Mushroom Men for Wii and Nintendo DS, Dementium: The Ward for Nintendo DS, Hail to the Chimp for Xbox 360 and PlayStation 3, Legendary for Xbox 360 and PlayStation 3, Stronghold: Crusader Extreme for PC, Insecticide for PC and Nintendo DS, and Fury for PC. Southpeak dissolved the brand and released later Gamecock titles, such as Velvet Assassin and Section 8 under their own label.

=== Devolver Digital ===
In spring 2008, Mike Wilson rejoined Harry Miller, Rick Stults, and several other former partners to found Devolver Digital, a producer/publisher hybrid initially working with Croteam – creators of the Serious Sam franchise that Wilson and Miller helped establish while with Gathering of Developers. WIlson has been a founding partner and spokesperson of Devolver Digital since its inception.

Devolver's first release, Serious Sam HD: The First Encounter, came out in November 2009 on PC and January 2010 on Xbox Live Arcade. Serious Sam HD: The Second Encounter was released in May 2010 on PC and September 22 on XBLA. After the release of Serious Sam 3: BFE in 2011, Devolver decided to shift its focus from larger development cycles to the emerging indie gaming scene. Using the Serious Sam series as a test bed for indie development and relations, Devolver worked with developer Vlambeer to release Serious Sam: The Random Encounter in October 2011. Since then, Devolver has gone on to release Hotline Miami with developer Dennaton Games, selling over two million copies on Steam alone as of October 2016.

Since 2017, Devolver has released more than 50 new game titles, including Hotline Miami 2: Wrong Number, Gris, Reigns, My Friend Pedro, and multiple installments of the acclaimed Enter the Gungeon and Shadow Warrior franchises. In 2020, the company, in concert with UK-based developer Mediatonic, released its biggest hit to date with Fall Guys: Ultimate Knockout, which sold more than two million copies on Steam within a week of its release. Heralded as "the perfect game for the coronavirus age" by USA Today, the game's near-instantaneous success has been attributed to its non-violent, joyfully communal gameplay, which has been called "a salve to social isolation and an escape from the constant barrage of bad news" during the 2020 global pandemic.

In 2020, Devolver announced its first television project with an adaptation of My Friend Pedro, to be written and executive produced by John Wick creator Derek Kolstad. Envisioned as an "R-rated, half-hour dramedy," Wilson will be an executive producer on the series, alongside Legendary Entertainment, DJ2 Entertainment, and Deadpool 2 director David Leitch.

==== Devolver Digital Films ====
At SXSW 2013, Devolver announced that they would be extending the brand to digital film distribution. Wilson sperheaded Devolver's film distribution arm, bringing in partner Andie Grace as the company's VP of Acquisitions – a move prompted by Steam's then-new move into the distribution of films and videos. In 2019, both Steam and Devolver ceased its acquisition of independent films, due to Steam refocusing its efforts on VR. Devolver had released more than 75 films on Steam and other various digital platforms before shuttering the division.

=== Good Shepherd Entertainment ===
In 2012, Wilson co-founded Good Shepherd Entertainment (formerly known as Gambitious Digital Entertainment) alongside Harry Miller, Paul Hanraets, and Andy Payne, where he was Chief Creative Officer until 2020. The company was founded to further Devolver's core philosophies of fairness and equitably for game creators but operate at a smaller scale with a focus on games budgeted at under $1 million, a stated emphasis on quality, and the ability to allow independent investors to invest alongside the label for each title.

Since 2014, Good Shepherd has released more than 25 games with an average 30 percent profit on each title. Their catalog includes the Transport Fever series, Semblance, Phantom Doctrine, and Where the Water Tastes Like Wine, which features voiceover work by Grammy Award-winning musician Sting.

In 2019, Good Shepherd released John Wick Hex – its first game to be based on a major entertainment property – which was developed to fit canonically within the universe of Lionsgate's John Wick film franchise and featured actors Ian McShane and Lance Reddick reprising their roles from John Wick: Chapter 2.

=== Take This ===
In March 2018, Wilson was appointed to the board of Take This, a Washington-based non-profit organization founded in 2013 by video game journalists Russ Pitts and Susan Arendt and clinical psychologist Dr. Mark Kline. The organization is dedicated to providing resources and channels for mental health discussions for professionals in the video game industry. It also regularly publishes white papers addressing the industry's controversial working conditions, such as "crunch time," and provides AFK ("away from keyboard") rooms for relaxation purposes at busy gaming industry conventions, including PAX, in addition to other programs in person and online.

=== DeepWell DTx ===
In 2022, Wilson announced the creation of DeepWell Digital Therapeutics (DTx), a new video game publisher and developer dedicated to creating "medically therapeutic games" that can be used to treat an array of medical and mental health conditions, including "depression, anxiety, and hypertension", while maintaining "best-in-class gameplay" and entertainment value for players.

DeepWell was co-founded by Wilson alongside Ryan Douglas, a medical device expert and former chief executive officer of international medical technology company Nextern. As of March 2022, DeepWell had "more than 40 game designers, medical researchers, scientists, and creators" – including Tom Hall (Doom), Zoe Flower (Hellbent Games), Rami Ismail (Nuclear Throne), Lorne Lanning (Oddworld), American McGee (American McGee's Alice), and others – working toward the release of the company's first game, slated for a projected 2023 release.

In addition to its own games, the company has also announced its intent to create and license "a suite of processes that follow FDA guidelines" to assist other independent "developers in designing and repurposing games to bring out therapeutic value" for new and other pre-existing game titles.

=== Medicinal Media ===
Founded in 2023 by Wilson, and backed by Nanea Reeves and Terry Gross, the company's primary aim is to show users "how to use media more mindfully." Wilson coined the term "Medicinal Media" and started the project during his time at DeepWell DTx. He created the company to employ digital media as a tool for healing during the ongoing mental health crisis. Wilson was also recognized as a leader on the purpose-driven entrepreneurship front by Forbes, stating "We're witnessing a paradigm shift in the global business landscape as more entrepreneurs recognize the need to address pressing social and environmental issues." In May 2024, Medicinal Media brought Jada Pinkett-Smith and actress Adriene Mishler onto their board, with Pinkett-Smith stating, "I love Medicinal Media because it...uses joyous art...to fill the gaps of traditional mental healthcare, especially for those with limited or no access."

=== Realize Music ===
In 2024, Wilson announced that he has founded Realize Music along with music industry veteran Mark Roemer (CEO), a company that will focus on participatory music based experiences for wellness. In late 2024, the first project, entitled Realize Music: Sing was announced to be coming to the Meta Quest platform, with blanket license partnerships from Universal Music Group and Warner Music Group to provide "the most music ever included in any game or interactive app." Realize Music claims a catalogue of more than 1m songs at launch. "It's unlike karaoke in that you sing along with your favorite artists instead of having your voice isolated," Wilson stated. Like Medicinal Media and DeepWell, Realize Music continues Wilson's trend of focusing on mental health. Wilson cites medical studies that have shown that singing has both physical and psychological health benefits.

== Games ==
Year	Title	Credit
1995	Ultimate Doom	Marketing
1995	Hexen	Marketing
1996	Final Doom	Marketing
1996	Quake	Marketing
1997	Doom 64	Business Liaison
1998	Railroad Tycoon 2	Co-Executive Producer
1999	Hidden & Dangerous	Co-Executive Producer
2000	Heavy Metal: F.A.K.K. 2	Co-Executive Producer
2000	Rune	Co-Executive Producer
2001	Oni	Co-Executive Producer
2001	Serious Sam: The First Encounter	Co-Executive Producer
2001	Tropico	Co-Executive Producer
2001	Max Payne	Co-Executive Producer
2001	Stronghold	Co-Executive Producer
2002	Serious Sam: The Second Encounter	Co-Executive Producer
2002	Lost Kingdoms	Co-Executive Producer
2002	Mafia: The City of Lost Heaven	Co-Executive Producer
2005	Serious Sam II	Co-Executive Producer
2009	Legendary	Co-Executive Producer
2009	Velvet Assassin	Co-Executive Producer
2011	Serious Sam 3: BFE	Co-Executive Producer
2012	Hotline Miami	Co-Executive Producer
2013	Despicable Me: Minion Rush	Co-Executive Producer
2013	Shadow Warrior	Co-Executive Producer
2014	Luftrausers	Co-Executive Producer
2014	Broforce	Co-Executive Producer
2014	The Talos Principle	Co-Executive Producer
2015	Hotline Miami 2: Wrong Number	Co-Executive Producer
2015	Not a Hero	Co-Executive Producer
2015	Dropsy	Co-Executive Producer
2015	Downwell	Co-Executive Producer
2016	Enter the Gungeon	Co-Executive Producer
2016	Shadow Warrior 2	Co-Executive Producer
2016	Mother Russia Bleeds	Co-Executive Producer
2017	Absolver	Co-Executive Producer
2017	Ruiner	Co-Executive Producer
2018	Genital Jousting	Co-Executive Producer
2018	Where the Water Tastes Like Wine	Co-Executive Producer
2019	Katana Zero	Co-Executive Producer
2019	Observation	Co-Executive Producer
2019	My Friend Pedro	Co-Executive Producer
2019	John Wick Hex	Co-Executive Producer
2020	Carrion	Co-Executive Producer
2020	Fall Guys	Co-Executive Producer

== Filmography ==
Year	Title	Producer	Writer
2005	Burning Man: Beyond Black Rock	Yes	No
2005	Preacher with an Unknown God	Yes	No
2006	The Temple Builder	Yes	No
2007	God's Work	No	Story
2010	Gillespie	Yes	No
2011	Austin High	Yes	Story
2012	Training for the Apocalypse	Co-Executive Producer	No
2013	Blood Sun Town	Associate Producer	No
2015	Steam Dream	Executive Producer	No
2015	The Hotline Miami Story	Co-Executive Producer	No
2016	Stand Up Empire	Executive Producer	Creator
