= The Ward (2000 video game) =

The Ward Poslanik
- English-release cover art
- Developer: Fragile Bits
- Publishers: HR: LMI; WW: On-Deck Interactive
- Platform: Windows
- Release: HR: 2000; WW: January 2001
- Genres: Adventure; Science fiction
- Mode: Single player

The Ward is a 2000 point and click adventure video game developed by Fragile Bits. It was first published in Croatia under the name Poslanik by LMI, followed by an international release by On-Deck Interactive in January 2001.

== Development and sales ==
The game uses 3D pre-rendered character models over a static, often animated backgrounds. The developer released a demo, which could be found on the CD of the computer magazine Hacker. The development took around 2 years without a budget and the game sold in nearly 300,000 units.

== Synopsis ==
The story follows the fictionalized version of events of the Apollo 19 mission from 1979. Two of the crew member are found dead, with the protagonist, David Walker, finding himself in an extraterrestrial laboratory. Throughout the story, the protagonist realizes he is meant to be the mythical Ward, in order to resolve the conflict between two alien races; the Greys and the Reptillians. He sets out to help humanity from total annihilation, but also aids Greys in their war against their former masters, the reptillians. During the course of the adventure, he uncovers many secrets and histories of the universe.

== Reception ==
Reception

Review scores
Publication	Score
Computer Games Magazine	1.5/5
The Electric Playground	6.8/10

Croatian website Gamer.hr praised its low system requirements, the story, music and the animations but stated the game was littered with bugs and the movement was badly implemented. It also criticized its ending as rushed, as if it skipped over a certain portion of its story.

The game received mixed reviews upon its international release. Ron Dulin, in his review for GameSpot gave it 6.2 out of 10, praising certain points in its story and gameplay, but criticized the lack of voiceovers, the dated graphics and the lackluster progression of its story. IGN gave a similar opinion, stating that, apart from a neat few locales, it falls short of games like The Longest Journey due to the relatively low production values. It, however, praised its soundtrack and gameplay as entertaining, giving the entire package 6.4 out of 10. PC Zone gave it 5.1 out of 10, mostly criticizing its outdatedness.

The game currently holds a score of 57/100 based on 14 reviews on Metacritic and 60/100 on Gamerankings based on 19 reviews.
