= Stronghold Crusader II =

2014 video game

- Developer: Firefly Studios
- Publisher: Firefly Studios
- Producer: Paul Harris
- Designer: Simon Bradbury
- Programmers: Matt de Villiers; Tony DeLibero
- Artist: Benjamin Lloyd Thomas
- Writer: Simon Bradbury
- Composer: Robert L. Euvino
- Series: Stronghold
- Engine: Vision
- Platform: Windows
- Release: 23 September 2014
- Genre: Real-time strategy
- Modes: Single-player, multiplayer

Stronghold Crusader II is a 2014 real-time strategy video game developed and published by Firefly Studios for Windows. A spin-off of the Stronghold series, it is the sequel to their 2002 title Stronghold: Crusader.

== Gameplay ==
The first gameplay demo was given to journalists at E3 2013 and the first gameplay trailer, showing pre-alpha footage, was released at Gamescom 2013. Both the demo and trailer showed off several new aspects that the game will introduce to the series.

=== Features ===
Stronghold Crusader II gameplay

The game is the first of the Crusader series to feature a 3D graphics engine, but does not retain all of the elements of the original 2D game while adding new features such as "new units like the cruel Slave Driver, new beefed up AI opponents, dynamic on-map events like the Locust Swarm", as well as "new visuals, a new battle interface, and engine enhancements including effects, animations, and real-time physics." A brand new feature to the series is co-op multiplayer, in which 2 players take control of a single castle to share units and resources while fighting against common enemies. Crusader II will feature both a Crusader and Arabic historical single player campaign at launch. The game will mainly be based around skirmish gameplay, similar to the original Stronghold Crusader title. This will include, as with the original Stronghold Crusader, skirmish trails; in which players need to fight through linked skirmish maps with different set-ups in a particular order. The game is expected to be based more on warfare with little but substantial government.

=== Extras ===
As with previous titles in the series, there is a full map editor for users to create and share custom maps for the game. Robert Euvino, who worked on previous titles in the series, composed an all new soundtrack for the game.

== Critical reception ==
Reception

Aggregate score
Aggregator	Score
Metacritic	65/100

Review scores
Publication	Score
GameSpot	6/10
PC Gamer (US)	64/100

The game received mixed to positive reviews on release, as of 29 November 2014 garnering an aggregated score of 66% on Metacritic, based on 28 critics' reviews. It has been praised for striking a good balance between the economic and military aspects of the game and staying true to the series and its strategy roots. Conversely, some critics labelled the latter as "nostalgia" and felt it lacking in some areas, in comparison to contemporary strategy titles.
