= Stronghold Legends =

2006 video game

- Developer: Firefly Studios
- Publisher: 2K
- Producer: Paul Harris
- Designer: Simon Bradbury
- Programmers: Warrick Buchanan; Andrew Prime; Will Wilson
- Artist: Robert Thornley
- Writers: Rhianna Pratchett; Simon Bradbury
- Composer: Robert L. Euvino
- Series: Stronghold
- Platform: Windows
- Release: EU: 13 October 2006; AU: 20 October 2006; NA: 23 October 2006
- Genre: Real-time strategy
- Modes: Single-player, multiplayer

Stronghold Legends is a 2006 real-time strategy video game developed by Firefly Studios and published by 2K for Windows. It is the fourth game in the Stronghold series.

Stronghold Legends contains 24 missions spanning three different campaigns: King Arthur and his Knights of the Round Table, Count Vlad Dracula, and Siegfried of Germany. This sequel contains a new feature that allows the player to control human and mythical armies. Creatures like dragons and witches can be created in Stronghold Legends.

== Gameplay ==
Unlike the previous Stronghold titles, Legends gives the player a choice of different starting rulers with different troop types (including King Arthur and his knights of the round table, Count Vlad Dracula, and Siegfried of Xanten). Other new features include cooperative multiplayer against computer-controlled opponents and the choice between different gameplay options for online play (Deathmatch, King of the Hill, Economic War, and Capture the Flag).

Each faction has new and unique unit groups. Most special units have their own unique ability, which must be recharged after they are used. Dragons are also available to every faction, but have a set lifetime. All other special units remain on the map until they die. In story mode the players not necessarily bound to their factions special units. For example, King Arthur can make use of the Ice Tower instead of the Round Table for more balanced game play.

Stronghold Legends has been made using a similar graphics engine as Stronghold 2 – the game appeared to be a minor rehash of the previous game on the first inspection. However, playing it revealed that the graphics were considerably improved and new music tracks had been added. More units were available; features like crime were removed entirely, minor changes like this have altered the gameplay experience slightly. It was included in the Mastertronic range of games in the UK, showing its popularity.

== Plot ==
There are three story lines that follow three different lords and their conquests. Each storyline also has a corresponding campaign difficulty but the gameplay difficulty can be changed independently. Each campaign has its own set of heroes and special units that corresponds with the campaigns theme. The defensive buildings will also change depending on the level and campaign. The modes are as follows:

- King Arthur (Easy): This storyline follows King Arthur and his Knights of the Round Table. Merlin frequently becomes a necessary part of the campaign. The first three missions of this campaign must be completed before choosing another storyline. The environment found in this storyline is lush and vibrant with plenty of trees.
- Ice (Medium): This storyline follows Siegfried of Xanten and his conquest in the snowy north. The environment is almost completely covered in snow and dragons frequently nest in the hills around the map. This campaign is harder due to more hazards from special units as well as the Frost Giants present throughout much of the campaign. The special units of this campaign are frost themed with corresponding abilities.
- Evil (Hard): This storyline follows Count Vladislav Dracul (Vlad the Impaler). The environment of this campaign is a dead land that has been corrupted. This campaign includes various new special units for Vlad but few appear on the enemies side. Vlad's campaign is challenging due to enormous numbers of enemy knights and pikemen as well as large requirements that must be met to advance into the next level. The special units of this campaign are werewolves, demons, and various corrupted creatures as well as new siege weaponry.

== Reception ==
Reception

Aggregate score
Aggregator	Score
Metacritic	57/100

Review scores
Publication	Score
Computer Games Magazine	2/5
Eurogamer	6/10
GameSpot	4.3/10
GameSpy	2/5
GameZone	6.8/10
IGN	5.7/10
PC Gamer (UK)	72%
PC Gamer (US)	59%
VideoGamer.com	7/10
X-Play	2/5
The Times	4/5

The game received "mixed" reviews according to the review aggregation website Metacritic.
