= Dungeon Hero =

Cancelled video game

- Developer(s): Firefly Studios
- Publisher(s): Gamecock Media Group
- Writer(s): Rhianna Pratchett
- Engine: Trinigy
- Platform(s): Microsoft Windows, Xbox 360
- Release: Cancelled
- Genre(s): Role-playing
- Mode(s): Single-player

Dungeon Hero was a role-playing video game under development by Firefly Studios. It had been in development for several years and had been scheduled to be released in 2009 for Microsoft Windows and Xbox 360. Originally being published by Gamecock Media Group until they were bought out by SouthPeak Games in October 2008. Firefly Studios announced that the title was originally put 'on hold', before being cancelled.

== Gameplay ==
Dungeon Hero featured strategic hack-and-slash gameplay with role-playing game (RPG) elements. The game took place in a retro-modern world during a massive war. Most of the game took place above ground fighting for the goblin cause. The beginning of the game was placed in one of the goblin's fortified locations, or dungeon, where a goblin hospital has been set up. The task of the player was to help the goblins win their war in exchange for your freedom.

== Plot ==
The player is a Mercenary and has come across a goblin city, looking for treasure. However, the goblin city is under attack and the goblins hire the mercenary to help them. As the mercenary, you must help the goblins defend their home from hordes of enemies.
