= CivCity: Rome =

2006 video game

- Developers: Firefly Studios; Firaxis Games
- Publisher: 2K Games
- Producer: Darrin Horbal
- Designer: Simon Bradbury
- Artist: Darrin Horbal
- Writer: Simon Bradbury
- Composer: Robert L. Euvino
- Series: Civilization
- Platform: Microsoft Windows
- Release: NA: July 24, 2006; PAL: July 28, 2006
- Genre: City-building
- Mode: Single-player

CivCity: Rome is a city building strategy game by Firefly Studios and Firaxis Games. It includes elements from two game series, Caesar and Civilization.

The player manages various cities of the Roman Empire by strategic placement of buildings. Making sure that each neighborhood has access to all the commodities it needs to upgrade the residences of citizens is the primary challenge.

== Gameplay ==
Trajan's Column in the game

The game offers two types of mission: stand-alone missions to include freeplay (or "sandbox") and campaign-based tutorial missions. The campaign-based mission begins when the player, an engineer, is hired by a local stone works overseer to build a stone mine colony. The player then gets further opportunities to prove himself, meeting such historic characters as Marcus Licinius Crassus and Julius Caesar. The player is granted various ranks, progressing through such titles as Quaestor, Aedile, Censor, Tribune, Praetor and Consul.

Each campaign mission begins with the player's patron offering the greeting of "Hail!" and then stating the character's title. Midway through the game, the player can choose to embark on military campaigns or continue to play peaceful missions which have harder goals but no risk of invasion. In the five military missions, the player can fight three different enemies: the Egyptians, the Germanic tribes of the north, and the famous warriors of Carthage. The building and research options vary according to which mission the player chooses.

The game comes with 27 different maps and 34 missions with user-created scenarios offering many game play possibilities. There are over 75 unique units, 115 different building types and 70 technologies to research in the game. The player can also find over 1000 historical facts in the Civilopedia. There are seven wonders that can be built: the Colosseum, the Great Library, the Great Lighthouse of Alexandria, Trajan's Column, the Obelisk, Circus Maximus, and the Pantheon. Production of these trophy buildings will confer various advantages to the city.

Some citizens will break the fourth wall and state that they are aware they are in a video game. One female citizen specifically will state that she often looks upwards and sees a great face staring down at her (referencing the player).

The player can look inside of various buildings and interact with many of the city's residents. If these citizens are not paid, fed, or given other necessities, they will start to become unhappy. If city happiness falls too low, people will start to leave the city. In the game, there is also chance that certain people, (Cleopatra, Attila the Hun, Julius Caesar, etc.), can increase or decrease city happiness by sending messages. Some natural disasters can occur, such as earthquakes and fires, and these can bring down buildings.

An in-game editor allows players to create new maps and scenarios.

== Reception ==
Reception

Aggregate score
Aggregator	Score
Metacritic	67/100

Review scores
Publication	Score
Computer Games Magazine	2.5/5
Computer Gaming World	(unfavorable)
Eurogamer	5/10
Game Informer	8/10
GamePro	2.5/5
GameRevolution	C−
GameSpot	6.6/10
GameSpy	3.5/5
GameZone	6.9/10
IGN	8.2/10
Maximum PC	6/10
PC Gamer (UK)	65%
The Sydney Morning Herald	3/5
The Times	3/5

The game received average reviews according to the review aggregation website Metacritic. Reviewers claimed that derivative and monotonous gameplay and graphical bugs dampened the playing experience.

== See also ==
- Master of Olympus - Zeus
