= Edna & Harvey =

Edna & Harvey may refer to either of two computer games:

- Edna & Harvey: The Breakout (2008)
- Edna & Harvey: Harvey's New Eyes (2012)
