= Space Colony (video game) =

2003 video game

- Developer: Firefly Studios
- Publisher: Gathering
- Producer: Timothy Beggs
- Designer: Simon Bradbury
- Programmer: Andrew Prime
- Artist: Mike Best
- Composer: Robert L. Euvino
- Platforms: Windows, Mac OS X
- Release: NA: October 14, 2003; EU: September 26, 2003; NA/EU: June 14, 2004 (OS X)
- Genres: Real-time strategy, life simulation
- Mode: Single-player

Space Colony is a 2003 real-time strategy video game developed by Firefly Studios and published by Gathering in 2003. Aspyr Media released a Mac OS X port in 2004. The game was re-released as digital HD version on November 8, 2012.

== Gameplay ==
Gameplay screenshot.

The basic premise is similar to The Sims in that the player has to care for the needs of several individuals - here each with a unique predefined personality and different abilities. However the game is mission orientated and involves setting up a futuristic base and carrying out missions which involve mining minerals, developing relationships, harvesting resources to prevent running out of oxygen and power, collecting food, and fighting back alien attacks.

A bonus campaign was released in 2004. It has 5 missions and takes place on the planet Cobash.

=== Characters ===
There are 20 main characters in this game. All the characters' attitudes are determined by their happiness. It is necessary to meet the characters' needs and demands so their work levels don't drop. Therefore, they need enough oxygen, power and food or entertaining with bars, clubs, saunas and over other 100 buildings available. Mental health is also an issue in a small colony in space, so meditation spaces, psychotherapy and even detention pods can be of use.

== Development ==
=== Mini game ===
A 2D action-oriented mini-game called Alien Horde was created to promote Space Colony. Players assume the role of Space Colony's leading lady Venus. She has to fight back alien attacks and try to rescue Space Colony's hard-working Scandinavian biker Stig, plus she has to prevent running out of oxygen. Alien Horde is open-ended, and the gameplay becomes more intense with each level. Beside the same setting the gameplay of the minigame has not much in common with the more strategic-oriented gameplay of Space Colony.

=== Music ===
Space Colony's theme song "You're So Gangsta" was contributed by the band Chromeo.

=== HD version ===
Space Colony HD was released on November 8, 2012. The new version of the game features high-definition graphics and a wider field of view, with support for resolutions up to 2560x1600. The re-release includes 8 new official bonus campaigns and the previously released Cobash bonus campaign plus 6 user-created campaigns from SpaceColonyFans.net. The game is compatible with Windows 2000/XP/7/8/10. Purchases from GOG.com include the Alien Horde mini-game, HD wallpaper, a digital manual and the soundtrack of the game. A separate HD patch for owners of the previous version was released on November 12, 2012.

=== Steam Edition ===
Space Colony: Steam Edition was released on April 30, 2015. This version includes a number of exclusive Steam features such as achievements, trading cards, and Steam Cloud for saved games. Also supported are high resolution graphics settings of the previous HD version, allowing players to view their entire colony while playing on a single screen. The game is compatible with Windows XP through 10.

== Reception ==
Reception

Review scores
Publication	Score
Computer Gaming World	2.5/5
X-Play	4/5
Computer Games Magazine	4/5

On Metacritic, a review aggregator, Space Colony has a score of 75/100 based on 21 reviews. Dan Adams of IGN rated it 7.5/10 and wrote that it is "almost great" but has too many annoyances, such as the characters' irritatingly quirky personalities. In his review for GameSpot, Andrew Park called it "an interesting game but not a truly compelling one". In rating it 6.7/10, Park criticized the lack of variety in gameplay, as each problem can be solved in very similar ways, and there are few spontaneous interactions between the colonists. Eurogamer's Martin Taylor rated the game 6/10 and recommended it only to fans of The Sims, who might not mind the requirement of constant supervision. GamePro rated it 4.5/5 stars and called it "a tough, funny, and very charismatic hybrid" of The Sims and strategy games. Joel Durham Jr. of GameSpy rated it 4/5 stars and wrote, "More than just Sims in Space, Space Colony mixes city-building, real-time strategy, and offbeat humor to produce an enjoyable and unique strategy title." Space Colony: Steam Edition has a score of 74/100 based on 10 reviews on Metacritic.
