= Gamecock Media Group =

American video game publisher

- Type: Subsidiary
- Industry: Video games
- Founded: February 12, 2007; 19 years ago
- Founders: Mike Wilson; Harry Miller; Rick Stults
- Defunct: October 14, 2008
- Fate: Dissolved
- Headquarters: Austin, Texas, U.S.
- Area served: North America
- Key people: Mike Wilson (CEO)
- Parent: SouthPeak Games (2008)

Gamecock Media Group was an American video game publisher based in Austin, Texas, founded in February 2007 by Mike Wilson, Harry Miller and Rick Stults, formerly founders and executives of Gathering of Developers. The company was acquired by SouthPeak Games in October 2008 and subsequently shut down.

== History ==
=== Founding ===
Gamecock Media Group was founded by Mike Wilson and Harry Miller, alongside Rick Stults. All three had previously co-founded Gathering of Developers in 1998, where they were chief executive officer (CEO), president and chief financial officer, respectively. Gamecock's existence was announced on February 12, 2007, and coincided with the reveal of the first five games that would be released through Gamecock—Fury by Auran, Insecticide by Crackpot Entertainment, Mushroom Men by Red Fly Studio, Hail to the Chimp by Wideload Games, and Hero by Firefly Studios.

Gamecock used a more hands-off approach and allowed developers creative freedom with their work, as well as letting them keep their own intellectual property. For the new company, Wilson was appointed CEO.

=== 2007 Spike Video Game Awards controversy ===
During the 2007 Spike Video Game Awards in Las Vegas, as Ken Levine was about to take the stage and give an acceptance speech for the Game of the Year award for BioShock, Gamecock employees rushed the stage in capes and rooster hats, using the microphone for self-promotion. The interruption resulted in Levine being unable to talk before he was ushered off-stage. Gamecock CEO Wilson later apologized.

=== Acquisition and closure ===
On October 14, 2008, Gamecock was acquired by SouthPeak Games. Subsequently, Gamecock's Austin operations were closed, and all outstanding games were transferred to SouthPeak, with the Gamecock brand being retired.

== Games published ==
Year	Title	Platform(s)
2007	Fury	Microsoft Windows
2007	Dementium: The Ward	Nintendo DS
2008	Insecticide	Microsoft Windows, Nintendo DS
2008	Stronghold Crusader Extreme	Microsoft Windows
2008	Hail to the Chimp	PlayStation 3, Xbox 360
2008	Pirates vs. Ninjas Dodgeball	Xbox 360, Wii
2008	Legendary	Microsoft Windows, PlayStation 3, Xbox 360
2008	Mushroom Men	Nintendo DS, Wii
