= Gathering of Developers =

American video game publisher

Gathering of Developers, Inc.
- Trade name: Gathering (2003–2004)
- Type: Subsidiary
- Industry: Video games
- Founded: January 13, 1998; 28 years ago in Dallas, US
- Founder: Mike Wilson; Harry Miller; Jim Bloom; Rick Stults; Doug Myres
- Defunct: September 9, 2004; 21 years ago
- Fate: Dissolved; operations folded into Global Star Software
- Headquarters: New York City, US
- Parent: Take-Two Interactive (2000–2004)

Gathering of Developers, Inc. (shortened as G.O.D. or GodGames, and branded as Gathering between 2003 and 2004) was an American video game publisher based in New York City. Founded by Mike Wilson and associates in January 1998 and originally based in Dallas, the company was acquired by Take-Two Interactive in May 2000. Between May 2000 and March 2001, Gathering of Developers also operated a division, On Deck Interactive, which acted as its mass market label. In August 2001, Take-Two Interactive closed Gathering of Developers' Dallas headquarters and moved the label in-house, to New York City. The label was shut down in September 2004, with all assets consumed by Global Star Software.

== History ==
=== Opening and growth ===
Gathering of Developers was announced by Mike Wilson in 1997, with the official opening scheduled for January 1998. Wilson had previously been the CEO of Ion Storm, a video game developer. Wilson's stated vision for the company was to have a video games publisher run by experienced developers rather than marketeers and conventional businessmen. Gathering of Developers was initially an alliance of eight development companies, with each of the founding companies having an equity in the publisher and a representative on the board of directors.

The opening of the company took place on January 13, 1998. Co-founders included Harry Miller, Jim Bloom, Rick Stults and Doug Myres. The same month, video game developer Terminal Reality became an equity partner of Gathering of Developers, through which their vice-president, Brett Combs, took a seat on the publisher's board of directors. Other founding partners included Edge of Reality, 3D Realms, Epic Games, PopTop Software, and Ritual Entertainment. By February 1998, the company had struck an investment deal with Pennsylvania Merchants Group.

On June 1, 1998, video game publisher Take-Two Interactive announced a "subsistantial non-equity investment" in Gathering of Developers, wherein Take-Two Interactive would distribute games published by Gathering of Developers. Take-Two Interactive later went on to acquire a 20% stake in the company by February 1999. Also in February 1999, Gathering of Developers co-founded the Independent Games Festival, which was to premier Game Developers Conference, and also co-hosted and funded the 1999 edition of it. In 1999, the company's title Monster Truck Madness 64, slated for released by Gathering, was shifted to Rockstar Games. In May 1999, Gathering of Developers signed an agreement with Sega to distribute eight of its games on the Heat.net platform.

During the Electronic Entertainment Expo trade shows, Gathering of Developers offered free barbecue, live music and beer to the nearly 10,000 attendees that crossed the street into its parking lot, dubbed the "Promised Lot". At the 2001 edition of the event, Gathering of Developers' booth displayed booth babes dressed up as schoolgirls to promote its adult content.

=== Decline and acquisition ===
On May 1, 2000, Take-Two Interactive announced that it had acquired Gathering of Developers. The deal was signed mainly due to Gathering of Developers' financial instability. On May 4, 2000, Take-Two Interactive and Gathering of Developers launched On Deck Interactive as a publishing label for games with "a consumer friendly price point and a mass market appeal". The company briefly expanded by published its first console game, 4x4 Evolution for the Sega Dreamcast in 2000 and PlayStation 2 in 2001, and it was followed by the sequel 4x4 Evo 2, for the Xbox, also in 2001. Following the departure of On Deck Interactive's CEO Robert Westmoreland, the label was shut down again on March 5, 2001, with all of its upcoming games shifted to Gathering of Developers.

=== Death of co-founder and shut down ===
On May 3, 2001, Gathering of Developers co-founder Myres unexpectedly died of an asthma attack. In his honor, Gathering of Developers announced the "Doug Myres Substance Award" in June that year, which would be handed out at the July 2001 edition of the Cyberathlete Professional League, with a donation to the Dallas Children's Advocacy Center made in the recipient's name.

Gathering of Developers' Dallas offices were closed down by Take-Two Interactive in August 2001, with all operations relocated to Take-Two Interactive's headquarters in New York City. All staff were laid off or left the company, most of which were then hired by SubstanceTV, a new venture previously launched by Wilson and Myres. In 2002, the company was reorganized, so the company could focus on their PC games because the Take-Two Interactive name ceased to exist as a label, while several console games intended for release by Gathering and its self-named Take Two Interactive label was moved to Gotham Games.

By February 2003, Gathering of Developers had been shortened to Gathering. In late 2003, the company briefly expanded and returned into publishing console games when its previous console-friendly label Gotham Games shut down. On September 9, 2004, following poor financial results in Take-Two Interactive's Q3 2004 fiscal quarter, Gathering of Developers was folded into Global Star Software, Take-Two Interactive's budget range publishing label, who was briefly promoted to making mainstream AAA games before the rise of the 2K label in 2005.

== Games published ==
| Title | Platform(s) | Release date | Developer | Ref. |
|---|---|---|---|---|
| Jazz Jackrabbit 2 | Microsoft Windows | August 12, 1998 | Epic MegaGames / Orange Games | |
| Railroad Tycoon II | Microsoft Windows | November 2, 1998 | PopTop Software | |
| Jazz Jackrabbit 2: Holiday Hare '98 | Microsoft Windows | November 6, 1998 | Epic MegaGames | |
| Jazz Jackrabbit 2 | Mac OS | February 9, 1999 | Logicware | |
| Jazz Jackrabbit 2: The Secret Files | Microsoft Windows | March 15, 1999 | Epic MegaGames | |
| Railroad Tycoon II: The Second Century | Microsoft Windows | April 30, 1999 | PopTop Software | |
| Railroad Tycoon II | Mac OS | June 18, 1999 | Westlake Interactive | |
| Railroad Tycoon II: The Second Century | Mac OS | June 18, 1999 | Westlake Interactive | |
| Darkstone | Microsoft Windows | July 26, 1999 | Delphine Software International | |
| Fly! | Mac OS | July 28, 1999 | Terminal Reality | |
| Fly! | Microsoft Windows | July 28, 1999 | Terminal Reality | |
| Railroad Tycoon II | Linux | October 15, 1999 | Loki Entertainment Software | |
| Nocturne | Microsoft Windows | October 28, 1999 | Terminal Reality | |
| Age of Wonders | Microsoft Windows | November 11, 1999 | Triumph Studios / Epic Games | |
| Fly! 2K | Microsoft Windows | April 26, 2000 | Terminal Reality | |
| KISS: Psycho Circus – The Nightmare Child | Microsoft Windows | July 17, 2000 | Third Law Interactive | |
| Heavy Metal: F.A.K.K.² | Mac OS | August 4, 2000 | Ritual Entertainment | |
| Heavy Metal: F.A.K.K.² | Microsoft Windows | August 4, 2000 | Ritual Entertainment | |
| Blair Witch Volume I: Rustin Parr | Microsoft Windows | October 4, 2000 | Terminal Reality | |
| 4x4 Evolution | Mac OS | October 30, 2000 | Terminal Reality | |
| 4x4 Evolution | Microsoft Windows | October 30, 2000 | Terminal Reality | |
| Rune | Microsoft Windows | October 30, 2000 | Human Head Studios | |
| 4x4 Evolution | Dreamcast | October 31, 2000 | Terminal Reality | |
| Blair Witch Volume II: The Legend of Coffin Rock | Microsoft Windows | October 31, 2000 | Human Head Studios | |
| Blair Witch Volume III: The Elly Kedward Tale | Microsoft Windows | November 22, 2000 | Ritual Entertainment | |
| Rune | Mac OS | December 12, 2000 | Human Head Studios | |
| Kingdom Under Fire: A War of Heroes | Microsoft Windows | January 18, 2001 | Phantagram | |
| Oni | Mac OS | January 29, 2001 | Bungie | |
| Oni | Microsoft Windows | January 29, 2001 | Bungie | |
| 4x4 Evolution | PlayStation 2 | February 27, 2001 | Terminal Reality | |
| Serious Sam: The First Encounter | Microsoft Windows | March 23, 2001 | Croteam | |
| Tropico | Microsoft Windows | April 24, 2001 | PopTop Software | |
| Fly! II | Mac OS | April 26, 2001 | Terminal Reality | |
| Fly! II | Microsoft Windows | April 26, 2001 | Terminal Reality | |
| Rune: Halls of Valhalla | Microsoft Windows | April 26, 2001 | Human Head Studios | |
| Rune | Linux | June 21, 2001 | Loki Entertainment Software | |
| Max Payne | Microsoft Windows | July 23, 2001 | Remedy Entertainment / 3D Realms | |
| Tropico | Mac OS | August 23, 2001 | Feral Interactive | |
| Rune: Halls of Valhalla | Mac OS | August 24, 2001 | Westlake Interactive | |
| Rune: Halls of Valhalla | Linux | August 24, 2001 | Loki Entertainment Software | |
| Stronghold | Microsoft Windows | October 22, 2001 | Firefly Studios | |
| 4x4 EVO 2 | Microsoft Windows | October 30, 2001 | Terminal Reality | |
| Heavy Metal: F.A.K.K.² | Linux | November 14, 2001 | Loki Entertainment Software | |
| 4x4 EVO 2 | Xbox | November 15, 2001 | Terminal Reality | |
| Myth III: The Wolf Age | Microsoft Windows | November 26, 2001 | MumboJumbo | |
| Myth III: The Wolf Age | Mac OS | January 15, 2002 | MacSoft | |
| Tropico: Paradise Island | Microsoft Windows | February 4, 2002 | BreakAway Games | |
| Serious Sam: The Second Encounter | Microsoft Windows | February 5, 2002 | Croteam | |
| 4x4 EVO 2 | Mac OS | March 20, 2002 | Aspyr | |
| Stronghold | macOS | May 17, 2002 | MacSoft | |
| Age of Wonders II: The Wizard's Throne | Microsoft Windows | June 12, 2002 | Triumph Studios / PopTop Software | |
| Max Payne | macOS | July 16, 2002 | Feral Interactive | |
| Mafia | Microsoft Windows | August 28, 2002 | Illusion Softworks | |
| Stronghold: Crusader | Microsoft Windows | September 27, 2002 | Firefly Studios | |
| Vietcong | Microsoft Windows | March 27, 2003 | Pterodon / Illusion Softworks | |
| Tropico 2: Pirate Cove | Microsoft Windows | April 11, 2003 | Frog City Software / PopTop Software | |
| Age of Wonders: Shadow Magic | Microsoft Windows | July 25, 2003 | Triumph Studios | |
| Space Colony | Microsoft Windows | October 14, 2003 | Firefly Studios | |
| Hidden & Dangerous 2 | Microsoft Windows | October 21, 2003 | Illusion Softworks | |
| Railroad Tycoon 3 | Microsoft Windows | October 27, 2003 | PopTop Software | |
| Mafia | PlayStation 2 | January 28, 2004 | Illusion Softworks | |
| Vietcong: Fist Alpha | Microsoft Windows | February 4, 2004 | Pterodon / Illusion Softworks | |
| Mafia | Xbox | March 8, 2004 | Illusion Softworks | |
| Destruction Derby: Arenas | PlayStation 2 | June 7, 2004 | Studio 33 | |
| Space Colony | macOS | June 22, 2004 | Aspyr | |
| Gotcha! Extreme Paintball | Microsoft Windows, Xbox | July 30, 2004 | Sixteen Tons Entertainment | |
| Railroad Tycoon 3: Coast to Coast | Microsoft Windows | August 20, 2004 | PopTop Software | |
| The Guy Game | Xbox | August 30, 2004 | Topheavy Studios | |
| The Guy Game | PlayStation 2 | August 31, 2004 | Atomic Planet Entertainment | |
| Wings of War | Microsoft Windows | September 1, 2004 | Silver Wish Games | |
| Wings of War | Xbox | September 1, 2004 | Silver Wish Games | |
| Railroad Tycoon 3 | macOS | September 13, 2004 | MacSoft | |
| Vietcong: Purple Haze | PlayStation 2 | September 15, 2004 | Coyote Developments | |
| Vietcong: Purple Haze | Xbox | September 15, 2004 | Coyote Developments | |
| The Guy Game | Microsoft Windows | December 22, 2004 | Topheavy Studios | |
| Vietcong: Red Dawn | Microsoft Windows | March 21, 2005 | Pterodon / Illusion Softworks | |
| Tropico 2: Pirate Cove | macOS | May 17, 2005 | MacSoft | |

=== Under the On Deck Interactive label ===
| Title | Platform(s) | Release date | Developer | Ref. |
|---|---|---|---|---|
| Bugdom | Microsoft Windows | October 27, 2000 | Hoptile Research | |
| KISS Pinball | Microsoft Windows | November 3, 2000 | Wildfire Studios | |
| Soul Ride | Microsoft Windows | November 4, 2000 | Slingshot Game Technology | |
| Motocross Mania | Microsoft Windows | November 14, 2000 | Deibus Studios | |
| The Ward | Microsoft Windows | January 23, 2001 | Fragile Bits | |
