= Stronghold Kingdoms =

2012 video game

- Developer: Firefly Studios
- Publisher: Firefly Studios
- Producers: Eric Ouellette; Paul Harris; Mark Barney
- Designers: Simon Bradbury; Eric Ouellette
- Artists: Darrin Horbal; Tom Ward
- Series: Stronghold
- Platforms: Windows, OS X, iOS, Android
- Release: Microsoft Windows: WW: 17 October 2012; OS X: WW: 19 January 2015; iOS: WW: 15 August 2017; Android: WW: 31 August 2017
- Genre: Massively multiplayer online real-time strategy
- Mode: Multiplayer

Stronghold Kingdoms is a 2012 massively multiplayer online real-time strategy game video game with a Medieval castle building theme. It was an installment in the Stronghold series of games. It is the first game in the MMO genre to be developed by Firefly Studios.

== Development ==
Work on the game began with a small team of developers in 2007, the early alpha phase was started at the beginning of 2009, after which testers were able to play in a closed setting for the first time. The first alpha test began in 2009 and was open to 150 players. From November 2010, an open beta ran for almost two years until the game was officially released on 17 October 2012 when it achieved gold status.

== Reception ==
Stronghold Kingdoms has achieved a Metacritic score of 75, indicating generally favorable reviews.

Strategy Informer gave a score of 85/100, with reviewer Emmanuel Brown describing it as "mission accomplished" and saying that "for the most part, they get it absolutely right." Gaming XP's review praised how the classic Stronghold format was "implemented very well for this MMO".
