= Firefly Studios =

British video game developer

Firefly Studios Limited
- Type: Subsidiary
- Industry: Video games
- Founded: August 1999; 27 years ago
- Founders: Simon Bradbury; David Lester; Eric Ouellette
- Headquarters: London, England
- Key people: Simon Bradbury; Eric Ouellette
- Products: Stronghold series
- Number of employees: 39 (2022)
- Parent: Devolver Digital (2021–present)
- Website: fireflyworlds.com

Firefly Studios Limited (also stylized as FireFly Studios) is a British video game developer based in London. Formed in August 1999 by Simon Bradbury, David Lester, and Eric Ouellette, the company focuses on historic real-time strategy games for the PC and Macintosh systems. They are best known for their Stronghold series of games. In June 2021, the studio was acquired by Devolver Digital.

== History ==
Firefly Studios was established in August 1999 by Simon Bradbury, David Lester, and Eric Ouellette, who met while working at Impressions Games. The studio released its first game, Stronghold, in 2001, to critical and commercial success. The following year they released its successor, Stronghold Crusader, also to critical and commercial success.

The later Stronghold releases, Stronghold 2 (2005), and Stronghold Legends (2006), both received poor reviews and were given Metacritic scores of 63 percent and 57 percent respectively. The last of the series, Stronghold: Crusader Extreme (2008), received an average score of 40 percent on Metacritic. Around this time, the studio began a collaboration with Firaxis Games that produced CivCity: Rome, a game that received poor reviews and was the last Firefly game published by Take-Two Interactive.

In 2008, Firefly announced that they would be working on Stronghold 3 followed by Crusader II because of demand from fans. The studio later canceled the release of the planned Dungeon Hero game. In 2009, when asked if they had any other unannounced games in development besides Dungeon Hero and Stronghold Kingdoms, the studio responded that they still had one more game in development. A subsequent newsletter stated that the studio had "something very big in the pipeline" which would be revealed in 2010.

Stronghold 3 was officially announced on 14 May 2010 by SouthPeak Games, and was released in October 2011. The game received some criticism on gaming sites for game bugs. Fans pointed to various issues, including the difficulty involved with building walls and the absence of a skirmish mode.

More recent games included Stronghold Crusader II, the sequel to their 2002 game Stronghold: Crusader. The lead designer at Firefly Studios, Simon Bradbury, stated that the title was "our favorite game, it's our fans' favorite game and it's the game we have been waiting to put into production for several long years now." The title was initially scheduled for release in early 2013 but due to delays was not released until 23 September 2014.

Despite the uneven success of some of its games, the studio continues to develop new games and has sold over seven million copies to date. The Stronghold Kingdoms series retains a following with over eight million registered players.

The publisher Devolver Digital acquired Firefly Studios on 24 June 2021. While Devolver Digital had not published any Firefly Studios games, the studio had previously worked with Gathering of Developers and Gamecock Media Group, both co-founded by Devolver's founders.

== Recent activities ==
Dungeon Hero had been in development for several years and was scheduled for release in 2009 on both PC and Xbox 360 systems. The game was originally going to be published by Gamecock Media Group, but after that company was bought out by SouthPeak Games in October 2008, a legal dispute on the subject of ownership of the game stopped its release. Dungeon Hero is currently without a publisher, despite SouthPeak publishing every other Gamecock title due for release. Firefly Studios has announced that the title is on hold, and several planned release dates have passed without release. The lack of clarity on the issue has fueled speculation that the game may be published as a vaporware title in the future.

Stronghold: Warlords, initially announced by Firefly Studios as Stronghold: Next, was released on 9 March 2021.

Stronghold: Definitive Edition has been announced by Firefly Studios and was released on November 7th 2023.

== Games ==
Year	Game
2001	Stronghold
2002	Stronghold: Crusader
2003	Space Colony
2005	Stronghold 2
2006	CivCity: Rome
2006	Stronghold Legends
2008	Stronghold: Crusader Extreme
2009	Stronghold Kingdoms
2011	Stronghold 3
2012	Stronghold HD
2012	Stronghold: Crusader HD
2012	Space Colony HD
2014	Stronghold Crusader II
2015	Space Colony: Steam Edition
2016	Wonky Tower
2016	Stronghold Legends: Steam Edition
2017	Stronghold 2: Steam Edition
2017	Stronghold Kingdoms: Mobile Edition
2017	MetaMorph: Dungeon Creatures
2021	Stronghold: Warlords
2022	Romans: Age of Caesar
2023	Stronghold: Definitive Edition
2025	Stronghold Crusader: Definitive Edition
2027	Fool King

=== In development ===
- Stronghold 4 starting December 7, 2026, will be in Early access.

=== Cancelled ===
- Dungeon Hero
