= Stronghold 2 =

2005 video game

- box art featuring Sir William
- Developer: Firefly Studios
- Publishers: 2K; Firefly Studios (Steam)
- Designer: Simon Bradbury
- Programmers: Andrew Prime; Will Wilson; Warrick Buchanan; Andrew McNab; Bob Kang
- Artists: Darren White; Robert Thornley; Jorge Cameo; Jason Juta
- Writers: Simon Bradbury; Casimir C. Windsor
- Composer: Robert L. Euvino
- Series: Stronghold
- Platform: Microsoft Windows
- Release: NA: 19 April 2005; EU: 22 April 2005; WW: 5 October 2017 (Steam)
- Genre: Real-time strategy
- Modes: Single-player, multiplayer

Stronghold 2 is a 2005 real-time strategy video game developed by Firefly Studios and originally published by 2K for Windows. The third installment of the Stronghold series and the sequel to Stronghold, the player again develops a stronghold in the Middle Ages.

The game engine was enhanced over the original Stronghold to provide full 3-dimensional graphics. Other changes include new military and peace campaigns and the addition of crime and punishment, allowing players to torture unruly peasants. A number of new characters were also introduced.

On 5 October 2017, Stronghold 2 was re-released digitally on Steam by Firefly Studios as Stronghold 2: Steam Edition. It is available as a standalone title or as a free upgrade for owners of the Stronghold Collection on Steam. The re-release includes the following new features and improvements: Steam multiplayer, 16:9 Widescreen resolution support, visual enhancements to the in-game textures, six new maps, the ability to share and download custom maps through the Steam Workshop, Achievements, and digital versions of the official art book and soundtrack.

== Gameplay ==
In the game, players take on the role of a lord who rules over a medieval castle. With their available resources, players place buildings or features, including many different kinds of food production, industry, civil, or military buildings and defences. Available peasants automatically choose jobs whenever a building requires one, so player micromanagement is minimal; players mostly set up the various buildings in an efficient way while providing safety for their peasants. Military units are directly controlled individually or in groups, sometimes quite large with sieges or battles involving many hundreds on each side. One addition to the original Stronghold is the inclusion of estates that players can "buy" with their accumulated honor (gained by popularity, holding feasts, dances, jousting, etc.). Estates are semi-independent villages (without castle fortifications) that produce their own goods that owners can send via cart to their castle or allies.

The inclusion of fully 3D-rendered graphics allowed Stronghold 2 to include tower interiors as battlegrounds for units, and the ability to go observe castle inhabitants very closely, which is useful for the new features of waste and rat management. As in the original Stronghold, players can choose from several different play modes: Kingmaker, Siege, War Campaign, Peace Campaign, Freeplay, Custom scenario, and Multiplayer

From May 2014, the original version's multiplayer is no longer supported due to GameSpy shutting down their online servers however the 2017 re-release on Steam has full multiplayer support via Steam's online servers.

== Plot ==
In 11th-12th century medieval England, the King mysteriously disappears, leaving the country without rule and descending it into turmoil. Among the chaos, a valiant knight called Sir William is poised to find his master at any cost, with Matthew Steele (protagonist), a page on his side. While an influential warlord, Lord Barclay is keen on filling the gap in order, other participants show up over time unfolding their cards. The player commands Steele into William's campaign, eventually growing in rank high enough to be a player in politics.

== Reception ==
Reception

Aggregate score
Aggregator	Score
Metacritic	63/100

Review scores
Publication	Score
1Up.com	C
Computer Games Magazine	2/5
Computer Gaming World	2/5
Eurogamer	7/10
Game Informer	6.75/10
GameSpot	5.9/10
GameSpy	2.5/5
GameZone	8/10
IGN	6.7/10
PC Gamer (US)	84%
The Sydney Morning Herald	3.5/5

The game received "mixed" reviews according to the review aggregation website Metacritic.

According to Edge, Stronghold 2 sold at least 100,000 units in the U.S., but was beaten by its predecessor's 220,000 sales in the region. Total US sales of Stronghold games released during the 2000s reached 590,000 units by August 2006.
