= Semblance =

Semblance may refer to:

- Semblance (video game), a 2018 video game by Nyamakop
- Semblance analysis, a process used in the refinement and study of seismic data
