= Showgunners =

- Developer: Artificer
- Publisher: Good Shepherd Entertainment
- Director: Kacper Szymczak
- Producer: Sebastian Hitchinson
- Designer: Jan Rawski
- Programmer: Sebastian Gorazo
- Artist: Grzegorz Przybyś
- Writers: Olga Ilukowicz; Evan Skolnick
- Composers: Paweł Błaszczak; Mikolai Stroinski; P.T. Adamczyk; Alexander Brandon; Max Lombardo; Jacek Paciorkowski; Marcin Przybyłowicz
- Platform: Windows
- Release: WW: May 2, 2023
- Genre: Turn-based tactics
- Mode: Single-player

Showgunners is a turn-based tactics video game developed by Artificer and published by Good Shepherd Entertainment. Players control a contestant on a brutal game show where people fight to the death. It was released on Windows in May 2023.

== Gameplay ==
In a dystopian future, contestants fight to the death in modern gladiator battles on the game show Homicidal All-Stars. Players control a contestant named Scarlett, an ex-cop seeking revenge. Scarlett must be guided through turn-based, tactical battles to reach her target. There is no fog of war; all enemies are visible on the map. Distant attacks are affected by random chance, but melee attacks always hit. Each combatant has two action points, which can be used for moving, attacking, or using special abilities. Each action taken costs an action point, though attacking ends a character's turn. The show's host can add additional threats if he believes Scarlett is not being challenged enough. Characters who are defeated in combat revive afterward.

Outside combat, players must avoid traps and solve puzzles in real-time. They can also sign autographs for fans, which increases their fame and can lead to sponsorships. Each sponsor, who can offer unique rewards, has different preferences for behavior, so friendly or arrogant behavior toward fans can attract different sponsorships. Between battles on the show, players can interact with other contestants and learn more about why Scarlett became a contestant. Players can recruit additional characters to join Scarlett, though teams are typically limited to three members at a time. As Scarlett and her teammates win battles, they gain special abilities, and each character can have one cybernetic implant. Players can gain new equipment by completing challenges, such as killing multiple people at once, though each character is restricted to using only the type of weapon they specialize in.

== Development ==
The development studio, Artificer, was formed by former employees of CreativeForge Games. The developers were influenced by early 1990s science fiction and wanted to create a retrofuturistic setting reminiscent of that era's cyberpunk works. The setting of a deadly TV game show came about when their producer suggested that it would give them the most creative freedom. The team agreed, reasoning that the "anything goes" nature of game shows like Takeshi's Castle could make any level design seem believable. Compared to Hard West, Artificer said they wanted their new game to be fast, brutal, and streamlined. It was developed in Poland. Good Shepherd Entertainment released Showgunners for Windows on May 2, 2023. It was originally known as Homicidal All-Stars.

== Reception ==
Showgunners received positive reviews on Metacritic. Though critical of the streamlined combat mechanics, NME called it "fun and entertaining" and recommended it to people who want to play something less complex than the XCOM series. PC Games found Showgunners to be well designed and similarly recommended it to those seeking a less complex take on the XCOM formula. CD-Action recommended the game overall but found it a bit repetitious. Several reviews criticized the game for having little replay value, though Sports Illustrated said players looking for a combat-oriented game will get their money's worth despite this.
