= Dawn of the Monsters =

2022 video game

- Developer: 13AM Games
- Publisher: WayForward
- Director: Alex Rushdy
- Producer: Steph Sandercock
- Designer: Justin Fernandes
- Programmer: Marty Kugler
- Artist: Takashi
- Writer: Unai Cabezón
- Composer: Dan Rodrigues
- Platforms: Windows; Nintendo Switch; PlayStation 4; PlayStation 5; Xbox One; Xbox Series X/S; Stadia
- Release: March 1, 2022: Google Stadia; March 1, 2022; Windows, Switch, PlayStation 4, PS5, Xbox One, Xbox Series X/S; March 15, 2022
- Genre: Beat'em up
- Modes: Single-player, multiplayer

Dawn of the Monsters is a beat'em up video game developed by 13AM Games and published by WayForward. The game was released in March 2022 for Windows, Nintendo Switch, PlayStation 4, PlayStation 5, Xbox One, Xbox Series X/S, and Google Stadia. The game received generally positive reviews upon release.

== Plot ==
In 2036, three decades prior to the game's events, in the wake of a climate catastrophe, enormous monsters known as the Nephilim invade Earth and cause massive destruction around the globe, prompting the creation of DAWN (Defense Alliance Worldwide Network) the following year. The game, which takes place in 2065, follows the efforts of DAWN, under its Logistics Director, Captain Claire Lionne, to liberate the world of Nephilim, by destroying the "nests" and "Monarchs" (head Nephilim) in the cities of Toronto, Foz do Iguaçu, Cairo, and Tokyo, with the help of its four agents: the first-wave Nephilim Megadon and Ganira, Eiji Murasame, who can transform into the giant superhero Aegis Prime, and Jamila Senai, pilot of the ATOM (Atomic Telekinetically Operated Mecha) called Tempest Galahad. Aid is provided by DAWN's lead scientist, Dr. Viktor Ivakin, and the head of DAWN's Intelligence Department, Dr. Sofia Cruces.

By the time of the second campaign in South America, Captain Lionne is questioned for her secrecy regarding various aspects of DAWN (especially regarding how they are able to control Megadon and Ganira), and Syncor (DAWN's main technology provider and manufacturer of ATOMs), formerly under DAWN Commander-in-Chief Conrad Fosco, is suspiciously believed to have a connection with the Nephilim attacks. During the third campaign in Cairo, a Nephilim-attracting device is discovered, a rogue ATOM named Quake Quixote attacks, and Megadon and Ganira are revealed to be "operated" in secret by the orphaned twins Kohara and Kiwa under "Project Raven", an experiment that allows for telepathic communication between psychic children and certain Nephilim. By the end of the Tokyo campaign, DAWN retrieves all of the files of Goro Maki, the predecessor of Dr. Cruces who mysteriously disappeared before the events of the game, while Syncor's mass-produced Avalanche series ATOMs betray and assault DAWNs agents. Shortly after the fall of the last Monarch in Mount Fuji, Claire heads to Earth to confront the corruption within Syncor and DAWN, only to be ambushed and killed by Syncor's ATOMs.

The game's final campaign results in DAWN attacking Nephilim hordes (among them, copies of Megadon, Ganira, and the slain Monarchs) and ATOM units, storming Syncor's base in a Sheol pool within the Bermuda Triangle following a spike in energy levels threatening to xenoform Earth and end all life on the planet. Fosco is killed trying to bring forth Azrael, the primordial Harbinger of the Nephilim, who is then promptly defeated by DAWN's agents. Soon after, Megadon and Ganira briefly attack Aegis Prime and Tempest Galahad before leaving, with Kiwa and Kohara revealing that the two monsters were never under control, and were only opposing Azrael and helping DAWN by their own will, communicating through them. With the Nephilim threat over, Eiji and Jamila go into hiding, their mission completed.

The end credits, post-game documents, and arcade endings imply that Azrael may still be alive, and reveal that Dr. Ivakin has retired to be with his family, Kiwa and Kohara live with director Sofia Cruces in an institute set up to honor Claire Lionne, Eiji continues to keep a close eye on his family even while living alone in secrecy, and a new mecha, the combining ATOM Meteor Temujin, is built.

== Gameplay ==
Dawn of the Monsters is a 2.5D side-scrolling beat'em up video game similar to Streets of Rage and Final Fight, though the game also has features commonly found in fighting games. The player combats kaiju known as "Nephilim" with one of five characters.

- Megadon, the "Living Volcano" - An aggressive, territorial, volcanic Godzilla-like saurian that can increase his attack power by raising his temperature, the first Nephilim to awaken. He is telepathically linked to Test Subject #23 ("Kohara").
- Ganira, "Terror of the Seas" - A bipedal crustacean-esque Nephilim with a hard exoskeleton, the ability to summon crab-like minions, or attack with steam or tsunamis. She is telepathically linked to Test Subject #24 ("Kiwa").
- Aegis Prime, the "Superhuman Warrior" - An Ultraman-like titan and DAWN's first agent, alter-ego of the physicist Eiji Murasame, who can turn giant by will after being mutated by a Sheol pool south of Bermuda.
- Tempest Galahad, the "Apex of ATOM Technology" - Piloted by Jamila Senai, who lost her parents and her right arm in a Nephilim "Triple Event" in Cairo during her childhood, it is the first and strongest known combat-ready ATOM, equipped with hand cannons, mines, and the "Mk. XIV Ultimate Laser Cannon". Inspired by the Evangelions and the Jaegers from Pacific Rim.
- Meteor Temujin, the "Combining Mecha" - A Super Sentai/Power Rangers-inspired robot made from the remains of prototype ATOMs by Team Meteor (Grace Galvan, Ray, Gretta, and Brianna), equipped with an energy sword, an electric axe, and a massive hammer.

Each character has light attacks, heavy attacks (which can be held down to perform "heavy holds"), dash attacks, and the ability to block, dodge, and grab objects to swing or throw them at enemies. They also have five (which can be upgraded to ten) bars of "Rage", which can be built up by attacking enemies and buildings, and also by getting damaged. One or two bars of Rage can be used to perform one of three character-exclusive "Rage Attacks", some of which can inflict status effects like Burn (damage over time), Shock (paralysis), Erode (decreases defense), and Drench (reduces attack and movement speed), enhance the character's power, speed, defense, cancel attacks, or even alter how some attacks are performed as well as the effects they have (for example, by loading ammunition, or changing the weapon the character has equipped). One bar of Rage can also be used to revive defeated players (in multiplayer), or execute weakened enemies (which heals the player by a certain amount in the process). Doing Rage attacks fills up a "Cataclysm" meter, which can be used to unleash the character's devastating ultimate attack. To further enhance the characters, the player can pick up to three augments (upgrades which are unlocked throughout the game), which can be used to grant a character special advantages, as well as boost strength, defense, speed, critical attack chance and damage, rage generation, or vampirism (which adds health-stealing effects to attacks). The player can also visit an in-game inventory and buy upgrades to increase health, add Rage bars, and double the Cataclysm meter.

The player's performance is rated per encounter in the stage, based on their score, which can be enhanced by a gradually-decreasing multiplier that is dependent on maintaining combos, and can be temporarily prevented from decreasing by executing or overkilling enemies. Some encounters, however, lack a multiplier, and are instead rated by how fast it takes for the player to beat. By the end of the level, the performance off all the encounters in a stage are then tallied, resulting in a ranking from F to S+ (which requires the extra condition that the player does not die in the level). The player is also shown four augments (the tier - and therefore, the strength - of which is dependent on the rank attained within the level), and is presented the choice to either choose two of the four, or sell them instead. The game's campaign features 35 different levels and takes place in five major locations (Toronto, Foz do Iguaçu, Cairo, Tokyo, and the Hatteras Abyssal Plain below the Bermuda Triangle). In addition to the single player, the game also supports two-player local cooperative multiplayer.

The game also has one downloadable content (DLC) pack, which offers an arcade mode, 50 new character skins, a new playable character, Meteor Temujin, as well as a free update that adds Japanese dubbing, ten unique Trials (short challenge levels), four new difficulty levels ranging from New Game+ to New Game++++ (which raise the attack power and health of enemies), and additional achievements (challenges).

== Development ==
Dawn of the Monsters was developed by Canadian game studio 13AM Games. The team first had the idea of making a kaiju game in early 2016, though no publisher was willing to fund the title and the team shifted their attention to make Double Cross. Following the release of that game in 2019, 13AM developed a prototype of Dawn of the Monsters, and successfully pitched the game to WayForward at E3. WayForward announced the partnership with 13AM Games in October 2020. Originally set to be released in late 2021, the game was delayed and subsequently released digitally for Windows, Nintendo Switch, PlayStation 4, PlayStation 5, Xbox One and Xbox Series X and Series S on March 15, 2022. Limited Run Games will release a physical edition of the game.

The game's artstyle was inspired by comic books. It was designed to be "striking" and "evocative" of imagery from kaiju movie posters. Director Alex Rushdy described the art style as a mashup of Japanese manga and the works of Mike Mignola, the creator of Hellboy. To ensure that the team had a consistent vision of the game's tone, Rushdy organised movie nights in which the team would watch movies such as Godzilla (1954) and Gamera, while inspiration is also taken from King Kong, Ultraman, Neon Genesis Evangelion, Pacific Rim, and even other franchises not directly related to the kaiju genre. The team also invited numerous artists to collaborate on the game. Shinji Nishikawa, who was involved in the design of several Godzilla films and helped the team design the Tokyo Monarch Agnitor. Yuji Kaida, who served as an illustrator on multiple kaiju projects, designed the cover for the game's physical edition. Lastly, Matt Frank, who worked on official Godzilla, Ultraman, and Transformers comics, contributed key art and illustrations for the game's physical collector's edition, and made the alpha Nephilim Inazudon and Bakudon, both of which first appeared in the Cairo campaign. E. J. Su and Zander Cannon were involved in the production of the game's promotional materials, with Su creating the game's key art and even working on the game's prequel comic. Powerhouse Animation Studios created the game's animated opening sequence.

In April 2023, a poll was held to decide the game's first additional character, with the three choices being the Daimajin-inspired colossus Daizosan, the forest-covered King Kong-esque Ziranoth, and a combining mecha based on Super Sentai/Power Rangers, Meteor Temujin, with the last of the three being voted for the game's first DLC, which also introduced an arcade mode, and 50 new character skins, further bolstered by a free update with Japanese dubbing, ten unique Trials (short challenge levels), four difficulty levels, and new challenges.

== Reception ==
Reception

Aggregate score
Aggregator	Score
Metacritic	PS5: 76/100; NS: 81/100

Review scores
Publication	Score
Destructoid	6.5/10
Nintendo Life	8/10
Nintendo World Report	8/10
TouchArcade	4/5

Dawn of the Monsters received "generally favorable" reviews according to review aggregator Metacritic.

Stuart Gipp from Nintendo Life praised the extensive customization options and augments, which added variations to the game. However, he was disappointed by the repetitive stage design, and the stiff animation. Writing for Destructoid, Chris Moyse strongly commended the game's visuals and described it as "dazzling" and "one of the finest 2D releases in years". While he enjoyed the combat system for its depth and complexity, he believed that the game failed to present enough challenges to players. Shaun Musgrave from TouchArcade agreed that the game slowly became repetitive, though he recommended the game for its solid gameplay mechanics and its premise. He concluded his review by writing "fans of either beat-em-ups or giant monsters will want to grab this game sharpish and get to smashing and demolishing the enemy forces".
