= Transport Fever (video game) =

2016 transport simulation video game

- Cover art
- Developer: Urban Games
- Publisher: Gambitious Digital Entertainment
- Series: Transport Fever
- Platforms: Microsoft Windows; macOS; Linux
- Release: WW: 8 November 2016
- Genre: Business simulation
- Mode: Single-Player

Transport Fever is a business simulation game developed by Urban Games and published by Gambitious Digital Entertainment. It is the second video game of the Transport Fever franchise, and was available worldwide for Microsoft Windows and macOS on 8 November 2016.

== Gameplay ==
Like its predecessor Train Fever, Transport Fever focuses on traffic simulation, but offers more varieties of transport vehicles, including buses, trains, ships and planes. The game starts in 1850 and allows players to simulate periods up to the game's release, experiencing over 150 years of transportation history. New and better transport vehicles will be released gradually until the year 2014. The game also features American and European campaigns, each providing seven challenges that inform players about the historical context of transportation during the 19th and 20th century.

== Development ==
Transport Fever was revealed in April 2016. It was developed by Urban Games, which was the developer of the Transport Fever franchise. The game was released on 8 November 2016 worldwide for Microsoft Windows.

== Reception ==
Reception

Aggregate score
Aggregator	Score
Metacritic	71/100

Review scores
Publication	Score
4Players	79/100
GameStar	83/100
PC Games (DE)	8/10

Transport Fever received "fairly positive" reviews, according to review aggregator platform Metacritic.

Sergio Brinkhuis of Hooked Gamers writes that in comparison to its predecessor Train Fever, the game improved in almost every term of aspects. However, time progression in the game is a bit off. He also criticises the time system that "travel time versus distance is completely out of whack and a day in the game lasts mere seconds."

The highest score among the thirteen reviews comes from GameStar. Benjamin Danneberg praises that the game offers better cargo systems and good new transports, but the controls are still flawed.
