= Virtual Boy Wario Land =

1995 platform game

- North American cover art
- Developer: Nintendo R&D1
- Publisher: Nintendo
- Directors: Hiroji Kiyotake; Hirofumi Matsuoka
- Producer: Gunpei Yokoi
- Programmer: Satoshi Matsumura
- Composer: Kazumi Totaka
- Series: Wario Land
- Platform: Virtual Boy
- Release: NA: November 27, 1995; JP: December 1, 1995
- Genre: Platform
- Mode: Single-player

Virtual Boy Wario Land (Note: Known in Japan as Virtual Boy Wario Land: The Secret Treasure of Awazon (Japanese: バーチャルボーイワリオランド アワゾンの秘宝, Hepburn: Bācharu Bōi Wario Rando: Awazon no Hihō)) is a 1995 platform game developed and published by Nintendo for the Virtual Boy. It stars Wario, who finds himself deep underground after stumbling upon a treasure-filled cave and must find his way back to the surface. Throughout the journey, the player explores and searches for items and power-ups while fighting enemies and defeating bosses. Wario has the ability to jump between the background and foreground at certain points, making use of Virtual Boy's stereoscopic 3D effect.

Virtual Boy Wario Land was developed by a large portion of Nintendo R&D1 staff involved. It was co-directed by Hiroji Kiyotake and Hirofumi Matsuoka and produced by Gunpei Yokoi. The music was composed by Kazumi Totaka, being his final project at R&D1. The game received generally favorable reviews, particularly in retrospect coverage, receiving praise for its gameplay and 3D depth, but criticism focused on its short length. Retrospectively, it has been lauded as one of the best Virtual Boy games and its background gimmick served as inspiration for games including Donkey Kong Country Returns (2010) and Mutant Mudds (2012).

== Gameplay ==
Wario running atop a jump pad on the first floor, with enemies in the foreground while coins and blocks can be seen in the background

Following the gameplay of Wario Land: Super Mario Land 3, Virtual Boy Wario Land is a side-scrolling platform game starring Wario. The premise follows Wario on vacation in the Awazon river basin, relaxing at the Aldegara waterfall. After being woken up by a beaver, Wario notices strange creatures entering behind the waterfall and decides to follow them. Wario stumbles upon a cave full of treasure and attempts to claim it as his own, however, he collapses deep underground and must find his way back to the surface.

The player controls Wario across 14 floors consisting of non-linear levels. The goal of each level is to collect treasures and find a key to unlock an elevator to the next floor. Wario can jump or run into enemies to knock them down. Stunned enemies can be picked up and thrown at other enemies or clouds that give coins. Wario can also perform a shoulder charge or body slam to attack enemies and break blocks. There are three power-ups Wario can equip, including a bull hat that increases his strength, an eagle hat that allows him to fly and attack in the air, and a fire-breathing dragon hat. Wario can combine the eagle and dragon hats into the "King Dragon" hat, granting him all three skills.

Wario has the ability to leap between the background and foreground using jump pads. In most levels, the player needs to navigate between the two planes to explore and search for items, or avoid enemies and obstacles that move between the planes. If Wario takes damage, he will shrink, losing his power until he picks up a clove of garlic or a hat. If Wario is hit while small, he loses a life and all the coins he had collected in that level. Every three floors, Wario must fight bosses that make use of the Virtual Boy's stereoscopic 3D effect. Between floors there are mini-games where Wario can gamble the loot he has collected so far. Each level in the game contains one of ten artifacts hidden inside secret chambers and the ending depends on whether Wario found them all as well as the coins he collected and how quickly the game was completed.

== Development and release ==
Virtual Boy Wario Land was developed by a large number of Nintendo R&D1 staff involved. It was co-directed by Hiroji Kiyotake and Hirofumi Matsuoka, who had previously served as director and artist on Mario Paint, and produced by Gunpei Yokoi. Satoshi Matsumura acted as one of the game's co-programmers, while the music and sound effects were composed by Kazumi Totaka, being his final project at R&D1. Totaka included a song called "Totaka's Song", an easter egg that he hides in most of the video games he composes, during the game's closing credits. Like all other Virtual Boy games, Virtual Boy Wario Land employs a red-and-black color scheme and uses parallax, an optical trick used to simulate 3D.

The game was first shown at E3 1995 under the name Wario Cruise, (Note: ワリオクルーズ (Wario Kurūzu)) intended for release on September 21, 1995, in Japan and October 1995 in North America. It also made another appearance at Shoshinkai 1995 under its final title, Virtual Boy Wario Land. The North American release was titled Wario's Treasure Hunt before launch. Nintendo published the game in North America in November 1995, followed by Japan on December 1, 1995.

Virtual Boy Wario Land was added to the Nintendo Classics service on February 17, 2026 for the Nintendo Switch. On July 31, 2026, the game's soundtrack was added to Nintendo Music.

== Reception ==
Reception

Review scores
Publication	Score
EP Daily	9/10
Famitsu	5/10, 8/10, 7/10, 7/10
Game Informer	7.75/10
N64 Magazine	93%
Next Generation	2/5
Official Nintendo Magazine	89/100
Game Zero Magazine	22.5/25

Virtual Boy Wario Land received generally favorable reception from critics upon release, with most criticism directed at the Virtual Boy hardware itself. Nintendo Power felt that the game made excellent use of the Virtual Boy hardware with some of the 3D graphics and gameplay elements. Los Angeles Times' Aaron Curtis found the game to be enjoyable but disliked the Virtual Boy's visual style, while Rocky Mountain News' Joel Easley said its use of 3D demonstrated the possibilities of the Virtual Boy. GamePro considered it the best Virtual Boy game, celebrating the quality of the characters and sound effects.

Dave Upchurch and Simon Clays of Nintendo Magazine System (Official Nintendo Magazine) praised the game's crisp visuals, audio department, and gameplay, but felt that the 3D effect was merely cosmetic and criticized its short length. Next Generation remarked that while it appealed to more "hardcore" Mario fans, it was not advanced compared to older Mario games and they felt the 3D mechanic did not add much to the game. Game Zero Magazine's Bryan Carter gave high remarks to the game's 3D graphics, soundscapes, controls, and longevity. N64 Magazine's Jason Moore wrote that "The VB was the most ignored and slated of all Nintendo consoles, yet Wario Land is a typical slice of Nintendo excellence and should have sold the machine by the million".

=== Retrospective coverage ===
Retrospective commentary for Virtual Boy Wario Land has been more favorable, being lauded as one of the best Virtual Boy games. Agustin Olvera and Stephen Smith of Kombo felt that its cavernous setting helped the Virtual Boy emphasize subtle visual details, while Play's Dave Halverson returned to the game often and praised it for not getting tiresome to replay. AllGame's Scott Alan Marriott found the game fun, highlighting Wario's controls and diverse moveset, as well as the detailed graphics and bosses, but noted its short duration. Nintendo Life's Dave Frear lauded the game's use of the 3D effect in the visual design and replayability, but lamented the lack of additional levels. Retro Gamer opined that the background gimmick helped enhance an otherwise "traditional" platformer, while the Australian video game talk show Good Game felt that more could have been done with its visuals.

Writing for 1Up.com and Nintendo World Report, Neal Ronaghan enjoyed the background gimmick but felt that it did not work as well as it could in exploring the concept. GamesRadar called Virtual Boy Wario Land a "legitimately awesome" platformer despite its lacking "3D" gimmick, while Kotaku's Ben Bertoli felt that it was unappreciated at release due to its platform. Polygon's Kyle Hilliard stated that, despite being less popular than all other Wario games, it was the best Wario game. He discussed how, even though it was his first time playing it, he felt nostalgic due to its use of familiar elements from the first Wario Land entry. He also praised the 3D effects, particularly the boss battles. Several outlets hoped to see it re-released on other Nintendo platforms, specifically the Nintendo 3DS, including IGN, GamesRadar, Destructoid, and Retronauts.

== Legacy ==
Virtual Boy Wario Land inspired multiple games from several developers due to its background gimmick, including Donkey Kong Country Returns (2010) by Retro Studios, Mutant Mudds (2012) by Renegade Kid, and Shantae Advance: Risky Revolution (2025) by WayForward. In 2016, Renegade Kid co-founder Jools Watsham revealed that he proposed a color remake of the game for Nintendo 3DS to Nintendo but never received a response, reportedly due to Nintendo not wanting to revisit the Virtual Boy.
