= Double Cross =

Double Cross, Double Crossed, or their variants may refer to:

== Art, entertainment, and media ==
=== Heraldic ===
- Two-barred cross (‡)

=== Comics ===
- Double Cross, an issue of Buffy the Vampire Slayer collected in Food Chain
- Double Cross!, a comic by Tony Consiglio

=== Fictional entities ===
- The "Double-Cross" (of betrayal), the emblem of Hynkel's fascist regime in Charlie Chaplin's comedy film The Great Dictator (1940)

=== Film ===
- Double Cross, an installment of the 1940 Mysterious Doctor Satan film serial
- Double Cross (1941 film), a film by Albert H. Kelley
- Double Cross (1951 film), a film by Riccardo Freda
- Double Cross (1972 film), a Bollywood action film
- Double Cross (1992 film), a Japanese crime film also released under the title The Triple Cross
- Double Cross (2005 film), a Bollywood film
- Double-Cross (2014 film), a Ghanaian film
- Doublecross (1956 film), a British crime film starring Donald Houston
- Doublecrossed (1991), HBO television film about Barry Seal, starring Dennis Hopper

=== Games ===
- Double Cross, a segment game from The Price is Right
- Double Cross (video game), a 2019 video game developed by 13AM Games

=== Literature ===
- Double Cross (novel), a 2007 novel by James Patterson
- Double Cross, a novel in the Noughts & Crosses series by Malorie Blackman
- Double Cross: The Explosive, Inside Story of the Mobster Who Controlled America, a memoir of Sam Giancana by members of his family

=== Music ===
- Double Cross (album), a 1968 album by Hank Crawford
- The Double Cross, a 2011 album by Sloan
- The Double-Cross, an album by Tempest
- Double Cross, a track by Irish singer Mary Coughlan on the 1985 album Tired and Emotional

=== Television ===
- Double Cross (TV series), an American web television crime drama series
- "Double Cross" (Sliders), an episode of Sliders
- "Double-Cross" (CSI), an episode of CSI
- "Double Cross" (Spider-Noir), an episode of Spider-Noir

== Other uses ==
- Double cross (betrayal)
- Double cross stitch, a type of cross stitch embroidery
- Double Cross System, a Second World War counterespionage and deception operation of MI5
- Double Cross Vodka, a vodka originating from the Slovak Republic

== See also ==
- Coat of arms of Hungary
- Coat of arms of Lithuania
- Coat of arms of Slovakia
- Cross of Lorraine, a two-barred cross associated with the Free French during World War II
- Dagger (mark) (‡) or double dagger
- Patriarchal cross, a two-barred variant of the Christian cross, especially in the Eastern Orthodox Church
