= TF3 =

TF3 may refer to:

- Theaflavin digallate
- The promotional abbreviation for Transformers: Dark of the Moon, the third live-action Transformers film
- Time for Three string trio
- SS Train Ferry No. 3
- Transport Fever 3
