= Train Fever =

2014 video game

- Developer: Urban Games
- Publisher: Gambitious Digital Entertainment
- Director: Basil Weber
- Designers: Basil Weber; Urban Weber; Manu Mikael Oehler; Florian Keller
- Programmers: Urban Weber; Basil Weber
- Artists: Manu Mikael Oehler; Karl Heinrich Klein; Stephan Schweizer
- Composer: David Langhard
- Series: Transport Fever
- Platforms: Microsoft Windows, OS X, Linux
- Release: WW: 4 September 2014
- Genre: Business Simulation
- Mode: Single-Player

Train Fever is a business simulation game by Swiss developer Urban Games, funded via the crowdfunding platform Gambitious on 20 March 2012 for a total budget of €300,000 and therefore published digitally by Gambitious Digital Entertainment and to retail by Astragon.

Train Fever was made available for pre-order on 22 July 2014 and released on 4 September. On 8 November 2016 the successor, Transport Fever, was released: it is based on the same engine and has new transport types and larger map sizes.

The game is heavily inspired from other transport simulation games, such as Transport Tycoon, Railroad Tycoon and OpenTTD; and, to a lesser extent, Cities in Motion.

== Funding ==
On 22 June 2012, the Train Fever team announced that they would need to seek funding in order to be able to develop the final release of their game. It was decided to use a crowd-funding platform, although no name was given at that time. The first activities on Train Fever's Gambitious page were observed on 26 August. The crowd-funding campaign started officially on 1 September 2012. The original funding target was €300 000, split by €20 shares, with an initial equity of 60% for private investors. The deadline was fixed for 1 March 2013, for a total duration of six months.

On 14 October 2012, Train Fever lead developer announced that everyone investing €40 (2 shares) or more in the project will receive a copy of the final version of the game. On 27 October, a new gameplay video was released and announced on both the Gambitious project page and the official website.

Three months after the beginning of the campaign, on 12 December 2012, the campaign had reached 6.5% completion, with 70 investors and €20,000 invested. On 27 December 2012, Train Fever was accepted on Valve's Steam Greenlight, in the "Concept" section. Reception was very positive, allowing Train Fever to reach the first page of Steam Greenlight "Top Rated All Time" at beginning of February. At that time, the project was supported by 200 investors on Gambitious.

On 18 February 2013, eleven days before the campaign deadline, the Train Fever team announced that an institutional investor backed the project for a total of €50,000. As a consequence, several decisions were made:

- The target funding on Gambitious campaign was lowered from €300,000 to €250,000
- The equity for private investors was lowered from 60% to 50%. However, the same ratio of "equity percentage / money invested" was kept (1% of equity for €5,000 invested).
- The campaign deadline was moved to 31 March 2013, in order not to surprise investors with last-minute changes.
- The start of the development was moved to May 2013, with a new expected release date in May 2014.

On 25 February 2013, the Train Fever team announced that the game will be available at release on Windows, Mac OS X and Linux. On 2 March 2013, €155,000 was invested, with €95,000 remaining to find, and 29 days to the deadline. Finally, on 20 March 2013, the crowd-funding campaign reached its target of €250,000, with 651 investors.

== Development ==
At the beginning of the crowdfunding campaign in September 2012, Train Fever was already in development at a prototype stage. The initial release date was set for May 2014, and pushed back to Q3 2014 at the end of February 2014.

Train Fever was originally developed by two people, Urban and Basil Weber, but the team grew to three developers with two additional artists.

In August 2013, an update explained the major gaming design decisions taken by the team:

- At the beginning, Train Fever was focusing on passenger transport only, but due to requests from the community, it was developed to allow to transport of several cargo goods (coal, iron ore, steel, wood, stock, grain, oil and goods);
- The size of the playable map was enlarged to 256 square kilometers;
- The maximum number of vehicles for the release was set at 30 trains, and more than 30 buses, trucks and streetcars.

Since November 2013, several more updates added content, such as procedurally generated terrain, in addition to improved road and rail systems.

On 22 January 2014, another developer update explained more precisely the in-game freight simulation functions, welcoming feedback on the current implementation from the community. This update listed only six transportable goods out of the nine explained in the "major design decisions" update (stock, grain and steel were no longer listed as goods). Developers explained that this number will likely be increased through downloadable content and community-developed modifications.

The beta test was announced 30 June 2014, and planned between 14 and 24 July. The number of beta testers was limited, and the total number will be split equally between Gambitious supporters and newcomers. The test was done on Windows only, and a NDA signed by testers.

== Distribution ==
Train Fever is distributed online (on Steam and GOG.com). In German speaking countries, the game is also sold on physical media (published by Gambitious and Astragon Software GmbH).

== Gameplay ==
The game is a single-player game designed for 20 hours of gameplay in which the story-time runs from 1850 until 2050.

The game takes place in an environment comparable with Europe and the cities are procedurally generated and evolve accordingly. The player builds transport infrastructure like railroads and stations and has to maintain this infrastructure. The player also buys vehicles and creates routes. They need to develop their transport company, eventually becoming a transport empire.

=== Sound ===
The in-game soundtrack, totaling over 70 minutes, is entirely composed by Admiral James T., a Swiss solo musician from Winterthur.

== Successors ==
On 11 April 2016, Urban Games announced Transport Fever as a successor to Train Fever, described as a "next generation transport simulation game coming to PC on the 8 November 2016. Players build up a thriving transport company and create complex rail-road-water-air networks. In addition to the genre-typical endless game mode, two historical campaigns offer real world challenges from more than 150 years of transportation history". A video trailer for Transport Fever was also released on the same day.

Transport Fever was released on 8 November 2016. It is based on the same engine and has new transport types, larger map sizes and better gameplay.

A sequel to Transport Fever, titled Transport Fever 2, was announced on 24 April 2019 and released on 11 December 2019. The game features many new simulation elements, such as creating a procedurally-generated map at the user's discretion, the introduction of Asian transport vehicles including the 0 Series Shinkansen, and a brand new noise pollution element, the idea of which is that the population reduces with greater noise pollution, meaning the purchase of quieter vehicles is favourable. Console support was introduced in the course of game patching.

Transport Fever 3 was announced on 21 May 2025, with a planned release in 2026 for PC, PlayStation 5 and Xbox Series X|S.
