= Xeodrifter =

2014 video game

- Developers: Renegade Kid; Atooi (Switch)
- Publishers: Renegade Kid; Gambitious Digital Entertainment (PS4, PS Vita); Atooi (Switch)
- Designers: Jools Watsham; Matthew Gambrell
- Programmer: Matthew Gambrell
- Artist: Jools Watsham
- Composers: Roth Sothy; Matthew Gambrell; Brian Altano
- Platforms: Microsoft Windows; Nintendo 3DS; PlayStation 4; PlayStation Vita; Wii U; Nintendo Switch
- Release: Nintendo 3DS: NA: December 11, 2014; PAL: June 18, 2015; Microsoft Windows: WW: December 11, 2014; Wii U: NA: July 30, 2015; PlayStation 4, PlayStation Vita: NA: September 1, 2015; PAL: September 1, 2015; Nintendo Switch: WW: February 15, 2018
- Genre: Metroidvania
- Mode: Single-player

Xeodrifter is a 2014 Metroidvania video game developed and published by Renegade Kid for the Nintendo 3DS and Microsoft Windows. A Wii U port of the game was released 2015, and after Gambitious Digital Entertainment acquired the rights to the Microsoft Windows version of the game, it was also released on PlayStation 4 and PlayStation Vita in 2015. A Nintendo Switch version was released in February 2018 after Watsham's company Atooi acquired the rights to the game after Renegade Kid's dissolution.

== Gameplay ==
Xeodrifter is a Metroidvania video game, where the player controls an astronaut whose spaceship is damaged by an asteroid, and must visit four nearby planets in order to repair it. The game allows the player to explore the planets, each representing a different environment. The planets can be visited in any order, but exploration depends on power-ups to gain access to new areas. The game draws inspiration from the Metroid series, and borrows elements from another Renegade Kid game, Mutant Mudds.

== Reception ==
Reception

Aggregate score
Aggregator	Score
Metacritic	(3DS) 73/100

Xeodrifter has been generally well received upon release, with critics praising its gameplay and mechanics, but criticizing its repetitive bosses and short length. The Nintendo 3DS version of the game holds an aggregated Metacritic score of 73/100 based on 17 critic reviews.
