= Diluvion =

2017 submarine exploration video game

- Developer: Arachnid Games
- Publisher: Gambitious Digital Entertainment
- Composer: Light Return
- Platforms: Windows; macOS
- Release: February 2, 2017
- Genres: Action-adventure, role-playing
- Mode: Single-player

Diluvion is a 2017 action-adventure game with role-playing elements developed by American studio Arachnid Games and published by Gambitious Digital Entertainment, later known as Good Shepherd Entertainment. Set after a global flood has forced the remnants of humanity beneath a layer of impenetrable ice, the game places the player in command of a submarine exploring a large underwater world. Its gameplay combines exploration and submarine combat with crew, resource and vessel management.

The game was originally conceived as an episodic project before being expanded into a complete release following a successful crowdfunding campaign. Its setting and visual direction drew upon the works of Jules Verne, while its developers also cited space-combat games such as Freelancer and Wing Commander as influences. Diluvion was released for Windows and macOS on February 2, 2017. Following criticism of its interface, controls, checkpoint system and other mechanics, Arachnid spent approximately another year and a half extensively revising the game. The resulting free update, Diluvion: Resubmerged, was released in September 2018 and subsequently became the version distributed under the game's title.

Diluvion received mixed reviews. Critics generally praised its underwater setting, atmosphere, combination of three-dimensional exploration with hand-painted two-dimensional interiors, and soundtrack, but frequently criticized its interface, navigation, combat and lack of polish.

== Gameplay ==
Diluvion is primarily played from a third-person perspective as the player pilots a submarine through a three-dimensional underwater environment. The world is set centuries after a great flood submerged civilization and the surface became inaccessible beneath a thick layer of ice. Human settlements have subsequently developed around underwater structures, glaciers and rock formations. The player's principal objective is to descend through increasingly dangerous regions in search of an ancient artifact believed to offer humanity a means of escaping its submerged existence.

Exploration is conducted in three dimensions, while entering settlements or viewing the submarine's interior changes the presentation to a hand-painted two-dimensional cross-section. The player can acquire and upgrade multiple submarines, each differing in attributes and weapon capabilities. Progression to deeper areas requires improving a vessel sufficiently to withstand increased water pressure.

Submarines are staffed by crew members who can be recruited while exploring. Individual crew members have different attributes and can be assigned to stations responsible for functions such as propulsion, weapons and repairs. During combat, the player can activate a slow-motion feature to reorganize crew assignments. Crew members also consume food, while the submarine requires oxygen and other supplies. Scrap serves both as a resource and as ammunition for the vessel's guns, creating a tradeoff between exploration and combat.

The player navigates with a compass and sonar rather than a conventional position marker. Sonar reveals landmarks and objects but can also alert nearby hostile vessels. Combat involves maneuvering around hostile submarines and using cannons and torpedoes, while larger sea creatures and other underwater hazards also appear.

Away from combat, the player salvages shipwrecks, trades recovered materials and completes quests. A home base can be developed to house unused submarines and crew members, while upgraded vessels permit access to previously inaccessible depths. Exploration is divided between several large underwater regions containing settlements, wrecks, ruins and other landmarks.

== Development and release ==
Arachnid Games first announced Diluvion in July 2014. The project was originally planned as an episodic game but was subsequently redesigned as a complete release. A crowdfunding campaign held in 2015 raised US$50,554, after which the studio partnered with Gambitious Digital Entertainment to publish the game.

The developers described Diluvion as being inspired by the writing of Jules Verne, particularly the imagery associated with Twenty Thousand Leagues Under the Seas. Arachnid also cited the space-combat games Freelancer and Wing Commander as mechanical influences, translating the freedom of movement and vehicle combat of those games into an underwater environment.

At PAX West in 2016, PC Gamer played a prerelease version and interviewed Arachnid technical director Jacob Stove Lorentzen. The publication compared its crew system to a mixture of FTL: Faster Than Light and Dragon Age, noting that the game combined free three-dimensional exploration with a cross-sectional view in which crew members could be reassigned between stations. The game was initially expected in late 2016 but was delayed. In January 2017, Gambitious announced a February 2 release date.

Diluvion was released for Windows and macOS on February 2, 2017, through Steam, GOG.com and other digital stores. A special edition included a digital art book, soundtrack and additional submarine. The soundtrack was composed by Light Return.

Gambitious was renamed Good Shepherd Entertainment in August 2017, and the latter subsequently became the game's publisher of record. In October 2017, Arachnid Games announced that a Nintendo Switch version of Diluvion was in development, although no release date was announced.

=== Resubmerged ===
Following the original release, Arachnid continued to revise the game in response to player feedback and criticism. Development of a major overhaul continued for approximately another year and a half.

The revised version was released as the free Diluvion: Resubmerged update on September 28, 2018. It substantially reworked the salvaging system, loot, crew management and submarine upgrades, while adding additional ship customization and side quests. The update also revised enemy artificial intelligence, the interface, quest tracking, landmarks and navigation and added the ability to save at almost any time.

GameStar described Resubmerged as an attempt to give the game a second chance after the original version had been affected by bugs and problems with its controls and interface, noting that nearly every major system had been reworked. Resubmerged subsequently became the version sold digitally under the title Diluvion: Resubmerged.

== Reception ==
Reception

Aggregate score
Aggregator	Score
Metacritic	66/100

Review scores
Publication	Score
Destructoid	6.5/10
GameSpot	5/10
PC Games (DE)	72/100
Canard PC	5/10
Vandal	6.5/10
JeuxActu	13/20

According to review aggregator Metacritic, Diluvion received "mixed or average" reviews, with an aggregate score of 66 out of 100 based on 34 critics.

The game's setting and atmosphere were among its most consistently praised elements. Holly Nielsen of PC Gamer highlighted the contrast between the three-dimensional ocean and hand-painted two-dimensional interiors, as well as the uncertainty created by distant structures gradually emerging from the darkness. Destructoid praised the lighting, environmental silhouettes and gradual revelation of large wrecks and structures, while noting the effectiveness of the game's audiovisual presentation during combat. Ramón Varela of Vandal and JeuxActu likewise responded positively to the underwater setting, exploration and visual presentation.

Criticism focused more heavily on the game's mechanical execution. PC Gamer found the interface and controls cumbersome and criticized the checkpoint system, despite finding that its resource and crew-management mechanics could create tension. Destructoid criticized the camera and controls, particularly in confined encounters, as well as bugs and broken quest triggers. Justin Clark of GameSpot similarly praised the premise and setting but argued that awkward controls, unclear systems and a lack of polish undermined the underlying ideas. Varela found the management systems simplistic and submarine handling troublesome during combat, while JeuxActu criticized the menus, navigation and presentation of the narrative. Across these reviews, critics generally regarded Diluvion's world and atmosphere as more accomplished than its interface, combat and supporting systems.
