= Good Shepherd Entertainment =

Dutch video game publisher

- Logo in use since 2017
- Formerly: Gambitious Digital Entertainment (2011–2017)
- Industry: Video games
- Founded: 2011; 15 years ago
- Founders: Paul Hanraets; Sjoerd Geurts; Harry Miller; Andy Payne; Mike Wilson
- Headquarters: The Hague, Netherlands
- Number of locations: 2 offices (2012)
- Area served: Worldwide
- Key people: Brian Grigsby; (CEO and CFO); Paul Hanraets; (director, corporate development)
- Number of employees: 23 (2022)
- Parent: Devolver Digital (2021–present)
- Subsidiaries: Artificer
- Website: goodshepherd.games

Good Shepherd Entertainment (formerly Gambitious Digital Entertainment) is a Dutch video game publisher based in Amsterdam. The company was founded in 2011 and opened its equity crowdfunding platform in September 2012. Gambitious' publishing label was opened in 2014, offering publishing services. In August 2017, Gambitious Digital Entertainment was rebranded Good Shepherd Entertainment whereas it ceased its crowdfunding activities and fully transitioned into being a publisher. Having been a consultant to the company prior, Brian Grigsby now became the CEO of the company.

== History ==
=== Founding (2011–2012) ===
Former Gambitious Digital Entertainment logo, used 2015–2017

Gambitious Digital Entertainment was established in 2011 by chief executive officer Paul Hanraets. Founding partners include Mike Wilson and Harry Miller of Devolver Digital, Sjoerd Geurts, and Andy Payne. Additional funding was provided by business funding platform Symbid. The company and its crowdfunding platform, also called Gambitious, were formally announced in February 2012. By June 2012, the company was headquartered in Amsterdam, Netherlands, with another office in Austin, Texas, United States. The shareholdings of Miller and Wilson, while independent from Devolver Digital, made for a controlling interest.

=== Crowdfunding (2012–2017) ===
Gambitious' crowdfunding platform was opened on 25 September 2012. The platform was described as a hybrid crowd-finance platform and indie publishing label. The first product featured on Gambitious' platform was to be a sequel to Mushroom Men. The first game featured became Train Fever instead.

According to Wilson, the idea behind the company was to create "a platform that brings investors and developers together to create great games to their mutual benefit". In March 2013, Gambitious successfully closed their first equity-based crowdfunding campaign for Train Fever, which raised €250,000 from 640 international investors.

Gambitious also experimented by offering pledging as a funding option on their platform. This resulted in a successful funding for charity SpecialEffect, which raised 113% of it target aimed towards purchasing specialised computers for severely disabled gamers that can be controlled using eye movement.

Due to international regulatory differences on the topic of equity-based crowdfunding, Gambitious was forced to restructure their model several times, leading to the eventual decision to officially separate from Symbid in February 2015 and transition into an independent game publisher. Between 2015 and 2017 Gambitious utilises an evolving set of crowd finance tools and techniques in order to fund their games. Whereby they rely on a private network of investors who invest alongside them under the same exact terms and conditions. In January 2016, Gambitious opened their network to new United States accredited and European investors. On 16 August 2017, Gambitious was rebranded as Good Shepherd Entertainment and transitioned from a crowdfunding platform to a publisher collaborating with a private network of accredited investors upon request. The company also received a new investment by Advance/Newhouse, through which they opened new full-time positions. At this time, the company had 12 employees.

=== Indie game publishing (2017–present) ===
Every game that Gambitious has signed on has been funded and released, with four of the first six titles delivering profits to investors in the first month following release. Gambitious had a core group of 30 investors.

In 2019, Good Shepherd Entertainment partnered with Lionsgate Games and announced John Wick Hex. Paul Hanraets stated that Good Shepherd intends to focus on triple-I games and similar licence-holder collaborations. According to Hanraets, the company has access to popular pop-culture IPs like John Wick, which it will pair with experienced indie developers.

In April 2019, Good Shepherd Entertainment acquired a majority stake in Artificer, a Warsaw based game development studio founded by the core team responsible for Hard West and Phantom Doctrine. Artificer consists of over 30 team-members who have previously worked on numerous titles including the Call of Juarez and the Dead Island series.

Devolver Digital bought Good Shepherd on 7 January 2021. On January 31, 2024, 25 employees were laid off from Artificer with another 10-12 workers expected to be let go in the next few months.

== Games ==
=== Games published ===
Year of release	Title	Developer(s)	Platform(s)
2014	Train Fever	Urban Games	Linux, macOS, Microsoft Windows
2015	Magnetic: Cage Closed	Guru Games	Microsoft Windows, Xbox One
2015	Breach & Clear: Deadline	Mighty Rabbit Studios; Gun Media	Linux, macOS, Microsoft Windows
2015	Xeodrifter	Renegade Kid	Nintendo Switch, PlayStation 4, PlayStation Vita
2015	Pathologic Classic HD	Ice-Pick Lodge	Microsoft Windows
2015	Hard West	CreativeForge Games	Linux, macOS, Microsoft Windows
2015	Oh...Sir!	Vile Monarch	iOS, Linux, macOS, Microsoft Windows
2016	Hard Reset Redux	Flying Wild Hog	Microsoft Windows, PlayStation 4, Xbox One
2016	Crush Your Enemies	Vile Monarch	Android, iOS, Linux, macOS, Microsoft Windows
2016	Zombie Night Terror	NoClip	Linux, macOS, Microsoft Windows
2016	RunGunJumpGun	ThirtyThree	macOS, Microsoft Windows, Nintendo Switch
2016	Oh...Sir!! The Insult Simulator	Vile Monarch	Android, iOS, Linux, macOS, Microsoft Windows, Nintendo Switch
2016	Transport Fever	Urban Games	Linux, macOS, Microsoft Windows
2017	Diluvion	Arachnid Games	macOS, Microsoft Windows
2017	Oh...Sir! The Hollywood Roast	Vile Monarch	Android, iOS, Linux, macOS, Microsoft Windows, Nintendo Switch
2017	Redeemer	Sobaka Studio	Microsoft Windows
2018	Where the Water Tastes Like Wine	Dim Bulb Games	Linux, macOS, Microsoft Windows
2018	MachiaVillain	WildFactor	Linux, macOS, Microsoft Windows
2018	Milanoir	Italo Games	Microsoft Windows, Nintendo Switch, PlayStation 4, Xbox One
2018	Semblance	Nyamakop	macOS, Microsoft Windows, Nintendo Switch
2018	Phantom Doctrine	CreativeForge Games	Microsoft Windows, PlayStation 4, Xbox One
2019	John Wick Hex	Bithell Games	macOS, Microsoft Windows, PlayStation 4, Nintendo Switch, Xbox One
2019	Black Future '88	Super Scary Snakes	macOS, Microsoft Windows
2019	Transport Fever 2	Urban Games	Linux, Microsoft Windows
2020	Monster Train	Shiny Shoe	Microsoft Windows, Xbox One, Nintendo Switch, iOS, PlayStation 5
2020	OlliOlli: Switch Stance	Roll7	Nintendo Switch
2021	The Eternal Cylinder	ACE Team	Microsoft Windows, PlayStation 4, Xbox One, PlayStation 5, Xbox Series X/S
2022	Hard West 2	Ice Code Games	Microsoft Windows
2023	Showgunners	Artificer	Microsoft Windows
2023	Hellboy Web of Wyrd	Upstream Arcade	Microsoft Windows, Nintendo Switch, PlayStation 4, PlayStation 5, Xbox One, Xbox Series X/S
2024	Dicefolk	LEAP Game Studios, Tiny Ghoul	Microsoft Windows, Nintendo Switch
2024	Demon's Mirror	Be-Rad Entertainment	Microsoft Windows
2025	Moroi	Violet Saint	Microsoft Windows

=== Games re-released ===
Year of re-release	Year of original release	Title	Developer(s)	Platform(s)
2015	2014	Breach & Clear	Mighty Rabbit Studios	Linux, macOS, Microsoft Windows
2015	2013	Mutant Mudds Deluxe	Renegade Kid	Microsoft Windows
2015	2014	Xeodrifter	Renegade Kid	Microsoft Windows
2015	2011	Hard Reset	Flying Wild Hog	Microsoft Windows
