= Dementium II =

2010 video game

- North American box art
- Developers: Renegade Kid; Memetic Games (HD)
- Publishers: SouthPeak Games; Digital Tribe Games (HD)
- Director: Jools Watsham
- Producer: Jools Watsham
- Platforms: Nintendo DS; Microsoft Windows; Mac OS X
- Release: Nintendo DS: NA: May 4, 2010; EU: June 25, 2010; Windows, Mac OS X: WW: December 17, 2013
- Genres: Survival horror, first-person shooter
- Mode: Single-player

Dementium II is a 2010 survival horror first-person shooter video game developed by Renegade Kid and published by SouthPeak Games for the Nintendo DS. It is the sequel to 2007's Dementium: The Ward. The game received generally favorable reviews. A remastered version of the game without involvement from Renegade Kid was released for Microsoft Windows and Mac OS X on December 17, 2013, to negative reviews.

== Gameplay ==
Dementium II features many improvements over its predecessor, including different weapons, a larger variety of enemies, the ability to jump and crouch, save points, more environments, the ability to hold the flashlight and gun at the same time, an improved map system and the removal of respawning enemies. In addition, health items are now saved in the inventory and players can use them at any given time.

== Plot ==
Dementium II opens with the protagonist of Dementium: The Ward, William Redmoor, awakening in a hospital bed. He is escorted through the facility to a cell in which he finds a postcard from himself, which urges him to flee the hospital. Suddenly, the world around William changes into a demented version of its usual appearance, and he is forced to fight his way through this altered reality.

As William progresses reality shifts from normal to demented semi-frequently, and occasionally more postcards from himself show up, giving him direction and advice. Inside the hospital, he confronts the chief doctor, who informs William that the demented reality began manifesting only after surgery was done on William's brain, implicating that something was 'let out' of William's head. The doctor then shifts into a more macabre version of himself as reality shifts again, and unleashes an enemy on William. Afterwards, William continues looking for a way out of the hospital, eventually stumbling upon his intake form, which claims he murdered his wife, and is suffering from a "schizotypal disorder" or some unknown mental illness. William manages to escape the hospital through a tunnel dug in the boiler room.

William makes his way to a deserted village nearby, all while fighting monsters that have infested the countryside. He stumbles across various notes, allegedly from his wife, that lead him from place to place in an effort to meet up with her. She urges him to find their daughter and leads him to his daughter's grave, from which he digs up a doll and brings to a church where his wife is supposed to be waiting and she is revealed to have been a wendigo disguised as his wife. After defeating the wendigo he finds a postcard telling him to return to the hospital to stop the doctor.

Upon returning to the hospital the doctor speaks to William through the intercom, lamenting William's lack of cooperation. In the hospital, William finds a page from a book that speaks of Malatesta, an ancient serpent trapped within the Plane of Anguish. According to the page, Malatesta will infect a host and try to break free from the Plane of Anguish using that host. If the serpent breaks free, it becomes invincible. William makes his way to a portal to the Plane of Anguish, while being taunted by the doctor, who is implied to be Malatesta's host. William enters the Plane, and defeats the Serpent.

After the fight, William awakens in a normal room, but upon trying to leave, he sees the doctor instead of his own reflection in a mirror. When he moves in closer to investigate the doctor reaches out and pulls him in and the game ends.

== Development ==
The game was announced when a teaser trailer was released on May 30, 2009, to IGN. It acted as a commercial for the Bright Dawn Treatment Center. This was one of the many settings for the game.

Watsham had said in October 2009 that Dementium II is "the best game he has ever worked on."

== Reception ==
Reception

Aggregate score
Aggregator	Score	
Aggregator	DS	PC
Metacritic	75/100	37/100

Review scores
Publication	Score	
Publication	DS	PC
Destructoid	7.5/10	N/A
Eurogamer	7/10	N/A
Famitsu	30/40	N/A
GamePro	3.5/5	N/A
GameSpot	8/10	5/10
GameZone	4/10	N/A
IGN	8/10	N/A
Nintendo Life	7/10	N/A
Nintendo Power	8/10	N/A
Nintendo World Report	8.5/10	N/A
The A.V. Club	C	N/A
Slant Magazine	3/5	0.5/5

The DS version received "generally favorable reviews", while the PC version received "generally unfavorable reviews", according to the review aggregation website Metacritic. In Japan, where the DS version was ported and published by Intergrow on September 30, 2010, Famitsu gave it a score of one eight, two sevens, and one eight for a total of 30 out of 40.
