= CreativeForge Games =

Polish video game developer and publisher

CreativeForge Games S.A.
- Type: Public
- Traded as: NewConnect: CFG
- ISIN: PLCRFRG00016
- Industry: Video games
- Founded: 21 November 2011; 14 years ago
- Founders: Jakub Rozenek; Łukasz Żarnowiecki
- Headquarters: Warsaw, Poland
- Key people: Piotr Karbowski (CEO)
- Products: Hard West; Phantom Doctrine
- Owner: PlayWay (47.81%)
- Number of employees: ≈11 (2019)
- Website: creativeforge.pl

CreativeForge Games S.A. is a Polish video game developer and publisher based in Warsaw. Founded in 2011 by Jakub Rozenek and Łukasz Żarnowiecki, the company developed Ancient Space, Hard West, and Phantom Doctrine, with Hard West 2 and Aircraft Carrier Survival in development. CreativeForge is listed on the NewConnect stock exchange with 47.81% owned by PlayWay.

== History ==
CreativeForge Games was founded in Warsaw on 21 November 2011 by Jakub Rozenek and Łukasz Żarnowiecki under an investment agreement with the publisher PlayWay. The studio's debut game was Ancient Space, a real-time strategy game published by Paradox Interactive in September 2014. PlayWay bought out Rozenek's shares in CreativeForge in December 2014. A second game, the Western-themed turn-based tactics game Hard West, was crowdfunded through the website Kickstarter; the campaign ended in September 2014 with CA$94,000 out of CA$70,000 raised. The game was released by Gambitious Digital Entertainment in November 2015.

CreativeForge continued working with Gambitious (later renamed Good Shepherd Entertainment) on its Phantom Doctrine, a turn-based tactics game set in an alternate history 1983 Cold War setting that was released in August 2018. Within three months, the game had sold 100,000 copies. However, the game was met with a poor critical reception and had a low sales performance, as a result of which Żarnowiecki resigned as chief executive officer (CEO) of the company and was interim-replaced by former lead designer Kacper Szymczak in October 2018. Szymczak subsequently resigned himself and left the company in January 2019 because he felt as though the role of CEO was more of a puppet for the company's shareholders. Additionally, 29 of CreativeForge's previously 40 staff left the company. In light of the announcement of these resignations, CreativeForge's share value on the NewConnect stock exchange fell by roughly 12%. At the time, PlayWay owned 47.81% of these shares. Piotr Karbowski assumed the role of CEO in February. Some former CreativeForge employees established the studio Artificer, which was majority-acquired by Good Shepherd in April 2019.

In February 2019, it was announced that CreativeForge was involved in the development of two games: Hard West 2, which was being developed by an external team (with CreativeForge issuing the licence and publishing the game in exchange for 50% of its sales revenue), and Aircraft Carrier Survival, which was being developed internally (having finished pre-production). In March 2022, publisher Good Shepherd Entertainment announced the upcoming release of Hard West 2 with the involvement of Polish indie game development studio Ice Code Games.

== Games ==
=== As developer ===
Year	Title	Platform(s)	Publisher(s)
2014	Ancient Space	macOS, Microsoft Windows	Paradox Interactive
2015	Hard West	Linux, macOS, Microsoft Windows, Nintendo Switch	Gambitious Digital Entertainment
2018	Phantom Doctrine	Microsoft Windows, Nintendo Switch, PlayStation 4, Xbox One	Good Shepherd Entertainment
2022	Postal: Brain Damaged	Microsoft Windows	Running with Scissors

=== As publisher ===
Year	Title	Platform(s)	Developer(s)
2022	Aircraft Carrier Survival	Microsoft Windows, Nintendo Switch	Gambit Games Studio
TBA	House Flipper City	TBA	Rembrosoft
