= Runbow =

2015 video game

- Developer: 13AM Games
- Publisher: 13AM Games (Note: 3DS physical version published by Nighthawk Interactive. Digital and physical versions for Nintendo Switch and PlayStation 4 were published by Headup Games and Merge Games, respectively.)
- Director: Alex Rushdy
- Producer: Dave Proctor
- Designers: Thomas McCall; Justin Fernandes
- Programmers: Marty Kugler; Unai Cabezón; Michael Nicoletti; Elsio Perazzini
- Artists: Takashi; Aaron Kwapisinski; Shawn Fraser
- Composers: Dan Rodrigues; Dave Proctor
- Engine: Unity
- Platforms: Wii U; Windows; New Nintendo 3DS; Switch; Xbox One; PlayStation 4
- Release: 27 August 2015: Wii U; NA: 27 August 2015; EU: 3 September 2015; AU: 23 October 2015 Windows; WW: 18 November 2016 New Nintendo 3DS; NA/EU: 20 June 2017 Xbox One; WW: 16 July 2017 Nintendo Switch, PS4; WW: 3 July 2018
- Genres: Platform, racing
- Modes: Single-player, multiplayer

Runbow is a platform racing video game made for the Wii U and later ported to Microsoft Windows, New Nintendo 3DS, Xbox One, PlayStation 4, and Nintendo Switch. Runbow was developed by Canadian independent video game developer 13AM Games as their debut title, releasing it on 27 August 2015 in North America, 3 September 2015 in Europe, and 23 October 2015 in Australasia. The game was released in Japan on 25 November 2015.

== Gameplay ==
Gameplay screenshot

Runbow is a multiplayer-focused platformer in which players aim to be the first to reach a trophy at the end of each level. Players can perform a double jump as well as perform attacks to defeat enemies or gain extra reach whilst jumping. The background of each level constantly shifts between a cycle of colors, causing platforms and obstacles of the same color as the background, such as blockades and spikes, to disappear. By using the Wii Remote's connectivity to utitlise the Wii Nunchuk or Wii Classic Controllers in addition to itself, the game is capable of supporting up to nine players. The game supports features such as achievements, time trials, a special mode called "Master the Bowhemoth", and many more. There is character customization, as well as other modes that are not racing-focused, such as "King of the Hill" and "Arena".

== Development ==
The concept of the game was created in the 2014 Global Game Jam. The game was announced on 24 October 2014. 13AM Games confirmed that the game "is sorta like Mario Kart". The game was shown at the 2015 Game Developer's Conference, revealing the names of the game's characters, Hue and Val.

On 13 April 2015, 13AM Games revealed several independent game characters that would guest-star in the Runbow roster: Shovel Knight from the eponymous Shovel Knight, Rusty from SteamWorld Dig, Juan and Tostada from Guacamelee!, Swift Thornebrooke from Sportsball, Scram Kitty from Scram Kitty and His Buddy on Rails, along with CommanderVideo and CommandgirlVideo from the Bit.Trip series. More characters were announced on 11 August 2015: Gunvolt from Azure Striker Gunvolt, Teslamancer from Teslagrad, a Clone from Stealth Inc., A.R.I.D. from The Fall, the Xeodrifter from the eponymous Xeodrifter, the Princess from Chariot, Max from Mutant Mudds, the Drifter from Hyper Light Drifter, and Unity Japan's mascot Unity-chan. From 15 June 2015 to 23 June 2015, a beta preview of Runbow was released on the Nintendo eShop along with 8 other "Nindie" titles.

On 11 April 2016, 13AM Games revealed via Nintendo Life additional downloadable content released on 14 April, which includes themed packs that come with costumes and music, a complimentary addition of guest playable character Lilac from Freedom Planet, and a 48-level story expansion called Satura's Space Adventure.

During E3 2016, 13AM Games revealed a trailer announcing a port of the game to the New Nintendo 3DS, titled Runbow Pocket, which compiles the main story, as well as all existing DLC, into a portable game. This marks the second full title exclusive to the New Nintendo 3DS, the first being Xenoblade Chronicles 3D. Runbow Pocket was planned to be released in Fall 2016. However, in October 2016, 13AM Games revealed that, in addition of a release date for the retail version of Runbow, Runbow Pocket was delayed to the first quarter of 2017 because the company ran into some issues along development. As part of the final DLC pack for Runbow, 13AM Games revealed that another playable character was coming to Runbow. Shantae was released on 25 October 2016 along with the final update for the game. Along with the release of the update, the company was initially going to release the physical version of the game on the same day as the update, but the physical version was instead released on 1 November 2016. However, along with more bugs provided in the game, the developers wanted more time to work on the game, and the game's release date was pushed back to 20 June 2017.

== Reception ==
Reception

Aggregate score
Aggregator	Score			
Aggregator	3DS	NS	PS4	Wii U
Metacritic	66/100	79/100	71/100	82/100

Review scores
Publication	Score			
Publication	3DS	NS	PS4	Wii U
Destructoid	N/A	N/A	N/A	9/10
GameRevolution	N/A	N/A	N/A	3/5
Hardcore Gamer	N/A	N/A	N/A	3/5
Nintendo Life	7/10	8/10	N/A	9/10
Nintendo World Report	7/10	8/10	N/A	9/10
PlayStation Official Magazine – UK	N/A	N/A	7/10	N/A
Shacknews	N/A	9/10	N/A	9/10

Runbow received mostly positive reviews. It has a score of 82 on Metacritic, indicating "generally favorable reviews", based on 34 critics.
