= Moon (2009 video game) =

2009 video game

- Developer: Renegade Kid
- Publishers: NA: Mastiff; EU: Gamebridge
- Director: Jools Watsham
- Producer: Jools Watsham
- Artist: Gregg Hargrove
- Engine: Renegade Engine
- Platform: Nintendo DS
- Release: NA: January 13, 2009; EU: June 3, 2009
- Genre: First-person shooter
- Mode: Single-player

Moon is a 2009 first-person shooter video game developed by Renegade Kid for the Nintendo DS. It was originally released in North America on January 13, 2009 by Mastiff and in Europe on June 3, 2009 by Gamebridge. An episodic remake and expansion titled Moon Chronicles was released by Renegade Kid for the Nintendo 3DS in 2014.

== Gameplay ==
Gameplay and controls in Moon

Moon features first-person shooter gameplay and full 3D environments that the player can explore. Over the course of the game, the player can collect a variety of weapons to fight enemies. The game has three difficulty modes and is presented in multiple episodes with checkpoints scattered throughout each one. The upper screen of the DS displays the player's view of the environment, while the lower screen displays menu commands and a real-time map. The game's story will be revealed as the player progresses through each level with pre-rendered cutscenes, text logs accessible through computer terminals, and communications with the player character's superiors. Much of the fighting the player experiences takes place in narrow corridors, although the developer has mentioned that the updated game engine allows for wide-open environments and large groups of enemies. The game does not feature any multiplayer mode, with the focus of the game being the single-player campaign.

While the gameplay is mostly action-oriented, several puzzles are included to challenge the player. Some of these puzzles involve the player taking control of a small robotic drone to travel through vents and tunnels to unlock doors. The drone is armed with a stun gun that can temporarily incapacitate enemies, as well as deactivate shields that block the player's progress throughout the game.

During gameplay, the player can accumulate a maximum of seven different weapons, not including the drone. Weapons can be selected using the touch screen, and gameplay is automatically paused during weapon selection. Aiming is also accomplished on the touch screen, with movement assigned to the D-pad or buttons, depending on the player's settings.

== Plot ==
In Moon, the year is 2058 and the United States has established a series of stations on the Moon to perform scientific experiments and construct a Mars launch facility. An extraordinary discovery has been uncovered at one of the dig sites, a sealed hatch leading beneath the Moon's surface. The player assumes the role of Major Kane, the leader of a special task force sent to investigate the mysterious hatch and reveal its secrets.

The player controls Major Kane, who is en route to a Moon base, where several mysterious hatches are uncovered. Upon Arrival, Kane has a brief conference with General Lambert. Alpha Team's helmet feed is seen on the secondary Monitors, when a burst of energy knocks out communications, and kills the members of Alpha team. En route to the hatch, Kane comes across a mysterious canister filled with a blue liquid, which he unknowingly inhales, and loses consciousness. Hours later, Kane awakens to find his vitals the same as a world class athlete. Kane proceeds to the hatch, and finds crates of canisters identical to the one he found, earlier. After Kane destroys the boss, the core is set to self-destruct. Kane escapes in the nick of time, only to find the Moon base overrun with sentries. Kane then secures the garage, and heads to the next hatch, via a Moon rover, referred to as the Lola-RR10. in this next hatch, he finds the shocking truth about the canisters: they contain human organ extracts. Disgusted, he leaves, only to be abducted by a spaceship. Kane then must fight his way off, destroying the ship in the process. A mysterious frequency is found, apparently friendly, helps Kane navigate through the maze of a lab. Kane then gets access to a shuttle, which takes him to an urbanized Saturn. Kane then fights his way to the supreme commander, which levels the aliens' civilization. The game ends with Kane warping back to Earth, followed by three enemy spaceships.

== Development ==
Since Moon utilizes an updated version of the Renegade Engine included in Renegade Kid's previous game, Dementium: The Ward, the game features a frame rate of 60 frames per second and high-quality 3D visuals, along with stylus-based controls. Renegade Kid has focused on "high-action gameplay challenges" to test the player's skills; these challenges include varying the placement of enemies in the game and providing them with unexpected behaviors. The exploration aspects of the game were designed to "reward" a player with access to new areas among other things.

A jump mechanic was considered for the game, but was ultimately never implemented in order to focus on shooting gameplay. According to the developer, this "would have divided our gameplay focus in order to present the player with interesting ways of utilizing the jump so it didn't feel like an afterthought and may have diluted the overall experience. Focusing on one thing and trying to make it good is usually the best thing to do rather than do many things only to an OK quality."

In January 2014, Mastiff sold Renegade Kid complete ownership of the title, including publishing rights, leading to the development of its sequel.

== Reception ==
Reception

Aggregate score
Aggregator	Score
Metacritic	71/100

Review scores
Publication	Score
Destructoid	7/10
Eurogamer	6/10
GamePro	2/5
GameRevolution	B
GameSpot	7/10
GameZone	7.3/10
IGN	8.5/10
Nintendo Power	7.5/10
Nintendo World Report	8/10
VideoGamer.com	6/10
The A.V. Club	A−
Teletext GameCentral	4/10

Moon received "average" reviews according to the review aggregation website Metacritic. Nintendo Life praised the game's graphics, frame rate and detail of the level design but said the game lacked variety. Another review voiced disappointment at the lack of multiplayer.

== Remake ==
Moon Chronicles
- Developer: Renegade Kid
- Publisher: Renegade Kid
- Platform: Nintendo 3DS
- Release: Season 1 Episode 1: NA: May 15, 2014; Episode 2-4: NA: February 5, 2015
- Genre: First-person shooter
- Mode: Single-player

On January 24, 2014, Renegade Kid unveiled Moon Chronicles for the Nintendo 3DS. It was an episodic remake of Moon, set to expand the story even further. The base game was released as Moon Chronicles: Episode 1: One Small Step for $8.99 on the Nintendo eShop on May 15, 2014 in North America only. Episode 2, Episode 3, and Episode 4 have been released as DLC for $4.50 each on the eShop, or $9.00 for all three. Episode 1, 2, 3, and 4 make up the first Season of Moon Chronicles episodes. They also make up the actual remade content from the original Moon. The game was never released in Europe.
