= Redeemer (video game) =

2017 video game

- Developer: Sobaka Studio
- Publishers: Good Shepherd Entertainment; Buka Entertainment; Ravenscourt
- Designer: Stepan Shabanov
- Programmers: Dmitry Kachkov, Artem Khakhin
- Artists: Mikhail Bushuev, Yuri Savelyev
- Composer: Nadezhda Gourskaya
- Engine: Unreal Engine
- Platforms: Microsoft Windows; PlayStation 4; Xbox One; Nintendo Switch
- Release: 1 August 2017; 19 July 2019 (Enhanced Edition)
- Genres: Beat 'em up, top-down shooter, hack and slash
- Modes: Single-player, multiplayer

Redeemer is a top-down shooter beat 'em up video game developed by Russian company Sobaka Studio and published by Good Shepherd Entertainment. The game was released for Microsoft Windows on August 1, 2017. An Enhanced Edition was released for PlayStation 4, Nintendo Switch and Xbox One on July 19, 2019. It was released in Japan on March 5, 2020.

== Plot ==
Redeemer is a beat em up shooter game, where the player controls a former elite operative Vasily, who is living in a mountain monastery together with other brothers-monks. One day, an evil corporation discovers Vasily's location and tries to get rid of him using local bandits. Almost all the monks in the monastery are killed as a result, including Vasily's old mentor and best friend. Vasily wants to destroy the evil corporation.

== Gameplay ==
Redeemer's gameplay includes a combination of exploration, stealth, and combat. Players move through each location eliminating waves of enemies that stand in the way using any means available. Power-ups and weapon upgrades are dispersed throughout levels. The game features three main types of weaponry (cudgels, sledgehammers and knives). The player can use the environment — special interactive objects in a level, as a weapon, for example chairs, refrigerators, or tables. Vasily can also throw enemies, or grapple attack them, and is able to perform a pounce maneuver on a nearby enemy. When encountering an enemy Vasily can attack or perform a one-button quick kill.

== Development and release ==
Redeemer was developed by Russian indie game company Sobaka Studio and published by Good Shepherd Entertainment. The game was released for Windows on 1 August 2017 via Steam.

=== Enhanced Edition ===
On 17 July 2017, Sobaka Studio and Buka Entertainment announced an "Enhanced Edition" of Redeemer. It was released on Xbox One, PlayStation 4, Nintendo Switch and Microsoft Windows on July 19, 2019. All existing owners of Redeemer will receive free upgrades to the Enhanced Edition via Steam. Redeemer: Enhanced Edition features new content, including local co-op mode for 2 players, improvement of some levels' balance and abilities divided by character classes (Monk and Soldier).

== Reception ==
Redeemer received mixed reviews upon release, with score of 64 for PC version (based on 25 reviews) while user scores were higher with 7.1 for PC version respectively by video game review aggregator Metacritic. Cody Medellin of Worthplaying stated that "For the most part, Redeemer succeeds in delivering an action-packed beat-'em-up experience. Unless players are facing bosses or enemies who are immune to regular attacks, the combat is fast and visceral. The overall game length is good, and although some of the mechanics can be inconsistent, there's enough here to make the experience worthwhile." Justin Clark of GameSpot stated that "Redeemer's a game that clearly has its heart in the right place but feels the need to justify or enhance a genre that needs less to succeed than one might think".
