= Phantom Doctrine =

2018 strategy video game

- Developer: CreativeForge Games
- Publisher: Good Shepherd Entertainment
- Composers: Marcin Przybyłowicz; Jan Sanejko
- Engine: Unreal Engine 4
- Platforms: Windows, Xbox One, PlayStation 4, Nintendo Switch
- Release: Windows, PlayStation 4 August 14, 2018; Xbox One; August 24, 2018; Nintendo Switch; June 6, 2019
- Genre: Strategy
- Modes: Single-player, multiplayer

Phantom Doctrine is a turn-based strategy video game developed by Polish studio CreativeForge Games and published by Good Shepherd Entertainment in 2018. It is inspired by classic spy films and conspiracy theories.

== Plot ==
Set in 1983, Phantom Doctrine takes place in an alternative Cold War where brainwashing is a real danger and secret organizations control the world. The player-character is a former agent of the CIA, KGB or Mossad who learns of a global conspiracy called "The Beholder Initiative".

Beholder is working on "Project Iceberg", a plot to achieve world domination. Project Iceberg will use computers to decrypt and alter government communications in real time, making societal manipulation effortless. The player-character forms a team called "The Cabal" in order to fight Beholder. The Cabal recruits members, pursues leads and foils various Beholder projects, while being hunted by Beholder in turn.

Eventually, the Cabal allies with a Beholder turncoat codenamed "Cardinal", who informs them that Project Iceberg is almost ready to begin. The Cabal discovers Project Iceberg's headquarters in Grenada. Cardinal manipulates US President Reagan into invading the island in order to occupy Beholder's army. The Cabal infiltrates and destroys the Iceberg HQ, killing the leader of Beholder in the process. However, an epilogue reveals that many of Beholder's desires continued to come true (such as the fall of the Soviet Union), raising questions as to whether the organization is actually gone.

The Extended Campaign reveals that Beholder is a splinter group of "the Komplex", a larger conspiracy based around fuelling military–industrial complexes. The Komplex covertly helped the Cabal to destroy Project Iceberg. Additionally, Tai-Pan, a minor villain from earlier in the story, is revealed to have seized control of the Beholder remnants and reconciled them with the Komplex. The final mission, set in 1991, consists of tracking down and killing Tai-Pan. However, the Komplex remains active.

== Gameplay ==
The game is divided between global strategy management elements, intelligence analysis, and tactical missions. There is also an Extended Campaign mode unlocked after beating the game once, with a more complex story and additional missions.

=== Hideout ===
Here the player manages resources, can build and upgrade facilities, hire new agents or assign agents to perform different tasks. Agents can craft items, forge money, undergo training, heal in the infirmary, or analyze obtained intel. Later facilities give options such as monitoring enemy radio communications and brainwashing captured enemy agents.

Danger level is the indicator of how close the Beholder Initiative is to finding the location of the player's hideout, which will eventually end in an enemy raid unless the hideout is relocated. Danger cannot be decreased, only controlled. Various activities can increase its level like abandoning agents in missions, allowing enemy agents to complete their activity, or recruiting double agents.

=== Espionage Network ===
This is the hub showing the world map. Here the player can send agents to scout suspicious activities, seek enemy agents or carry out missions. It also provides direct control of in-game time progression.

=== Investigation Board ===
Here cases, locations, and individuals can be researched to reveal new missions, resources, and technologies. Utilizing a classic pinboard and string approach, players scour the documents for matching codewords while connecting the dots on the corkboard.

=== Missions ===
Handled turn-based, missions have two modes: infiltration and combat mode.

Infiltration mode allows the player to sneak into a location, stealthily complete an objective, and extract whilst undetected. Since most missions start in this mode, it also gives the player a chance to search and explore the map, learn enemy patterns and routines, locate enemy agents, and make strategic planning.

Combat mode is usually triggered by the player, since most missions start as infiltration. Various things like loud gunfire and dead bodies being found will trigger an alarm thus activating the combat mode. At this point, reinforcements start arriving, player agents catch heat, and the enemy openly engages in combat.

=== Combat ===
Phantom Doctrine takes a new approach on turn-based tactics by almost complete removing die rolls for its combat solutions. Every character has awareness, a mechanic that represents the character's composure during a firefight. This resource is both used to perform special abilities and to dodge incoming attacks, and it regenerates every turn by a certain amount.

=== Characters ===
All agents have four stats (circulatory, sensory, respiratory, motoric) that will determine their hit points, awareness, action points, etc. They also have perks, some of them may be hidden until certain missions and challenges are accomplished, and backgrounds that determine their starting weapon proficiencies and abilities. As agents gain experience they level up and gain new perks. Through training, they gain proficiency in various weapons which will increase their weapon efficiency and allow them to install weapon mods.

Player agents may also accrue "heat" if their evacuation is compromised, through combat, or if they're seen on Infiltration missions. Heat decreases over time unless it reaches its max, at which point their ID is exposed. Agents with exposed IDS take longer to travel and may be randomly ambushed. Heat can be reset by forging a new identity for the agent.

=== Length of game-play ===
A single-player campaign takes about 40 hours to complete.

==== Replayability ====
Through randomly generated characters, algorithmically populated and adapted maps, and randomized snippets give a experience that is granted with every playthrough. Playing as a CIA, KGB, or Mossad agent promises making three playthroughs different.

== Reception ==
Reception

Aggregate score
Aggregator	Score
Metacritic	PC: 73/100; PS4: 73/100; XONE: 67/100; NS: 71/100

Review scores
Publication	Score
Game Informer	8/10
GameSpot	9/10
GameStar	69/100
IGN	7.4/10
Jeuxvideo.com	16/20
Nintendo Life	6/10
Nintendo World Report	8/10
PC Gamer (US)	62/100
PCGamesN	7/10
Push Square	7/10
The Guardian	2/5

Mike Epstein from IGN enjoyed feeling "like a genuine spymaster". He considered "weighing the risks and rewards" of the player's actions exciting, however he finds investigating intelligence provided by informants "somewhat less exciting". He both appreciates information-gathering in the game and finds it the game's weakest component. He believes good preparation for the mission gives satisfaction. The IGN reviewer agrees that the game creates "a paranoid, desperate experience which feels pitch-perfect for a spy game."

GameSpot reviewer also praises the feeling of paranoia in the game: "Tension and suspicion are ingrained throughout Phantom Doctrine to great effect. Its isometric turn-based combat system is rewardingly complex, steeped with the feeling of paranoia, where every variable decision and tactic needs to be carefully considered".

The Guardian gave the game two out of five stars, criticizing the game for not teaching the player fundamental aspects of how to play. Jeff Marchiafava from Game Informer agrees that the game is not explained well, however he writes: "the puzzle pieces slowly fell into place the longer I played". He enjoys the missions, but writes that they get repetitive, as safe strategy is also tedious. He also enjoyed managing base and agents, but complained the agents lack personality.

Evan Lahti of PC Gamer agrees that the agents lack identity ("all pick from the same perks and weapon training and can carry any weapon"). He praises the plot, which mixes a fictional conspiracy with Cold War, and thinks that if the events were more frequent or had more permanent effect the agents might "have felt like genuine characters with histories, not collections of stats behind a portrait". He sums up: "It sucks that so many of Phantom Doctrine's good ideas are underdeveloped." and scores the game 62 out of 100.

Jeremy Peel of PCGamesN writes that the developer "has absolutely nailed the atmosphere of Cold War genre fiction". In contrast to the PC Gamer's reviewer, according to whom a certain combination of agents' perks allows to go around unnoticed and feels like having a cheat code, Jeremy Peel is glad the missions can be finished without raising alarms. Also, while the PCGamer's reviewer praises the mini-game with analysing documents and calls it "strangely captivating", the PCGamesN reviewer feels it is unchallenging and is a missed opportunity for storytelling. In the end Jeremy Peel of PCGamesN gives the score of 7.

Push Square reviewer feels the mechanism of investigations in the game "really adds to the atmosphere of Cold War conspiracy" and seems to like the macro-management in the game, calls it "the real meat of the campaign". However he feels that during missions the stealth approach "is painfully slow", while the combat "can sometimes feel cheap and frustrating". In the end he scores the game 7 out of 10.

The Trusted reviews reviewer criticises the combat system with no dice, based on the idea, that every shot would hit, but the target may dodge, which uses their awareness. The reviewer does not like that even a poorly trained enemy with a pistol (a short range weapon) can shoot from a long distance and still do some damage.

However the reviewer feels the game "nails the spy aesthetic" with several of the mechanics, for example the disguise system, support to team in action (cleaners that bag up bodies, spotters and snipers) and strategy on the global map. On the other hand, the reviewer has an impression that operating the detailed systems feels like busywork. The reviewer praises the part of the game with investigating evidence, calling it "one of the strongest elements in the game". In the end the reviewer gave the game 3 out of 5 stars.

Joel A. DeWitte of NintendoWorldReport likes the lack of dice rolls, while noting that it may disturb the players who "prefer the additional chance". However he does not like loading times (on Switch), noting that they "can mess with gameplay flow".

GameStar's reviewer likes graphics: things like flair of a secret agent, weather and light effects as well as hand-drawn cut-scenes, however he notes that the graphics do not change much, even though the agents travel all over the world. As far as the atmosphere is concerned he praises "well-spoken radio-messages", but calls the narrative "too confused" and "not exciting enough", however he appreciates that the agents in the game have their own life.

The reviewer appreciates complexity of expanding the player's organisation's base. However, he writes about deciphering evidence in the game: "This mini-game is really fun at first, but becomes increasingly annoying after a few hours."

As far as the missions are concerned, the GameStar's reviewer finds them lacking variety, but appreciates the player can "solve almost every mission in different ways". However the reviewer has a number of complaints: the player's enemy knows what the civilians can see, enemy reinforcements appear endlessly, it happens that they appear next to the player's agents in the getaway car, the weapons' range is not shown. Also, sneaking is too hard at the beginning of the game, and later it's too easy. However, the reviewer notes the developers are working on improvements.

Jeux Video notes that investigations are essential in a Cold War game and states: "Analyzing dozens of documents and interrogating is not tiresome, quite on the contrary". According to Jeux Video, on the other hand, the graphics "do not do justice to the atmosphere", although the menus with a lot of information are very readable. Jeux Video also observes the game's shortcoming; they observe: "It is not uncommon to suffer the assaults of a guard shooting through several windows and/or walls and hitting you."

NintendoLife reviewer criticises "too often a paper thin narrative", while appreciating strategic gameplay, which, according to him, "makes for some truly intense moments".

He appreciates the Nintendo Switch port, writing that it "runs well, with very few framerate drops or screen tearing". He mentions long loading times, but writes that considering how complicated the mission areas are, they are understandable.
