= Black Future '88 =

2019 video game

- Developer: SUPERSCARYSNAKES
- Publisher: Good Shepherd Entertainment
- Engine: Unity
- Platforms: Windows; Nintendo Switch
- Release: November 21, 2019
- Genre: Roguelike
- Modes: Single-player, multiplayer

Black Future '88 is a roguelike video game developed by SUPERSCARYSNAKES and published by Good Shepherd Entertainment. The game was released on November 21, 2019, for Windows and Nintendo Switch. Set in an alternate version of 1988, the game follows survivors of a nuclear apocalypse climbing to the top of a tower to before their hearts explode.

The PC version received mixed reviews, while the Switch version was met with more positive reception.

== Gameplay ==
Black Future '88 is a roguelike, in which the player controls a survivor of a nuclear apocalypse. The survivor has to climb a procedurally generated tower and stop the Architect from keeping time stuck in 1988. There are six characters available with different loadouts and traits. After 18 minutes, the character's heart explodes. The character can double jump, dash, and aim and shoot simultaneously. Each area of the tower is split into rooms that contain enemies, with a boss fight appearing every five or six screens. Defeated enemies drop currency that can be used to buy ammunition, health, and weapons. The number of weapons that can be picked up or purchased increases as more runs are completed.

== Development and release ==
Black Future '88 was developed by SUPERSCARYSNAKES. It was showcased at the Indie Megabooth during the 2018 Game Developers Conference. In October 2019, it was announced that the game would release on November 21 for PC and Nintendo Switch.

== Reception ==
Reception

Aggregate scores
Aggregator	Score
Metacritic	PC: 74/100 (Note: Score based on 7 reviews.); NS: 75/100 (Note: Score based on 19 reviews.)
OpenCritic	60% recommend

Review scores
Publication	Score
Hardcore Gamer	4/5
Nintendo Life	8/10
Nintendo World Report	7/10
Shacknews	6/10

Black Future '88 received "mixed or average" reviews on PC, while the Nintendo Switch version received "generally favorable" reviews, according to review aggregator Metacritic. Fellow review aggregator OpenCritic assessed that the game received fair approval, being recommended by 60% of critics.

Nintendo Life's Jake Baldwin wrote that the world reminiscent of Blade Runner, and that the cyberpunk visual style was "masterfully crafted". Baldwin felt that all rooms were "balanced to perfection". Conversely, Blake Morse of Shacknews believed the game lacked balance, but praised the retro style and the soundtrack.

Jordan Rudek from Nintendo World Report didn't like the time limit mechanic, and felt that the game was lacking in variety. Rudek liked the music selection, gameplay and visuals. Digitally Downloaded's Matt Sainsbury wrote that Black Future '88 was "quite exceptional", but thought it lacked the narrative to stand out. Kyle LeClair of Hardcore Gamer felt that the time limit and pacing left little room to develop the story, concluding that the game was "almost a quintessential throwback to '80s arcade games".
