= Transport Fever 2 =

2019 transport simulation video game

- Cover art
- Developer: Urban Games
- Publishers: Good Shepherd Entertainment; Nacon (console edition)
- Composer: Admiral James T.
- Series: Transport Fever
- Platforms: Microsoft Windows; macOS; Linux; PlayStation 4; PlayStation 5; Xbox One; Xbox Series X/S
- Release: Linux, Microsoft Windows; 11 December 2019; macOS; 23 February 2021; PlayStation 4, PlayStation 5, Xbox One, Xbox Series X/S; 9 March 2023
- Genre: Business simulation
- Mode: Single-player

Transport Fever 2 is a business simulation game developed by Urban Games and published by Good Shepherd Entertainment. It is the third video game of the Transport Fever franchise. The game was released for Microsoft Windows and Linux on 11 December 2019 and macOS on 23 February 2021, with the console versions of PlayStation 4, PlayStation 5, Xbox One and Xbox Series X/S released on 9 March 2023. A sequel, titled Transport Fever 3, announced on 21 May 2025, and was released on 29 September 2026.

== Gameplay ==
Similar in design to the first game of this series, Transport Fever 2 still focuses on the transport evolution of the past seventeen decades, from 1850 to date. The game consists of nearly 200 vehicles that are modelled from real life examples or historically accurate depictions. These include various examples of trains, buses, trams, trucks, airplanes and ferries. All of these vehicles are accessible from first-person camera angle. The campaign mode rewrites the transport history in comparison to Transport Fever, and takes place across three different continents. The game also features a sandbox mode, a map editor and mod tools.

== Development ==
Transport Fever 2 was announced in April 2019. It is developed by Urban Games, the developer of the Transport Fever franchise, and published by Good Shepherd Entertainment. The game was initially released for Microsoft Windows and Linux on 11 December 2019 worldwide on Steam, with a macOS version released later in February 2021.

In September 2022, Urban Games announced a major update, titled Transport Fever 2: Console Edition, would release on PlayStation 4, PlayStation 5, Xbox One and Xbox Series X and S, alongside a free update bringing the same "enhancements" including graphical updates and increased stability and performance to the PC version. The Console Edition was published by Nacon, and was released on 9 March 2023.

=== Downloadable content ===
On March 9, 2023, the deluxe edition upgrade pack for Transport Fever 2 was released on Steam by Urban Games and Good Shepherd Entertainment. As an exclusive limited-time offer, customers who purchased the downloadable content on or before March 16, 2023, were also granted the Early Supporter Pack at no additional cost. The Early Supporter Pack included five additional vehicle skins.

== Reception ==
Reception

Aggregate scores
Aggregator	Score
Metacritic	PC: 76/100; PS5: 80/100
OpenCritic	81% recommend

Review scores
Publication	Score
4Players	84/100
Famitsu	30/40
GameStar	85/100
PC Gamer (UK)	7.2/10
PC Games (DE)	8/10
Push Square	7/10
The Guardian	3/5

Transport Fever 2 received "generally favorable" reviews, according to review aggregator platform Metacritic. Fellow review aggregator OpenCritic assessed that the game received strong approval, being recommended by 81% of critics.

Matt S. of Digitally Downloaded rated the game four and a half out of five, and wrote: "It's elegantly presented and understands that some efficiencies are required for the sake of playability."

Rick Lane from The Guardian awarded the game three out of five. He compared the game with The Sims franchise of Maxis and Cities: Skylines of Colossal Order, commenting the growth of the in-game cities would bring players a lot of fun. However, despite Rick believing there to be a credible amount of detail, he felt the game lacked depth in certain areas.

Jeremy Peel of Rock Paper Shotgun implied the game had room to improve and wrote "A great management game is distinguished by its central lesson, and Transport Fever 2 has one worth learning."

The Xbox Series X/S version received four out of five from Gareth Brierley of TheXboxHub, who praised the game's campaign story as "A brilliant mode and gives you plenty to do with a superb historical backdrop that takes you around the world".

=== Sales ===
As of February 2021, Urban Games suggested that the game had sold about 500,000 copies, more than the original Transport Fever. It was announced that the game had sold over two million copies during the development of its sequel, Transport Fever 3.
