= Transport Fever =

Business video game series by Urban Games

- Genre: Business simulation
- Developer: Urban Games
- Publishers: Good Shepherd Entertainment; Paradox Interactive
- Composers: Admiral James T.; J.J. Ipsen
- Platforms: Linux; Microsoft Windows; OS X; PlayStation 4; PlayStation 5; Xbox One; Xbox Series X/S
- First release: Train Fever; 4 September 2014
- Latest release: Transport Fever 3; 29 September 2026

Transport Fever is a business video game series developed by Urban Games and published by Good Shepherd Entertainment. The franchise was introduced in 2014, when the first game was titled as Train Fever, with the latest game, titled Transport Fever 3, released on 29 September 2026.

== Games ==
Release timeline
2014	Train Fever
2015
2016	Transport Fever
2017
2018
2019	Transport Fever 2
2020
2021
2022
2023
2024
2025
2026	Transport Fever 3

Aggregate review scores As of 17 May 2020.
Game	Year	Metacritic
Train Fever	2014	67/100
Transport Fever	2016	71/100
Transport Fever 2	2019	PC: 76/100; PS5: 80/100
Transport Fever 3	2026	PC: 84/100; PS5: 77/100

=== Train Fever (2014) ===
The first video game of the series was initially released on 4 September 2014 for Microsoft Windows, macOS and Linux.

=== Transport Fever (2016) ===
A sequel, titled Transport Fever was announced in April 2016. It was available worldwide for Microsoft Windows on 8 November 2016.

=== Transport Fever 2 (2019) ===
Transport Fever 2 was initially available for Microsoft Windows and Linux via Steam on 11 December 2019. Urban Games remained to develop the game, with Good Shepherd Entertainment, which rebranded from Gambitious Digital Entertainment published the game. A macOS version released in autumn 2020 and console support was introduced in the course of game's updates.

=== Transport Fever 3 (2026) ===
Transport Fever 3 was announced on 21 May 2025, and was released on 29 September 2026 for Microsoft Windows, PlayStation 5 and Xbox Series X/S platforms. Paradox Interactive became the new video game publisher.
