= Double Cross (video game) =

Platform video game

- Developer: 13AM Games
- Publisher: Graffiti Games
- Director: Alex Rushdy
- Producer: Steph Sandercock
- Designers: Thomas McCall; Justin Fernandes
- Programmers: Marty Kugler; Michael Nicoletti; Elsio Perazzini Neto
- Artists: Takashi; Shawn Fraser; Aaron Kwapisinski; Michael Lambert; Lindsay Collins
- Writer: Unai Cabezón
- Composer: Dan Rodrigues
- Platforms: Windows; Nintendo Switch; Xbox One
- Release: Nintendo Switch; January 10, 2019; Xbox One: WW: June 19, 2019
- Genres: Action, platform
- Mode: Single-player

Double Cross is an action platform video game developed by 13AM Games for Microsoft Windows, Nintendo Switch and Xbox One, being the second game developed by the team. The game was released for the Nintendo Switch in January 2019.

== Gameplay ==
In Double Cross, the player controls Zahra Sinclair, an agent of RIFT who can jump, wall-jump, and use her proton slinger to grab certain objects or get across wide gaps via anchors, and also has a number of combat-based moves such as punching, rolling to parry attacks and obstacles, and healing herself. By defeating enemies, Zahra can obtain energy that fills an energy meter, which is used up in some of her combat moves. Zahra also gains new combat moves by collecting enough Upgradium in each level to level up; leveling up also allows Zahra access to certain equippable upgrades of which she can only hold three at a time. The game's visual style is presented through 2D vector character sprites and environments.

There are a grand total of thirteen levels in the game, with four levels in each of the three worlds, and one final level that is only unlocked once all three worlds are cleared and certain other conditions are met. Though the levels in each world are structured linearly, the player may complete each world in any order they wish barring the final level, similar to the Mega Man series. The first three levels of each world are unlocked by normal progression, but to reach the fourth and final level of each world as well as the final level, the player must gather clues by completing requests for other characters, completing certain levels, or simply checking various areas in the RIFT headquarters, to gather a complete case file to send to Commissioner Valerie Wiseheart. Each world has a distinct gameplay mechanic that is interspersed into its levels.

== Plot ==
Double Cross takes place in a world where interdimensional travel is possible. However, as this has led to negative consequences such as crime and contamination between worlds, a police force led by Valerie Wiseheart and Dash Sterling known as Regulators of Interdimensional Frontiers and Technology (RIFT) serves to maintain law and order between each dimension, with Zahra Sinclair being one of RIFT's top agents.

One day, a mysterious figure referred to as "Suspect X" steals the Metacatalyst, a weapon said to be majorly destructive, from the Extraverse. When Zahra arrives to stop him, "X" tells her to "leave RIFT" before escaping. Using the clues she obtained while confronting "X", and with the help of her coworkers, Zahra tracks "X"'s activities to Reptarria, the Funderdome, and Gootopia.

Zahra clears the trials of each world and respectively defeats crime bosses Ripjaw, Hancho, and even RIFT's own Freya Gronnalva, narrowing down her suspect list; as she does this, Zahra runs into a counterpart of herself who despises both "X" and RIFT because of an incident where "X" destroyed her world, and is herself horrified at RIFT's corruption. Zahra eventually narrows down her suspect list to her best friend, Skip Hollister, much to her chagrin.

After Zahra faces off against Rogue Zahra one last time, it is revealed that the real "X" had framed Skip to commence his invasion of the RIFT headquarters and overheat the station core. With some help from Skip, Zahra confronts "X", who is revealed to be a counterpart of Dash. RIFT's Dash then enters the scene, and reveals that he had staged the whole heist to get revenge on RIFT (especially strict director general Sorgina DeLabourde) for not treating his terminally ill son, the one person he loved more than anyone else in any universe. Zahra fights both Dashes with much difficulty; however, Rogue Zahra appears at the last moment and allows RIFT's Zahra to gain the upper hand, defeating the Dashes and foiling their scheme. Zahra is later promoted to elite agent to ensure RIFT is reformed, and celebrates with the other agents as Rogue Zahra thanks her counterpart for helping come to terms with their differences.

In a post-credits scene, an army of the remaining Dashes decide to enact revenge on behalf of their jailed counterparts.

== Development ==
Double Cross was announced on April 3, 2018, and was originally slated for a Summer 2018 release. Due to an overhaul in the gameplay and art style, the release date was pushed forward to January 2019.

== Reception ==
Reception

Aggregate scores
| Aggregator | Score |
|---|---|
| Metacritic | (NS) 67/100 |
| OpenCritic | 41% recommend |

Review scores
| Publication | Score |
|---|---|
| GameSpot | 6/10 |
| Nintendo Life | 6/10 |
| Nintendo World Report | 7/10 |

Double Cross received mixed to somewhat positive reviews upon its release. Critics lauded the platforming aspect and the varied level design, but heavily criticized the mystery-solving aspect and the combat structure, which many believed to be dull and repetitive. On the review aggregation website Metacritic, the game holds a score of 67 based on 22 reviews, indicating "mixed or average reviews". Fellow review aggregator OpenCritic assessed that the game received fair approval, being recommended by 41% of critics.

Heidi Kemps of GameSpot gave the game a 6/10, calling the proton slinger mechanic "special" and "a lot of fun", praising the move's effectiveness and especially the time slowdown, but found the combat "a sluggish, simplistic affair", concluding "Had Double Cross opted to focus more on its strength--fun physics platforming--and de-emphasized things like combat and the tedious mystery-solving element, the game would have been an easy recommendation. But the weak parts of the package drag down the whole, and Double Cross winds up feeling like it's a somewhat undercooked mash of ideas." Melanie Zawodniak of Nintendo World Report gave the game a 7/10, similarly praising the platforming and calling it "the 2D Spider-Man game I've always wanted", but was also similarly critical of the combat and the generic story, concluding "Double Cross is almost great. With all the different ways to use the proton slinger in this game, I definitely had a blast progressing through the levels. Unfortunately, the investigation and combat sections make for such dull interruptions that at least a third of your time spent as an agent of R.I.F.T. will be a forgettable slog. I'd love to see a sequel take the proton slinger and really run with it because there's a lot of potential the game leaves hanging."
