= Hard West =

2015 video game

- Cover art by Grzegorz Przybys
- Developer: CreativeForge Games
- Publisher: Gambitious Digital Entertainment
- Designers: Kacper Szymczak; Paweł Kroenke; Kuba Palyska; Jan Rawski; Maciej Stańczyk; Damian Wyspiański
- Programmers: Łukasz Żarnowiecki; Dominik Franosik; Sebastian Gorazd
- Artists: Remigiusz Nowakowski; Tomasz Ćwik; Krzysztof Sąpor; Krzysztof Deoniziak; Krzysztof Mąka
- Writers: Scott Alexander; Haris Orkin
- Composer: Marcin Przybyłowicz
- Engine: Unity
- Platforms: Microsoft Windows; OS X; Linux; Nintendo Switch; PlayStation 4
- Release: Windows, OS X, Linux; November 18, 2015; Nintendo Switch; March 7, 2019; Xbox One; June 19, 2020; PlayStation 4; June 28, 2020
- Genre: Turn-based tactics
- Mode: Single-player

Hard West is a turn-based tactical game developed by CreativeForge Games and published by Gambitious Digital Entertainment. It was released digitally on November 18, 2015, for Microsoft Windows, OS X and Linux, and was released for the Nintendo Switch on March 7, 2019. A sequel, Hard West 2, was released in August 2022.

== Setting ==
Hard West takes place in a heavily fictionalized version of the American Old West following standards of the Western genre but with the addition of supernatural elements, taking inspirations from XCOM: Enemy Unknown. Themes typical of the Western genre, such as bank robberies, lynching and the gold rush are commonplace in the game's world but also metaphysical beings such as Death and the Devil directly influence the lives of the local population. Creatures such as demons, ghosts and undead gunslingers are present in the game's vision of the old west.

== Gameplay ==
The game is divided into two strictly separate modes, turn-based tactical encounters and a strategic exploration map where the player can travel a map and visit locations. Location visits on the strategic map are presented via simple text panels accompanied by static illustrations and allow the player to perform actions by picking entries from a list. This way players can interact with characters, perform a variety of custom actions, hire new characters into the player character's posse or initiate trade or combat.

Hard West's tactical gameplay largely follows the standards set by XCOM: Enemy Unknown. During combat every character starts each turn with two action points which can be spent on either a move or shot each, although most weapons instantly end a character's turn upon being fired. The game also uses a cover system based on two cover types which lower the chance to get hit and damage received. Low barriers constitute "half cover" and barriers taller than a character constitute "full cover", the latter providing more protection.

A major difference from most other turn-based tactical games is the absence of randomness in Hard West's core gameplay. Rather than relying on random number generation to determine hits, characters are given a luck attribute. Luck is reduced by the hit chance of a shot and a character is hit if a shot depletes his luck. Luck is replenished upon getting hit. At point-blank range every shot automatically hits.

Over the course of the game characters can be improved and given special abilities, some of which are active and can be used instead of moving or firing while others are passive. Instead of relying on experience points and skill trees Hard West uses a custom system based on poker cards. After every tactical encounter or performing pre-defined actions on the strategic map the player is rewarded with unique poker cards which can be assigned to characters, each of them providing a different bonus. Arranging cards in poker hands yields additional bonuses.

Reaction shots replace the overwatch mechanic of XCOM. Approaching an enemy up to point-blank range makes him automatically fire at the approaching player character if he could already see the player character before executing the move. Player characters are not protected from enemies by a reaction shot.

== Development ==
Development on Hard West began before the release of CreativeForge Games' previous game, the sci-fi RTS game Ancient Space, and was first publicly announced in the context of its crowdfunding campaign on Kickstarter in August 2014 which quickly found support from well-known game developers such as John Romero and Brian Fargo. It had a goal of $70,000 CAD and reached $94,183 CAD pledged by 4,398 backers. On July 30, 2015, the developers announced that Gambitious Digital Entertainment would publish the game and soon-after announced a release set for November 4. On October 30 Gambitious announced that the release would be delayed by two weeks and the game was ultimately released on Steam on November 18, 2015. A limited physical release distributed by CDP.pl, including the soundtrack and a comic book, followed in early 2016.

In February 2016 development of DLC titled Scars of Freedom was announced which would move away from the supernatural themes of the base game towards Frankenstein-esque Gothic horror. It was also announced that the character customization system would be replaced with a new one based on harvesting organs and ether. The DLC was released on Steam and GOG.com on March 3, 2016.

A sequel developed by Ice Code Games and published by Good Shepherd Entertainment, titled Hard West II, has been announced, and was released for Windows via Steam and GOG on August 4, 2022.

== Reception ==
Reception

Aggregate score
Aggregator	Score
Metacritic	73/100

Review scores
Publication	Score
Destructoid	5/10
GameSpot	7/10
IGN	7.3/10
PC Gamer (US)	61/100

Aggregate review website Metacritic assigned it a score of 73/100 based on 42 critic reviews. Vince Ingenito from IGN awarded it a score of 7.3/10, saying "Hard West trades some tactical grit for a touch of mystical fun, and a flair for the supernatural." Tyler Wilde of PC Gamer awarded it a score of 6.1/10, saying "The presentation is aced, but Hard West's turn-based combat is too rote to be engrossing." Zack Fumiss from Destructoid awarded it a score of 5/10, saying "What I'd really like to see is a tabletop game in this setting, because it honestly feels like it might be better suited in that realm. Either way, I hope there'll be a reason to come back. Brett Todd of GameSpot awarded it 7/10, saying "Tactical combat fans and horror buffs alike will find a lot to like here in both the spooky surroundings and the shoot-em-up scenarios."
