= Renegade Kid =

American video game developer

Renegade Kid LLC
- Type: Private
- Industry: Video games
- Founded: 2007; 19 years ago
- Founders: Gregg Hargrove; Jools Watsham
- Defunct: August 29, 2016
- Fate: Dissolved
- Successors: Atooi; Infitizmo
- Headquarters: Austin, Texas, U.S.
- Key people: Gregg Hargrove; Jools Watsham
- Website: renegadekid.com

Renegade Kid LLC was an American independent video game developer based in Austin, Texas. The studio was founded in 2007 by Gregg Hargrove and Jools Watsham, video game development veterans formerly of Iguana Entertainment. It developed indie games prior to its closure in 2016. Watsham currently owns all rights of its output and continues to develop games under the brand Atooi.

== History ==
Prior to founding Renegade Kid, Gregg Hargrove and Jools Watsham had been working together for 12–13 years, starting at Iguana Entertainment. The two launched Renegade Kid in early 2007. Hargrove and Watsham incorporated their expertise in Nintendo 64 (N64) game development into Renegade Kid's projects, and Watsham described the Nintendo DS, which would become the studio's primary target platform, as "basically a portable N64". The studio's first game, Dementium: The Ward, was announced on March 5, 2007, and found Gamecock Media Group as its publisher by June. At that time, Renegade Kid had three employees.

In March 2012, Renegade Kid and Gamescribe jointly announced PitchWinPlay, a competition in which people could pitch their game ideas to the two companies, the winning entry would be developed as a game for the Nintendo eShop. However, the following July, Gamescribe announced that it was shutting down and PitchWinPlay was canceled. Also in 2012, Renegade Kid released Mutant Mudds, the first game it funded and published on its own. Afterward, Renegade Kid went back to cooperating with publishers. The studio arranged a publishing deal for a licensed game in which the publisher would grant Renegade Kid a budget of US$500,000 but only allocated $125,000 of those, keeping the remaining $375,000 locked down until the later stages of the game's development. This meant that any financial risk the publisher could have faced would have been shifted to the developer instead. Renegade Kid rejected the deal and, from that point on, turned its business model entirely to indie game development.

Renegade Kid's 2014 game Moon Chronicles sold poorly, and the studio struggled to survive. The situation stabilized following the release of Xeodrifter, but running the studio still proved to be a financial challenge for Hargrove and Watsham. As a result, the two decided to split up. On August 29, 2016, Renegade Kid announced that it was shutting down. The intellectual property rights were divided between the companies set up by Hargrove and Watsham independently: Atooi, founded by Watsham in 2015, obtained the rights for Renegade Kid's two-dimensional games (including Mutant Mudds and the then-in-development Treasurenauts), while Infitizmo, which was established in 2016 by Hargrove, received the three-dimensional titles (including Dementium and Moon Chronicles). Five games from the former were included in a compilation video game for the Nintendo 3DS, titled Atooi Collection and released on August 7, 2020 by Limited Run Games as the 3DS' final physical title prior to Nintendo's official discontinuation of the system.

In September 2018, Hargrove died of pancreatic cancer. Watsham negotiated with Hargrove's widow to acquire Infitizmo's intellectual properties and subsequently released remasters of the Dementium games.

== Games ==
Year	Title	Platform(s)	Publisher(s)
2007	Dementium: The Ward	Nintendo DS	Gamecock Media Group, SouthPeak Games
2009	Moon	Nintendo DS	Mastiff, Gamebridge
2010	Dementium II	Nintendo DS	SouthPeak Games
2011	ATV Wild Ride	Nintendo DS	Destineer
2011	Face Racers: Photo Finish	Nintendo 3DS	Majesco
2012	Mutant Mudds	iOS, Microsoft Windows, Nintendo 3DS	Renegade Kid
2012	Bomb Monkey	Nintendo 3DS	Renegade Kid
2012	Planet Crashers	Nintendo 3DS	UTV Ignition Games
2013	ATV Wild Ride 3D	Nintendo 3DS	Renegade Kid
2013	Mutant Mudds Deluxe	iOS, Microsoft Windows, Nintendo Switch, PlayStation 3, PlayStation 4, PlayStation Vita, Wii U	Renegade Kid
2014	Moon Chronicles	Nintendo 3DS	Renegade Kid
2014	Xeodrifter	Microsoft Windows, Nintendo 3DS, Nintendo Switch, PlayStation 4, PlayStation Vita, Wii U	Renegade Kid, Gambitious Digital Entertainment, Atooi
2015	Dementium Remastered	Nintendo 3DS, Nintendo Switch, PlayStation 4, PlayStation 5	Renegade Kid, Atooi
2016	Mutant Mudds Super Challenge	Microsoft Windows, Nintendo 3DS, Nintendo Switch, PlayStation 4, PlayStation Vita, Wii U	Renegade Kid, Atooi
2017	ATV Renegades	PlayStation 4, Xbox One	Nighthawk Interactive

=== Unreleased ===
- Demon's Crest (Game Boy Advance)
- Son of the Dragon (Wii)
- Crash Landed (Nintendo DS)
- Maximilian and the Rise of the Mutant Mudds (Nintendo DS)
- Razor Global Domination Pro Tour (PlayStation 4, Wii U, Xbox One)
- Cult County (macOS, Microsoft Windows, Nintendo 3DS, Linux, PlayStation 3, PlayStation 4, PlayStation Vita, Wii U, Xbox One)
- Dementium II Remastered (Nintendo 3DS)
