= Semblance (video game) =

2018 video game

- Developer(s): Nyamakop
- Publisher(s): Good Shepherd Entertainment
- Engine: Unity
- Platform(s): macOS, Windows, Nintendo Switch
- Release: 24 July 2018
- Genre(s): Puzzle-platform
- Mode(s): Single-player

Semblance is a 2018 puzzle-platform game developed by South African studio Nyamakop and published by Good Shepherd Entertainment. It was released on 24 July 2018 for Microsoft Windows, OS X and Nintendo Switch.

== Gameplay ==
Semblance is a 2D platform game where the player can deform parts of the platforms, which are made out of Play-Doh. Through a disaster, the blob-like creature the player controls the world of hardness that has infected the normally soft world. The deforming terrain enables the player to avoid dangerous obstacles and reach higher places.

== Release ==
The game was released on 24 July 2018.
