= Mutant Mudds =

2012 video game

- Developers: Renegade Kid; Atooi (Switch)
- Publishers: Renegade Kid; Atooi (Switch)
- Designer: Jools Watsham
- Programmer: Matthew Gambrell
- Artist: Jools Watsham
- Composer: Troupe Gammage
- Platforms: iOS; Microsoft Windows; Nintendo 3DS; Nintendo Switch; PlayStation 3; PlayStation 4; PlayStation Vita; Wii U
- Release: Nintendo 3DS: NA: January 26, 2012; EU: June 21, 2012; Microsoft Windows: WW: August 30, 2012; WW: November 21, 2013 (Deluxe); iOS: WW: December 5, 2012; Wii U: NA: June 13, 2013 (Deluxe); PlayStation 3, PlayStation Vita: NA: December 17, 2013 (Deluxe); PlayStation 4: NA: November 14, 2016 (Deluxe); Nintendo Switch: WW: December 14, 2017
- Genre: Platform
- Mode: Single-player

Mutant Mudds is a 2012 platform video game developed and published by Renegade Kid for the Nintendo 3DS. Players control Max and Granny as they combat the titular invaders following a meteorite crash. The game was first released as a Nintendo eShop exclusive in 2012, and arrived on Microsoft Windows and iOS in 2012. An enhanced version of the game, titled Mutant Mudds Deluxe, was released in 2013 for Wii U and Microsoft Windows, and in 2016 for PlayStation Vita and PlayStation 4. The Nintendo 3DS version was updated as the enhanced version in 2014.

In 2016, a successor, Mutant Mudds Super Challenge, was released for Wii U, Nintendo 3DS, PlayStation Vita, PlayStation 4 and Microsoft Windows. After Renegade Kid's dissolution, Watsham's company Atooi acquired the rights to the game; a Nintendo Switch compilation, titled Mutant Mudds Collection, was released in December 2017. It includes Mutant Mudds Deluxe, Mutant Mudds Super Challenge and Mudd Blocks, a puzzle game with elements from Mutant Mudds. Another collection, Atooi Collection, features both Mutant Mudds games and was released in 2020 for the Nintendo 3DS.

== Gameplay ==
The player uses the A or B button to jump once, and pressing that button again, while in midair, causes the character to hover for several seconds. The player can also shoot with either the X or Y buttons. Most enemies in the game must be shot several times to be killed. While standing on an orange launch pad, jumping will send you into the background, or foreground. The gameplay generally remains the same, as this is mainly to make use of the 3D capabilities of the 3DS. The PC version, due to the fact that 3D visuals aren't standard, uses a depth of field effect when it jumps between the background and foreground.

The main levels in the game are put into one of four "worlds". The later worlds' levels are only unlockable by defeating a certain number of previous stages. Within each level, there are three objectives. The main and most straightforward—one is simply to get to the end of the stage and collect the Water Sprite. The second objective is to collect all the golden diamonds for that level. In each one, there are exactly 100 golden diamonds scattered throughout the area. The third and usually most challenging objective is finding and completing the secret "land" hidden within each stage. There is a door labeled "CGA-land", "G-land" or "V-land" hidden somewhere in each area, and entering it transports Max to a short, but challenging, secret stage needed to fully complete the game.

At the start of every level, Max is given unlimited ammunition and three hearts. The character will lose one heart every time he runs into an enemy or any obstacle meant to cause him harm. Some obstacles, however, like spikes and lava, will instantly kill him. There is also a four-minute time limit (3DS version only) that will instantly end the player's game if the level is not completed within that time. By collecting enough golden diamonds, Max can unlock upgrades that he can equip one at a time: an extended jetpack for crossing larger gaps, a rocket jump for reaching high up areas and a bazooka for breaking through barriers. These must be used to access some of the G-Land and V-Land areas.

The 20 bonus levels, included in the PC version of the game and as free downloadable content for the 3DS version, sees players taking control of Max's grandmother, Granny. She is able to use all the upgrades simultaneously.

== Plot ==
The game begins with a short cutscene. It shows two people, one of them, Max, the main protagonist, sitting in a small living room and playing a video game, until a large meteor suddenly hits. The scene fades to black, then shows a news station on TV reporting on a "Muddy" invasion, and equipped with only a water gun and a jetpack, Max goes to stop the Mutant Mudds not long after. Legend has it that the Water Sprites are able to erase any kind of dirt or mud, and that collecting them all will get rid of the Mutant Mudds for good. After that, the player is immediately thrust into the tutorial level, where one learns the controls.

== Development and release ==
Mutant Mudds was developed and published by Renegade Kid, best known for its first-person shooters Moon and the Dementium series on the Nintendo DS. Mutant Mudds was first showcased at E3 2009 by the developer's co-founder Jools Watsham. The game was originally titled "Maximillian and the Rise of the Mutant Mudds" and was planned as a third-person shooter for release on the DS. According to Watsham, a team of four designers at Renegade Kid spent two weeks modifying the 3D graphical engine from Moon to create an early, polygonal incarnation of the game. However, the developer scrapped the idea when the game failed to attract publisher attention. In late 2010, Renegade posted a request to obtain the support of 1,000 fans to justify distributing the game on DSiWare via the Nintendo DSi. Again, Renegade Kid's plans fell through. Watsham suggested that the game was intended for Xbox Live Arcade at one point.

Mutant Mudds was reintroduced just prior to E3 2011 in a reworked, 2D side-scrolling format for the 3DS. The game's design was meant to resemble games of the 8-bit and 16-bit eras, promoted by Renegade Kid as a "12-bit" platformer. It was specifically inspired by a number of earlier platfomers including Super Mario World, Gargoyle's Quest, and Virtual Boy Wario Land. The last of these three games utilizes a 3D mechanic in which the player jumps between three different planes in the foreground and background, an effect Watsham attempted to build-upon for Mutant Mudds on the 3DS. Watsham explained that "only the essence" of the original, fully 3D version of the game was carried over for the side-scrolling version; he felt that 2D platforming offers more precise gameplay than those in 3D. Mutant Mudds was created by only three people: Watsham, Matthew Gambrell and Troupe Gammage. Watsham was the game's main artist and designer. Gambrell handled the game's programming, as he had experience with 2D platfomers. Gammage composed the game's 21-track musical score, which was made available on the developer's website with an open pricetag.

Mutant Mudds was originally supposed to be released in December 2011, but was delayed due to Nintendo's approval process and the holidays. The game was officially launched on the North American version of the Nintendo eShop on January 26, 2012. Renegade Kid was greatly satisfied with the finished product and its reception, which Watsham attributed to the designers' full creative control over the game's development. "We were not only able to create what we wanted but also present it to the world how we wanted," he elaborated. "How the game is presented to the world can be just as important as the quality of the game in terms of people’s opinions and expectations of a game." Watsham stated that the developer opted out of including downloadable content (DLC) because it would have delayed the release. "It was important for us to have Mutant Mudds released as soon as possible on the eShop, while maintaining the same quality and scope we originally envisioned for the game," Watsham explained. "I see the value in DLC, so I hope we can support it in the future somehow." The game was made available for purchase in North America from the Nintendo eShop on January 26, 2012, and June 21, 2012, in Europe. A version for Microsoft Windows containing additional content was released on August 30, 2012.

A demo of the game was released on the North American eShop on March 29, 2012, two months after the full game. The game later got a European release on June 21, 2012. 20 additional levels from the PC version were released for free on the Nintendo eShop on October 25, 2012. Renegade Kid also plans to release a sequel in the future.

== Reception ==
Reception

Aggregate scores
Aggregator	Score
GameRankings	82%
Metacritic	80/100

Review scores
Publication	Score
1Up.com	B+
Eurogamer	7/10
GameSpot	7.5/10
IGN	8.5/10
Nintendo World Report	9/10

Mutant Mudds has been well received by most critics, holding an average score of 82% on GameRankings and 80% on Metacritic with praise for its level design and gameplay.

== Sequel and legacy ==
A sequel to Mutant Mudds was announced in 2013, and was released digitally in 2016 as Mutant Mudds: Super Challenge for non-Microsoft eighth-generation platforms. The story is similar, where Max goes to investigate another meteorite crash and is set to retrieve 45 Water Sprites to stop the Mudds' invasion on Earth. Once done, Granny goes into a spaceship and set to the Mudds' planet to end it all for good. The game received mostly positive reviews with particular praise for its challenging gameplay and level design. The Wii U version has a score of 83/100 and the PS4 version has a score of 78/100 on Metacritic, both indicating "generally favourable reviews".

Max was planned to appear as a playable cameo character in the unreleased Wii U and PC game Hex Heroes.

Mutant Mudds was also included in a special compilation video game based on Renegade Kid's 2D games, titled Atooi Collection and named after one of the two successor splinter companies formed after Renegade Kid's dissolution in 2016 and the current owner of the rights to such games. The collection was released physically by Limited Run Games on the Nintendo 3DS on August 7, 2020 as the last physical game for the system before Nintendo announced its discontinuation.
