= Semblance analysis =

Semblance analysis is a process used in the refinement and study of seismic data. The use of this technique along with other methods makes it possible to greatly increase the resolution of the data despite the presence of background noise. The new data received following the semblance analysis is usually easier to interpret when trying to deduce the underground structure of an area. Weighted semblance can be used for increasing the resolution of traditional semblance or make traditional semblance capable of analyzing more complicated seismic data.

== History ==
Semblance analysis is a technique that first began to be developed and used in the late 1960s. Prior to the discovery of this method, identifying the main reflections produced by the many layers under the ground was fairly difficult. The primary reflections of these layers were often obscured by the background noise as well as noise from the many secondary reflections that are produced. The use of semblance analysis allows for the removal of the extra noise and leaves only the primary reflection.

== Process ==
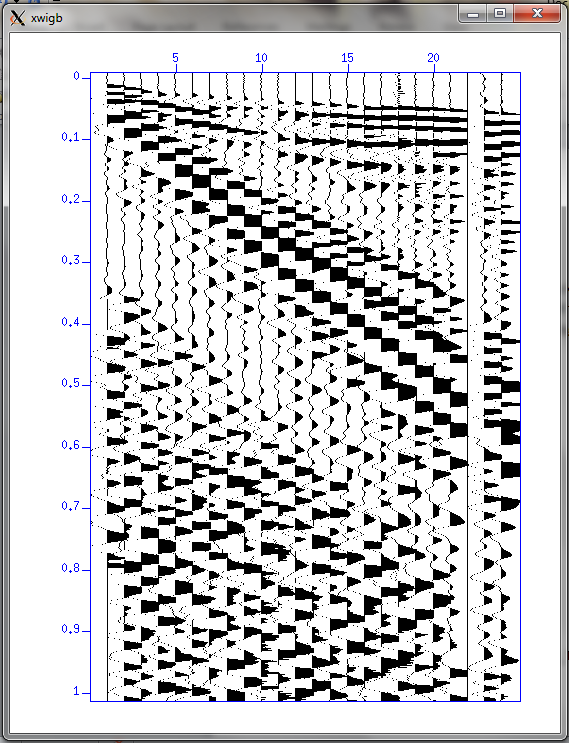
Uncorrected data showing hyperbolic curve.

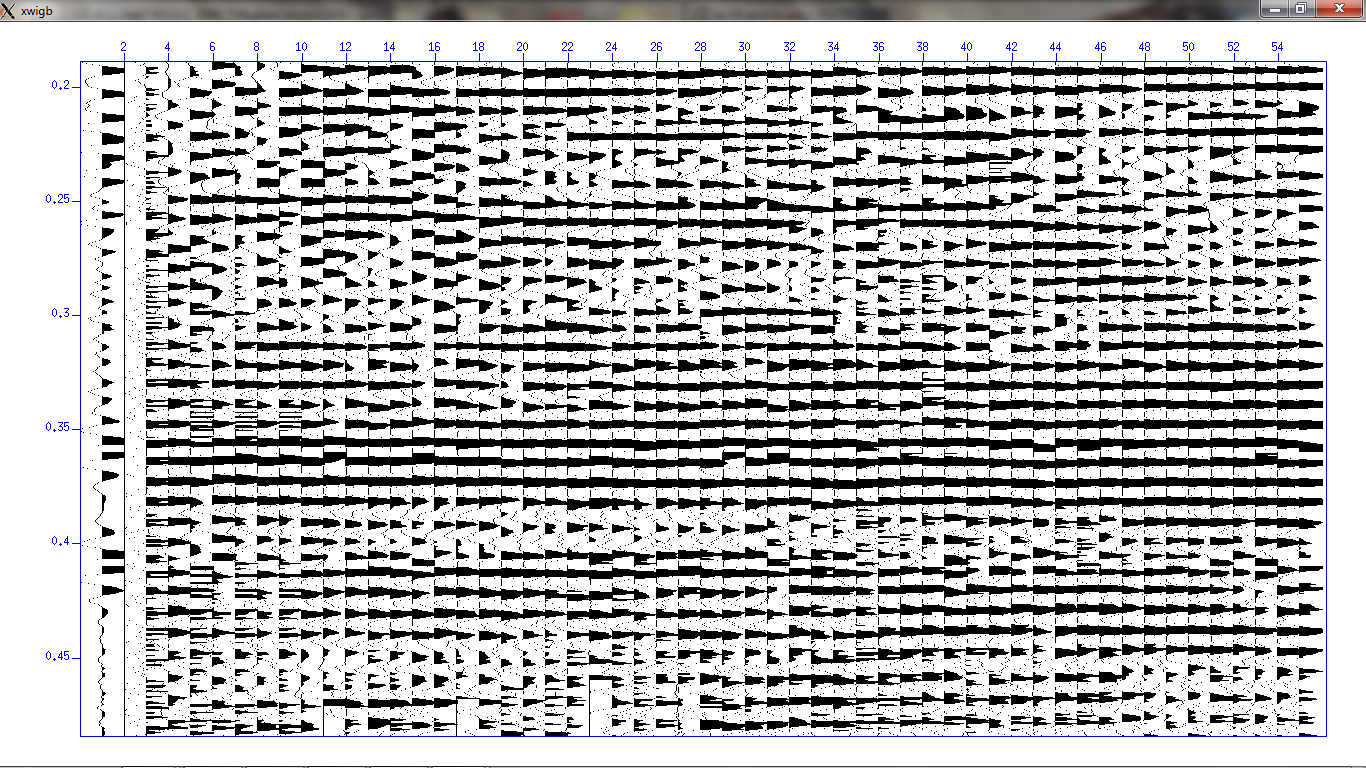
Corrected data.

Semblance analysis allows for the refinement of seismic data. This is done by developing a velocity spectra display to determine the velocity through different layers at depth. The easiest way to accomplish this is by recording the normal incidence path (NIP). The NIP is where you have the shot and the geophone in the same location and the path taken by the recorded sound waves is perpendicular to the boundaries between the layers. This path represents the shortest amount of time that can be taken to reach a layer and return. With this information it becomes fairly easy to calculate the velocity of the waves as they travel through each layer by using the equation for the root mean square velocity starting with the top layer and working downward.

$$V_\mathrm{rms} =  \sqrt { \frac { \sum t_i \cdot {V_i}^2 }{\sum t_i} }$$

Once all of the velocities for the layers are known then it is possible to calculate the time needed for the wave to travel the distance down to the midpoint between each geophone and the shot point for each of the layers. As the geophones are farther away from the shot, the more the time taken for the wave to travel there increases, this forms a hyperbola in a graph of time vs. distance. The velocity data is used to correct the curves of the hyperbolas and create a flat line where all points are at an equal depth. The final step for the semblance analysis is to sum all of the data that has been corrected for velocity. This is done with the use of a computer filter to sum together all of the events that the traces share, then remove the ones they don't. The result is a single data set that has all of the primary peaks strongly displayed with most of the noise removed.

== Problems ==
While this technique can be very useful in the analysis there are several situations in which it will not work. Semblance analysis will not work properly when the offset from the shot is greater than the depth of the reflecting layers because the data no longer has a hyperbolic pattern. To correct this it is necessary to use more complex equations that model non-hyperbolic moveout. Also in situations where there is large offset there can also be polarity reversals with moveout then the data will be heavily distorted. To make moveout analysis suitable for data with polarity reversals a method known as AK semblance developed. This method first worked only for 2D models but has since been further refined for 3D as well.
