= Dementium: The Ward =

2007 video game

- Developers: Renegade Kid; Atooi (Switch, PS)
- Publishers: Nintendo DS: NA: Gamecock Media Group; EU: SouthPeak Games; Nintendo 3DS; Renegade Kid; Switch, PS4, PS5, Windows; Atooi
- Director: Jools Watsham
- Designer: Jools Watsham
- Programmer: Bob Ives
- Artist: Gregg Hargrove
- Composers: Jools Watsham; Gareth Vilday
- Platforms: Nintendo DS, Nintendo 3DS, Nintendo Switch, PlayStation 4, PlayStation 5, Windows
- Release: Nintendo DS: NA: October 31, 2007; EU: April 17, 2009; Nintendo 3DS: NA: December 3, 2015; EU: February 11, 2016; Nintendo Switch: WW: October 12, 2023; PlayStation 4, PlayStation 5: WW: April 19, 2024; Windows: WW: October 27, 2025
- Genres: Survival horror, first-person shooter
- Mode: Single-player

Dementium: The Ward is a survival horror first-person shooter video game developed by Renegade Kid for the Nintendo DS. The game was released in North America on October 31, 2007, published by Gamecock Media Group. After Renegade Kid gained back the rights to the title, an enhanced version of the game was announced under the title of Dementium Remastered for the Nintendo 3DS. The remastered version was released in North America on December 3, 2015, and Europe on February 11, 2016, with the company's successor Atooi developing remasters for additional platforms.

== Gameplay ==
In Dementium: The Ward, the player takes the role of William Redmoor, a man with amnesia, and has to venture through a hospital's rooms and hallways in order to find the exit and escape the establishment. The game uses a first-person view. In order to advance in the game, the player has to resolve puzzles and defeat monsters. At the beginning, William only has access to a nightstick that he can use to defend himself against enemies in addition to a flashlight. As the game progresses, he finds more weapons, such as a revolver. The console's touch screen is used to move the character's vision, to change weapons and to interact with some nearby elements. It also displays the health bar and can show a map or the player's inventory. In addition, the player is also equipped with a notebook in which they can jot down clues with the stylus.

== Plot ==
The protagonist, William Redmoor, wakes up in a medical ward with amnesia. Equipped with a flashlight, he discovers that the hospital he is in is abandoned and crawling with unspeakable creatures. As he makes his descent from the seventh floor, Redmoor collects more weapons in his effort to make progress.

Throughout the game, Redmoor discovers newspaper clippings and staff notes about a man who brutally murdered his wife, and that authorities believe that Redmoor is the killer. He also sees visions of his daughter Amanda running in the corridor as well as a man dressed in black who calls himself 'The Doctor.'

After battling his way through the derelict hospital, Redmoor encounters the Doctor in the basement, who possesses supernatural powers. Defeating him triggers an ending where Redmoor is seen reuniting with his wife and child in a well lit room. However, this appears to be only a dream as it immediately cuts to a scene where Redmoor is being lobotomised by the Doctor. The Doctor then concludes that the patient has successfully completed phase 1 and is now ready for phase 2.

== Development ==
The first game to be developed by Renegade Kid, a studio formed from Iguana Entertainment alumni, Dementium: The Ward was originally planned as a Silent Hill game for the Nintendo DS. In meetings with multiple publishers, Konami turned down their pitch, causing the team to create an original game instead when Gamecock agreed to publish the game.

Renegade Kid developed a Nintendo 3DS remaster to fix problems with the original release. After the company was closed on 2016, the intellectual property of the game was acquired by Gregg Hargrove's studio Infitizmo, with Jools Watsham's studio Atooi acquiring the intellectual property after Hargrove's death from pancreatic cancer in 2018. Atooi developed remasters of the game for modern consoles.

== Reception ==
Reception

Aggregate score
Aggregator	Score	
Aggregator	3DS	DS
Metacritic	57/100	72/100

Review scores
Publication	Score	
Publication	3DS	DS
Destructoid	1/10	8.5/10
Edge	N/A	5/10
Eurogamer	N/A	7/10
Famitsu	N/A	30/40
Game Informer	N/A	5.75/10
GamePro	N/A	4/5
GameRevolution	N/A	C+
GameSpot	N/A	7.5/10
GameSpy	N/A	3.5/5
IGN	N/A	8/10
Nintendo Life	7/10	7/10
Nintendo Power	N/A	8.5/10
Nintendo World Report	7.5/10	7/10
411Mania	N/A	8.4/10
The A.V. Club	N/A	B

Awards
Publication	Award
IGN	Best First-Person Shooter
IGN	Best Graphics Technology

Dementium and Dementium Remastered received "mixed or average reviews" according to the review aggregation website Metacritic.

Craig Harris of IGN said that the visuals were "outstanding: the lighting effects and texture work in Dementium: The Ward are pretty special when you consider the Nintendo DS' capabilities." He also noted "the flashlight effect might not match what other developers have done on more powerful systems" but "it's a believable technique that's pulled off better than anything seen on same-level hardware." Pete Sellers of Deeko was more positive, commenting on the DS version's many pros and few cons in a parody of The Raven by Edgar Allan Poe: "Visually, Dementium's divine and every facet is designed / To create a sense of ambience that offers frights galore. ... / If you've the guts to enduring gaming in which you do lots of playing / All the while softly praying, preying on some churlish horde, / Go out and buy this game now quickly! Preying on churlish horde / Within Dementium: The Ward!" The DS version was criticized most prominently for its short length and lack of replayability; but also for its save system, and that most of the in-game enemies respawn on revisit, leaving a player short on items and ammunition and discouraging exploration.

In Japan, where the DS version was ported and published by Interchannel-Holon on June 26, 2008, Famitsu gave it a score of two eights, one six, and one eight, for a total of 30 out of 40. On September 22, 2008, the Japanese Association of Psychiatric Hospitals published a protest against the DS version, asking it to be taken off the shelves because "the game uses the tradition of psychiatry in name but uses imagery of attacking patients".

The DS version sold more than 100,000 copies worldwide.

== Legacy ==
Following the release of the sequel Dementium II, Renegade Kid lost the rights to the intellectual property due to licensing agreements with the publisher. The studio created a spiritual successor, Cult County, which it attempted to fund through a crowdfunding campaign on Kickstarter. The campaign, started in 2014, failed to meet its funding goal of US$580,000.

Renegade Kid regained the rights to Dementium in September 2014. The studio released a remaster of the game, Dementium Remastered, in 2015 with enhancements including checkpoints and improved graphics. Watsham later announced a remaster of Dementium II as well as the third entry in the series. When Renegade Kid was dissolved in 2016, co-founder Gregg Hargrove retained the rights under his company Infitizmo. Hargrove died from pancreatic cancer in 2018. In April 2023, Watsham tweeted that his company Atooi had retained the rights to Dementium, hinting of potential sequels and ports. On September 28, Atooi announced a port for the Nintendo Switch and it will be released on October 12 the same year, with versions for PlayStation 4 and PlayStation 5 releasing the following year on April 19, 2024. On October 25, 2025, Atooi released a Windows version on Steam.
