= Transport Fever 3 =

2026 transport simulation video game

- Cover art
- Developer: Urban Games
- Publisher: Paradox Interactive
- Composer: J.J. Ipsen
- Series: Transport Fever
- Platforms: Linux; MacOS; PlayStation 5; Windows; Xbox Series X/S
- Release: 29 September 2026
- Genre: Business simulation
- Mode: Single-player

Transport Fever 3 is a business simulation game developed by Urban Games and published by Paradox Interactive. It is the fourth installment of the Transport Fever series, and is a sequel to Transport Fever 2. The game was released on Linux, MacOS, PlayStation 5, Windows and Xbox Series X/S on 29 September 2026.

== Gameplay ==
Compared to Transport Fever 2, Transport Fever 3 features a completely overhauled map generation system utilizing node-based technology. This allows for seamless transitions between different biomes within a single map, such as swamps flowing into coastlines or deserts transitioning into canyons. Environments include tropical shores, sub-arctic tundras, deserts, and jungles. For the first time in the series, a fully featured day-night cycle is included, featuring dynamic lighting and physical skies. Terrain interaction has been deepened; players must choose between adapting routes to the landscape or terraforming. Significant modification of the landscape, such as bulldozing through terrain, now negatively impacts the satisfaction of the local population, introducing a trade-off between construction costs, speed, and public approval. An improved in-game map editor allows players to import heightmaps or sculpt landscapes from scratch.

Infrastructure tools have been rebuilt to offer greater control. Road construction allows for free-form shaping, custom intersection designs, and lane-specific traffic flow management. Rail networks have been expanded to include line-specific train priorities and distinct track types that impact gameplay. Tram networks can now utilize dedicated tracks and operate underground. The simulation of city growth is influenced by negative externalities; growing cities generate traffic, noise, and pollution. Additionally, vehicle maintenance is now a dynamic mechanic where vehicles wear down over time, with neglect leading to tangible consequences. Passenger satisfaction and city growth are directly tied to travel time and comfort.

The cargo system has been redesigned to give players full control over the delivery chain. To maximize efficiency, players can utilize new facilities such as warehouses, industry boosters, and specialized loading stations. The economic model requires players to manage supply chains ranging from feeding small settlements to supplying high-demand capital cities.

== Development and release ==
The game was announced in May 2025, following the success of Transport Fever 2. It was reported that the budget of the game was over $25 million, the highest of the series. The game was launched for PlayStation 5, Windows and Xbox Series X/S on 29 September 2026. MacOS and Linux would also be supported from the first day of release.

In May 2026, the developer Urban Games announced that Paradox Interactive will publish the game.

== Reception ==
Reception

Aggregate scores
Aggregator	Score
Metacritic	PC: 83/100; PS5: 78/100
OpenCritic	96% recommend

Review scores
Publication	Score
GameStar	88/100
Hardcore Gamer	4/5
PC Games (DE)	8.5/10
PCGamesN	8/10

Transport Fever 3 received "generally favorable" reviews, according to review aggregator platform Metacritic. Fellow review aggregator OpenCritic assessed that the game received strong approval, being recommended by 96% of critics.
