= List of Stadia games =

This is a list of games that were available for purchase on the Stadia cloud gaming service from Google, which has now been discontinued.

At the time of the service's shuttering in January 2023, there were 280 titles on this list. Of these, five were Stadia exclusives during the lifespan of the platform as of the date the shutdown was announced. Additionally, Worm Game, a game originally made for internal testing of the service, was released five days before the service shut down as the platform's only first-party title. The exclusives are marked in yellow and with (§). Some of the exclusive titles have since been released elsewhere, although Outcasters was already in maintenance mode at the time of the service shutdown and its publisher stated that it would not be re-released.

Overview of Stadia games
Title	Genre(s)	Developer(s)	Publisher(s)	Stadia release date	Original release date (Note: Date of first completed public release, regardless of platform or region.)	Date added to Stadia Pro (Note: Free with paid subscription to Stadia Pro)	Date no longer claimable on Stadia Pro (Note: Date the game was no longer able to be claimed with Stadia Pro. Any player who claimed the game prior to this date could continue to play it with a Pro subscription.)	Ref.
A Place for the Unwilling	Adventure	ALPixel Games		February 23, 2021	July 25, 2019			
Adam Wolfe	Adventure, Puzzle	Mad Head Games		March 1, 2022	October 7, 2016	March 1, 2022		
Adventure Time: Pirates of the Enchiridion	Action-adventure	Climax Studios	Outright Games	March 25, 2022	July 17, 2018			
Arcade Paradise	Business simulation, Arcade	Nosebleed Interactive	Wired Productions	October 13, 2022	August 11, 2022			
Ark: Survival Evolved	Survival	Studio Wildcard	Studio Wildcard	September 1, 2021	August 29, 2017			
Ary and the Secret of Seasons	Action-adventure	eXiin, Fishing Cactus	Modus Games, Maximum Games	November 5, 2020	September 1, 2020	January 1, 2021	July 1, 2021	
Assassin's Creed III Remastered	Action role-playing	Ubisoft Montreal	Ubisoft	December 14, 2021	October 30, 2012			
Assassin's Creed IV: Black Flag	Action role-playing	Ubisoft Montreal	Ubisoft	September 14, 2021	October 29, 2013			
Assassin's Creed Odyssey	Action role-playing	Ubisoft Quebec	Ubisoft	November 19, 2019	October 5, 2018			
Assassin's Creed Origins	Action role-playing	Ubisoft Montreal	Ubisoft	December 15, 2020	October 27, 2017			
Assassin's Creed Syndicate	Action role-playing	Ubisoft Quebec	Ubisoft	December 15, 2020	October 23, 2015			
Assassin's Creed Unity	Action role-playing	Ubisoft Montreal	Ubisoft	December 15, 2020	November 11, 2014			
Assassin's Creed Rogue	Action role-playing	Ubisoft Sofia	Ubisoft	October 5, 2021	November 11, 2014			
Assassin's Creed Valhalla	Action role-playing	Ubisoft Montreal	Ubisoft	November 10, 2020	November 10, 2020			
Attack on Titan 2: Final Battle	Hack and slash	Omega Force	Koei Tecmo	November 19, 2019	March 15, 2018			
AVICII Invector	Music video game	Hello There		March 1, 2021	December 10, 2019	March 1, 2021	March 1, 2022	
Ben 10: Power Trip	Adventure, Puzzle	PHL Collective	Outright Games	October 15, 2021	October 7, 2020			
Blaze and the Monster Machines: Axle City Racers	Racing	3DClouds	Outright Games	December 1, 2021	October 1, 2021			
Bloodstained: Ritual of the Night	Action role-playing	ArtPlay	505 Games	July 6, 2021	June 18, 2019	January 1, 2022		
Blue Fire	Action-adventure	Robi Studios	Graffiti Games	June 1, 2021	February 4, 2021	June 1, 2021		
Borderlands 3	First-person shooter	Gearbox Software	2K	December 17, 2019	September 13, 2019			
Bratz: Flaunt Your Fashion	Action, adventure	Petoons Studio	Outright Games	November 4, 2022				
Cake Bash	Party, Beat 'em up	High Tea Frog	Coatsink	October 15, 2020	October 15, 2020	October 1, 2021		
Celeste	Platform	Extremely OK Games		July 28, 2020	January 25, 2018	October 1, 2020	January 1, 2021	
Chicken Police - Paint it RED!	Adventure, Puzzle	The Wild Gentlemen	HandyGames	December 6, 2021	November 5, 2020	April 1, 2022		
Child of Light	Platform Role-playing	Ubisoft Montreal	Ubisoft	October 19, 2021	April 30, 2014			
Chorus	Space combat	Fishlabs, Dambuster Studios	Deep Silver	December 3, 2021	December 3, 2021			
Chronos: Before the Ashes	Action role-playing	Gunfire Games	THQ Nordic	December 1, 2020	December 1, 2020	June 1, 2021	September 1, 2021	
Cities: Skylines	City-building game	Colossal Order	Paradox Interactive	May 17, 2022	March 10, 2015	May 17, 2022		
City Legends: The Curse of the Crimson Shadow	Adventure	Domini Games	Legacy Games	April 1, 2022	September 21, 2021	April 1, 2022		
Control	Action-adventure	Remedy Entertainment	505 Games	July 27, 2021	August 27, 2019	October 1, 2021		
Cosmic Star Heroine	Role-playing	Zeboyd Games		April 1, 2021	April 11, 2017	February 1, 2022		
Crayta	Game creation system, Sandbox	Unit 2 Games		July 1, 2020	July 1, 2020	July 1, 2020	April 1, 2022	
Cris Tales	Role-playing	Dreams Uncorporated, SYCK	Modus Games	July 20, 2021	July 20, 2021			
Cthulhu Saves Christmas	Role-playing	Zeboyd Games		December 22, 2020	December 23, 2019	December 22, 2020	January 1, 2022	
Cyberpunk 2077	Action role-playing	CD Projekt Red	CD Projekt	December 10, 2020	December 10, 2020			
Darksiders Genesis	Action role-playing	Airship Syndicate	THQ Nordic	December 5, 2019	December 5, 2019	March 1, 2022		
Darksiders II	Action role-playing	Gunfire Games	THQ Nordic	September 1, 2021	October 27, 2015	September 1, 2021	March 1, 2022	
Darksiders III	Action role-playing	Gunfire Games	THQ Nordic	September 14, 2021	November 27, 2018	January 1, 2022		
Darkwood	Survival horror	Acid Wizard Studio		September 7, 2021	August 17, 2017	March 1, 2022		
Dawn of the Monsters	Fighting	3AM Games	WayForward	March 1, 2022	March 1, 2022	March 1, 2022		
Dead by Daylight	Survival horror	Behaviour Interactive		October 1, 2020	June 14, 2016	October 1, 2020	January 1, 2021	
DEATHRUN TV	Top-down shooter	Laser Dog	Merge Games	June 1, 2022	June 13, 2021	June 1, 2022		
Deliver Us the Moon	Platform	KeokeN Interactive	Wired Productions	June 1, 2022	September 28, 2018	June 1, 2022		
Destiny 2	First-person shooter	Bungie		November 19, 2019	September 6, 2017	November 19, 2019	November 19, 2020 (Note: The game became free-to-play since it left Pro.)	
Destroy All Humans!	Action-adventure	Black Forest Games	THQ Nordic	December 8, 2020	July 28, 2020	December 1, 2021		
Dirt 5	Racing	Codemasters		March 24, 2021	November 6, 2020	November 1, 2021	February 1, 2022	
Disco Elysium: The Final Cut	Adventure RPG	Iam8bit		March 30, 2021	October 15, 2019			
Doom 64	First-person shooter	Nightdive Studios	Bethesda Softworks	May 12, 2020	April 4, 1997			
Doom	First-person shooter	id Software	Bethesda Softworks	August 18, 2020	May 13, 2016			
Doom Eternal	First-person shooter	id Software	Bethesda Softworks	March 20, 2020	March 20, 2020			
Dragon Ball Xenoverse 2	Fighting	Dimps	Bandai Namco Entertainment	December 17, 2019	October 25, 2016			
Dragon Ball Z: Kakarot	Action role-playing	CyberConnect2	Bandai Namco Entertainment	October 26, 2021	January 17, 2020			
Dragon Quest XI	Role-playing	Square Enix		March 16, 2021	July 29, 2017			
DreamWorks Dragons Dawn of the New Riders	Adventure	Climax Studios	Outright Games	August 13, 2021	February 1, 2019	January 1, 2022		
DreamWorks Spirit Lucky’s Big Adventure	Adventure	AHEARTFULOFGAMES	Outright Games	October 1, 2021	June 1, 2021	October 1, 2021	April 1, 2022	
Dynasty Warriors 9: Empires	Strategy	Koei Tecmo Games		February 15, 2022	December 23, 2021			
El Hijo - A Wild West Tale	Puzzle	Honig Studios	HandyGames	December 3, 2020	December 3, 2020	January 1, 2021	May 1, 2021	
Elemental War 2	Tower defense	Clockwork Origins		May 6, 2022	December 9, 2021			
Embr	Action	Muse Games	Curve Digital	May 21, 2020	2020	September 1, 2020	January 1, 2021	
Enter the Gungeon	Action, roguelike	Dodge Roll	Devolver Digital	December 22, 2020	April 5, 2016	February 1, 2021	May 1, 2021	
Epistory – Typing Chronicles	action-adventure, typing video game	Fishing Cactus		February 2, 2021	March 30, 2016	August 1, 2021		
Everspace	Space combat, roguelike	Rockfish Games		December 1, 2020	May 25, 2017	December 1, 2020		
F1 2020	Racing	Codemasters Birmingham	Codemasters	July 7, 2020	July 7, 2020	January 1, 2021	April 1, 2021	
The Falconeer: Warrior Edition	Aerial combat	Tomas Sala	Wired Productions	December 1, 2021	August 5, 2021	December 1, 2021		
Family Feud	Party, Game show	Snap Finger Click	Ubisoft	November 12, 2020	November 12, 2020			
Far Cry 3: Blood Dragon Classic Edition	First-person shooter	Ubisoft Montreal	Ubisoft	July 7, 2022	April 30, 2013			
Far Cry 5	First-person shooter	Ubisoft Montreal	Ubisoft	November 3, 2020	March 27, 2018			
Far Cry 6	First-person shooter	Ubisoft Toronto	Ubisoft	October 7, 2021	October 7, 2021			
Far Cry New Dawn	First-person shooter	Ubisoft Montreal	Ubisoft	November 3, 2020	February 15, 2019			
Far Cry Primal	First-person shooter	Ubisoft Montreal	Ubisoft	May 17, 2022	February 23, 2016			
Farming Simulator 19	Simulation	Giants Software	Focus Home Interactive	November 19, 2019	November 20, 2018	December 1, 2019	March 1, 2020	
Farming Simulator 22	Simulation	Giants Software	Giants Software	November 21, 2021	November 21, 2021			
Fast and Furious: Spy Racers Rise of SH1FT3R	Racing, Action	3DClouds	Outright Games	January 25, 2022	November 5, 2021	July 1, 2022		
FIFA 21	Sports simulation	EA Vancouver	Electronic Arts	March 17, 2021	October 9, 2020			
FIFA 22	Sports simulation	EA Vancouver	Electronic Arts	October 1, 2021	October 1, 2021			
FIFA 23	Sports simulation	EA Vancouver	Electronic Arts	September 30, 2022	September 30, 2022			
Figment	Action-adventure	Bedtime Digital Games		December 8, 2020	September 22, 2017	January 1, 2021	January 1, 2022	
Final Fantasy XV	Action role-playing	Square Enix		November 19, 2019	November 29, 2016			
Five Nights at Freddy's: Security Breach	Survival horror	Steel Wool Studios	ScottGames	July 1, 2022	December 16, 2021	July 1, 2022		
Floor Kids	Rhythm	MERJ Media		April 14, 2021	December 7, 2017	May 1, 2021	May 1, 2022	
Football Manager 2020	Business simulation	Sports Interactive	Sega	November 19, 2019	November 18, 2019			
Foreclosed	Action-adventure	Antab Studio	Merge Games	August 12, 2021	August 12, 2021	December 1, 2021		
Get Packed	Party, Action	Moonshine Studios	Coatsink	April 28, 2020	April 28, 2020	June 1, 2020	September 1, 2020	
Gigantosaurus: The Game	Adventure, Platform	Wild Sphere	Outright Games	August 13, 2021	March 27, 2020			
Gods Will Fall	Action-adventure	Clever Beans	Deep Silver	January 29, 2021	January 29, 2021			
Golf with Your Friends	Casual, sports	Blacklight Interactive	Team17	April 14, 2022	May 19, 2020	June 1, 2022		
Grid	Racing	Codemasters		November 19, 2019	October 11, 2019	March 1, 2020	September 1, 2020	
Grime	Action-adventure	Clover Bite	Akupara Games	August 2, 2021	December 15, 2020	August 2, 2021		
Gunsport	Sports, Co-op	Necrosoft Games		September 1, 2020	September 1, 2020	September 1, 2020	September 1, 2021	
Gylt (§)	Action-adventure	Tequila Works		November 19, 2019	November 19, 2019	February 1, 2020	January 1, 2021	
Heist Simulator	Simulation	Petoons Studio	Outright Games	October 29, 2021	October 19, 2021			
Hello Engineer (§)		tinyBuild		October 26, 2021	June 22, 2021	October 1, 2021	January 1, 2022	
Hello Neighbor	Stealth, Survival horror	tinyBuild		September 1, 2020	December 8, 2017	September 1, 2020	December 1, 2020	
Hello Neighbor: Hide & Seek	Stealth, Survival horror	tinyBuild		November 1, 2020	December 7, 2018	November 1, 2020	February 1, 2021	
Hellpoint	Action role-playing	Cradle Games	tinyBuild	February 25, 2021	July 30, 2020			
Hitman	Stealth	IO Interactive		September 1, 2020	October 31, 2016	September 1, 2020		
Hitman 2	Stealth	IO Interactive		September 1, 2020	November 13, 2018	December 1, 2020	February 1, 2021	
Hitman 3	Stealth	IO Interactive		January 20, 2021	January 20, 2021			
Hotline Miami	Top-down shooter	Devolver Digital		September 22, 2020	June 25, 2013	January 1, 2021	April 1, 2021	
Hotline Miami 2: Wrong Number	Top-down shooter	Devolver Digital		September 22, 2020	March 10, 2015	May 1, 2021	August 1, 2021	
House of the Dead: Remake	Rail shooter	Forever Entertainment		April 28, 2022	April 7, 2022			
Human: Fall Flat	Puzzle-platform	No Brakes Games	Curve Digital	October 1, 2020	July 22, 2016	October 1, 2020	October 1, 2021	
Humankind	4X	Amplitude Studios	Sega	August 17, 2021	August 17, 2021			
Hundred Days - Winemaking Simulator	Simulation	Broken Arms Games		May 13, 2021	May 13, 2021	November 1, 2021		
Hunting Simulator 2	Simulation	Neopica	Nacon	November 30, 2021	June 16, 2017			
Ice Age: Scrat’s Nutty Adventure	Adventure, Platform	Just Add Water	Outright Games	August 13, 2021	October 16, 2019			
Immortals: Fenyx Rising	Action-adventure	Ubisoft Quebec	Ubisoft	December 3, 2020	December 3, 2020			
Into the Breach	Turn-based strategy	Subset Games		December 1, 2020	February 27, 2018	December 1, 2020	February 1, 2021	
It came from space and ate our brains	Top-down shooter	Triangle Studios		March 2, 2021	October 31, 2013	August 1, 2021		
Jotun: Valhalla Edition	Action-adventure	Thunder Lotus Games		May 26, 2020	September 29, 2015	October 1, 2020	January 1, 2021	
Journey to the Savage Planet	Adventure	Typhoon Studios	505 Games	February 1, 2021	January 29, 2020	February 1, 2021		
Judgment	Action-adventure	Ryu Ga Gotoku Studio	Sega	April 23, 2021	December 13, 2018			
Just Dance 2020	Rhythm	Ubisoft Paris	Ubisoft	November 19, 2019	November 5, 2019			
Just Dance 2021	Rhythm	Ubisoft Paris	Ubisoft	November 12, 2020	November 12, 2020			
Just Dance 2022	Rhythm	Ubisoft Paris	Ubisoft	November 4, 2021	November 4, 2021			
Just Shapes & Beats	Shoot 'em up, Rhythm	Berzerk Studio		June 30, 2020	May 31, 2018	August 1, 2020	November 1, 2020	
Katamari Damacy Reroll	Puzzle-platform	Namco		September 7, 2021	September 21, 2004			
Kaze and the Wild Masks	Platform	PixelHive, SOEDESCO Studios	SOEDESCO	March 25, 2021	March 25, 2021	May 1, 2022		
Kemono Heroes	Action-adventure	Mad Gear Games	NIS America	April 1, 2021	February 27, 2020	November 1, 2021	May 1, 2022	
Killer Queen Black	Platform	Liquid Bit, LLC, BumbleBear Games	Liquid Bit, LLC	March 30, 2021	October 11, 2019	August 1, 2021		
Kine	Puzzle	Gwen Frey		November 19, 2019	October 17, 2019	December 1, 2020	March 1, 2021	
Kona	Adventure	Parabole	Koch Media	August 1, 2020	March 17, 2017	August 1, 2020	September 1, 2020	
Lake	Adventure	Gamious	Whitehorn Games	June 1, 2022	September 1, 2021	June 1, 2022		
Lara Croft and the Guardian of Light	Action-adventure	Nixxes	Square Enix	December 22, 2020	August 18, 2010	February 1, 2021	May 1, 2021	
Lara Croft and the Temple of Osiris	Action-adventure	Nixxes	Square Enix	July 15, 2020	December 9, 2014	October 1, 2020	January 1, 2021	
Legend of Heroes: Trails of Cold Steel III	Role-playing	Nihon Falcom Corporation	NIS America	April 1, 2021	September 28, 2017	June 1, 2021		
Legend of Heroes: Trails of Cold Steel IV	Role-playing	Nihon Falcom Corporation	NIS America	April 9, 2021	September 27, 2018			
Legend of Keepers: Career of a Dungeon Manager	Tower defense, Roguelike	Goblinz Studio	Goblinz Publishing	April 29, 2021	April 29, 2021	September 1, 2021		
Life Is Strange Remastered	Adventure	Deck Nine	Square Enix	February 1, 2022	February 1, 2022	February 1, 2022	May 1, 2022	
Life Is Strange: Before the Storm Remastered	Adventure	Deck Nine	Square Enix	February 1, 2022	February 1, 2022	February 1, 2022	May 1, 2022	
Life Is Strange: True Colors	Adventure	Deck Nine	Square Enix	September 9, 2021	September 9, 2021			
Little Big Workshop	Simulation	Massive Miniteam	HandyGames	November 5, 2020	October 17, 2019	September 1, 2021	March 1, 2022	
Little Nightmares	Puzzle-platform	Tarsier Studios	Bandai Namco Entertainment	June 1, 2020	April 28, 2017	June 1, 2020	December 1, 2020	
Little Nightmares II	Puzzle-platform	Tarsier Studios, Supermassive Games	Bandai Namco Entertainment	February 10, 2021	February 10, 2021	February 10, 2021	August 12, 2021	
Lost Words: Beyond the Page	Platform	Sketchbook Games, Fourth State	Modus Games	March 27, 2020	March 27, 2020			
Lumote: The Mastermote Chronicles	Platform	Luminawesome Games	Wired Productions	May 1, 2022	March 24, 2020	May 1, 2022		
Mad Streets	Party	Craftshop Arts Inc		March 15, 2022	June 16, 2020			
Madden NFL 21	Sports simulation	EA Tiburon	Electronic Arts	January 28, 2021	August 28, 2020			
Madden NFL 22	Sports simulation	EA Tiburon	Electronic Arts	August 20, 2021	August 20, 2021			
Marvel's Avengers	Action-adventure	Crystal Dynamics, Eidos Interactive, Nixxes	Square Enix	September 1, 2020	September 1, 2020			
Mafia III Remastered	Action-adventure	Hangar 13	2K Games	October 1, 2021	October 7, 2016	October 1, 2021	January 1, 2022	
Merek's Market	Business simulation	Big Village Games		September 14, 2021	September 14, 2021	February 1, 2022		
Metro 2033 Redux	First-person shooter	4A Games	Deep Silver	June 23, 2020	August 26, 2014	August 1, 2020	October 1, 2020	
Metro Exodus	First-person shooter	4A Games	Deep Silver	November 19, 2019	February 15, 2019	February 1, 2020	April 1, 2020	
Metro: Last Light Redux	First-person shooter	4A Games	Deep Silver	June 23, 2020	August 26, 2014	September 1, 2020	November 1, 2020	
Monopoly	Board game	Engine Software	Ubisoft	April 28, 2020	November 25, 2014			
Monopoly Madness	Party	Engine Software	Ubisoft	December 9, 2021	December 9, 2021			
Monster Boy and the Cursed Kingdom	Platform	Game Atelier, FDG Entertainment	FDG Entertainment	July 1, 2020	December 4, 2018	July 1, 2020	October 1, 2020	
Monster Energy Supercross: The Official Videogame 3	Racing	Milestone srl		February 4, 2020	February 4, 2020			
Monster Energy Supercross: The Official Videogame 4	Racing	Milestone srl		March 11, 2021	March 11, 2021			
Monster Jam Steel Titans	Racing	Rainbow Studios	THQ Nordic	December 1, 2020	June 25, 2019	December 1, 2020	March 1, 2021	
Monster Jam Steel Titans 2	Racing	Rainbow Studios	THQ Nordic	March 2, 2021	March 2, 2021			
Moonlighter	action RPG	Digital Sun	11 Bit Studios	July 1, 2021	May 29, 2018	July 1, 2021		
Mortal Kombat 11	Fighting	NetherRealm Studios	Warner Bros. Interactive Entertainment	November 19, 2019	April 23, 2019			
MotoGP 20	Racing	Milestone srl		April 23, 2020	April 23, 2020	June 1, 2021	February 1, 2022	
MotoGP 21	Racing	Milestone srl		February 1, 2022	April 22, 2021			
Murder by Numbers	Visual novel, Puzzle	Mediatonic	The Irregular Corporation	March 23, 2021	March 5, 2020			
My Friend Peppa Pig	Adventure	Petoons Studio	Outright Games	October 22, 2021	October 22, 2021			
My Hero: One's Justice 2	Fighting	BYKING	Bandai Namco	February 15, 2022	March 12, 2020			
Nanotale - Typing Chronicles	Adventure RPG	Fishing Cactus		March 31, 2021	March 31, 2021	February 1, 2022		
NBA 2K20	Sports	Visual Concepts	2K	November 19, 2019	September 6, 2019			
NBA 2K21	Sports	Visual Concepts	2K	September 4, 2020	September 4, 2020			
Nine to Five	Tactical shooter	Redhill Games		December 8, 2021	August 26, 2021			
Octopath Traveler	Role-playing	Square Enix		April 28, 2020	July 13, 2018			
OddBallers	Party	Game Swing		March 24, 2022	March 24, 2022			
Olympic Games Tokyo 2020 - The Official Video Game	Sports	Sega		June 22, 2021	July 24, 2019			
One Hand Clapping	Adventure, Rhythm, Puzzle	HandyGames		December 14, 2021	December 14, 2021	February 1, 2022		
One Piece World Seeker	Action role-playing	Ganbarion	Bandai Namco	July 20, 2021	March 15, 2019			
Orcs Must Die! 3	Third-person shooter, Tower defense	Robot Entertainment	Stadia Games and Entertainment	July 14, 2020	July 14, 2020	July 14, 2020	July 14, 2021	
Outcasters (§)	Third-person shooter, Battle royale	Splash Damage	Stadia Games and Entertainment	December 3, 2020	December 3, 2020	December 3, 2020	March 3, 2021	
Outriders	Third-person shooter	People Can Fly	Square Enix	April 1, 2021	April 1, 2021	May 1, 2022		
Outward	Action role-playing	Nine Dots Studio	Koch Media	November 30, 2020	March 26, 2019			
Overcooked! All You Can Eat	Simulation	Ghost Town Games	Team17	May 5, 2022	November 12, 2020			
Pac-Man Mega Tunnel Battle (§)	Battle royale	Heavy Iron Studios	Bandai Namco	November 17, 2020	November 17, 2020	March 1, 2021	June 1, 2021	
Panzer Dragoon	Rail shooter	MegaPixel Studio	Forever Entertainment	June 1, 2020	March 26, 2020	June 1, 2020	February 1, 2021	
PAW Patrol Mighty Pups: Save Adventure Bay	Adventure	Drakhar Studio	Outright Games	August 13, 2021	November 6, 2020	August 13, 2021		
PAW Patrol the Movie: Adventure City Calls	Adventure	Drakhar Studio	Outright Games	August 13, 2021	August 13, 2021	May 1, 2022		
PGA Tour 2K21	Sports simulation	HB Studios	2K	August 21, 2020	August 21, 2020	September 8, 2021	January 1, 2022	
Phoenix Point	Strategy, turn-based tactics	Snapshot Games		January 26, 2021	December 3, 2019			
Phogs!	Puzzle-platform	Bit Loom Games	Coatsink	December 3, 2020	December 3, 2020	February 1, 2022		
Pikuniku	Puzzle Adventure	Sectordub	Devolver Digital	February 9, 2021	January 24, 2019	April 1, 2021	July 1, 2021	
PixelJunk Raiders (§)	Action	Q-Games		March 1, 2021	March 1, 2021	March 1, 2021		
PJ Masks: Heroes of the Night	Platform	Petoons Studio	Outright Games	October 29, 2021	October 29, 2021			
PlayerUnknown's Battlegrounds	Battle royale	PUBG Corporation		April 28, 2020	December 20, 2017	April 28, 2020	August 1, 2021	
Power Rangers: Battle for the Grid	Fighting	nWay Games	Lionsgate Games	June 1, 2020	March 26, 2019	June 1, 2020	December 1, 2020	
Race with Ryan Road Trip	Racing	3DClouds	Outright Games	March 1, 2022	October 30, 2019	March 1, 2022		
Rage 2	First-person shooter	Avalanche Studios, id Software	Bethesda Softworks	November 19, 2019	May 14, 2019			
Rayman Legends	Platform	Ubisoft Montpellier	Ubisoft	November 23, 2021	September 3, 2013			
Red Dead Redemption 2	Action-adventure	Rockstar Studios	Rockstar Games	November 19, 2019	October 26, 2018			
Reigns	Strategy	Nerial	Devolver Digital	December 22, 2020	August 11, 2016	March 1, 2021	June 1, 2021	
Relicta	Puzzle	Mighty Polygon	Koch Media	August 4, 2020	August 4, 2020			
République	Stealth	Camouflaj	NIS America	September 15, 2020	March 22, 2016	November 1, 2020		
Resident Evil 7: Biohazard	Survival horror	Capcom		April 1, 2021	January 24, 2017	April 1, 2021	July 1, 2021	
Resident Evil Village	Survival horror	Capcom		May 7, 2021	May 7, 2021			
Riders Republic	Sports MMO	Ubisoft Annecy	Ubisoft	October 28, 2021	October 28, 2021			
Rise of the Tomb Raider	Action-adventure	Crystal Dynamics	Square Enix	November 19, 2019	November 10, 2015	January 1, 2020	February 1, 2020	
Risk of Rain 2	Roguelike, Third-person shooter	Hopoo Games	Gearbox Publishing	September 29, 2020	August 11, 2020	November 1, 2020	January 1, 2021	
Rock of Ages III: Make And Break	Tower defense, Racing	ACE Team, Giant Monkey Robot	Modus Games	August 14, 2020	July 21, 2020	August 14, 2020	January 1, 2021	
Ryan's Rescue Squad	Adventure	Stage Clear Studios	Outright Games	March 8, 2022	March 4, 2022			
Saints Row IV: Re-Elected	action-adventure game	Volition	Deep Silver	November 1, 2021	August 20, 2013	November 1, 2021		
Saints Row: The Third Remastered	action-adventure game	Volition, Fishlabs	Koch Media	March 5, 2021	May 22, 2020			
Samurai Shodown	Fighting	SNK	Athlon Games	November 19, 2019	June 25, 2019	November 19, 2019	February 1, 2020	
Scott Pilgrim vs. The World: The Game - Complete Edition	Beat 'em up	Ubisoft Montreal	Ubisoft	January 14, 2021	January 14, 2021			
Secret Neighbor	Stealth, Survival horror	Hologryph	tinyBuild	December 1, 2020	October 24, 2019	December 1, 2020	March 1, 2021	
Sekiro: Shadows Die Twice	Action-adventure	FromSoftware	Activision	October 28, 2020	March 22, 2019			
Serious Sam Collection	Shooter	Croteam	Devolver Digital	March 3, 2020	March 3, 2020	April 1, 2020	July 1, 2020	
Serious Sam 4	Shooter	Croteam	Devolver Digital	September 24, 2020	September 24, 2020			
Shadow of the Tomb Raider	Action-adventure	Eidos Montréal	Square Enix	November 19, 2019	September 14, 2018			
Shantae: Half-Genie Hero	Platform, Metroidvania	WayForward		February 23, 2021	December 20, 2016			
Shantae: Risky's Revenge	Platform, Metroidvania	WayForward		February 23, 2021	October 4, 2010	January 1, 2022		
Sniper Elite 4	Tactical shooter Stealth	Rebellion Developments		November 1, 2020	February 17, 2017	November 1, 2020	February 1, 2021	
Spiritfarer	Simulation, Adventure	Thunder Lotus Games		August 21, 2020	August 18, 2020			
Spitlings	Arcade	Massive Miniteam	HandyGames	February 25, 2020	February 25, 2020	April 1, 2020	July 1, 2020	
SpongeBob SquarePants: Battle for Bikini Bottom – Rehydrated	Platform game	Purple Lamp Studios	THQ Nordic	December 8, 2020	June 23, 2020	April 1, 2021	July 1, 2021	
Stacks On Stacks (On Stacks)	Puzzle	Herringbone Games		April 1, 2020	April 1, 2020	April 1, 2020	July 1, 2020	
Star Wars Jedi: Fallen Order	Action-adventure	Respawn Entertainment	Electronic Arts	November 24, 2020	November 15, 2019	May 4, 2021	June 4, 2021	
SteamWorld Dig	Action-adventure	Image & Form	Image & Form	March 10, 2020	August 7, 2013	July 1, 2020	July 1, 2021	
SteamWorld Dig 2	Action-adventure	Image & Form	Image & Form	March 1, 2020	September 21, 2017	March 1, 2020	April 1, 2021	
SteamWorld Heist	Turn-based strategy	Image & Form	Image & Form	March 10, 2020	December 10, 2015	May 1, 2020	May 1, 2021	
SteamWorld Quest	Role-playing	Image & Form	Thunderful Publishing	March 1, 2020	April 25, 2019	March 1, 2020	April 1, 2021	
Strange Brigade	Third-person shooter	Rebellion Developments		August 1, 2020	August 28, 2018	August 1, 2020	November 1, 2020	
Street Power Football	Sports	SFL Interactive, Gamajun	Maximum Games	May 11, 2021	August 25, 2020	July 1, 2021	January 1, 2022	
Streets of Rage 4	beat 'em up game	Dotemu		July 15, 2021	April 30, 2020			
Submerged: Hidden Depths	Adventure	Uppercut Games	Stadia Games and Entertainment	December 3, 2020	December 3, 2020	December 3, 2020	June 4, 2021	
Sundered	Metroidvania	Thunder Lotus Games		May 26, 2020	July 28, 2017	November 1, 2020	January 25, 2021	
Super Animal Royale	Battle Royale	Pixile	Modus Games	December 14, 2021	August 26, 2021			
Super Bomberman R Online	Battle Royale, Maze	Konami		September 1, 2020	September 1, 2020	September 1, 2020	December 1, 2020	
Superhot	First-person shooter	Superhot Team		June 1, 2020	February 26, 2016	June 1, 2020	December 1, 2020	
Superhot: Mind Control Delete	First-person shooter	Superhot Team		August 18, 2020	July 16, 2020	October 1, 2020	April 1, 2021	
Terraria	Action-adventure	Re-Logic	505 Games	March 18, 2021	May 16, 2011	July 1, 2021		
The Addams Family: Mansion Mayhem	Adventure, Platform	PHL Collective	Outright Games	October 1, 2021	September 24, 2021			
The Crew 2	Racing	Ivory Tower	Ubisoft	March 25, 2020	June 29, 2018			
The Darkside Detective	Adventure	Spooky Doorway	Akupara Games	April 8, 2021	July 27, 2017	July 1, 2021		
The Darkside Detective: A Fumble in the Dark	Adventure	Spooky Doorway	Akupara Games	April 15, 2021	April 15, 2021	January 1, 2022		
The Elder Scrolls Online	MMORPG	ZeniMax Online Studios	Bethesda Softworks	June 16, 2020	April 4, 2014	June 16, 2020	July 16, 2020	
The Falconeer	aerial combat	Tomas Sala	Wired Productions	October 5, 2021	November 10, 2020			
The Gardens Between	Puzzle game	The Voxel Agents		November 1, 2020	September 20, 2018	November 1, 2020	February 1, 2021	
The Jackbox Party Pack 6	Party	Jackbox Games		December 21, 2021	October 17, 2019			
The Jackbox Party Pack 7	Party	Jackbox Games		December 7, 2021	October 15, 2020			
The Jackbox Party Pack 8	Party	Jackbox Games		November 16, 2021	October 14, 2021			
The Turing Test	Puzzle	Bulkhead Interactive		May 1, 2020	August 30, 2016	May 1, 2020	October 1, 2020	
Thumper	Rhythm	Drool		November 19, 2019	October 10, 2016	January 1, 2020	May 1, 2020	
TOHU	Adventure	Fireart Games	The Irregular Corporation	January 28, 2021	January 28, 2021			
Tom Clancy's The Division 2	Third-person shooter	Massive Entertainment	Ubisoft	March 17, 2020	March 15, 2019			
Tom Clancy's Ghost Recon Breakpoint	Tactical shooter	Ubisoft Paris	Ubisoft	December 18, 2019	October 4, 2019			
Tom Clancy's Ghost Recon Wildlands	Tactical shooter	Ubisoft Paris	Ubisoft	November 19, 2020	March 7, 2017			
Tom Clancy's Rainbow Six Extraction	Tactical shooter	Ubisoft Montreal	Ubisoft	January 20, 2022	January 20, 2022			
Tom Clancy's Rainbow Six Siege	Tactical shooter	Ubisoft Montreal	Ubisoft	June 30, 2021	December 1, 2015			
Tomb Raider	Action-adventure	Crystal Dynamics	Square Enix	November 19, 2019	March 5, 2013	December 1, 2019	January 1, 2020	
Transformers: Battlegrounds	Strategy	Coatsink	Outright Games	December 1, 2021	October 23, 2020	December 1, 2021		
Trials Rising	Racing	RedLynx, Ubisoft Kyiv	Ubisoft	November 19, 2019	February 26, 2019			
Trine 4: The Nightmare Prince	Puzzle-platform	Frozenbyte	Modus Games	March 30, 2021	October 8, 2019	May 1, 2021	May 1, 2022	
Trivial Pursuit Live! 2	Party	Longtail Studios	Ubisoft	March 17, 2022	March 17, 2022			
Trollhunters: Defenders of Arcadia	Action, Platform	WayForward	Outright Games	January 25, 2022	September 25, 2020			
Uno	Card Game	Ubisoft Chengdu	Ubisoft	September 15, 2020	August 16, 2016			
Uno: 50th Anniversary	Card Game		Ubisoft	June 3, 2021	June 3, 2021			
Unto the End	Platform	2 Ton Studios	Big Sugar	December 9, 2020	December 9, 2020	December 10, 2021		
Valkyria Chronicles 4	Tactical role-playing game	Sega		December 8, 2020	March 21, 2018	August 1, 2021	November 1, 2021	
Watch Dogs	Action-adventure	Ubisoft Montreal	Ubisoft	December 9, 2020	May 27, 2014			
Watch Dogs 2	Action-adventure	Ubisoft Montreal	Ubisoft	December 9, 2020	November 15, 2016			
Watch Dogs: Legion	Action-adventure	Ubisoft Toronto	Ubisoft	October 29, 2020	October 29, 2020			
Wave Break	Sports simulation	Funktronic Labs		June 23, 2020	June 23, 2020	September 1, 2021		
Wavetale	Adventure, Platform	Thunderful Publishing		November 10, 2021	November 10, 2021	November 10, 2021		
Welcome to Elk	Adventure	Triple Topping		February 23, 2021	September 17, 2020			
West of Loathing	Adventure, Role-playing	Asymmetric Productions		July 1, 2020	August 10, 2017	July 1, 2020	November 1, 2020	
Windbound	Survival	5 Lives Studios	Koch Media	August 28, 2020	August 28, 2020			
Windjammers 2	Sports	Dotemu		January 20, 2022	January 20, 2022			
Wolfenstein: Youngblood	First-person shooter	MachineGames, Arkane Studios	Bethesda Softworks	November 19, 2019	July 26, 2019			
World War Z: Aftermath	Third-person shooter, Action-adventure	Saber Interactive Inc		April 5, 2022	September 21, 2021	April 5, 2022		
Worm Game (§)	Arcade	Stadia Platform Content		January 13, 2023				
Worms W.M.D	Artillery, strategy	Team17		July 1, 2022	August 23, 2016	July 1, 2022		
Wreckfest	Vehicular combat, racing	Bugbear Entertainment	THQ Nordic	December 1, 2021	June 14, 2018	December 1, 2021		
WWE 2K Battlegrounds	Sports	Saber Interactive	2K	September 18, 2020	September 18, 2020			
Young Souls	Role-playing	1P2P	The Arcade Crew	August 17, 2021	August 17, 2021			
Ys IX: Monstrum Nox	Action role-playing	Nihon Falcom Corporation	NIS America	July 6, 2021	September 26, 2019	April 1, 2022		
Ys VIII: Lacrimosa of Dana	Action role-playing	Nihon Falcom Corporation	NIS America	April 1, 2021	July 21, 2016	April 1, 2021	April 1, 2022	
Zombie Army 4: Dead War	Tactical shooter, Survival horror	Rebellion Developments		May 1, 2020	February 4, 2020	May 1, 2020	August 1, 2020	
Zorro: The Chronicles	Action-adventure	Bkom Studios	BTC Studios	June 16, 2022	June 16, 2022			
