= SteamWorld Build =

2023 video game

- Developer: The Station
- Publisher: Thunderful Publishing
- Director: Andreas Persson
- Producer: Adam Vassée
- Artist: Sofie Wikström
- Composer: Ola Bäckström
- Series: SteamWorld
- Engine: Unity
- Platforms: Windows; Nintendo Switch; PlayStation 4; PlayStation 5; Xbox One; Xbox Series X/S
- Release: December 1, 2023
- Genres: City-building, dungeon crawling
- Mode: Single-player

SteamWorld Build is a city-building dungeon crawling video game developed by The Station and published by Thunderful Publishing. An installment in the SteamWorld series, the game was released for Windows, Nintendo Switch, PlayStation 4, PlayStation 5, Xbox One, Xbox Series X and Series S in December 2023. The game received generally positive reviews upon release.

== Gameplay ==
In SteamWorld Build, players must manage a mining town on an alien planet.

SteamWorld Build is a cross-genre video game. The first part of the game tasks the players to construct and manage a mining town on an alien planet. Players need to construct roads, infrastructure, amenities, and houses for their population. Players need to satisfy the needs of the town's residents and maintain their happiness ratings. As the player progresses, they will be able to unlock new buildings and technologies, as well as upgrading their workforce. The town's progress is measured via milestones, which is determined by the town's overall population, with each inhabitant assigned to one of four different categories, which are gradually unlocked as the milestones are cleared: Workers for unskilled labor; Engineers for working on heavy machinery; Aristobots who establish various kinds of industry; and Scientists who focus on researching and developing new technologies.

Once the player has sufficient materials to repair their mining shaft, the second part of the game would be unlocked. In addition to building a functioning mine, players must recruit workers to explore an old abandoned mine to look for an ancient technology that may help the player to escape the planet. In the process, they must also collect ores and other resources which can be used for the expansion of the town. A larger town will attract more engineers, allowing players to recruit more miners and expand the town's mining capabilities. The underground workers are divided into four groups: Miners, who open tunnels along the mine; Prospectors, who carry resources back to the surface; Mechanics, who can build and repair all sorts of machinery, including other bots; and Guards, who fight monsters and other dangers lurking in the mine.

== Plot ==
Set during the events of SteamWorld Dig 2, with the planet's destruction imminent, Jack Clutchsprocket arrives at an abandoned mine along his daughter Astrid and a group of refugees. They are guided by the mysterious bot "Core", who told them that inside the mine are the materials they need to assemble a rocket they can use to escape the planet. Just after settling their base, they are approached by an old, battered bot called "Trader", who assists them in their mission.

As they gather parts to build the rocket, Astrid is contacted by the Ancient Signal that controls the machinery there, warning her about an imminent danger, when the rocket is completed, Core reveals himself as part of the Vectron Hivemind, who deceived the bots into build the rocket so they can escape the planet. Pursued by the Vectron machines, Trader stays behind, sacrificing himself to allow the others to escape the planet. Once in space, the bots depart to look for a new home to settle, unaware that the Vectron Hivemind has infiltrated their systems.

== Development ==
SteamWorld Build was developed by a team of 40 people in The Station, a studio owned by Thunderful Development, with franchise director Brjánn Sigurgeirsson overseeing its development. Build is the first SteamWorld game not developed by the original team in Sweden. The Station was previously known for developing art and assets for LittleBigPlanet games. Development of the game began in early 2020. Developers compared the game to the Anno series by Ubisoft and the Dungeon Keeper series from Bullfrog Productions, though the team strived to ensure that the game's two styles of gameplay are not independent of each other. The story of the game runs parallel to that of SteamWorld Dig 2 and features both new and returning characters from previous SteamWorld games. When asked why the studio decided to make a city-building game, director Andreas Persson commented that SteamWorld was a franchise that "lends itself to experimentation". He explained that the design goal was to combine the series' familiar mining mechanics with previously unexplored gameplay concepts to create something "unique". Both the city-building and mining gameplay were designed to be accessible to cater to players who enjoy the setting but are otherwise unfamiliar with management games.

In May 2022, Thunderful Development announced that they were working on four different SteamWorld games, with one of them being a city-building game codenamed "Coffee". The game was first announced in January 2023 by Thunderful as part of its "SteamWorld Telegraph" presentation. A free demo of the game was released on the same day. SteamWorld Build was released for Windows PC, Nintendo Switch, PlayStation 4, PlayStation 5, Xbox One, Xbox Series X and Series S on December 1, 2023. A downloadable content pack titled "Mechanized" was released on April 4, 2024. It introduces a fifth type of worker, the Mech, whose exclusive abilities can be applied to both exploration and combat.

== Reception ==
Reception

Aggregate score
Aggregator	Score
Metacritic	(PC) 74/100 (PS5) 82/100 (Switch) 77/100 (XSX) 79/100

Review scores
Publication	Score
Game Informer	7/10
GamesRadar+	4/5
IGN	7/10
PC Gamer (US)	69/100
Shacknews	9/10

According to review aggregator Metacritic, the PC and the Switch versions of the game received "mixed or average" reviews while the Switch, PS5 and Xbox Series X/S versions received "generally favourable" reviews.

TJ Denzer from Shacknews praised the game's complexity, writing that "what begins as a pretty typical city builder, quickly becomes multi-faceted management of a city of robots above and a mine that has the resources they need beneath". He particularly enjoyed how the game remixed core concepts of the SteamWorld series, recommending the game to both fans of the series and players who enjoyed playing city-building games. Sam Loveridge from GamesRadar+ praised the game for its accessibility, remarking that the game is suitable for players who are new to the genre, though "there's enough complexity that it still works for someone more au fait with them". He also praised the dungeon crawling aspect of the game for adding additional layers for management and making the game "more satisfying".

Writing for Game Informer, Kenneth Seward Jr. remarked that while fans will enjoy the callbacks to earlier entries, the overall story is "nearly nonexistent" and that the campaign "overstays its welcome". He nonetheless wrote that the game was an "entertaining" experience, praising its control scheme, tutorial systems, and accessibility. Several critics felt that the game did not have sufficient replay value. Robin Valentine from PC Gamer added that SteamWorld Build was "a charming and very chill way to get a quick city builder fix", but the overall experience felt "very slight in a genre full of heavier hitters". He added that there were "no real obstacles" in the game, and that there was "very little pressure" for players to succeed, as the game rarely punishes players for inefficient design.
