= SteamWorld Heist II =

2024 video game

- Developer: Thunderful Development
- Publisher: Thunderful
- Director: Brjann Sigurgeirsson
- Producer: Petter Magnusson
- Artist: Brandt Andrist
- Composer: Steam Powered Giraffe
- Series: SteamWorld
- Platforms: Microsoft Windows; Nintendo Switch; PlayStation 4; PlayStation 5; Xbox One; Xbox Series X/S
- Release: August 8, 2024
- Genre: Turn-based tactics
- Mode: Single-player

SteamWorld Heist II is a 2024 turn-based tactics shooter video game developed and published by Thunderful. As the seventh installment in the SteamWorld series and the sequel to SteamWorld Heist (2015), the game was released for Windows, Nintendo Switch, PlayStation 4, PlayStation 5, Xbox One, and Xbox Series X and Series S in August 2024.

== Gameplay ==
Similar to its predecessor, SteamWorld Heist II is a side-scrolling turn-based tactics video game. In the game, the player gathers a ragtag crew of Steambots as they venture into the ocean to uncover its source of poisoning. In each turn, each character has two action points, allowing them to shoot, move, or perform other abilities. Players have to strategically place characters in their party in tactical positions, such as hiding behind cover to boost their defense. When attacking, players controls the aiming of all firearms, and can bounce bullets and grenades off the environment for ricocheting trick shots. SteamWorld Heist II introduces the job system, enabling players to specialize their characters. Changing a character's equipped weapon will automatically change their job. There are six jobs available at launch, including the Reapers, a class which can shoot twice if the previous shot defeats an enemy, and the Boomers, a demolition expert specializing in the use of explosives. Some job skills will remain usable even if a character's job is changed subsequently, though they must be first unlocked through spending "cogs", a currency rewarded to players as they complete missions.

In between missions, players can now directly commandeer the submarine and explore the ocean overworld. The player's ship can be equipped with a large assortment of weapons, which will fire automatically at hostile enemies when they approach. As opposed to ground combat, naval combat occurs in real-time. In the overworld, players can access missions, collect scraps and resources, and visit taverns. By visiting taverns, players can purchase and upgrade a squad member's gears and abilities, recruit new characters, and let characters returning from missions rest. As players progress in the game, their reputation will increase, allowing them to upgrade their submarine to unlock previously inaccessible areas.

== Plot ==
=== Setting ===
As with other games in the SteamWorld series, the game is set on a far-future, post-apocalyptic Earth where humans devolved into subterranean beings known as "Shiners", and were replaced by their sentient robotic creations on the surface. The game is the last in the series chronologically, and, as with SteamWorld Heist, takes place after the destruction of Earth by a runaway fusion reaction at the end of Dig 2 and Build. The Earth has since split into "shards" that are still relied upon as a source of clean water to power Steambots, the least advanced form of robots. The Steambots are ruled over by the more advanced, but largely corrupt Dieselbots.

=== Story ===
Set a couple decades after the events of Steamworld Heist, the story begins in the tranquil area of Caribbea as pirate captain Quincy Leeway recovers his submarine from the Royal Navy, the ruling faction of Dieselbots that controls the Shard, with the help of two close comrades, Daisy Clutch and Wesley Hotchkiss. Leeway's crew has been stealing the ill-gotten gains of the Navy, who are oppressing the Steambots due to an ongoing water contamination crisis that has resulted in a "disease" called Rust. However, he is haunted by an inferiority complex due to the exploits of his mother, Krakenbane, a legendary monster hunter who left him the submarine, while he has accomplished little. After recovering the sub, Leeway begins trying to both solve the crisis and escape out of his mother's shadow.

Pinpointing the source of the toxic water as the far North, Leeway's crew recovers an air tank and takes a submerged smuggler's tunnel beneath the Navy's massive barrier into Arctica, a frozen area in the nick of time before the Navy can intercept them. There, they encounter a cult called the Rattlers, who have replaced their metal with bones in hopes of escaping the Rust and seek to force all bots to becomes like them. The Navy erected the barrier to contain the Rattlers. Meanwhile, a hunting trophy (named Trophy) kept by Krakenbane suddenly awakens as a sentient being. It appears friendly and kind, but has retrograde amnesia about its origins. Leeway's crew faces off against Morgan, the leader of the cult, and slays her, stealing the naval ram from her flagship and using it to enter the ice cap to the north.

There, Leeway discovers that the source of the toxin is the mechanical body of the Kraken, which his mother once defeated. Trophy is revealed to be the Kraken's brain core, detached by Krakenbane to deactivate the monster. Leeway is betrayed by one of his allies, the water researcher Dr. Bunsen, who is revealed to be a disguised agent of the Atomics, a race of deep-sea beings who seek misguided revenge on the Steambots for causing the Earth's destruction and devastating their hyper-advanced cities. The Atomics reattach Trophy to the Kraken, activating it causing the crazed beast to rampage, and tip off the Navy, causing Leeway's ship to be impounded and his crew to be imprisoned. In an act of sadistic spitte, Leeway gets marooned on a desert island instead of killed to try to break his spirit and force him to see the Kraken destroy everything he holds dear.

Despondent, Leeway contacts his mother using a communicator device, and she arrives from space, hoping he has changed his mind about leaving the Shard. However, Leeway refuses, desiring instead to rescue his crew and stop the Kraken to prevent the annihilation of the shard. His mother commends him, gifting him one of her arms to replace his missing one. Leeway proceeds to free the captured crew, and also discovers that Piper Faraday, protagonist of SteamWorld Heist, and her crewmate Fen, have been secretly helping him all along. He recovers enough fuel rods to augment his ship's boiler, allowing it to dive to the deep ocean and, with Faraday's guidance, find a group of peaceful Atomics. There it is revealed most Atomics are peaceful and it is the military that seeks the destruction of steambots, With their help, Leeway's crew confronts the villainous militant faction of the Atomics, the Reckoning, tearing down their defenses to be able to reach the fake Dr Bunsen and his brother, the Recknoning leaders.

After slaying the Reckoning's leaders, Leeway's crew recovers the Kraken Horn, a control device. Calling the Kraken, Leeway and his crew destroy its outer shell and enter its body to cripple its power system. Despite the Kraken incapacitating the crew, Leeway manages to destroy its heart, with Trophy's timely help. He successfully rescues Trophy and returns to the surface, the water crisis now over for good. The remaining Atomics come up to the surface to live alongside Steambots, some reformed Navy members help rebuild the damage caused by the Kraken and Piper and Fen leave with Krakenbane to space to fight evil. Now a renowned hero, Leeway returns to being a free-roaming pirate, while Trophy expresses a desire to gain a true robotic body before Leeway and his crew go in search of their next adventure.

== Development ==
SteamWorld Heist II was developed by Thunderful Development. Development of the game started in 2020. The team chose to make a sequel to SteamWorld Heist because there were a lot of features they had to cut during its development. As a result, the team significantly expanded systems for character customization in Heist II, and introduced the overworld system which was initially planned for the first game. The game was officially announced in April 2024 and was released for Windows PC, Nintendo Switch, PlayStation 4, PlayStation 5, Xbox One and Xbox Series X and Series S on August 8, 2024.

=== Soundtrack ===
The game's soundtrack, Music From SteamWorld Heist II, is composed and recorded by the band Steam Powered Giraffe, who also created the soundtrack for the original Steamworld Heist 9 years earlier. The band members appear as NPCs in different bars (such as Hardwater Bar & Guns and The Faucet) throughout the game while performing songs from the soundtrack. The members of the band also voiced their respective characters.

== Reception ==
Reception

Aggregate score
Aggregator	Score
Metacritic	(PC) 80/100 (Switch) 79/100 (PS5) 83/100 (XSX) 82/100

Review scores
Publication	Score
Eurogamer	3/5
GameSpot	9/10
IGN	8/10
PC Gamer (US)	81/100

The game received "generally favourable" reviews according to review aggregator Metacritic.

Steve Watts from GameSpot praised the game's unique gameplay and liked the flexible job system for experimenting players to experiment with different tactics and character builds. While he noted that many of the game's systems are complex, they "synergize incredibly well without feeling overwhelming". Dan Stapleton wrote that SteamWorld Heist II "takes place on a surprisingly large overworld map that’s packed with so many tough and tactically deep turn-based missions", and added that the experience took him about 40 hours to finish. He praised the refinement to the game's control scheme, and the handcrafted levels which are "built around using teamwork to accomplish their objectives and escape unscathed".

Writing for PC Gamer, Robin Valentine wrote that the strategic component in the game was "compelling" and "satisfying", and noted that the game significantly expanded on the original by introducing the new job system. However, he felt that the game was "in danger of outstaying its welcome" as it was nearly twice as long as the original game. In a more negative review, Katharine Castle from Eurogamer wrote that the core gameplay was still "eminently enjoyable", though its bigger scope and ambition meant that player progression became too slow and missions in late game "feel progressively less like a fun, cheeky outing to steal some treasure, and more like an openly hostile grind where you barely escape with your life".
