= SteamWorld Quest =

SteamWorld Quest: Hand of Gilgamech
- Developer: Image & Form
- Publisher: Thunderful Publishing
- Series: SteamWorld
- Platforms: Nintendo Switch; Windows; macOS; Linux; Stadia; Amazon Luna
- Release: Nintendo Switch; April 25, 2019; Windows, macOS, Linux; May 31, 2019; Stadia; March 3, 2020; Amazon Luna; October 20, 2020
- Genres: Role-playing, deck-building
- Mode: Single-player

SteamWorld Quest: Hand of Gilgamech is a turn-based role-playing game and deck-building game hybrid that is part of the SteamWorld series of video games. It was developed by Image & Form and published by Thunderful Publishing. The game was released for Nintendo Switch on April 25, 2019, for Windows, macOS, and Linux on May 31, 2019, for Stadia on March 3, 2020, and for Amazon Luna on October 20, 2020.

The game follows a team of sentient steam-powered humanoid robots as they travel across a steampunk fantasy world fighting evil. It received generally positive reviews, with critics citing the graphics and gameplay as strong points.

== Plot ==
SteamWorld Quest is presented as a fairy tale told within the otherwise science fiction universe of SteamWorld Heist and is not directly linked story-wise to the previous games. It follows Armilly and Copernica, two friends who set out on a journey that spirals into a much larger one.

== Gameplay ==
SteamWorld Quest is a side-scrolling video game and is separated into small explorable areas that the player is encouraged to loot for treasure. The player may encounter enemies and become engaged in battle. Attacks are performed by collecting punch cards that the robots can use to execute programs. The game uses role-playing game elements, with steam pressure representing mana. The player must build their own deck of attacks using character-specific cards.

== Reception ==
Reception

Aggregate score
Aggregator	Score
Metacritic	NS: 81/100

Review scores
Publication	Score
Destructoid	8/10
Edge	9/10
Game Informer	8/10
IGN	8.6/10
Nintendo Life	8/10
Nintendo World Report	9/10
TouchArcade	4.5/5
USgamer	4/5

SteamWorld Quest received an aggregate score of 81 on Metacritic. Matt Masem of RPGamer rated the game 4.5/5, calling it an "excellent adventure" with "beautiful" animation, and calling the story "wonderfully executed" despite being "standard RPG fare". Tom Marks of IGN gave the game 8.6/10, saying the combat system offers an "insane amount of choice". Nadia Oxford of USgamer rated the game 4/5, criticizing the game as "light on character and worldbuilding" but calling it a "fun, airy RPG".
