= Steam Powered Giraffe =

American musical comedy project

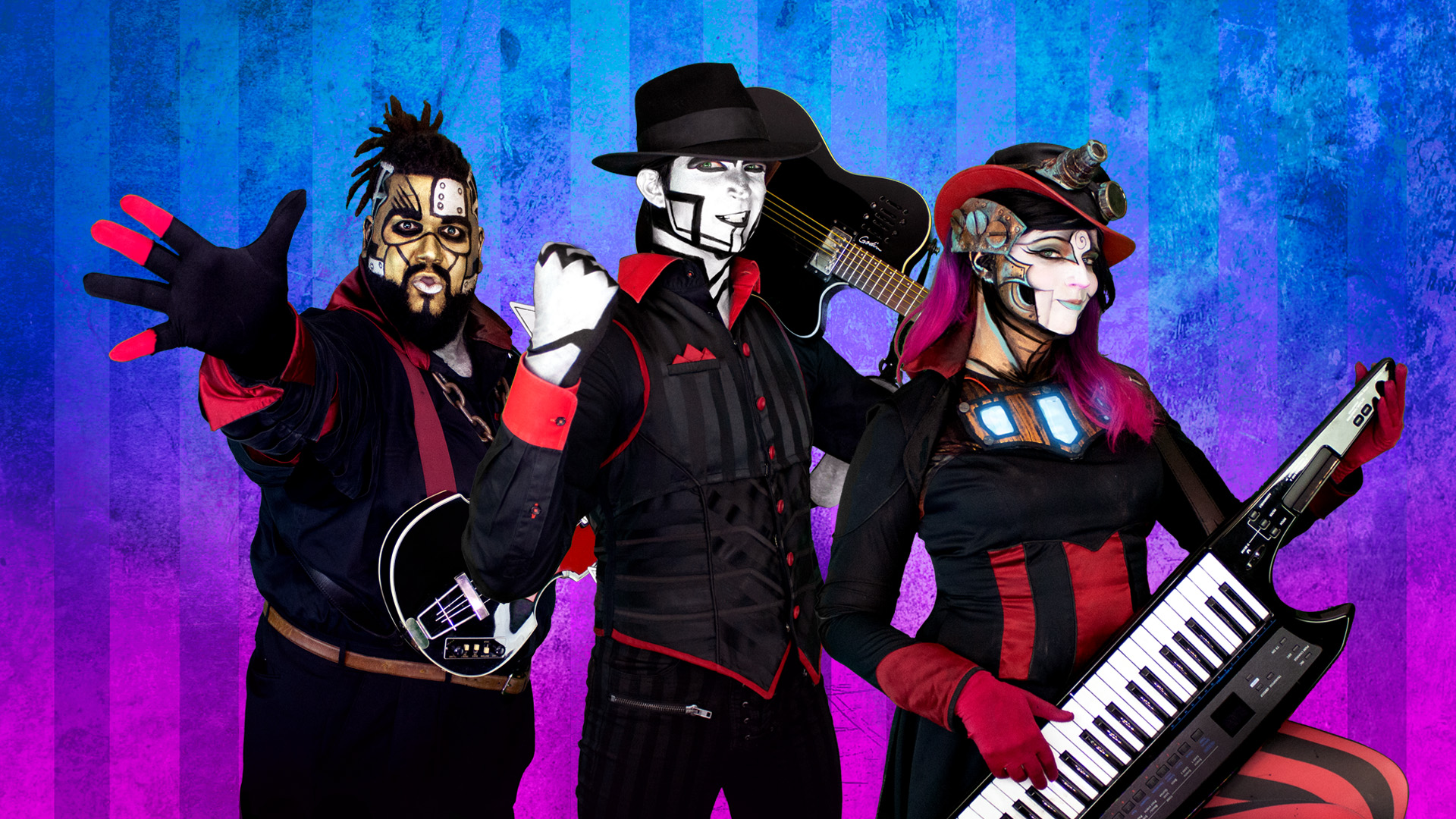
- From left to right: Zer0, The Spine, Rabbit, c. 2018

Background information
- Origin: San Diego, California, United States
- Genres: Folk rock; pop; vaudeville; comedy
- Years active: 2008–present
- Label: Independent
- Members: David Michael Bennett; Bryan Barbarin; Eliana Payne; Chelsea Penyak; Camille Penyak; Lacey Johnson; Astrud Aurelia
- Past members: Isabella Bunny Bennett; Erin Burke; Jon Sprague; Sam Luke; Michael Philip Reed; Matthew Elton Smith; Steve Negrete; David Butterfield
- Website: www.steampoweredgiraffe.com

Steam Powered Giraffe is an American musical project formed in San Diego, California in 2008, self-described as "a musical act that combines robot pantomime, puppetry, ballet, comedy, projections, and music". Created by twins David Michael Bennett and Isabella Bunny Bennett, the act combines music and improvisational comedy on-stage, with their studio works focusing primarily on music.

Steam Powered Giraffe (sometimes abbreviated as "SPG") has its own fictional mythology, in which the characters portrayed on-stage and on-record are a troupe of robot musicians constructed in the late 1890s. This fictional universe, influenced by the steampunk subculture, has been explored and expanded upon in the band's albums, on-stage performances, on official web pages, and via comics primarily written and drawn by Isabella Bennett. The band has undergone several line-up changes, but its primary focus is on a core cast of robot characters portrayed through makeup and pantomime. Several “human” performers have assisted with music, comedy, and dance throughout the act's history, and additional characters have been portrayed using puppetry, voice acting, and on-screen visuals.

Since its conception, the band has performed at venues including the San Diego Zoo, Legoland California, Downtown Disney, and numerous science fiction, fantasy, anime, and steampunk conventions. As of November 2025, the group has released six studio albums, four live albums, several live concert videos, webcomics, and two podcast series. Their work has also been used in video games, with the group providing the soundtracks for the 2015 video game SteamWorld Heist and its 2024 sequel, as well as an official single for the 2016 video game Battleborn.

== Career ==
=== 2008-2011: Formation and early career ===
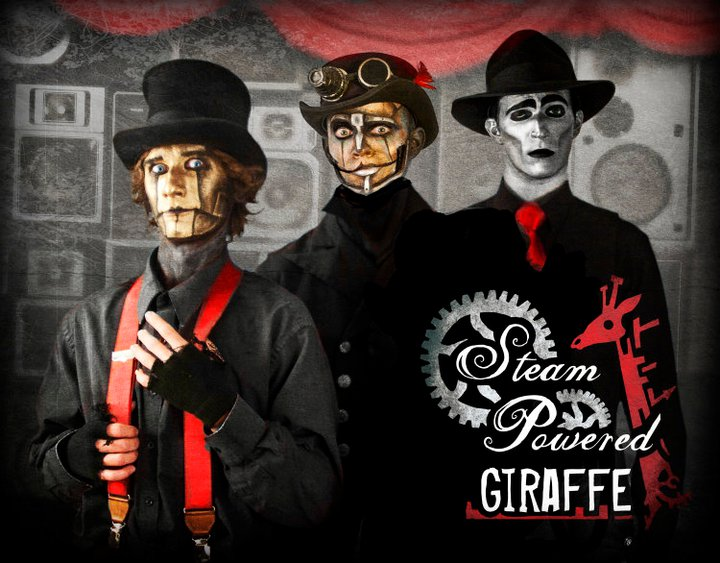
The Jon, Rabbit, and The Spine in 2011

Several of the members of Steam Powered Giraffe met while attending Theatre Arts courses at Grossmont College in El Cajon, California, particularly the pantomime classes of Professor Jerry Hager (26-year Seaport Village mime "Kazoo"). The original four performers—twins David and Isabella Bennett, Jonathan Sprague, and Erin Burke—began busking as quirky robot characters on January 22, 2008, in San Diego's Balboa Park. For their first public performance, the group was entitled Steam Powered Giraffe Presents: Peoplebots. Later that month they shortened the name to simply Steam Powered Giraffe.

The original four robot characters were "The Spine" (David Bennett), "Rabbit" (Bunny Bennett), "The Jon" (Jon Sprague), and "Upgrade" (Erin Burke).

David Michael Bennett has stated on the twins' podcast, The Bennettarium, that losing his job in the wake of the 2008 financial crisis spurred him and the band to begin producing their first album and subsequently turn Steam Powered Giraffe into a full-time career.

In January 2009, the group began performing alongside backing musician Michael Philip Reed. In May, the band released its first single, "On Top of the Universe", and announced that it would be included on their upcoming first album.

In October 2009, the band released their first album, Album One. Initially only available at an October 30 album release show, the album was released online in November of that year.

The group performed semi-regularly at Balboa Park throughout 2008, 2009 and 2010, with their final performance in the park in January 2011.

=== 2011-2012: San Diego Zoo, The 2¢ Show, and lineup changes ===
In early 2011 the band released a single, "Honeybee", announcing that it would be on an upcoming second album.

Erin Burke left Steam Powered Giraffe in January 2011 to pursue a career in acting. The group later re-released Album One in September 2011, removing Burke's vocals and replacing the track "I Am Not Alone" (which featured Burke as the lead singer) with "Ice Cream Parade". According to the band, this change was made after the people who hired them for their San Diego Zoo performances suggested it. While not forced to comply, the band agreed in order to ensure the album sold at the zoo reflected the current lineup. The original 2009 version of Album One was re-released in 2017 with all of its original recordings intact, and included “Ice Cream Parade” from the 2011 edition as an extra added track.

In May 2011, the band announced that they would be performing as part of the San Diego Zoo's "Nighttime Zoo", running from June through September. They would return to perform for Nighttime Zoo again in 2012.

In May 2011 the band released a concert video on DVD and digital video entitled Steam Powered Giraffe and the Quest For the Eternal Harp of Golden Dreams). Later in 2011 the band released a "live" album entitled Live at the Globe of Yesterday's Tomorrow. This album used the song recordings from the Eternal Harp film, but featured newly recorded banter between tracks and humorous crowd sounds.

Steam Powered Giraffe's second studio album, The 2¢ Show, was released in May 2012.

On September 24, 2012, the band announced on their social media pages that Jon Sprague would no longer be a part of the group. On October 1, it was announced that Sam Luke, then the group's drummer, would become a new robot in the band called "Hatchworth". On November 2, 2012, Hatchworth made his stage debut with the group at Youmacon in Detroit, Michigan, with Mike Buxbaum of the band A City Serene filling in on drums. Matthew Elton Smith was later named as the group's new official drummer.

=== 2013-2016: MK III, The Vice Quadrant, and Quintessential ===
On July 18, 2013, Steam Powered Giraffe hosted their own one-day convention, Walter Robotics Expo 2013, with vendor tables and appearances by fellow steampunk performers Professor Elemental and The League of S.T.E.A.M.

On August 9, 2013, the band announced the title to their third album, MK III. The album released on December 3, 2013.

Beginning in 2013, Steam Powered Giraffe introduced several new characters to the act. The first of these were the Walter Workers (initially referred to as "Walter Girls"), white-skinned and blue-haired characters who initially started out manning the band's merchandise table at shows, but gradually were integrated into the stage performances. Within the fictional mythology of Steam Powered Giraffe, the Walter Workers are "blue matter engineers" employed by Walter Robotics (the fictional company which owns and operates the robots) and are responsible for maintaining and repairing the robots during live performances. Also added to the show in July 2013 was G.G. the Giraffe, a robotic baby giraffe puppet (voiced and puppeteered by Isabella Bennett). G.G.'s first appearance was in the music video for the band's cover of Rihanna's "Diamonds", released in June 2013. Two additional characters, Beebop and QWERTY, portrayed on stage with projections and video, made their first appearances in the band's live shows in 2013 and were voiced by the band's sound engineer, Steve Negrete.

At the beginning of 2014, the character of Rabbit officially became female, coinciding with performer Isabella Bunny Bennett's own public transition as a transgender woman. Isabella Bennett, long referred to by the nickname "Bunny", legally changed her name to Isabella on January 22, 2016—the band's 8th anniversary.

On March 18, 2014, it was announced that backing musicians Michael Reed and Matt Smith would no longer be performing members of Steam Powered Giraffe. The Bennett twins stated on their podcast The Bennettarium that this was to focus more on the theatrical elements of the act and to reduce the cost and logistics of touring.

In September 2014, Steam Powered Giraffe gave their first international performance, playing at the Grand Canadian Steampunk Exposition in Niagara-on-the-Lake, Ontario. They returned again for the event in 2015.

On September 1, 2015, Steam Powered Giraffe released The Vice Quadrant: A Space Opera, a two-disc space opera concept album containing 28 tracks across two discs (with the iTunes release being two separate albums). The album featured the band's first collaboration in a studio album, with vocals provided by Professor Elemental on the song "Sky Sharks".

In December 2015, the video game SteamWorld Heist was released for the Nintendo 3DS. The game's soundtrack was composed and recorded by Steam Powered Giraffe, whose robot characters appeared in-game as non-player characters. The band also released an album entitled Music from SteamWorld Heist, which included six original songs and six re-recordings of existing Steam Powered Giraffe songs, as well as the game's instrumental main theme.

The video game Battleborn by Gearbox Software released on May 3, 2016, and included an unlockable theme song created by Steam Powered Giraffe for the character of Montana; the same day, the band released the song on digital platforms as a single.

In August 2016, the band performed for the first time outside North America, at Weekend at the Asylum, a steampunk festival in Lincoln, UK.

On August 31, 2016, Steam Powered Giraffe released their fifth studio album, Quintessential.

=== 2017-2019: New member & 10th anniversary ===
On December 19, 2016, Steam Powered Giraffe announced that Samuel Luke would be leaving the group to focus on his independent work as an artist and musician. At the same time, it was announced that actor/musician Bryan Barbarin—a long-time friend of the Bennett twins who had performed improv with them and had also taken Jerry Hager's mime course in college—would be stepping in as a new robot character, Zer0. This announcement also coincided with the release of Zer0's first song with the band, a cover of Bing Crosby's "A Marshmallow World". The next episode of the Bennett twins' podcast The Bennettarium, released two days after the announcement, featured the Bennett twins, Luke, and Barbarin discussing the transition, among other things. Zer0's first live show occurred on February 18, 2017, at The Center Theater at The California Center for the Arts in Escondido, California, a frequent location for the band's performances.

In May 2017, the band announced their first vinyl record, a re-release of Music from Steamworld Heist. The band would subsequently release the followings albums on vinyl: The 2¢ Show in 2019, 1896 in 2021, MK III in 2024 and Music from SteamWorld Heist II in 2025.

On July 20, 2017, the band performed a show during San Diego Comic-Con with former member Michael Philip Reed joining them on stage. Reed joined the band for additional shows up until February 2020.

On January 27, 2018, Steam Powered Giraffe celebrated the band's 10th anniversary with a special concert at the Center Theater at the California Center for the Arts, Escondido. The event featured all current and previous members of the band, including past robots Hatchworth, Upgrade, and The Jon (reprised by performers Sam Luke, Erin Burke, and Jon Sprague respectively), and backing musicians Michael Philip Reed and Matt Smith. The concert was later released as a live concert film on Blu-Ray, DVD, and digital video.

On April 18, 2019, the band announced the production of their next album 1896, the first to feature Zer0 and the first since MK III to include Michael Reed. In the run-up to the album's release, the band stated they would release singles and music videos every few months.

=== 2020-present: 1896, Music from SteamWorld Heist II, and Rabbit's departure ===
On March 3, 2020, the band announced that Michael Reed was leaving the band to move out of the country. Reed had provided contributions to the band's then-upcoming sixth studio album prior to his departure. In July 2020, the band announced that due to inappropriate interactions with fans which had come to light after his departure, Steam Powered Giraffe would not be working with Michael Reed again. Live show sound technician Steve Negrete also resigned from the band in July 2020 due to conduct (not directly related to the Reed allegations) which came to light at the same time.

On November 9, 2020, Steam Powered Giraffe released their sixth studio album, 1896. The album featured 22 songs across two discs, with the second disc consisting of ten acoustic versions of songs. 1896 was re-released on vinyl in 2021 after a Bandcamp crowdfunding campaign.

On August 8, 2024, the band released their newest album, Music from SteamWorld Heist II, a two-disc album featuring 15 brand new songs, each with an accompanying instrumental version. Following a successful Bandcamp crowdfunding campaign in late 2024, the album was re-released on vinyl.

In 2024, Steam Powered Giraffe began performing live concerts again in San Diego, California, and then resumed touring in 2025, marking their first shows since their last performance in Escondido on February 29, 2020, before the COVID-19 pandemic. Their 2025 tour included performances across eight U.S. states, as well as two international stops: a show in Fergus, Ontario, and a return to the United Kingdom for the Weekend at the Asylum steampunk festival in Lincoln.

On November 21, 2025, the band released a cover of Audrey Hepburn's "Moon River", dedicated to their mime professor, Jerry Hager, whose wife passed away in 2024. The original song held special significance for the couple. Because of the personal nature of the tribute, David reached out to former band members to contribute vocals to the cover, and Erin Burke agreed to participate.

On July 23, 2026, the band announced on their YouTube channel that Isabella Bunny Bennett would be leaving the band due to mental health issues. David Bennett stated the decision was mutually respectful and "made sense" for the band, having been discussed privately "for some time" leading up to the announcement. It was also stated that Sam Luke, who previously performed in the band as Hatchworth, would be reprising his role for the remainder of their concerts and performances in 2026.

On September 1, 2026, the band announced the introduction of a new robot character, Toast, played by Eliana Payne, who had also taken Jerry Hager's mime course in college. They would be replacing Sam Luke, who had stood in for Isabella Bunny Bennett while the band searched for a new member.

== Band members ==
=== Current line-up ===
Robots

- The Spine (David Michael Bennett) is a futuristic silver robot who wears a wide-brimmed black fedora, and is often the "straight man" in the band's comedic skits. Originally a plain silver color, his appearance eventually gained a more segmented, paneled appearance, with silver plates on his back.

– lead and backing vocals, guitars, bass, mandolin, keyboards, recording engineer, producer (2008–present)

- Zer0 (Bryan Barbarin) is an art deco-inspired robot, often portrayed with a naïve demeanor and a child-like sense of wonder. He has a gold face with silver panels and a black beard, and over the years has been portrayed with either dreadlocks or an afro. His costume previously featured a large metal chain with a glowing blue pendant, but as of November 2024 instead features a large silver zipper pull.

– lead and backing vocals, bass (2016–present)

- Toast (Eliana Payne) TBA

- TBA (2026–present)

Humans

- Walter Workers Chelsea and Camille (Chelsea Penyak & Camille Penyak) – robot maintenance technicians, on-stage dance & ballet accompaniment, merchandise sales (2014–present)
- Lacey Johnson – keyboard, keytar, electric guitar, backing vocals (2024–present)
- Astrud Aurelia – percussion (2025–present)

=== Past members ===
Robots

- Upgrade (Erin Burke) was a female robot with a pink face and a demeanor which varied between serious and silly. She was one of the original four members, and left the band in January 2011.

– vocals, tambourine (2008–2011; guest: 2018, 2025)

- The Jon (Jonathan Sprague) was an art deco robot with a paneled gold face and a whimsical personality, who wore a top hat, red suspenders, and a bow tie. He was one of the original four members, and left the band in September 2012.

– lead and backing vocals, guitar, mandolin, bass, drums (2008–2012; guest: 2018)

- Hatchworth (Samuel Luke) was an art deco robot with a swirling bronze and copper/gold accented design, portrayed as quirky and naïve. His costume included a glowing blue chest circle and a bowler hat with a steam pipe. He left the band in December 2016. He briefly returned in July and August 2026 to replace Rabbit for those months' live shows.

– lead and backing vocals, bass, guitar (2012–2016; session member: 2011-2012, 2026; guest: 2018) (Note: Luke's time as a session member in 2011-2012 was as a human performer, before taking on the role of Hatchworth. When Rabbit left the band in 2026, Luke, as Hatchworth, replaced her until Toast took over as full-time member.)

- Rabbit (Isabella Bunny Bennett) was a steampunk clockwork robot, typically the zaniest and most chaotic of the trio during performances. Prior to 2014, Rabbit appeared as a skeletal copper Victorian man with silver accents, a short top hat, and goggles; in 2014, Rabbit's new female design added glowing boiler vents and a corseted waist. Since then, Rabbit's appearance has varied, with different makeup designs and costume elements. As of November 2024, Rabbit had an oxidized copper and white-paneled face, purple and magenta hair, and a short top hat with goggles. She was one of the original four members, and left the band in 2026.

– lead and backing vocals, accordion, keytar, megaphone, melodica, tambourine (2008–2026)

Humans

- Matthew Elton Smith – percussion, backing vocals (2012–2014: guest: 2018)
- Michael Philip Reed – multi-instrumentalist, lead and backing vocals (2009–2014, 2017–2020)
- Brianna Clawson – Walter Worker character, merchandise (2012–2013)
- Paige Law – Walter Worker character, merchandise (2012–2014)
- Carolina Gumbayan – Walter Worker character, merchandise, bass (2013–2014)
- Steve Negrete – live show audio engineering, voice-acting characters of Beebop and QWERTY (2009–2020)
- David Butterfield – percussion, backing vocals (2024–2025, part-time)

== Discography ==
=== Studio albums ===
- Album One (2009) (re-released in 2011)
- The 2¢ Show (2012)
- MK III (2013)
- The Vice Quadrant: A Space Opera (2015)
- Quintessential (2016)
- 1896 (2020)

=== Live albums ===
- Live at the Globe of Yesterday's Tomorrow (2011)
- Live at the Walter Robotics Expo 2013 (2014)
- Not Live and Not in Person (2020)
- Skeleton Hoedown 2024 (2025)

=== Soundtrack albums ===
- Music From SteamWorld Heist (2015)
- Music From SteamWorld Heist II (2024)

=== Cover albums ===
- Cover Songs Vol. 1 (2025)

=== Concert films ===
- The Quest for the Eternal Harp of Golden Dreams (2012)
- Live at Walter Robotics Expo 2013 (2014)
- Concierto Privado (2016)
- 10 Year Anniversary Show (2018)
- Live in Denver Colorado (2018)
- Live in La Jolla California (2019)
- Live from Walter Manor – Acoustic Livestream Concert (2023)
- Yulemas Special Show - Acoustic Livestream Concert (2024)
- Skeleton Hoedown (2024)

=== Singles ===
- "On Top of the Universe" (2009)
- "Honeybee" (2011)
- "Montana" (2016), in collaboration with 2016 video game Battleborn
- "Shattered Stars" (2019)
- "Latum Alterum (Ya Ya Ya)" (2019)
- "Hot on the Trail" (2019)
- "Transform" (2019)
- "Lyin' Awake" (2020)
- "Eat Your Heart" (2020)
- "Intertwined" (2020)
- "Bad Days on the Horizon" (2020)
- "Olly and the Equinox Band" (2020)
- "Fart Patrol" (2021)
- "Twinkle Twinkle Little Star" (2021)
- "A Life of Un-Delightment" (2024), in collaboration with 2024 video game SteamWorld Heist II
- "Honeybee (Lo-Fi)" (2024)

=== Covers ===
- "Diamonds" (Rihanna cover, 2013)
- "I Love It" (Icona Pop cover, 2013)
- "Harder, Better, Faster, Stronger" (Daft Punk cover, 2014)
- "Cellophane" (Sia cover, 2015)
- "A Marshmallow World" (Bing Crosby cover, 2016)
- "Summertime Sadness" (Lana Del Rey cover, 2021)
- "Harmony" (Elton John cover, 2022)
- "Un-Break My Heart" (Toni Braxton cover, 2022)
- "Pink Pony Club" (Chappell Roan cover, 2025)
- "Moon River" (Audrey Hepburn cover, 2025)

=== Vinyl album re-releases ===
- Music from Steamworld Heist (2017 re-release)
- The 2¢ Show (2019 re-release)
- 1896 (2021 re-release)
- MK III (2024 re-release)
- Music from SteamWorld Heist II (2025 re-release)

=== Featured On ===
- "Weird Weird West" (Professor Elemental song, 2015)
- "The Incredible Jelly Donut Juicer" (The Cog is Dead song, 2015)

== See also ==
- List of steampunk musicians
