= SteamWorld Tower Defense =

2010 video game

- Developer: Image & Form
- Publishers: Image & Form
- Series: SteamWorld
- Platform: DSiWare
- Release: July 5, 2010
- Genres: Real-time strategy, tower defense
- Mode: Single-player

SteamWorld Tower Defense is a tower defense video game by Swedish video game developer Image & Form. It was released digitally on Nintendo DSi in North America, Europe and Australia on July 5, 2010. It is the first game released in the SteamWorld series.

== Gameplay ==
In SteamWorld Tower Defense the player controls an army of steam-powered robots in a tower defense-style gameplay. The aim of the game is to take down wandering troops of human invaders in their attempt to steal gold from the robots' mining facilities. To clear a mission, the player must take down waves of human soldiers by building and strategically placing out attack robots with a range of abilities and weapons. It's possible to play the game on several difficulty levels.

== Reception ==
Reception

Aggregate score
Aggregator	Score
Metacritic	71/100

Review scores
Publication	Score
IGN	8/10
Nintendo Life	6/10
Nintendo World Report	7/10

SteamWorld Tower Defense on Nintendo DSi has received "mixed or average" reviews from critics, with a current score of 71/100 on Metacritic.

Lucas M Thomas of IGN gave the game an eight out of ten, praising how polished the game's presentation was for a DSi title. Andrew Wight of Nintendo Life noted that the game's fun was accompanied by "frustratingly difficult" segments that hindered its overall quality, praising it for being a fun title nevertheless.

== Development ==
On their YouTube channel, Image & Form revealed that SteamWorld Tower Defense is the hardest game the studio has created. Apparently, the game's lead developer is the only of Image & Form employees to finish the game.

The game is set before the events depicted in SteamWorld Dig and SteamWorld Heist.
