= SteamWorld =

Video game series

- Developers: Image & Form; Thunderful Development; The Station
- Publishers: Image & Form; Thunderful Publishing
- Platforms: Nintendo DSi; Nintendo 3DS; Windows; OS X Linux; PlayStation 4 PlayStation Vita; Wii U Xbox One; Nintendo Switch; Stadia; PlayStation 5 Xbox Series X/S
- First release: SteamWorld Tower Defense; July 5, 2010
- Latest release: SteamWorld Heist II; August 8, 2024

SteamWorld is an anthology series of video games created by Image & Form. All games depict the adventures of a race of steam-driven robots in a post-apocalyptic steampunk world, with different genres for each game, ranging from action and strategy to role-playing and simulation.

== Story overview ==
The story of SteamWorld begins in a post-apocalyptic Earth, where human society has fallen into collapse. SteamWorld Tower Defense tells the story of a huge war between humans and robots for the control of Earth. After a long conflict, the robots prevented the human invasion and the surviving humans took refuge in the underground. Since then the bots began forming a civilization reminiscent of the American Old West, with the upper classes composed of bots running on petrol, while the lower classes run on coal to survive. In SteamWorld Dig, a robot miner called Rusty inherits his uncle's mine and begins digging all the way to the ruins of an ancient race of electronic bots called the "Vectron", who is reactivated with his arrival. To prevent the Vectron from taking over the surface, Rusty defeats them, but disappears.

In SteamWorld Dig 2, a young robot girl called Dorothy who is Rusty's friend, looks for Rusty's whereabouts and discover that he was captured by the Humans, who intend to take control of the Vectron technology to reclaim the surface. However, the Vectron reactor in their possession overloads, causing a chain reaction that destroys Earth, with Rusty and Dorothy surviving by boarding one among several rockets created to evacuate the bots from the planet. The creation of one of these rockets is shown in SteamWorld Build, where a mysterious robot called Core guides a bot population to settle near an old mine where they dig up parts of a rocket. Once the rocket is completed, Core reveals himself as part of the Vectron Hivemind who infiltrates the rocket's systems as they take the city's inhabitants to safety.

== List of SteamWorld games ==
| Title | Year | Platform(s) | Genre(s) |
|---|---|---|---|
| SteamWorld Tower Defense | 2010 | Nintendo DSi | Real-time strategy, tower defense |
| SteamWorld Dig | 2013 | Nintendo 3DS, Microsoft Windows, macOS, Linux | Platformer, action-adventure, metroidvania |
| SteamWorld Dig | 2014 | PlayStation 4, PlayStation Vita, Wii U | Platformer, action-adventure, metroidvania |
| SteamWorld Dig | 2015 | Xbox One | Platformer, action-adventure, metroidvania |
| SteamWorld Dig | 2018 | Nintendo Switch | Platformer, action-adventure, metroidvania |
| SteamWorld Dig | 2020 | Stadia | Platformer, action-adventure, metroidvania |
| SteamWorld Heist | 2015 | Nintendo 3DS | Turn-based strategy, action-adventure |
| SteamWorld Heist | 2016 | Microsoft Windows, macOS, Linux, PlayStation 4, PlayStation Vita, Wii U, iOS | Turn-based strategy, action-adventure |
| SteamWorld Heist | 2017 | Nintendo Switch | Turn-based strategy, action-adventure |
| SteamWorld Heist | 2020 | Stadia | Turn-based strategy, action-adventure |
| SteamWorld Dig 2 | 2017 | Nintendo Switch, Microsoft Windows, macOS, Linux, PlayStation 4, PlayStation Vita | Platformer, action-adventure, metroidvania |
| SteamWorld Dig 2 | 2018 | Nintendo 3DS, Xbox One | Platformer, action-adventure, metroidvania |
| SteamWorld Dig 2 | 2020 | Stadia | Platformer, action-adventure, metroidvania |
| SteamWorld Quest | 2019 | Nintendo Switch, Microsoft Windows, macOS, Linux | Role-playing, deck-building |
| SteamWorld Quest | 2020 | Stadia | Role-playing, deck-building |
| SteamWorld Build | 2023 | Microsoft Windows, Nintendo Switch, PlayStation 4, PlayStation 5, Xbox One, Xbox Series X/S | Construction and management simulation |
| SteamWorld Heist II | 2024 | Microsoft Windows, Nintendo Switch, PlayStation 4, PlayStation 5, Xbox One, Xbox Series X/S | Turn-based strategy, action-adventure |
| SteamWorld: Headhunter | On hold | TBA | Action-adventure |
