= Bergsala =

Swedish distribution company

Bergsala AB
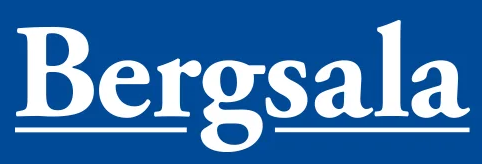
- Type: Private
- Industry: Video games
- Founded: 20 April 1976; 50 years ago
- Founders: Owe Bergsten; Pierre Sandsten; Lars-Göran Larsson
- Headquarters: Kungsbacka, Sweden
- Parent: Bergsala Holding (2012–2019); Thunderful Group (2019–2024)

Bergsala AB is a Swedish distribution company based in Kungsbacka. It was established in 1976 and has operated as the agent and distributor of Nintendo products in the Nordic countries since 1981. Bergsala's administrative center and warehouse is in Kungsbacka, with local offices in Norway, Denmark, and Finland.

== History ==
Bergsala was founded as a small electronics company by Owe Bergsten, Pierre Sandsten, and Lars-Göran Larsson on 20 April 1976 in Kungsbacka, Sweden. While on a trip to Singapore in 1981, the business partner saw an early Game & Watch LCD game at an electronic store and purchased one for the flight home to Sweden, having heard that LCD games would likely become popular. Realizing its potential, Bergsten found it was Nintendo that made the game, and sent a telex message to Nintendo's Japanese headquarters, pretending to be a larger distributor and seeking to resell their Game & Watch products in Sweden. After several months, Nintendo agreed to sell him 250 units, but Bergsten found these difficult to sell, as at that point, the Swedish population did not show much interest in video games.

Within the year, a colleague returned from Japan and showed Bergsten the new color-based Game & Watch models. Bergsten decided to fly to Japan and speak to Nintendo directly about ordering these units. The trip had several mishaps that nearly caused the meeting not to happen, but by the end of the trip, Bergsten had secured the distribution rights to Nintendo products for Sweden. Initially he had purchased 30,000 units for Sweden but these sold slowly, until he found a watch distributor that saw the potential for the LCD games. By the start of 1982, Bergsten was selling 180,000 units a month. He made frequent trips back to Nintendo to obtain more orders including new versions of the Game & Watch hardware, and by January 1983, had sold over 1.7 million units in Sweden. Around that time, the Swedish market for games became saturated, and sales had significantly dropped.

Bergsten continued to keep in contact with Nintendo over the next year as he was expecting them to release new products: at this point, the 1983 video game crash had decimated the North American market, while Nintendo was preparing to launch its Family Computer (Famicom) unit. Bergsten brought some of the Famicom units and NTSC-compatible televisions back to Sweden after one trip to Nintendo, and from reactions of his staff and associates, believed it would be as successful as the Game & Watch in Sweden. He tried to convince Nintendo to release a compatible Famicom system in Europe, but Nintendo was wary of any television-based video game system due to the 1983 crash. Bergsten continued to urge Nintendo to release the system in Europe, and by 1985, Nintendo agreed to send him about 10,000 units, modified Famicom units with PAL output. This never happened due to Nintendo having a change of heart and bringing a redesigned Family Computer, the Nintendo Entertainment System (NES), to the West: after Nintendo released the North American version, the company created a PAL-compatible version of the NES for release in Europe.

Nintendo later founded Nintendo of Europe in 1990; however, Bergsala remained the authorised import partner and primary distributor of Nintendo products in the Nordic countries.

In addition, Bergsala was responsible for starting the first fan club for players of Nintendo's products, which would eventually become Club Nintendo. Bergsala's club, Nintendo Videospelklubb, launched alongside the NES release in Europe in 1986, had 450,000 members at the height of its success, and it served as a model for Nintendo of America's Nintendo Fun Club.

== Current operations ==
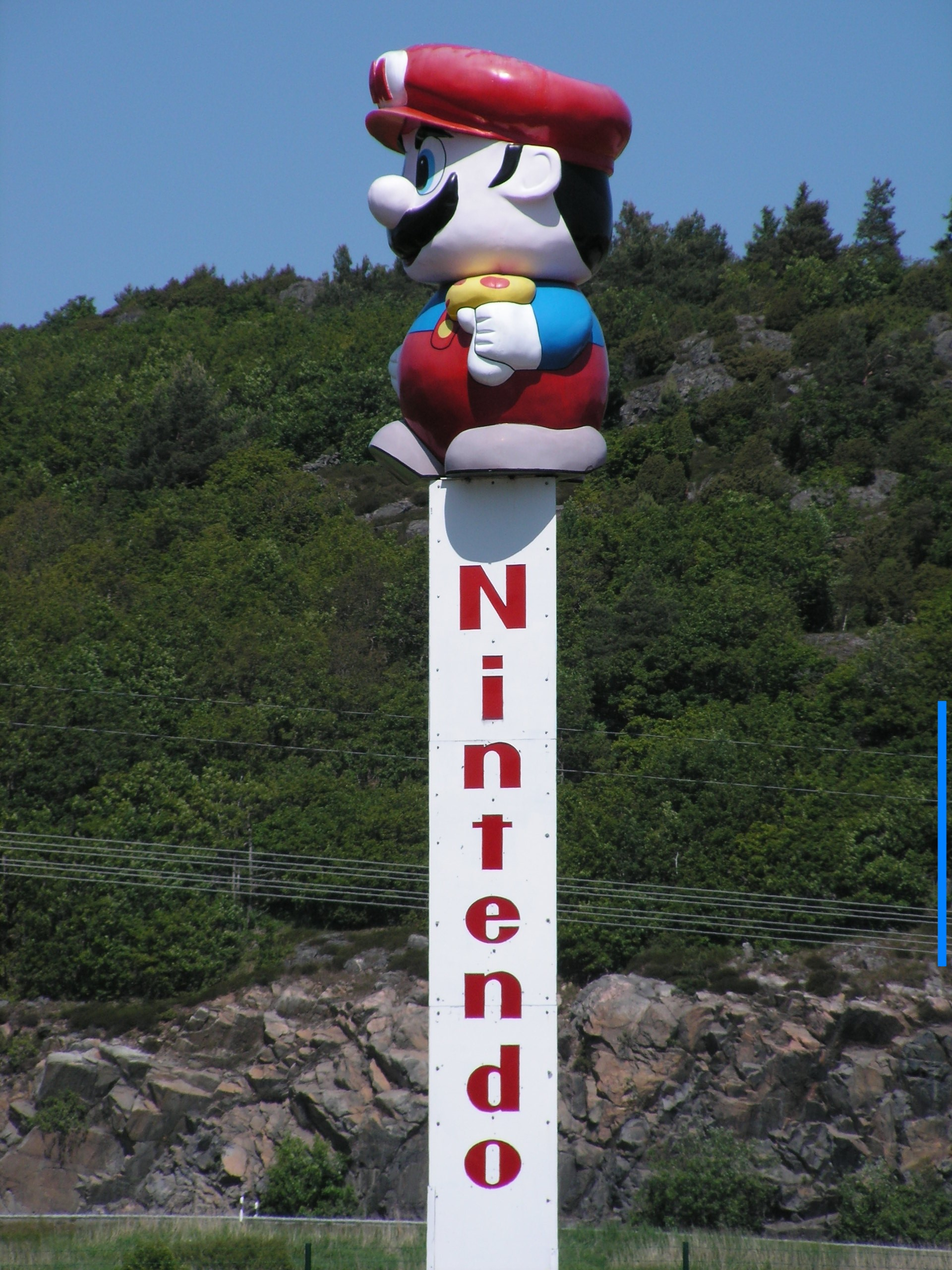
The original Mario statue that stood outside Bergsala's offices since the 1980s until 2016, when it was replaced with another statue more faithful to the character's modern design

Bergsala's headquarters in Kungsbacka are located at Marios gata 21 (Mario's Street 21), named after the famous Nintendo character Mario. Early on, the company had constructed a statue with Mario on top of it outside of its headquarters, which generally was considered a poor rendition of the character and had been compared to Saddam Hussein. In 2016, it replaced the statue with a more true-to-form version of Mario atop of a warp pipe.

In December 2019, Bergsala, as well as other Bergsala Holding-owned distributors, were combined with Bergsala Holding's developer and publisher Thunderful to create the Thunderful Group. Within the Thunderful Group, Bergsala became part of the Thunderful Distribution branch.

== Controversies ==
In early May 2025, it was reported that around 80 complaints had been submitted within less than a month against Bergsala AB, the company that imports Nintendo's game consoles into Sweden and holds exclusive distribution rights for Nintendo products in the country. Several complaints noted that the upcoming Nintendo Switch 2 console was priced about 30 percent higher in Sweden than in the rest of Europe.
