= SteamWorld Dig =

2013 video game

- Developer: Image & Form
- Publishers: Image & Form
- Series: SteamWorld
- Platforms: Nintendo 3DS; Windows; OS X; Linux; PlayStation 4; PlayStation Vita; Xbox One; Wii U; Nintendo Switch; Stadia
- Release: 7 August 2013: Nintendo 3DS; EU: 7 August 2013; AU: 7 August 2013; NA: 8 August 2013; JP: 20 November 2013 Windows, OS X, Linux; WW: 5 December 2013 PS4, Vita; NA: 18 March 2014; EU: 19 March 2014; JP: 3 December 2014 Wii U; NA: 28 August 2014; EU: 28 August 2014; JP: 17 December 2014 Xbox One; WW: 5 June 2015 Switch; NA: 1 February 2018; EU: 1 February 2018 Stadia; WW: 10 March 2020 Amazon Luna; US: 20 October 2020
- Genres: Platform, action-adventure, metroidvania
- Mode: Single-player

SteamWorld Dig is a platform action-adventure game created by Swedish video game developer Image & Form. The second installment in the SteamWorld series after SteamWorld Tower Defense, SteamWorld Dig has the player control Rusty, a steam-powered robot who arrives at a small Western-Steampunk mining town called Tumbleton after having received a deed for a mine from his long-forgotten uncle, Joe. The objective of the game is to dig through Tumbleton's mine, which also involves solving puzzles and platforming to avoid traps and enemies.

SteamWorld Dig was initially released on the Nintendo eShop for the Nintendo 3DS in Europe and Australia on 7 August 2013, North America on 8 August 2013, and Japan on 20 November 2013. Later, SteamWorld Dig was released on 5 December 2013 for Microsoft Windows, Mac, and Linux on Steam, on 18 March 2014 in North America and on 19 March 2014 in Europe for PlayStation 4 and PlayStation Vita, on 28 August 2014 for Wii U, on 5 June 2015 for Xbox One, and on 1 February 2018 for Nintendo Switch. A successor, SteamWorld Heist, was released in December 2015. A sequel, SteamWorld Dig 2, was released in September 2017. It was released on Google's cloud gaming service Stadia on 10 March 2020, and on Amazon's cloud gaming service Luna on 20 October 2020.

== Gameplay ==
SteamWorld Dig is a 2D platform game that revolves around mining for resources and ores. The objective of the game is to investigate the mines underneath the old Western town Tumbleton in order to unearth the secrets lurking below. The player controls Rusty, a steam-powered robot who is equipped with a pickaxe, but can gain access to a variety of tools, such as a drill and dynamite. The player can upgrade the tools used for digging as progression is made in the game. Besides health, the player also needs coal for light, and water for special abilities.

SteamWorld Dig has platform elements in that the player runs, jumps and encounters foes, but the main objective is mining. That means that the player builds – or rather deconstructs – the game world and creates platforms that way. The player collects ores and resources which can be brought back to the surface and exchanged for cash. When the player progresses in the game, new abilities are unlocked. Each playthrough, the mines are randomized, making items and treasure appear in different locations. If the player gets stuck there is a self-destruct function, but the players can also buy ladders in the store at the surface to get out of tricky situations.

When progressing deeper down in the cave, the player encounters various enemies with different attack patterns and weak spots. The game features multiple subterranean worlds, each with a completely different environment. Dying results in a reparation penalty fee, and the player respawns back on the surface. All the loot that has been accumulated when the player dies can be picked up again.

== Reception ==
Reception

Aggregate score
Aggregator	Score
Metacritic	3DS: 82/100; PC: 76/100; PS4: 82/100; WIIU: 83/100; XONE: 83/100; NS: 75/100

Review scores
Publication	Score
Destructoid	7.5/10
Eurogamer	8/10
GameSpot	7/10
IGN	9.5/10
Nintendo Life	8/10
Official Nintendo Magazine	9/10
PlayStation Official Magazine – UK	8/10
Pocket Gamer	5/5
USgamer	5/5

SteamWorld Dig has received favorable reviews, with the Nintendo 3DS and Windows versions receiving scores of 82/100 and 76/100 respectively on Metacritic. Pocket Gamer gave it a 10 out of 10 saying "SteamWorld Dig is an utterly phenomenal video game, with layer upon layer of remarkable gameplay to be found." IGN liked its core gameplay mechanics and engrossing atmosphere and gave it a 9.5 out 10. Nintendo World Report gave it a 9 out of 10 saying that "SteamWorld Dig is a fresh game for the Nintendo eShop and one of the best digital games available on Nintendo's 3D handheld." Infendo gave it 4 stars out of 5, calling it "highly addicting."

SteamWorld Dig was nominated for IGN's Black Beta Select Awards 2013 in the categories "Best Original Game", "Best Indie Game", "Best Handheld/Mobile Game" and "Overall Game of the Year", while Gamasutra's Christian Nutt picked it as one of the top 5 games of 2013. On Eurogamer, SteamWorld Dig was nominated for Readers' Top 50 Games.

== Legacy ==
After the release of the game, Image & Form started development on a game in the same universe as SteamWorld Dig, but not a direct sequel nor a game in the same genre. This game would later be revealed as SteamWorld Heist, which first released on Nintendo 3DS in December 2015. In February 2017, Image & Form revealed SteamWorld Dig 2 for the Nintendo Switch. This game is a direct sequel to SteamWorld Dig and retains its core gameplay, but now features Dorothy, one of Tumbleton's residents, as the main character instead of Rusty.

Rusty was slated to appear as a playable cameo character in the unreleased party game Hex Heroes.
