= Image & Form =

Swedish video game developer

Image & Form International AB
- Type: Subsidiary
- Industry: Video games
- Founded: 1997; 29 years ago
- Founder: Brjánn Sigurgeirsson
- Defunct: 2020
- Fate: Merged
- Successor: Thunderful Development
- Headquarters: Gothenburg, Sweden
- Key people: Brjánn Sigurgeirsson (CEO)
- Number of employees: 25 (2019)
- Parent: Thunderful Group (2018–2020)
- Website: imageform.se

Image & Form International AB was a Swedish video game developer based in Gothenburg. The company was founded by Brjánn Sigurgeirsson in 1997 and formed the Thunderful group with Zoink in 2017. In 2020, Image & Form was integrated into Thunderful Development.

== History ==
Image & Form was founded by Brjánn Sigurgeirsson, who acts as its CEO, and an unnamed co-founder in 1997. Sigurgeirsson had collected experience in web design after working in Tokyo and San Francisco, and when he applied for several jobs of the same type in Gothenburg and would have gotten all of them, he established Image & Form as a two-man multimedia and web operation to capitalise on this industry. While Sigurgeirsson intended to call the company Imagenation, his co-founder wished for it to be called Monkey Business; a vote between their friends was to resolve this dispute, though a third suggestion, "Image & Form", received the best reception.

The business soon expanded with web-based game production, and in 2002, it was contracted to complete an edutainment game project for a Norwegian publisher. After that project was finished, the two companies continued co-operating on games made entirely by Image & Form. This continued as a side-business for Image & Form until 2007, when the publisher asked for speed up production to produce eight games per year, up from previously one game in 18 months. The series was sold to a Danish publisher that eventually closed in 2009. Through this development, Image & Form created 30 edutainment games in the same series between 2007 and early 2010. Image & Form's portfolio diversified when it released its first iOS game, Gyro the Sheepdog, in late 2009. Following on from this, Image & Form also released Mariachi Hero, Hugo Troll Race, and, in October 2011, Anthill. Its most successful series of games, SteamWorld, started with the release of SteamWorld Tower Defense on Nintendo DSi in 2010. In late 2011, Bergsala Holding acquired 50% of the company, and Image & Form became the former's primary development arm. Sigurgeirsson, Bergsala Holding, and Zoink's Klaus Lyngeled decided to merge the two studios and create Thunderful as their parent company in December 2017. By April 2019, Image & Form had 25 employees. In 2020, Thunderful (now called Thunderful Group) merged Zoink with Image & Form and Guru Games to create Thunderful Development. After Thunderful underwent multiple restructurings in which many employees were laid off in 2024, employees of Image & Form who had since been integrated into Thunderful reported on November 16 that none of its former staff were employed at Thunderful anymore.

== Games developed ==
Year	Title	Platform(s)
2010	SteamWorld Tower Defense	Nintendo DSi
2011	Anthill	Android, Apple iOS
2013	SteamWorld Dig	Linux, macOS, Microsoft Windows, Nintendo 3DS, Nintendo Switch, Nintendo Wii U, PlayStation 4, PlayStation Vita, Xbox One, Google Stadia
2015	SteamWorld Heist	Linux, macOS, Microsoft Windows, Nintendo 3DS, Nintendo Switch, Nintendo Wii U, Apple iOS, PlayStation 4, PlayStation Vita, Google Stadia
2017	SteamWorld Dig 2	Linux, macOS, Microsoft Windows, Nintendo 3DS, Nintendo Switch, PlayStation 4, PlayStation Vita, Xbox One
2019	SteamWorld Quest: Hand of Gilgamech	Linux, macOS, Microsoft Windows, Nintendo Switch, Apple iOS, Google Stadia
2021	The Gunk	Microsoft Windows, Xbox Series X, Xbox One
