= SteamWorld Dig 2 =

2017 video game

- Developer: Image & Form
- Publishers: Image & Form; Rising Star Games (retail)
- Series: SteamWorld
- Platforms: Nintendo Switch; Linux; macOS; Windows; PlayStation 4; PlayStation Vita; Nintendo 3DS; Xbox One; Stadia
- Release: Nintendo Switch: WW: September 21, 2017; JP: November 23, 2017; Linux, macOS, Windows: WW: September 22, 2017; PlayStation 4, Vita: NA: September 26, 2017; EU: September 27, 2017; Nintendo 3DS: NA: February 22, 2018; EU: February 22, 2018; Xbox One: WW: November 21, 2018; Stadia: WW: March 1, 2020; Amazon Luna: US: October 20, 2020
- Genres: Platformer, action-adventure, metroidvania
- Mode: Single-player

SteamWorld Dig 2 is an action-adventure platform video game developed and published by Image & Form. It is the fourth installment in the SteamWorld series of games and the direct sequel to 2013's SteamWorld Dig. It was first released in September 2017 for Nintendo Switch, Linux, macOS, Windows, PlayStation 4, and PlayStation Vita. It was later released for Nintendo 3DS in February 2018, for Xbox One in November 2018, for Stadia in March 2020, and for Amazon Luna in October 2020. Publisher Rising Star Games released physical retail copies of the game for the Nintendo Switch and PlayStation 4 in 2018.

The game received positive reviews from critics, with praise for its improvements upon the original, as well as its world and gameplay.

== Gameplay ==
SteamWorld Dig 2 is a Metroidvania game. Carrying on from its predecessor, SteamWorld Dig, the game puts players in control of Dorothy, a steam-driven robot searching for Rusty, the protagonist of the previous game who disappeared. Gameplay largely involves exploring a vast underground mine, coming up against enemy creatures while finding various resources as the player digs their way downwards. As the game progresses, Dorothy can gain abilities and weapons such as pressure bombs, a hookshot, and a pneumatic arm that can punch through rock. Any resources found can be traded in for cash in the game's hub world, where the player can upgrade their health, weapons, and abilities. Each of the weapons have perks that can be activated by installing Upgrade Cogs found in secret areas. More blueprints for upgrades become available to the player by either increasing their level by killing enemies or completing quests, or by finding artifacts hidden in the mines.

== Plot ==
The story takes place in between the events of SteamWorld Dig and SteamWorld Heist. Following Rusty's disappearance at the end of SteamWorld Dig, Dorothy, a robot who he had befriended, travels to the mining town of El Machino in order to search for him. Along the way, she comes across Fen, a remnant of the Vectron that Rusty had previously fought, who joins Dorothy as a navigator. While searching the mines for Rusty while also hearing rumors of him turning into a monstrous machine, Dorothy comes across a group of devolved humans, called Shiners, addicted to the drug moon juice. The humans are led by Rosie, who instead of becoming addicted to moon juice took to lifting weights at a young age and who is much smarter than the other Shiners.

Rosie claims that mysterious machines are triggering earthquakes. Dorothy goes to destroy these machines, only to discover that Rosie had lied to her. In actuality, the machines were built by Rusty to prevent Rosie from harnessing the power of a fusion distillery in order to create more of the addictive substance known as moon juice in order to control the remaining humans and Rosie is revealed to be an unhinged maniac. Dorothy manages to defeat Rosie and rescue Rusty, only for the distillery to become unstable, prompting Fen to stay behind while she warps the two to safety, allowing them to escape on a rocket with the other El Machino residents before the planet explodes. As the robots explore space in order to set up a new civilization, Dorothy remains hopeful that she will one day be reunited with Fen.

== Reception ==
Reception

Aggregate score
Aggregator	Score
Metacritic	NS: 88/100; PC: 85/100; PS4: 85/100

Review scores
Publication	Score
Destructoid	8.5/10
Edge	8/10
Game Informer	8.5/10
GameSpot	9/10
IGN	8.8/10
Nintendo Life	9/10
Pocket Gamer	4.5/5

SteamWorld Dig 2 received positive reviews, with a score of 88 out of 100 on Metacritic.

The game was nominated for "Best Portable Game" in Destructoid's Game of the Year Awards 2017, for "Best Switch Game" and "Best Action-Adventure Game" in IGN's Best of 2017 Awards, for "Game Engineering" at the 17th Annual National Academy of Video Game Trade Reviewers Awards, and for "Best Indie Game" at the 2018 Golden Joystick Awards.
