= SteamWorld Heist =

2015 video game

- Developer: Image & Form
- Publishers: Image & Form
- Composers: Steam Powered Giraffe, Johannes Hedberg
- Series: SteamWorld
- Platforms: Nintendo 3DS, Microsoft Windows, OS X, Linux, PlayStation 4, PlayStation Vita, Wii U, Nintendo Switch, iOS, Stadia, Luna
- Release: Nintendo 3DS: WW: December 10, 2015; Microsoft Windows, OS X, Linux: WW: June 7, 2016; PlayStation 4, PlayStation Vita: NA: June 7, 2016; EU: June 8, 2016; AU: June 8, 2016; Wii U: EU: September 30, 2016; AU: September 30, 2016; NA: October 20, 2016; iOS: WW: November 9, 2016; Nintendo Switch: WW: December 28, 2017; Stadia: WW: March 10, 2020; Amazon Luna: US: October 20, 2020
- Genres: Turn-based tactics, action-adventure
- Mode: Single-player

SteamWorld Heist is a turn-based tactics shooter video game developed and published by Image & Form. The third installment of the SteamWorld series and the sequel to SteamWorld Dig, SteamWorld Heist has the player control Captain Piper Faraday, a smuggler and occasional pirate, as she recruits a ragtag team of robots and sets out on a space adventure. The objective of the game is for players to board, loot, and shoot their way through enemy spaceships.

SteamWorld Heist was released on the Nintendo eShop for the Nintendo 3DS in Europe, the Americas, Australia and New Zealand on December 10, 2015. It was released worldwide for Microsoft Windows, OS X and Linux through Steam on June 7, 2016, for the PlayStation 4 and the PlayStation Vita via the PlayStation Store on June 7, 2016, in North America and on June 8, 2016, in Europe and Australia. It was released both physically and digitally (through the Nintendo eShop) for the Wii U on September 30, 2016, in Europe and Australia and in North America on October 20, 2016. It was released worldwide on the iOS App store on November 9, 2016. On December 28, 2017, the game was released worldwide for the Nintendo Switch (via Nintendo eShop) under the subtitle Ultimate Edition. It was released on Google's cloud gaming service Stadia on March 10, 2020, and on Amazon's cloud gaming service Luna on October 20, 2020.

A sequel, SteamWorld Heist II, was released on August 8, 2024.

== Gameplay ==
SteamWorld Heist is a side-scrolling turn-based strategy game that emphasizes skill over chance. Players command a squad of robots through procedurally generated levels on enemy spaceships.

• Combat System: The core mechanic distinguishes itself from genre staples like XCOM by removing random hit percentages. Instead, players manually aim their characters' weapons. Successful attacks depend on the player's ability to line up shots, utilizing the environment to bounce bullets off surfaces ("trick shots") to bypass enemy shields and cover.

• Classes and Weapons: Crew members belong to different classes, such as Vanguards (tank-like brawlers), Sharpshooters (long-range snipers with laser sights), Assault (high-damage dealers), and Heavies (area-of-effect explosives experts). Weapons range from handguns and SMGs to rocket launchers, each requiring different tactical approaches.

• Loot and Progression: The primary objective in missions is often to loot the enemy ship. Players collect "swag" bags containing water (currency), new weapons, and utility items like repair kits or grenades. A signature feature of the game is Hats; players can shoot hats off enemies' heads and collect them to customize their crew's appearance.

• Difficulty and Modes: The game offers multiple difficulty settings that can be changed between missions. Completing the game unlocks "New Game+," allowing players to restart with their gathered hats and experience.

Story

Captain Piper Faraday, a respectable smuggler, leads a crew aboard her ship. Initially harassed by the Scrappers, a bandit faction bullying locals, Piper unites the scattered Steambots to fight back. As the crew pushes the Scrappers out of the "Outskirts," they encounter the Royalist Space Force, a powerful militaristic faction led by the Red Queen, who taxes the poor Steambots heavily.

While conflict escalates with the Royalists, a far greater threat emerges: the Vectron. The Vectron are an ancient, hive-mind race of energetic robots (first seen in SteamWorld Dig) that seek to assimilate or destroy all other life. Piper discovers that the Royalists and Scrappers are ill-equipped to stop the Vectron. She must journey into Deep Space, recruiting a diverse crew of specialists—including the former Royalist Sea Brass, the circus strongman Ivanski, and the cryptic Fen (via DLC)—to infiltrate the Vectron flagship. In the climax, the crew destroys the Vectron hive mind, saving robotkind from assimilation.

== Development ==
SteamWorld Heist was developed by the Swedish studio Image & Form. The developers aimed to create a strategy game that solved the frustration of "missing a 99% hit chance" common in the genre, leading to the manual aiming mechanic.

Soundtrack

The game's soundtrack was composed and performed by the real-life steam-punk band Steam Powered Giraffe. The band members appear in the game as robot troubadours found in bars, where they play songs that comment on the game's events.

Release and DLC

The game launched first on Nintendo 3DS on December 10, 2015. It was later ported to:

• PlayStation 4 & Vita: June 2016

• PC (Steam): June 2016

• Wii U: September 2016

• iOS: November 2016

• Nintendo Switch: December 2017 (as SteamWorld Heist: Ultimate Edition)

The Outsider (DLC)

A downloadable content pack titled "The Outsider" was released in 2016. It introduced a new playable character, Fen, a mysterious outcast who uses a lightning gun that can pierce enemies. The DLC also added new missions, weapons, and hats.

Reception

SteamWorld Heist received critical acclaim upon release. Critics praised the manual aiming system for adding a layer of skill and satisfaction to the turn-based formula. The character designs, humor, and Steam Powered Giraffe soundtrack were also highlighted as major positives. The game holds a score of 86/100 on Metacritic for the Nintendo Switch version.

Sequel

A direct sequel, SteamWorld Heist II, was announced in April 2024 and released on August 8, 2024. The sequel is set on the "Great Sea" (a water-filled shard of Earth) and follows Captain Quincy Leeway—the son of a legendary hero—as he commands a submarine crew to solve a water crisis.

== Reception ==
Reception

Aggregate score
Aggregator	Score
Metacritic	3DS: 86/100; PC: 81/100; PS4: 83/100; VITA: 90/100; WIIU: 87/100 iOS: 90/100; NS: 91/100

Review scores
Publication	Score
Destructoid	8.5/10
Hardcore Gamer	4/5
IGN	8.8/10
Nintendo Life	9/10
Nintendo World Report	9.5/10
TouchArcade	iOS: 5/5
Daily Mirror	5/5

SteamWorld Heist has received positive reviews on all platforms, with current scores ranging from 81 to 91 on Metacritic.

Dave Rudden of IGN praised the game's depth, addictive combat and charming characters, though he lamented the lack of utilization of 3D effects in the 3DS version. Mitch Vogel of Nintendo Life praised the game's design and gameplay and considered the Nintendo Switch version the best version to play it.
