= Thunderful Group =

Swedish video game holding company

Thunderful Group AB
- Type: Subsidiary
- ISIN: SE0015195888
- Industry: Video games
- Predecessor: Thunderful AB
- Founded: December 2019; 6 years ago
- Headquarters: Gothenburg, Sweden
- Key people: Martin Walfisz (CEO)
- Number of employees: 329 (2024)
- Parent: Atari SA (2025–present)
- Subsidiaries: See § Operational groups
- Website: thunderfulgroup.com

Thunderful Group AB is a Swedish video game holding company based in Gothenburg and subsidiary of the Atari SA holding company. It was founded in December 2019 through a merger between Thunderful AB (Bergsala Holding's video game holding) and Bergsala Holding's distribution business, consisting of Bergsala, Amo Toys, and Nordic Game Supply.

The former Thunderful had been founded in December 2017 between Bergsala Holding, Brjánn Sigurgeirsson, and Klaus Lyngeled, incorporating Sigurgeirsson and Lyngeled's indie game studios—Image & Form and Zoink—and acquiring the publisher Rising Star Games from Bergsala Holding in July 2018. Thunderful Group has since acquired further developers, the publisher Headup Games, and the consultancy firm Robot Teddy. Atari acquired Thunderful in August 2025.

== History ==
Image & Form and Zoink, two independent video game developers based in Gothenburg, developed a close relationship through their founders and chief executive officers (CEOs), Brjánn Sigurgeirsson and Klaus Lyngeled, respectively, became "practically best friends". Although the two studios were separated by the Göta älv, Sigurgeirsson and Lyngeled met frequently due to the small size of Gothenburg's indie scene. Among other things, Image & Form and Zoink shared testing activities and marketing capabilities. In 2011, Bergsala Holding (the parent company of Bergsala, Nintendo's exclusive distribution partner in Sweden) acquired 50% of Image & Form. When Sigurgeirsson eventually introduced Lyngeled to the company, Bergsala Holding also acquired half of Zoink in 2014.

Sigurgeirsson, Lyngeled and Bergsala Holding decided to merge the two studios and created Thunderful as their parent company in December 2017. The company was jointly owned by the founding parties: Bergsala Holding held a 50% stake and Sigurgeirsson and Lyngeled 25% each. Sigurgeirsson and Lyngeled became the CEO and chief creative officer (CCO), respectively, of Thunderful, while both remained CEOs of their respective studios. The move was announced in January 2018, at which point Thunderful had 46 employees. Alongside the merger, a publishing arm called Thunderful Publishing AB was set up to handle third-party game publishing. Ed Valiente, the former business development manager for Nintendo of Europe, joined Thunderful as head of publishing in April 2018 and became the managing director for Thunderful Publishing. That July, Thunderful acquired Rising Star Games from Bergsala Holding. Valiente subsequently became the managing director for Rising Star Games, replacing the departing Martin Defries, while retaining his previous positions.

In December 2019, Bergsala Holding combined its distribution businesses—Bergsala, Amo Toys, and Nordic Game Supply—with Thunderful, creating the Thunderful Group. The new company was organised into three operational groups: Thunderful Development, containing Image & Form and Zoink; Thunderful Publishing, containing Thunderful Publishing AB and Rising Star Games; and Thunderful Distribution, containing Bergsala, Amo Toys, and Nordic Game Supply. The group remained under the shared ownership of Bergsala Holding, Sigurgeirsson and Lyngeled, and kept its headquarters in Gothenburg. Sigurgeirsson, who became Thunderful Group's CEO, stated that the merger was highly beneficial but evidenced that further financing was needed for future growth, leading Thunderful Group to eye an initial public offering (IPO). Bergsala, as the group's largest entity, was entirely dependent on its partnership with Nintendo at this time.

In February 2020, Thunderful Group acquired Guiding Rules Games AB (Guru Games), a developer based in Skövde. Through the buyout, Thunderful Games' employee count rose to 170. Later that year, Thunderful Group merged Image & Form, Zoink, and Guru Games to form Thunderful Development AB. Thunderful Development opened a fourth studio in Malmö that June. In September 2020, the company opened an online merch store. Thunderful Group acquired the British studio Coatsink for about £23 million in October 2020, followed by the Swedish developer Station Interactive AB (The Station) to undisclosed terms in November. Its 35 employees were transferred to Thunderful Development.

By November 2020, Thunderful Group was preparing an IPO via the Premier Growth Market of the Nasdaq First North, expecting to raise 750 million kr. The company began trading on 7 December 2020. In its 2020 fiscal year, the company recorded a 46% rise in revenues alongside a fall of net profit by 20%. Thunderful Group announced that it would acquire German publisher and developer Headup Games in February 2021 in a deal worth up to €11 million. With the acquisition, Headup's founder and managing director, Dieter Schoeller, is to become Thunderful Group's head of publishing. The acquisition was to close by 31 March 2021.

In August 2021, Thunderful Group acquired 91% of Jugo Mirkovic's development studio To the Sky for a symbolic fee, as well as the film studio Tussilago for 1 million kr. In September 2021, Thunderful Group acquired Madrid, Spain-based developer Stage Clear Studios in a deal worth up to €2.5 million. Alongside purchasing the consultancy firm Robot Teddy in October that year, Thunderful Group established Thunderful Investment and two funds, one for game prototypes and one for virtual reality games, as part of the Thunderful Games segment. In November, Thunderful acquired mobile game developer Early Morning Studio.

In November 2022, Thunderful acquired British developer Jumpship, creator of Somerville, for an undisclosed sum. On 17 January 2024 Thunderful cut 20% of its workforce, amounting to around 100 layoffs. In March 2024, the Thunderful Group announced its plan to divest HeadUp Games and later in April 2024, it was announced that Nordic Game Supply will also be divested.

In May 2024, Thunderful announced they would close Stage Clear Studios as part of a restructuring effort. It was also announced that Thunderful Group plans to divest the complete distribution business, which includes AMO Toys and Bergsala, to Bergsala NDP AB. The plan is to transform Thunderful Group into a company with focus on game development and game publishing.

Atari SA planned an 50 million kr investment into Thunderful in July 2025, which would give Atari around 82% of the controlling shares in the company. As part of this acquisition, Atari plans to restructure Thunderful and its five studios. Shareholders of Thunderful Group approved the acquisition by Atari SA on August 28, 2025, making Atari its majority shareholder. By 19 December, Atari's stake increased to 90.2%, and on 9 February 2026, Atari announced that Thunderful would be delisted from the Nasdaq First North.

== Operational groups ==
Thunderful Groups formerly had two operational groups: the distribution group containing the distribution businesses, and the games group covering the development, investment, and publishing of games. As of July 2024, the distribution business was divested, transforming the company into a "pure-play games company".

=== Current subsidiaries ===
- Development
  - Coatsink
  - Early Morning Studio
  - Thunderful Development AB
    - Thunderful Development Malmö
  - To the Sky
- Investment
  - Robot Teddy
- Publishing
  - Thunderful Games Limited
  - Thunderful Publishing AB

=== Former subsidiaries ===
- Stage Clear Studios (closed in 2024)
- Headup Games (sold in 2024)
- Nordic Game Supply (divested in 2024)
- Bergsala (sold in 2024)
- Amo Toys (sold in 2024)
- Studio Fizbin (closed in 2025)
- Jumpship (sold in 2025)
