= Blighted (video game) =

- Developer: DrinkBox Studios
- Publisher: DrinkBox Studios
- Producer: Graham Smith
- Composer: Jim Guthrie
- Platforms: Windows; Nintendo Switch 2
- Release: 2027
- Genre: Action role-playing
- Modes: Single-player, multiplayer

Blighted is an upcoming action role-playing video game developed and published by DrinkBox Studios. It is set to be released for Windows and Nintendo Switch 2 in 2027.

== Gameplay ==
Blighted is an action role-playing video game played from an isometric perspective. Throughout the game, the player character has to battle various enemies and creatures using a melee weapon or a firearm. Players can dodge or parry incoming attacks, which will lower enemies' stamina. If an enemy's stamina is fully depleted, they will be stunned, creating an opportunity for launching a counterattack. As players progress, they will defeat various bosses and acquire their abilities. Similar to Metroidvania games, players can unlock new shortcuts and access previously locked areas by learning new abilities. The game features a dynamic difficulty system that reacts to the player's gameplay performance. The aggressiveness of enemy behaviours will increase when the player is performing well. The game can be played solo or cooperatively with another player.

== Setting ==
According to DrinkBox Studios, the game is set within a "psychedelic Western nightmare". In the game, the player character must embark on a journey to defeat Sorcisto, a cannibalistic being who absorbed the memories and power of the deceased and unleashed a plague known as the Blight.

== Development ==
The game is currently being developed by DrinkBox Studios, the company behind Guacamelee!, Severed, and Nobody Saves the World. Jim Guthrie, which previously collaborated with the studio on Nobody Saves the World, will compose the game's soundtracks. While the game is played from an isometric perspective, Blighted is the studio's first 3D game. The dynamic difficulty system was designed to boost the game's challenge, particularly when the players are re-exploring areas and re-engaging enemies. The game was announced in June 2025, and was originally set to be released in late 2026 for Windows and Nintendo Switch 2, but got delayed to 2027.
