= The Game Awards 2016 =

2016 video game award show

- 2016 Logo used for The Game Awards
- Date: December 1, 2016
- Venue: Microsoft Theater, Los Angeles, United States
- Country: United States
- Hosted by: Geoff Keighley

Highlights
- Most awards: Overwatch (4)
- Most nominations: Uncharted 4: A Thief's End (8)
- Game of the Year: Overwatch
- Industry Icon Award: Hideo Kojima
- Website: thegameawards.com
- Viewership: 3.8 million

The Game Awards 2016 was an award show that honored the best video games of 2016. It was produced and hosted by Geoff Keighley at the Microsoft Theater in Los Angeles on December 1, 2016, and was live streamed across several platforms. During the event, Overwatch won Game of the Year, Blizzard Entertainment won Best Studio, and game designer Hideo Kojima was honored with the Industry Icon Award.

== Broadcast and viewership ==
The Game Awards broadcast was streamed on December 1, 2016 at 5:30 pm PST across several video sharing sites, including YouTube and Twitch, as well as on the gaming services Xbox Live, PlayStation Network, and Steam. For the first time, the YouTube stream included options for virtual reality and 4K resolution. Keighley and other event organizers worked with Tencent QQ to have the show livestreamed and translated for Chinese viewers using Tencent's QQ and WeChat clients, and to participate in the Fans Choice Awards; the two services combined had potential for more than 1.5 billion additional viewers. Keighley identified that with China's ban on video games having been lifted in 2015, it has become one of the fastest growing markets for video games, and obtained the Tencent deal was "really an experiment" to see how well the awards presentation would be taken there.

Keighley served at the host of the live event from the Microsoft Theater in Los Angeles. The event featured live performances by Run the Jewels, the Doom soundtrack by Mick Gordon, and Rae Sremmurd.

The event included new gameplay videos for several upcoming games. Prior to the event, Keighley stated that the show would have less reliance on computer generated (CGI) trailers and more on in-game footage, which was due to the effect of No Man's Sky's misleading marketing earlier in the year. Among games shown during the broadcast included Mass Effect: Andromeda, The Walking Dead: A New Frontier, Prey, The Legend of Zelda: Breath of the Wild, Shovel Knight: Specter of Torment, Halo Wars 2, Death Stranding, Dauntless from Phoenix Labs, a Bulletstorm remaster, Telltale's Guardians of the Galaxy, LawBreakers, Warframe, Assassin's Creed: The VR Experience, and clips from the 2016 Assassin's Creed film. Breath of the Wild was also featured in the pre-show.

With the addition of streaming to Asian audiences, the broadcast saw a total viewership of about 3.8 million, an increase of 65% from the 2015 show.

The show is infamous for its marketing tie-in with Schick razor blades. Hydrobot, a buff, humanoid robot with a razor blade head, appeared throughout the show and posed with game developer Hideo Kojima. The stunt was criticized for its commercialized nature.

== Winners and nominees ==
The nominees for The Game Awards 2016 were announced on November 16, 2016. Candidate games must have had a commercial release date on or before November 24, 2016, in order to be eligible. On November 21, The Game Awards dropped fangames AM2R and Pokémon Uranium from their "Best Fan Creation" nominee list. During a stream before the event, Keighley elaborated more on the situation and explained that the fangames were not legally cleared by Nintendo, who owns the rights to the intellectual property of both games, to be included on the show.

Most of the winners were announced during the awards ceremony on December 1, 2016 with the exception of the "Best Fan Creation" category. Winners are shown first in bold, and indicated with a double-dagger (‡) .

=== Jury-voted awards ===
| Game of the Year | Best Game Direction |
|---|---|
| **Overwatch – Blizzard Entertainment**‡; Doom – id Software; Inside – Playdead; Titanfall 2 – Respawn Entertainment; Uncharted 4: A Thief's End – Naughty Dog | **Overwatch – Blizzard Entertainment**‡; Battlefield 1 – EA DICE; Doom – id Software; Titanfall 2 – Respawn Entertainment; Uncharted 4: A Thief's End – Naughty Dog |
| Best Narrative | Best Art Direction |
| **Uncharted 4: A Thief's End – Naughty Dog**‡; Firewatch – Campo Santo; Inside – Playdead; Mafia III – Hangar 13; Oxenfree – Night School Studio | **Inside – Playdead**‡; Abzû – Giant Squid; Firewatch – Campo Santo; Overwatch – Blizzard Entertainment; Uncharted 4: A Thief's End – Naughty Dog |
| Best Music/Sound Design | Best Performance |
| **Doom – id Software**‡; Battlefield 1 – EA DICE; Inside – Playdead; Rez Infinite – United Game Artists; Thumper – Drool | **Nolan North as Nathan Drake – Uncharted 4: A Thief's End**‡; Alex Hernandez as Lincoln Clay – Mafia III; Cissy Jones as Delilah – Firewatch; Emily Rose as Elena Fisher – Uncharted 4: A Thief's End; Rich Sommer as Henry – Firewatch; Troy Baker as Sam Drake – Uncharted 4: A Thief's End |
| Games for Impact | Best Independent Game |
| **That Dragon, Cancer – Numinous Games**‡; Block'hood – Plethora Project; Orwell – Osmotic; Sea Hero Quest – Glitchers; 1979 Revolution: Black Friday – iNK Stories | **Inside – Playdead**‡; Firewatch – Campo Santo; Hyper Light Drifter – Heart Machine; Stardew Valley – ConcernedApe; The Witness – Thekla, Inc. |
| Best Mobile/Handheld Game | Best VR Game |
| **Pokémon Go – Niantic**‡; Clash Royale – Supercell; Fire Emblem Fates – Intelligent Systems; Monster Hunter Generations – Capcom; Severed – DrinkBox Studios | **Rez Infinite – United Game Artists**‡; Batman: Arkham VR – Rocksteady Studios; Eve: Valkyrie – CCP Games; Job Simulator – Owlchemy Labs; Thumper – Drool |
| Best Action Game | Best Action/Adventure |
| **Doom – id Software**‡; Battlefield 1 – EA DICE; Gears of War 4 – The Coalition; Overwatch – Blizzard Entertainment; Titanfall 2 – Respawn Entertainment | **Dishonored 2 – Arkane Studios**‡; Hitman – IO Interactive; Hyper Light Drifter – Heart Machine; Ratchet & Clank – Insomniac Games; Uncharted 4: A Thief's End – Naughty Dog |
| Best Role Playing Game | Best Fighting Game |
| **The Witcher 3: Wild Hunt – Blood and Wine – CD Projekt Red**‡; Dark Souls III – FromSoftware; Deus Ex: Mankind Divided – Eidos Montréal; World of Warcraft: Legion – Blizzard Entertainment; Xenoblade Chronicles X – Monolith Soft | **Street Fighter V – Capcom**‡; Killer Instinct Season Three – Iron Galaxy; The King of Fighters XIV – SNK; Pokkén Tournament – Bandai Namco Studios |
| Best Strategy Game | Best Family Game |
| **Civilization VI – Firaxis Games**‡; Fire Emblem Fates – Intelligent Systems; The Banner Saga 2 – Stoic; Total War: Warhammer – Creative Assembly; XCOM 2 – Firaxis Games | **Pokémon Go – Niantic**‡; Dragon Quest Builders – Square Enix; Lego Star Wars: The Force Awakens – TT Fusion; Ratchet & Clank – Insomniac Games; Skylanders: Imaginators – Toys for Bob |
| Best Sports/Racing Game | Best Multiplayer |
| **Forza Horizon 3 – Playground Games**‡; FIFA 17 – EA Canada; MLB The Show 16 – San Diego Studio; NBA 2K17 – Visual Concepts; Pro Evolution Soccer 2017 – PES Productions | **Overwatch – Blizzard Entertainment**‡; Battlefield 1 – EA DICE; Gears of War 4 – The Coalition; Overcooked – Ghost Town Games; Titanfall 2 – Respawn Entertainment; Tom Clancy's Rainbow Six Siege – Ubisoft Montreal |

=== Fan's choice awards ===
| Most Anticipated Game | Trending Gamer |
|---|---|
| **The Legend of Zelda: Breath of the Wild – by Nintendo EPD**‡; God of War – by Santa Monica Studio; Horizon Zero Dawn – by Guerrilla Games; Mass Effect: Andromeda – by BioWare; Red Dead Redemption 2 – by Rockstar Games | **Boogie2988**‡; AngryJoeShow; Danny O'Dwyer; JackSepticEye; Lirik |
| Best Fan Creation | Esports Player of the Year |
| **Enderal: The Shards of Order**‡; Brutal Doom 64; ~~AM2R~~ (Note: Nomination removed following a DMCA takedown notice by Nintendo); ~~Pokémon Uranium~~ | **Marcelo "coldzera" David (SK Gaming – Counter-Strike: Global Offensive)**‡; Lee "Faker" Sang-hyeok (SK Telecom T1 – League of Legends); Hyun "ByuN" Woo (StarCraft II); Lee "Infiltration" Seon-woo (Team Razer – Street Fighter V); Juan "Hungrybox" Debiedma (Team Liquid – Super Smash Bros. Melee) |
| Esports Team of the Year | Esports Game of the Year |
| **Cloud9**‡; SK Telecom T1; Wings Gaming; SK Gaming; ROX Tigers | **Overwatch – Blizzard Entertainment**‡; Counter-Strike: Global Offensive – Valve; Dota 2 – Valve; League of Legends – Riot Games; Street Fighter V – Capcom |

=== Honorary awards ===
Industry Icon Award
- **Hideo Kojima**‡

== Games with multiple nominations and awards ==
Multiple nominations
| Nominations | Game |
|---|---|
| 8 | Uncharted 4: A Thief's End |
| 6 | Overwatch |
| 5 | Firewatch |
| 5 | Inside |
| 4 | Battlefield 1 |
| 4 | Doom |
| 4 | Titanfall 2 |
| 2 | Fire Emblem Fates |
| 2 | Gears of War 4 |
| 2 | Hyper Light Drifter |
| 2 | Mafia III |
| 2 | Pokémon Go |
| 2 | Ratchet & Clank |
| 2 | Rez Infinite |
| 2 | Street Fighter V |
| 2 | Thumper |

Multiple awards
| Awards | Game |
|---|---|
| 4 | Overwatch |
| 2 | Doom |
| 2 | Inside |
| 2 | Pokémon Go |
| 2 | Uncharted 4: A Thief's End |
