= Hyper Light Breaker =

2025 roguelike video game

- Developer: Heart Machine
- Publisher: Arc Games
- Director: Alx Preston
- Composers: Troupe Gammage; Joel Corelitz
- Engine: Unreal Engine 4
- Platform: Windows
- Release: January 14, 2025 (early access); Cancelled (full release)
- Genre: Roguelike
- Modes: Single-player, multiplayer

Hyper Light Breaker is a roguelike video game developed by Heart Machine and published by Arc Games. It serves as the prequel to Hyper Light Drifter (2016). The player controls a "Breaker" who ventures into the Overgrowth to defeat the Abyss King. The game released for early access on January 14, 2025. The full release was scheduled for 2026, though development of the game stopped in October 2025 after Heart Machine had layoffs.

== Gameplay ==
Breaker takes place from a third-person perspective, and the player can mix melee and ranged weapons together. Each "Breaker" can choose a class and abilities that affect gameplay. To traverse the world, Breakers can use hoverboards, gliders and climb walls. Like in other roguelikes, when the player dies, a new world is randomly generated. The game supports multiplayer, with up to three players able to join a world together. To win, the player needs to take down a series of regional bosses in order to fight the Abyss King. Between runs, the player can explore a hub city.

Non-playable characters can be found throughout the world, and the player can converse with them. Like in Hyper Light Drifter, there is no spoken dialogue in the game, instead characters communicate information to the player through comic book panels.

== Development ==
Originally each biome was intended to be a separate level, but due to the amount of work required to expand each, all were consolidated into a single world. Many of the game's systems are built upon those created for the studio's previous title Solar Ash.

Gearbox Publishing San Francisco was originally listed as the publisher prior to its rebrand as Arc Games following Gearbox Software's sale to Take-Two Interactive.

The game's early access release was originally scheduled for late 2023, but following multiple delays, the game released in early access on January 14, 2025. A full release of the game was scheduled for 2026, but the studio underwent a layoff and ended development of the game in October 2025, leaving the game's future in question.
