= Teddy Dief =

American video game developer

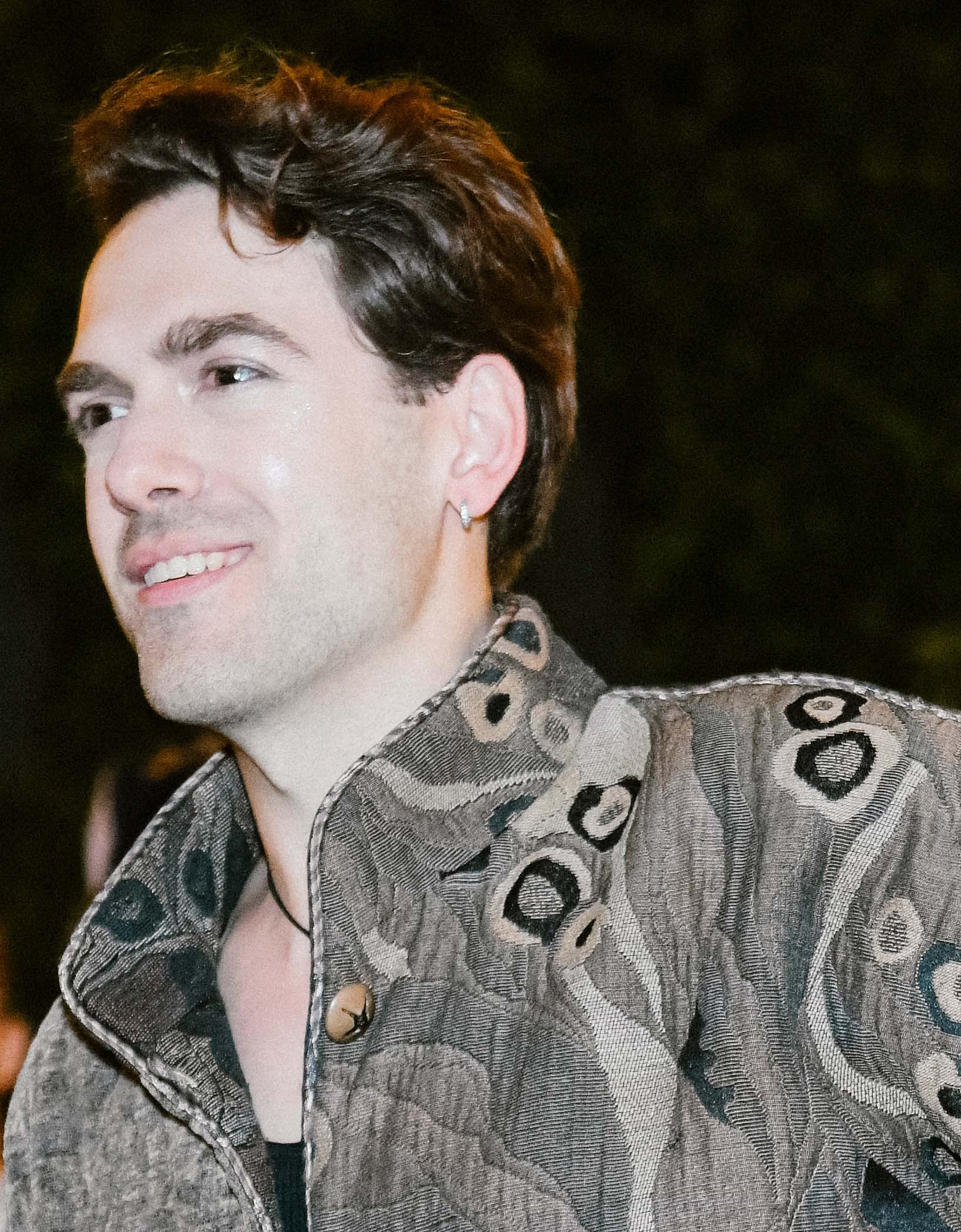
- Dief at the We Are OFK premier in 2022
- Occupations: Game designer, creative director, writer
- Notable work: Hyper Light Drifter; We Are OFK

Teddy Diefenbach, also known as Teddy Dief, is an American videogame designer and writer. They worked as a creative director at Square Enix Montreal, directed the game We Are OFK, and was co-designer for the game Hyper Light Drifter. They co-founded the artist collective Glitch City and participate in a yearly charity live-stream called Chocobowl.

== Biography ==
Dief studied at Columbia University and for a graduate degree in film and television production at the University of Southern California's School of Cinematic Arts.

Dief developed Kyoto Wild for PC as a solo project. In 2013 they joined Heart Machine to work on the role playing game Hyper Light Drifter.

Dief left Heart Machine in May 2016 and started work as the creative director of Square Enix Montreal. During this period, they were reportedly working on a game project with Fez programmer Renaud Bédard for two years. On January 29, 2018, Dief announced their resignation after Square Enix shelved the project, citing the company's shift in business strategy. Dief stated that this development marked their return to "full-time indie development".

Dief was the creative director of We Are OFK, a videogame released in 2022 about the origin story of a virtual band called OFK. According to Dief, it is an actual music project and consists of five episodes.

Aside from their design work for several games, Dief also worked as a writer, voice actor, and musician. In We are OFK, Dief provided the voice for the character Luca Le Fae.

== Philanthropy ==
Dief is involved in several gaming initiatives. Together with Alex Preston, Beau Blyth, and Samurai Gunn, they co-created Glitch City, a Los Angeles-based game makers and independent artists collective. In 2015, they co-founded Chocobowl, a 48-hour live stream that involves game developers playing Japanese role-playing games (JRPGs). Chocobowl has since been used as a platform to raise money for organizations such AbleGamers and The Bail Project.

== Game credits ==
- 2022 - We Are OFK (Director, Co-Writer)
- 2016 - Hyper Light Drifter (Designer, Coder)
- 2016 - Fitz Packerton (Game Designer)
- 2014 - Kyoto Wild (Game Designer)
- 2012 - Shove Pro (Game Designer)
- 2011 - Jumpkick Justice (Game Designer)

Other Credits

- 2024 - Another Crab's Treasure (Special Thanks)
- 2024 - Pacific Drive (Narrative Scripting Assistance)
- 2021 - Solar Ash (Special Thanks)
- 2020 - Bugsnax (Special Thanks)
- 2017 - Dream Daddy: A Dad Dating Simulator (Special Thanks)
- 2017 - Night in the Woods (Special Thanks)
- 2016 - Quadrilateral Cowboy (Special Thanks)
- 2014 - Nidhogg (Special Thanks)

== Awards and nominations ==
Date	Award / Publication	Category	Work	Result	Ref.
December 1, 2016	The Game Awards	Best Independent Game	Hyper Light Drifter (Note: Co-nominated with Alx Preston, Beau Blyth, Casey Hunt, Sean Ward, Richard Vreeland, Akash Thakkar, Cosimo Galluzzi, Prof Brown)	Nominated	
December 1, 2016	The Game Awards	Best Action/Adventure	Hyper Light Drifter	Nominated	
February 23, 2017	D.I.C.E. Awards	Role-Playing Game of the Year	Hyper Light Drifter	Nominated	
March 1, 2017	Game Developers Choice Awards	Best Debut	Hyper Light Drifter	Nominated	
March 1, 2017	Independent Games Festival	Excellence In Visual Art	Hyper Light Drifter	Won	
March 1, 2017	Independent Games Festival	Audience Award	Hyper Light Drifter	Won	
March 22, 2023	Independent Games Festival	Excellence In Audio	We Are OFK (Note: Co-nominated with Mikayla Foote, Jarryd Huntley, Adriel Wallick, Kezia Adamo, Claire Jia, Jenny Yu, Nafisah Tung, Killian Ng, Taylor Reynolds, DeVon Beasley, Jane Kim, Chelsea Hash, Akash Thakkar, omniboi, Khris Brown, Ally Maki, Fiona Rene, Syhaya Aviel, Deedee Magno, Erika Ishii, Greg Chun, Kaiji Tang, Kimberly Brooks, Krizia Bajos, Miguel Angel Caballero, Sara Amini, Yuri Lowenthal, Luna Shadows, Thomas Powers, Nicole Brady, Chelsea Blecha, Charles Hilton, Kat Tsai, Henry Wong, Elora Pautrat, Jack Covell, David Reynolds, Beatriz Artola, Jorel Corpus, Jett Galindo)	Nominated	
March 22, 2023	Game Developers Choice Awards	Social Impact	We Are OFK	Nominated	
June 9, 2024	Peabody Awards	Interactive & Immersive	We Are OFK	Won	
