= Hyper Light Drifter =

2016 action role-playing video game

- Developers: Heart Machine; Abylight Studios (Switch, mobile)
- Publishers: Heart Machine; Abylight Studios (Switch, mobile)
- Designers: Alx Preston; Beau Blyth; Teddy Dief; Casey Hunt
- Programmers: Beau Blyth; Teddy Dief
- Artists: Alx Preston; Sean Ward
- Writer: Casey Hunt
- Composers: Disasterpeace; Akash Thakkar
- Engine: GameMaker Studio
- Platforms: Linux, Windows, OS X, PlayStation 4, Xbox One, Nintendo Switch, iOS, Android
- Release: Linux, OS X, Windows; March 31, 2016; PS4, Xbox One; July 26, 2016; Switch; September 6, 2018; iOS; July 25, 2019; Android; June 17, 2024
- Genre: Action role-playing
- Modes: Single-player, multiplayer

Hyper Light Drifter is an action role-playing game developed and published by Heart Machine. The Microsoft Windows, Linux and OS X versions were released in March 2016, and the PlayStation 4 and Xbox One versions in July 2016. A Special Edition port of the game, featuring additional content, was released by Abylight Studios for the Nintendo Switch in September 2018, for iOS devices in July 2019 and for Android devices in June 2024.

The game pays homage to 8-bit and 16-bit games, and is considered by its lead developer Alx Preston as a combination of The Legend of Zelda: A Link to the Past and Diablo. Preston originally launched Kickstarter funding for the title for approximately US$27,000 to develop the title for Microsoft Windows, OS X, and Linux computers, but ended up with more than US$600,000, allowing him to hire more programmers and artists, and expanding the title for console and portable platforms through stretch goals. Though originally scoped for release in 2014, various improvements in the game and issues with Preston's health set the release back.

The game received generally positive reviews upon release. A prequel, Hyper Light Breaker, entered early access on January 14, 2025.

== Gameplay and story ==
When conversing with the inhabitants of the world, the player sees images in place of dialogue.

Hyper Light Drifter is a 2D action role-playing game fashioned after The Legend of Zelda: A Link to the Past, rendered in a pixel art style. The player controls the Drifter, a character that has access to technology that has long been forgotten by the inhabitants of the game's world and is suffering from an unspecified illness. The story concept was inspired by lead developer Alx Preston's heart disease, and has been likened by others to Studio Ghibli's Castle in the Sky, while Preston cites the studio's Nausicaä of the Valley of the Wind as inspiration for the game's world.

The Drifter is equipped with a phase-shifted hard light energy sword and can gain access to other modules that expand their weapon and ability arsenal. These often require power from rare batteries scattered around the world. Weaponry includes long-range guns and area attacks. Rather than scavenging ammunition from the game world to load the player's guns, the player's ammunition instead charges when hitting enemies and objects with the energy sword. The player faces increasingly difficult monsters, both in number and ability, requiring the player to hone their tactics to succeed in the game. Preston's goal was to replicate the experience of playing on the SNES, noting that the unit had "amazing, almost perfect games designed for limited environments" which he challenged himself to simulate in Hyper Light Drifter. One feature of SNES games that Preston captured is that there is no spoken dialogue, placing more emphasis on the game's music and visuals to tell a story.

== Development ==
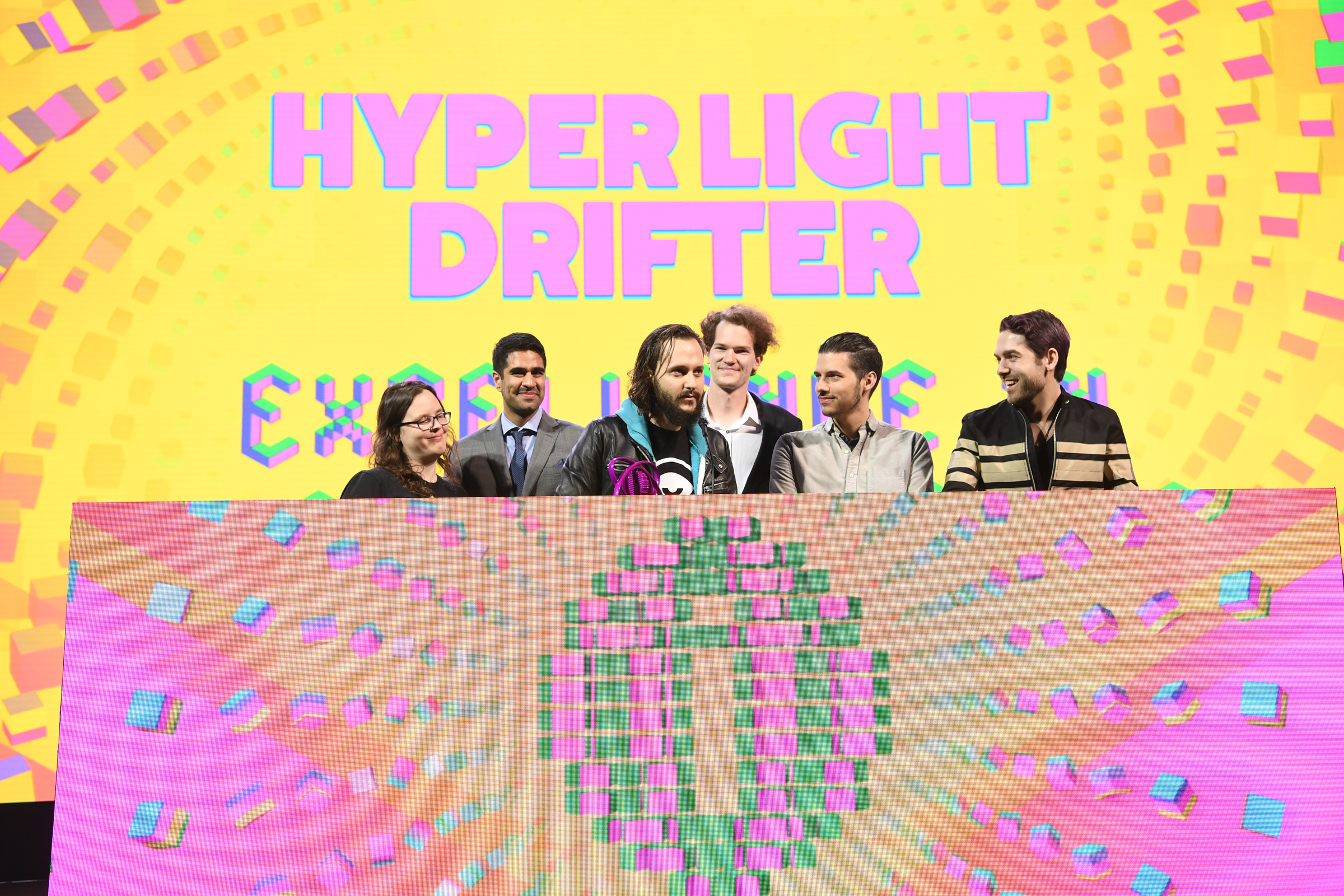
The Heart Machine team winning the Independent Games Festival award for Excellence in Visual Art. Alx Preston is third from left.

Hyper Light Drifter is primarily based on the vision of its key developer Alx Preston. Preston had been born with congenital heart disease, and throughout his life has been hospitalized with digestive and immune-system issues relating to this condition. While in college, Preston had used the mediums of painting and film to illustrate his experiences with frail health and near-death conditions.

Preston envisioned Hyper Light Drifter as a video game as a means "to tell a story [he] can identify with, expressing something personal to a larger audience, so [he feels] more connected and have an outlet for the many emotions that crop up around life-altering issues". Further, he had yearned to develop a game that combined the best elements of The Legend of Zelda: A Link to the Past and Diablo for many years, which would feature world exploration and combat that required some strategy by the player, depending on foes they faced. After several years of being an animator, he felt he could do so in 2013. The theme and story for the game, featuring a protagonist suffering from a terminal disease, is meant as a simile for his own health.

Preston originally set out to make the game for Windows, OS X, and Linux computers and started a Kickstarter campaign in September 2013 to secure US$27,000 in funding to complete the title. Prior to starting the campaign, Preston had secured the help of programmer Beau Blyth who created titles like Samurai Gunn, and musician Disasterpeace, who worked on the music for Fez. In a 2017 interview on the podcast The Futur, Alx noted that Kanye West offered to collaborate on the soundtrack of Hyper Light Drifter, but refused as Disasterpeace had already been secured to compose. He opted to develop the game under the studio name Heart Machine as an allegory for the various medical devices he often needs to track his own health, and to use for future projects following Hyper Light Drifter.

The project funding was exceeded in a day, and quickly grew over US$100,000 within a few days of its launch. To encourage additional funding, Preston created new stretch goals, including additional gameplay modes, more bosses and characters, and expanding the release to include the PlayStation 4 and Vita, the Ouya, and the Wii U consoles. These goals were all met by the completion of the campaign, with more than US$640,000 raised. Preston stated that he had had these additional platforms in mind when first launching the Kickstarter, but did not want to over-promise what he felt he could deliver. The additional funds helped Preston to grow the core development team, with the addition of game designer Teddy Dief, who would go on to create titles like We Are OFK, artist Casey Hunt, and animator Sean Ward. Preston was also able to hire additional developers to aid in porting the game to these additional consoles.

The game was originally set for release in mid-2014 but was delayed until the second quarter of 2016, due to the expanded scope of the game, the need to perfect the game before its first release, and the lead developer's health issues. Preston found help from several developer friends around the Los Angeles area. He and a number of people worked together to build out Glitch Space, a small open office space for small developers to work from and share ideas with others. Besides his own team, Preston got frequent help from developers Ben Esposito (Donut County), Brendon Chung (Blendo Games), and Ben Vance. Preston was also encouraged by letters of support he got from people across the world after reporting on some of his health conditions. The letters influenced Preston to alter the story in Hyper Light Drifter as to not make it about a problem facing a single character but something shared by many.

The most recent delay was announced in August 2015, Heart Machine said that they will plan to release the Windows and OS X version first with the console versions shortly thereafter once they clear the console certification processes. The Windows and OS X versions were released on March 31, 2016. The PlayStation 4 and Xbox One versions were released on July 26, 2016. In February 2016, Heart Machine revealed that there were contractual issues at the time between Nintendo and YoYo Games, the developer of the GameMaker: Studio engine, that was beyond their control that may prevent the game from being ported to the Wii U, and while they hoped they can offer for this platform at the end, they have considered the Wii U version "in limbo."

Several patches have been applied to the game since its initial release. One of these patches made the game slightly easier, in response to feedback about the game's difficulty. This patch made a number of minor changes to the game, most notable of which was the addition of a brief period of invincibility when the player uses the Dash mechanic. The reduction in difficulty led to debate within the game's fan community, split between those who liked the new patch, and those who preferred the old, more challenging version. Three days after this patch, the developers re-balanced the game to add back some of the difficulty.

A mode featuring two-player co-op gameplay was planned during the initial development of the game and was intended to be a feature at launch, but it was cut due to time constraints. On April 27, a beta version of the co-op mode was released. An update that went live on May 5 fully implemented the co-op multiplayer feature in the game.

In September 2016, Preston announced that they had to cancel the planned Wii U and PlayStation Vita versions, offering those backers the ability to redeem the game on another system or be refunded if desired. Preston cited issues with rebuilding the game from the ground up on these systems due to issues with GameMaker Studio on these platforms, noting that it took six months to get the game ported to PlayStation and Xbox. Preston also had further concerns on his own health, putting his well-being as a priority.

After Preston's announcement, Abylight Studios got in contact with him to help, which resulted in the collaboration between Heart Machine and Abylight Studios for an adaptation and publication of Hyper Light Drifter for the Nintendo Switch. Abylight Studios worked closely with YoYo Games, the developer of the game development software GameMaker Studio, which was used to create Hyper Light Drifter. On September 6, 2018, Hyper Light Drifter: Special Edition was launched for the Nintendo Switch featuring exclusive content, such as the Tower Climb challenge, a bonus boss, two extra weapons and an extra outfit.

The Special Edition was ported to iOS devices with 120 fps gameplay on iPad Pro and 60 fps on both iPhone and iPad, and released on July 25, 2019. The Hyper Light Drifter: Special Edition Collector's Set for Nintendo Switch, which includes the physical copy of the game and other collectible items, was announced for pre-order by Abylight Studios in December 2020 and started shipment in January 2021.

== Reception ==
Reception

Aggregate score
Aggregator	Score
Metacritic	PC: 84/100; PS4: 80/100; XONE: 76/100; NS: 88/100 iOS: 84/100

Review scores
Publication	Score
Destructoid	9/10
Eurogamer	4/5
Game Informer	9.5/10
GameSpot	9/10
Hardcore Gamer	4.5/5
IGN	7.6/10
PC Gamer (US)	78/100
Polygon	8.5/10
TouchArcade	5/5
The Escapist	5/5

Hyper Light Drifter received "generally favorable reviews", according to the review aggregator platform Metacritic. Praise was given to the game's visuals, sound design and combat mechanics, while criticism was directed towards the difficult boss fights. Kyle Hilliard of Game Informer wrote that the game "has already positioned itself as one of the best experiences of the year." Brandin Tyrrel of IGN called the game a "gorgeous, trendy hunk of stylish old-school sensibilities mated with the iconic hues of pixelated indie charm." Christian Donlan of Eurogamer praised the game's "intoxicating" atmosphere, as well as Disasterpeace's "typical delight" of a soundtrack.

Kevin VanOrd of GameSpot cites the game's art direction as "rich and thoughtful," and comments on its "fluid, demanding, and fair" combat system. TouchArcade liked the mobile port's use of haptic feedback, writing, "I don't think I've played a game that has implemented haptic vibration this well on iOS". Wired praised the themes of the story, "the drifter's lonely journey is equal parts Robert Heinlein and Akira Kurosawa". Destructoid enjoyed the stylized pixel art, writing, "The visual presentation of Hyper Light Drifter is second to none".

Mixed criticism commonly falls upon the minimalism of the game's storytelling method. Tyrrel alleges its "abstract storytelling" is a negative aspect, while Griffin McElroy of Polygon claims that the game's story is replaced with "moods", and "quiet moments with constant scenes of breakneck, pitch-perfect action". PC Gamer liked the game's combat, but criticized the storytelling as well, "This minimalist approach gives it an air of intriguing mystery, but it can also make it feel aimless".

=== Accolades ===
Year	Award	Category	Result	Ref.
2016	Independent Games Festival Awards 2016	Excellence in Visual Art	Nominated	
2016	Golden Joystick Awards 2016	Best Original Game	Nominated	
2016	Golden Joystick Awards 2016	Best Visual Design	Nominated	
2016	Golden Joystick Awards 2016	Best Audio	Nominated	
2016	Golden Joystick Awards 2016	Best Indie Game	Nominated	
2016	The Game Awards 2016	Best Independent Game	Nominated	
2016	The Game Awards 2016	Best Action/Adventure Game	Nominated	
2016	Giant Bomb's 2016 Game of the Year Awards	Best Game	Nominated	
2016	Independent Games Festival	Seumas McNally Grand Prize	Nominated	
2016	Independent Games Festival	Excellence in Audio	Nominated	
2016	Independent Games Festival	Excellence in Visual Art	Won	
2016	Independent Games Festival	Audience Award	Won	
2017	20th Annual D.I.C.E. Awards	Role-Playing/Massively Multiplayer Game of the Year	Nominated	
2017	17th Game Developers Choice Awards	Best Debut	Nominated	
2017	SXSW Gaming Awards	Most Fulfilling Community-Funded Game	Nominated	
2017	SXSW Gaming Awards	Excellence in Musical Score	Nominated	
2019	Apple, Inc. Awards	iPad Game of the Year	Won	

== Legacy ==
Heart Machine's next game, Solar Ash (originally announced as Solar Ash Kingdom), was announced in March 2019, and is set in the same universe as Hyper Light Drifter though not as a direct sequel. The game was published by Annapurna Interactive and was released on PlayStation 5, PlayStation 4, and Microsoft Windows in December 2021.

In March 2022, another follow-up game that was set in the same universe as the other games but is also not a sequel titled Hyper Light Breaker was announced. The game is published by Gearbox Publishing and has been released in early access in January 2025. The game features single-player and cooperative online multiplayer gameplay set in a 3D world.

The Drifter is a playable character in the games Runbow and Brawlout, as well as in the upcoming game Hex Heroes. The Drifter will also be added as an expansion character in the board game Kingdom Death: Monster. Hyper Light Drifter is also featured on one of the clothing options for Travis Touchdown in Travis Strikes Again: No More Heroes.

On November 22nd, 2021, Hyper Light Drifter crossed over with Dead Cells, in which The Drifter's signature sword and gun were added as weapons, as well as two wearable outfits referencing The Drifter.

=== Animated limited television series ===
A limited animated television series based on Hyper Light Drifter was announced in March 2019 by Preston and Adi Shankar, who had helped lead adaptions of the current Castlevania and Devil May Cry series. The two are currently writing scripts for the episodes and developing the series. They plan to retain elements of the game's pixel art style and borrow from anime influences.
