= Tales from Space: Mutant Blobs Attack =

2014 side-scrolling platform video game

- Developer: DrinkBox Studios
- Publisher: Drinkbox Studios
- Series: Tales from Space
- Platforms: Linux, Microsoft Windows, Nintendo Switch, OS X, PlayStation 3, PlayStation Vita, Xbox 360
- Release: PlayStation Vita: NA: February 21, 2012; EU: February 22, 2012; Microsoft Windows; August 15, 2012; PlayStation 3: NA: June 17, 2014; EU: June 18, 2014; Xbox 360; June 18, 2014; Nintendo Switch; May 10, 2019
- Genre: 2D platformer
- Mode: Single-player

Tales from Space: Mutant Blobs Attack is a side-scrolling platform video game, released on February 21, 2012, as a launch title of the PlayStation Vita. It was developed and published by DrinkBox Studios. It is the sequel to Tales from Space: About a Blob. Mutant Blobs Attack was later released for Microsoft Windows computers, with versions for PlayStation 3 and Xbox 360 released in June 2014.

The game is about a grumpy mutant Blob that escapes into the world and starts eating everything around it. Mutant Blobs Attack features new levels, new powers and controls, and a new Blob player character.

== Gameplay ==
In Mutant Blobs Attack the player controls a gelatinous mutant Blob. The player can grow by eating loose objects in the game environment. Over the course of each level, the player encounters a series of obstacles they must grow large enough to bypass. The game combines traditional 2D thumbstick-based platforming controls with touch-based powers and abilities. Physics-based puzzles are often mixed in with the action.

== Reception ==
Tales from Space: Mutant Blobs Attack was received positively by critics. IGN gave a score of 9 out of 10, saying "Tales from Space: Mutant Blobs Attack stole my heart." GameZone scored it 9.5 out of 10, saying "One of the PS Vita's first downloadable games turns out to be a must have for the system. As of 22 February, Metacritic showed that the game is the second best rated out of the 30 Vita games, with a score of 87%.

Digital Trends named Mutant Blobs Attack the Best Handheld Game of 2012. Mutant Blobs Attack also appeared in several "Best of 2012" lists, including "Handheld of the Year 2012" from GamesRadar, "Best Indie games of 2012" from VentureBeat, and "Top 50 Games of 2012" from Game Informer. Mutant Blobs Attack was nominated for "Best PlayStation Vita Network Game" at IGN, losing to Super Stardust Delta, but claiming the People's Choice Award in the category.
