= Noclip =

Crowdfunded media company

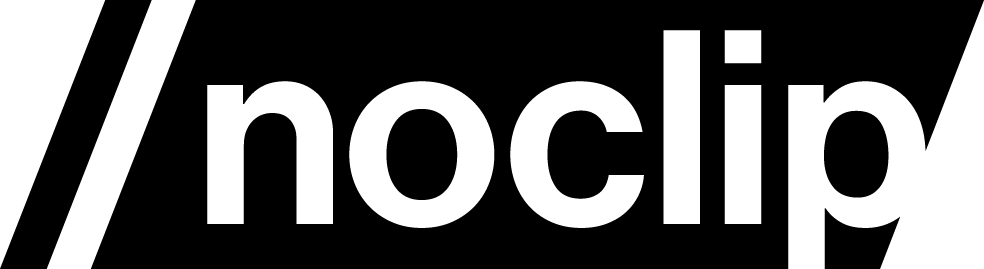

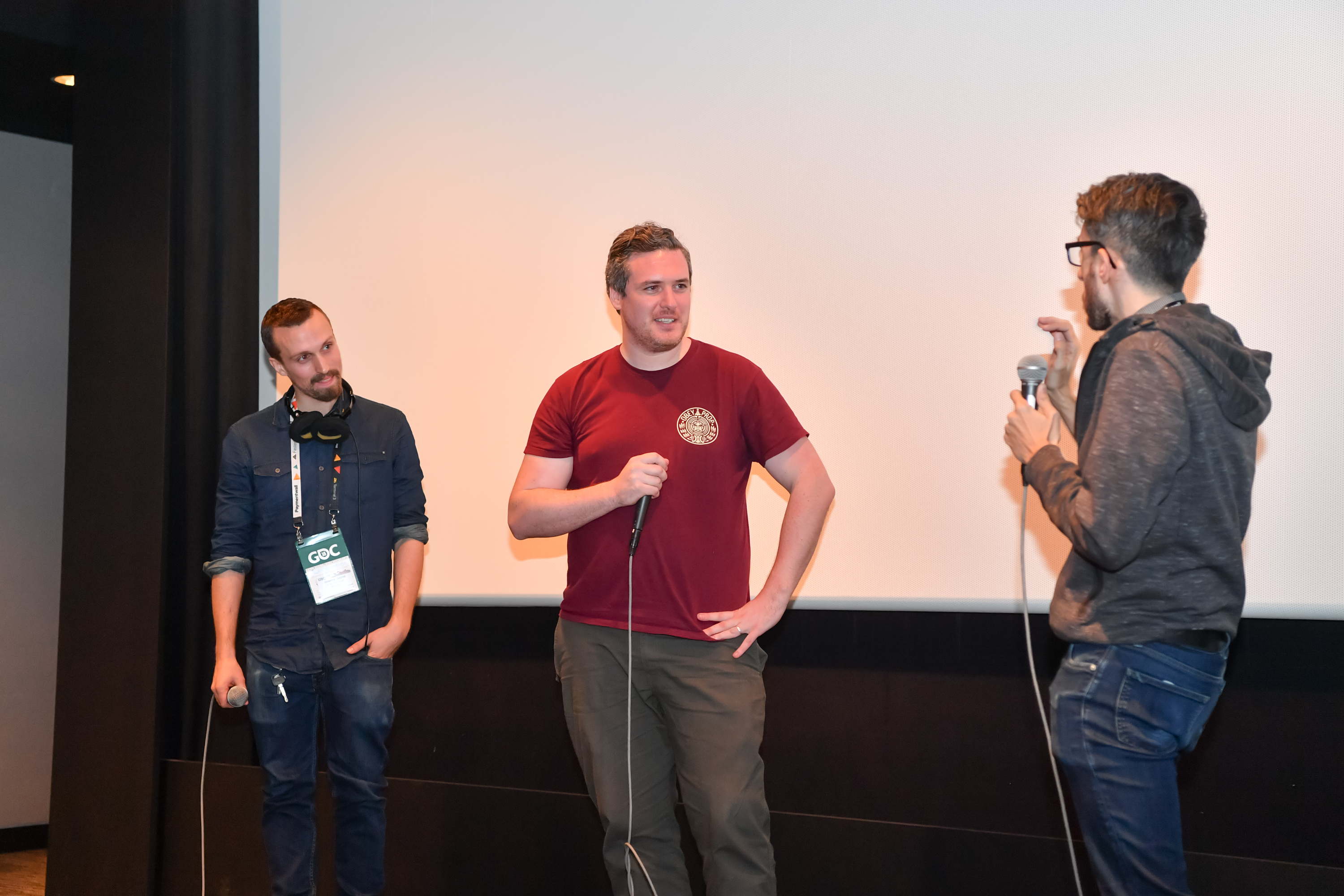
- Danny O'Dwyer (centre) talks about Noclip at the 2018 GDC Film Festival.
- Type: Media company
- Industry: Crowdfunded documentaries
- Founded: 2016
- Founder: Danny O'Dwyer

Noclip is a crowdfunded media company dedicated to creating video game documentaries and archiving video game media. It was founded by Danny O'Dwyer, an Irish video game journalist and documentary producer, in 2016, and is solely funded via Patreon donations.

== History ==
Prior to starting Noclip, O'Dwyer gained recognition through his work as a host and producer on the video game website GameSpot, where he hosted shows including Escape from Mount Stupid, Random Encounter, The Point and The Lobby. He was nominated as Trending Gamer of the Year at The Game Awards 2016.

On September 5, 2016, O'Dwyer created the YouTube channel for Noclip, releasing a trailer on September 12, 2016. In it, he says that "gamers deserve a media that reflects our passions, a press that uses its access to tell stories about how games get made, the people who play them, and the ways in which they affect our lives—stories that make us proud to be gamers." The company's name comes from "noclip mode", a video game cheat that allows players to pass through walls. O'Dwyer said: "With [Noclip] we're going to walk through gaming's walls and take a peek at the other side."

O'Dwyer was inspired to use crowd-funding instead of the traditional advertising model of most video game websites because he believes that a focus on clicks has influenced the quality of games journalism. In a December 2016 video he said, "I want the only thing to matter about games coverage to be the quality of the videos, the quality of the work." Noclip was launched via a Patreon campaign and is supported solely through crowdfunding; in 2019 more than 5,000 patrons were donating over US$23,000 per month.

O'Dwyer was contacted by a San Francisco–based media company in 2023 about a number of video tapes the company were about to dispose of. O'Dwyer recovered the boxes, finding they contained numerous video game media spanning the late 1990s to 2010, such as E3 conferences, game trailers, and footage of early game releases, most which had not previously been available on YouTube or other video sites. O'Dwyer and others with Noclip began a project to digitally capture the tapes and made them available through Noclip's YouTube channel and the Internet Archive.

== Documentaries ==
When filming documentaries, Noclip require that subjects have no control over the final documentary, giving the creators the ability to create a documentary free of the subject's influence. O'Dwyer takes a laid back approach when interviewing subjects, encouraging them to be relaxed and open up about the topic of discussion. Noclip documentaries do not run advertisements, with crowdfunding being the only source of income.

Noclip's first project provided viewers with insight into Rocket League – the game was chosen as a deliberate middle-point between large AAA studios and indie games. The second project covered a history of Doom, revealing some previously unreleased footage from Doom 4. Other documentary subjects have included Final Fantasy XIV, Horizon Zero Dawn, GOG.com, The Witcher 3: Wild Hunt, Astroneer, Hades and the games of Bethesda Game Studios, Arkane Studios, Jonathan Blow, John Romero, and Brendan Greene.
