= Heart Machine =

American video game development studio

- Type: Private
- Industry: Video games
- Founded: 2013; 13 years ago
- Founder: Alx Preston
- Headquarters: Culver City, California, United States
- Products: Hyper Light Drifter; Solar Ash
- Website: heartmachine.com

Heart Machine, Inc. is an American independent video game development studio founded by Alx Preston. The studio is best known for developing Hyper Light Drifter (2016) and Solar Ash (2021).

== History ==
The studio was founded by Preston in 2013 to support development of Hyper Light Drifter, a game that he was leading the development of during a crowdfunding campaign. The name Heart Machine draws from various medical conditions related to congenital heart disease that Preston had suffered and which were also inspirations for Hyper Light Drifter.

With Hyper Light Drifter far exceeding its crowdfunding goals, Preston established Heart Machine in Glitch Space, an open co-operative office area he had previously helped establish in Culver City, California, for other independent developers. Hyper Light Drifter was released in 2016 to generally positive reviews and received several gaming award nominations.

The studio announced its next title, Solar Ash, in March 2019, to be published on Windows by Annapurna Interactive. According to Preston, the studio had been working on Solar Ash for some time after finishing up release on Hyper Light Drifter, and the new game includes "a whole new set of incredible tech and key innovations". It is said to be set in the same universe as Hyper Light Drifter but is not a direct sequel to that game. Alx Preston is once again acting as the main designer, with Zoë Quinn writing for the narrative. Rich Vreeland (Disasterpeace) is slated to return to compose music for it. For the new game, Heart Machine has decided to abandon the 2D pixel art style and instead opt for a more open 3D world with a third-person camera view of the player character, although they have tried to retain the original game world's aesthetic and translated it to the new style. Preston has said that console releases are in the works as well. An introduction trailer was revealed in June 2020 at the PS5 digital showcase. The game was released on December 2, 2021.

On March 31, 2022, Heart Machine revealed their next game Hyper Light Breaker, originally set to release in 2023. The soundtrack is expected to be handled by the studio's audio team and Disasterpeace isn't set to return this time around. Hyper Light Breaker's release date was delayed to 2024, with the announcement on March 22, 2023 stating "additional time to focus on Hyper Light Breaker’s development will allow us to bring the game to its full potential". Arc Games, formerly Gearbox Publishing San Francisco, is set to publish the game.

On June 7, 2024, Heart Machine revealed their new title, Possesor(s), a 2D sidescrolling action game set to be published by Devolver Digital in 2025. Heart Machine launched a Patreon campaign in April 2025. However, the campaign was closed in January 2026.

The studio announced in October 2025 that it was laying off a number of staff and were ending development of Hyper Light Breaker, with plans to release a meaningful final update by January 2026. Development of smaller titles like Possesor(s) would continue.

On September 16, 2026, Preston announced that "nearly everyone" at Heart Machine had been laid off following the cancellation of an unannounced title, after a publisher pulled its support of the game.

== Games ==
Year	Title	Platform(s)	Publisher
2016	Hyper Light Drifter	Linux, Microsoft Windows, OS X, PlayStation 4, Xbox One, Nintendo Switch	Self-published
2021	Solar Ash	Windows, PlayStation 4, PlayStation 5, Xbox One, Xbox Series X/S, Nintendo Switch	Annapurna Interactive
2025 (Note: Early access)	Hyper Light Breaker	Windows	Arc Games
2025	Possessor(s)	Windows	Devolver Digital
