= Kingdom Death: Monster =

Board game

- The cover image from Kingdom Death: Monster's hardcover rulebook (versions 1.5+)
- Designers: Adam Poots
- Publishers: Adam Poots Games LLC
- Publication: September 15, 2015; 10 years ago
- Genres: Miniature wargaming
- Players: 1 to 4 (standard); 5 or 6 (with game variant)
- Playing time: ≈ 60 to 180 hours
- Chance: Moderate to high (order of cards drawn, varying card outcomes, dice rolling)
- Age range: 17+
- Skills: Strategic thinking, miniature painting
- Synonyms: KDM, KD:M
- Website: kingdomdeath.com

Kingdom Death: Monster is a cooperative board game created by Adam Poots and released in 2015.

== Gameplay ==
Kingdom Death: Monster is intended to be played over multiple sessions with players developing their characters and their settlement over the length of one game. At the start, their characters are effectively naked and weaponless, but on completion of their first fight with a monster, gain gear and establish a settlement, using resources collected from combat to expand or gain new weapons and armor.

The characters must then fight a monster, starting with a Hunt phase where they trigger both beneficial and negative effects that will impact the upcoming combat. Once the hunt is complete, the players enter a Showdown phase against the target monster. Each monster has a deck of cards, shuffled at the start of combat, representing its intelligence, directing who the monster will target and with what type of attacks. Combat actions by players and the monster are resolved through dice roles. The players aim to wound the monster, or otherwise survive until the monster's card deck is exhausted. Surviving characters can gain resources or gear from the defeated monster, while characters killed in combat are removed from the game, filled using any other survivors at the players' settlement.

A full game of Kingdom Death: Monster is considered complete if the players successfully defeat a final boss monster, or if the settlement's population is reduced to zero.

The core game can be expanded by additional monsters to hunt, and/or new Gear cards. Each new monster includes the monster's miniature, the monster-specific cards related to the Hunt and Showdown phases, new Gear cards and, in some cases, new Settlement cards associated with that monster. Such monsters are typically introduced by adding new Settlement Events that force the players to fight the monster, tying in with core game events. Each expansion also includes a small rulebook that details its integration into the core game and any new special rules or Story Events.

== Development ==
Kingdom Death: Monster was developed by Adam Poots. The initial idea for the game was conceived around 2008 while he was awaiting jury duty and reading through a rulebook for a role-playing game; he believed that he could make its gameplay systems better. Key to his idea was the use of miniatures for the game, and he put about $10,000 of his own savings into finding freelance artists to design the characters and concept art for the "Kingdom Death" setting and to use 3D printing to produce figurines. Poots ran a small Kickstarter campaign in 2009 to raise about $1700 for the production of one figurine he had planned for the game. By 2010, Poots was working with a European artist who could mass-produce the figures in resin.

While the miniatures had gained some attention, Poots still wanted to produce a game to go along with them and started to design the game. Poots cites inspiration from HeroQuest and specifically its spinoff, Warhammer Quest, for the mechanics of the game. His prior work experience in web browser-based applications helped ensure the gameplay systems made sense and had the necessary flow. In 2009, he started another Kickstarter campaign to develop the game as an iOS app, but the campaign failed to reach its $10,000 goal. With more of the game mechanics in place, Poots then started a third campaign in November 2012, seeking $35,000 to complete the design and production of the game. The Kickstarter concluded with over $2 million pledged, allowing Poots to develop plans for game expansions. Poots believed that he and his team "over-delivered" on this campaign, making him feel "responsible and humbled" by the support from players, and he started to use the profits from additional sales toward further development and expansion of the game.

Kingdom Death: Monster 1.5

Poots launched another Kickstarter during the 2016 American Thanksgiving holiday weekend to promote an updated printing of the game, Kingdom Death: Monster 1.5, which included various changes and improvements to the core game as well as new content in the form of sixteen new expansions, to start publishing in 2017. Poots sought $100,000 and offered incentives for existing owners to upgrade their edition to 1.5. The Kickstarter raised $1 million within 19 minutes of going live, the fastest such drive according to Kickstarter's David Gallagher. Within a week, at least $5 million was pledged. During the campaign, Poots announced special expansions that used licensed crossovers from the Pathfinder role-playing system and the video game Hyper Light Drifter. The campaign closed with nearly $12.4 million pledged from 19,264 backers. At its conclusion, Kingdom Death: Monster was the highest earning game-related project funded through Kickstarter to that point.

== Reception ==
Kingdom Death: Monster is considered a boutique board game as the cost of the game runs from US$563.00 without the added expansions, while other board games typically cost significantly less. Much of this cost is considered reasonable due to the quality of the game's production.

Sam Machkovich of Ars Technica called the game itself "brutal" in the volume of materials shipped with it and the estimated playing time, but believed all these feed into a "four-player co-op adventure of your wildest dreams". The game is noted for having a steep learning curve, making it difficult, and is often compared to the Dark Souls series of video games.

Lillian Cohen-Moore of Bitch noted that much of the art in Kingdom Death: Monster contains overtly sexual poses and looks for the female figurines and artwork in the game, stating that "This scale of female sexualization in Kingdom Death's characterizations outweighs, for me, any other merits this game could have going for it". Poots replied that, as the game is not intended for younger audiences, he did not want to hamper his team of artists, instead allowing them to "bring forth their full potential and feel comfortable exploring a nightmare horror world". Poots stated that Kingdom Death includes pinup poses, inspired by pin-up models of the 1950s and 1960s of both male and female characters, feeling they are appropriate for the mature audiences intended for the game. Charlie Hall of Polygon found that some of the imagery within the game's manual and figures was somewhat grotesque and explicit, turning off some players and drawing attention away from the actual game itself, which he otherwise considered "masterful".
