= Glitchers =

British video-game developer

GLITCHERS
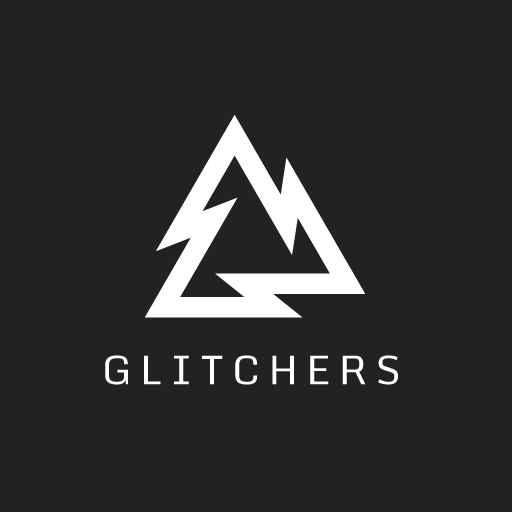
- Founded: 10 September 2013
- Headquarters: Leith, Edinburgh, Scotland
- Founder: Maxwell Scott-Slade
- Industry: Indie game design and development
- Website: glitchers.com

Glitchers is a British video-game company based in Edinburgh, Scotland.

== Overview ==
The company was founded in 2013. Glitchers is best known for developing Sea Hero Quest in 2016. The game was developed in collaboration with Alzheimer's Research UK to help dementia research by tracking players' 3D navigation.

The company's name was GLITCHE.RS from 2013 to 2016. It uses the tagline "Games for Good", and aims to "create games that could make a positive impact on the world".

== Games ==
- Plunderland (2010) is an interactive pirate adventure game for iPhone, released initially as part of Johnny Two Shoes but now developed by Glitchers and is available as part of GameClub.
- Chippy (2013), a time management game in a simulated fish and chips shop, Chippy was developed as a self-funded app based game and is now available as part of GameClub. Chippy was well received and described by Pocket Gamer as "addictive stuff, and it's easy to play".
- Gumulon (2013) is a mobile app based game promoting Stride chewing gum by requiring the player to chew to activate the game.
- Kano is an experimental colour-matching arcade game, which Glitchers explain “was designed primarily as an experiment for us to test out assumptions around player retention, payment models and growth hacking.”
- Sea Hero Quest (2016) is a mobile game which contributes to research on dementia by tracking players' 3D navigation It was designed by Glitchers in association with Alzheimer's Research UK, University College London and the University of East Anglia and with funding from Deutsche Telekom. The idea for the game came from neuroscientist Michael Hornberger of the University of East Anglia who collaborated with Hugo Spiers of University College London and a group of six other neuroscientists. A new Research Edition was announced in 2021.
- Cone Wars (2017) is an online multiplayer and PC game featuring Ice cream van turf wars in which teams compete to sell the most ice creams using weapons and tactics.
- Nestlums (2020) is a money training app for children, designed to teach good financial habits using familiar gaming techniques, developed in collaboration with Cauldron.
- Crush your FOFO (2018) was developed with the Patients Association and AbbVie to explore patients' "Fear of Finding Out" which leads them to delay seeking medical advice.
- Drive Buy (2021) is described as a "short-session multiplayer vehicle combat game with a delivery twist" and is available on Steam and Nintendo Switch

In a 2023 blog post marking the 10th anniversary of the company, two forthcoming games were described:

- Forest Guardian will concern rainforest protection
- Enhance, developed with University College London, will be a "spiritual successor" to Sea Hero Quest, "targeted at the 60-80 year old audience Sea Hero Quest couldn’t quite reach".

== Awards ==
In 2018 Sea Hero Quest was nominated for a British Academy Games Awards BAFTA in the category: Game Beyond Entertainment, a new category for games which "deliver a transformational experience beyond pure entertainment". Sea Hero Quest also won bronze in the 2018 The One Show awards.

Also in 2018 Glitchers won a Webby award for Social Impact.

In 2020 Sea Hero Quest was nominated for the Coney Island Dreamland Award for Best AR/VR Game at the New York Game Awards.

In 2022 the company was awarded funding from the UK Games Fund to support the development of Cone Wars.
