= Brawlout =

2017 fighting video game

- Developer: Angry Mob Games
- Publishers: Angry Mob Games; Merge Games
- Engine: Unity
- Platforms: Microsoft Windows; Nintendo Switch; PlayStation 4 Xbox One
- Release: August 21, 2018
- Genre: Fighting
- Modes: Single-player, multiplayer

Brawlout is a fighting game developed and published by Angry Mob Games for Microsoft Windows, Nintendo Switch, PlayStation 4, and Xbox One. The game was revealed at EVO in July 2016, and went into closed beta in December 2016. The game was initially released as early access for Microsoft Windows on April 20, 2017. Various outlets, such as Engadget, have compared Brawlout to the Super Smash Bros. series.

Angry Mob Games partnered with UK publisher Merge Games to release physical retail copies for the Nintendo Switch in May 2018.

== Gameplay ==
Brawlout is a platform fighter in which two to four players fight against each other, in an environment with various platforms. The game features 25 playable characters, including four guest fighters. Characters use a variety of fighting moves and special attacks. Each attack does damage, increasing the opponent's damage percent. When the damage increases, the victim flies further. The purpose of each battle is to throw one's opponents off the stage.

Brawlout does not use blocking, and most characters are incapable of grabbing others. Instead, its gameplay is based on combos. Fighting builds up the player's Rage Meter, which fuels powerful special attacks, and adds an extra layer of strategy, by triggering the Combo Breaker or Rage Mode.

=== Playable Characters ===
- Acolyte
- Apucalypse
- Apunaut
- Chief Feathers
- Condor X
- Dead Cells ^{g}
- Dr. Tysonstein
- Funkmaster
- Gancho Puncho
- Juan Aguacate ^{g}
- King Apu
- Mako
- Natu’ra
- Nightma’ra
- Olaf/Tyson
- Ooga/Tooga
- Paco
- Ripjack
- Senator Feathers
- Sephi’ra
- Sting’ra
- The Drifter ^{g}
- Vandal
- Volt
- Yooka-Laylee ^{g}

^g Guest character

== Online modes ==
Brawlout was designed for both couch and online play, with 2-4 player quick matches, ranked ladders, private lobbies, and Brawlout TV for watching live matches and featured replays and for making live tournaments easier to stream.

== Reception ==
Reception

Aggregate score
Aggregator	Score
Metacritic	61

Review scores
Publication	Score
Destructoid	70
Edge	30
Game Informer	65
GameSpot	50
IGN	75
Nintendo Life	70
Push Square	60

The digital version of the Nintendo Switch release of Brawlout sold over 50,000 copies in its first two weeks on sale. The game won the award for "Game, Original Fighting" at the National Academy of Video Game Trade Reviewers Awards.

The Nintendo Switch, Xbox One, and PlayStation 4 versions of the game have received "mixed or average reviews" according to review aggregate site Metacritic.
