= Tales from Space: About a Blob =

2011 video game

- Developer: DrinkBox Studios
- Publisher: Drinkbox Studios
- Producer: Ryan McLean
- Designers: Chris Harvey; Chris McQuinn; Sheldon Laframboise; Nitai Bessette
- Programmers: Chris Harvey; Alex Smithers; Mayuran Thurairatnam; Chris Stewart
- Artists: Stephanie Goulet; Augusto Quijano
- Composer: Peter Chapman
- Series: Tales from Space
- Platform: PlayStation 3
- Release: February 1, 2011
- Genre: Puzzle-platform
- Modes: Single-player, multiplayer

Tales from Space: About a Blob is a side-scrolling puzzle-platform game about a race of alien Blobs developed and published by DrinkBox Studios for the PlayStation 3 video game console. The game has a retro-inspired monster-movie art style and local co-op gameplay.

The title was originally released on the PlayStation Network for PlayStation Plus users on February 1, 2011, and subsequently released for general download for the North American PSN on February 8, 2011, and Europe on February 9, 2011. A free downloadable content costume editor was released in an update on March 8, 2011 where players can dress their Blobs in various outfits.

The sequel, Tales from Space: Mutant Blobs Attack, was released in February 2012 as a launch title for the PlayStation Vita.

== Gameplay ==
The player controls a gelatinous Blob character who has a range of abilities that are unlocked over the course of the game. The controls include those of a typical platformer with the addition of digestion (absorb/shoot objects), magnetism (repulse/attract) and electricity (gain/deplete). The game itself is split into 4 Tiers comprising 17 levels. Over the course of a level a player received target sizes that must be reached by locating and absorbing surrounding objects. Larger objects can be absorbed when the Blob increases in size. Target sizes are treated as sections within a level where a player must traverse platforms, solve puzzles, and fight enemies in order to proceed.

== Story ==
The game involves a species of interstellar gelatinous blobs that travel the universe looking for their next meal. These blobs end up on a distant Earthlike planet that has fallen prey to mass industrialization. Upon landing on this planet the main Blob, which is controlled by the player, is captured by an evil scientist and must then begin the task of escaping, saving fellow Blob friends, and cleaning the planet.

== Reception ==
Tales from Space: About a Blob was generally well received from critics, earning a Metacritic score of 76/100. Major review such as sites IGN and Eurogamer both gave the game an 8/10 due to its "eye-catching art style" and "fresh ideas and powers that evolve the gameplay at the right time". Most noted was the game's unique art style and magnetic power. There were critics who felt the gameplay was too short - a total of 17 levels, along with bouts of frustration when precise platforming was required.
