= We Are OFK =

2022 video game

- Developer: Team OFK
- Publisher: Team OFK
- Director: Teddy Dief
- Producer: Mikayla Foote
- Programmer: Jarryd Huntley
- Artists: Jenny Yu; Nafisah Tung
- Writers: Claire Jia; Teddy Dief
- Composer: omniboi
- Engine: Unity
- Platforms: PlayStation 4; PlayStation 5; Microsoft Windows; Nintendo Switch
- Release: August 18 — September 8, 2022
- Genres: Adventure, visual novel
- Mode: Single-player

We Are OFK is an episodic narrative adventure game developed by Team OFK and directed by Teddy Dief. Its five episodes released between August and September 2022 for PlayStation 4, PlayStation 5, Microsoft Windows and Nintendo Switch. It serves as the fictional biography of the developers' virtual band, OFK.

== Gameplay ==
The player chooses dialogue choices for one of the four characters by selecting thoughts or by texting on a phone. The five music videos contain interactive elements, including collecting or interacting with objects.

== Plot ==
The band OFK consists of keyboard player and manager Itsumi Saito, singer Luca Le Fae, visual artist Carter Flores and producer Jey Zhang. It is set in Los Angeles.

== Development and release ==
Funding was provided by Kowloon Nights. The game and virtual band were announced with a concert video at The Game Awards 2020 for release in spring 2021. OFK's songs were composed by Thom Powers and Luna Shadows. It was delayed to 2022 and the episodes were released in weekly intervals, except for one and two releasing simultaneously. In May 2023, the developer said the game's name would be changed to Pop. Love. Panic!

Episodes	Release date
Episode 1 - hooks and 2 loops	August 18
Episode 3 - smash	August 25
Episode 4 - splits	September 1
Episode 5 - mix	September 8

== Reception ==
The Guardian said the stakes may seem small, but in the end it's hard not to be invested in the origin story. Rock Paper Shotgun stated the lack of closure can be frustrating, but may be the entire point of the game, similar to life. Inverse magazine criticized that focusing on the band diminishes the personal stories, but it still succeeds in portraying the struggle of corporate and artistic identities. GameSpot said the storyline may feel too "on rails", but praised the characters' journey as expressed in the music videos.

The game was nominated at the Independent Games Festival Awards 2023 for Excellence in Audio. It won a 2023 Peabody Award.
