= Solar Ash =

- Developer: Heart Machine
- Publisher: Annapurna Interactive
- Director: Chelsea Hash
- Composers: Troupe Gammage; Joel Corelitz; Disasterpeace; Azuria Sky
- Series: Hyper Light
- Engine: Unreal Engine 4
- Platforms: PlayStation 4; PlayStation 5; Windows; Nintendo Switch; Xbox One; Xbox Series X/S
- Release: PS4, PS5, Windows; December 2, 2021; Switch, Xbox One, Xbox Series X/S; September 14, 2023
- Genre: Platform
- Mode: Single-player

Solar Ash is an action-adventure platform game developed by Heart Machine and published by Annapurna Interactive. It was released on December 2, 2021 for PlayStation 4, PlayStation 5 and Microsoft Windows. It was also released via Steam on December 8, 2022, and it was released for Nintendo Switch, Xbox One and Xbox Series X/S on September 14, 2023. The game's science fiction story explores themes of trauma and moving on from dramatic, devastating life events. It is set in the same fictional universe as Heart Machine's first and previous game, Hyper Light Drifter, but there are no direct connections between the two games' stories.

== Gameplay ==
The player can climb massive beasts, called Remnants.

Solar Ash is an action-adventure platform game. The player controls the main character Rei (voiced by Fryda Wolff), a Voidrunner within a black hole known as the Ultravoid, through a bright-neon colored, three-dimensional landscape, avoiding obstacles and attacking enemies with energy slashes and a phase-shifted and hard light sword, as Rei tries to save her planet. The game's focus is less about combat and more on movement, as lead developer Alx Preston stated "We're traversal first. That was kind of the vision of the game: Control the traversal, the environments that you're moving through, and the spectacle of it all. Especially the scale on the grandiosity of it just feeling impossibly large and you're feeling really tiny and insignificant in as many ways as possible. The traversal absolutely takes precedence and the combat is kind of intermingled with that traversal."

== Development ==
Coming off of their previous title Hyper Light Drifter, Heart Machine founder Alx Preston felt that "we'd done what we wanted to do in 2D" with that game. Solar Ash moved to 3D which Preston credited for why it "has taken almost five years" to develop. Seeking to raise its ambition, the studio felt that 3D was much more scalable but it was also more demanding. During development, the studio moved from GameMaker Studio to Unreal Engine 4 which required Heart Machine's core team to scale up from 5 people to around 25 people as it required talent familiar with 3D game development. In order to create Solar Ash's landscapes at the necessary scale, Heart Machine relied on Houdini for node-based procedural generation.

The game was first announced as Solar Ash Kingdom in March 2019 as Heart Machine's follow-up to their 2016 title, Hyper Light Drifter. Alx Preston, the game's lead developer, said they want to set Solar Ash Kingdom apart from their previous game through "a whole new set of incredible tech and key innovations". The game had been in development for some time prior to this, and Preston said "We strive to tell a beautiful story through our world, the atmosphere, our characters and even our gameplay - each aspect of our games are painstakingly considered - which requires a large investment of time". At the time of announcement, Heart Machine affirmed the game would be released by Annapurna Interactive for Windows as an Epic Games Store timed exclusive.

By June 2020, the game was revealed to also be planned for release on the PlayStation 4 and PlayStation 5, as well as being rebranded to just Solar Ash. As part of Annapurna's July 2021 showcase, Solar Ash was confirmed to be scheduled for an October 26, 2021 release. A few weeks before this date, Heart Machine announced a delay until December 2, 2021, stating "We want Solar Ash to shine, and we need a bit more time to get the last pieces of polish and bug fixes into the game, while still navigating this global pandemic as a highly dedicated team."

== Release ==
Solar Ash was released digitally on December 2, 2021 for Windows via the Epic Games Store, PlayStation 4, and PlayStation 5. It was released for Windows via Steam on December 8, 2022 and released for Xbox One and Xbox Series X/S on September 14, 2023.

== Reception ==
Reception

Aggregate score
Aggregator	Score
Metacritic	(PC) 78/100 (PS5) 78/100

Review scores
Publication	Score
Destructoid	6/10
Eurogamer	Recommended
Game Informer	8.75/10
GameSpot	8/10
GamesRadar+	4.5/5
Hardcore Gamer	4.5/5
IGN	7/10
Jeuxvideo.com	16/20
Push Square	7/10

Solar Ash received "generally favorable" reviews according to review aggregator Metacritic. Critics unanimously praised the game's atmosphere and feel while criticizing the story delivery and collectible suits, among other things.

Christian Donlan of Eurogamer praised the game's atmosphere and how personal the game felt, writing, "What makes Solar Ash special, I think, is the fact that all these semi-familiar parts are filtered through a deeper set of influences that feel like entirely personal preoccupations." Marcus Stewart of Game Informer praised the game's gripping and engaging nature, saying, "Fine-tuned platforming wrapped around a gorgeous world and alluring storytelling make Solar Ash a wholly entertaining cosmic romp." GameSpot praised the game's movement, bosses, puzzles, and levels, while criticizing lore overdose present in the narrative. Push Square similarly sung its praises while lamenting the empty open world and enemies that posed little to no threat.

Chris Moyse of Destructoid gave the game six out of ten, writing about its missed potential, stating, "Solar Ash offers a collection of promising concepts that don't quite hit realization. While undoubtedly a visually striking experience, Rei's journey into the Ultravoid suffers due to a disengaging narrative and repetitious gameplay. Solar Ash's attractive world struggles to provide the player with captivating experiences."
