= Sea Hero Quest =

2016 video game

- Developer: Glitchers
- Release: WW: 2016

Sea Hero Quest is a mobile game which contributes to research on dementia. It was designed by independent British game company Glitchers in 2016 in association with Alzheimer's Research UK, University College London and the University of East Anglia and with funding from Deutsche Telekom. The idea for the game came from neuroscientist Michael Hornberger of the University of East Anglia who collaborated with Hugo Spiers of University College London, Antoine Coutrot of CNRS and a group of six other neuroscientists.

The game was designed to help researchers to understand the mental process of 3D navigation, which is one of the first skills lost in dementia. It was hoped that a large number of people would play the game, thus contributing much more data than could easily be obtained in a laboratory experiment.

In August 2017, a virtual reality edition of the game was released.

== Gameplay ==
The plot of the game involves a sea journey taken by a son in a quest to recover the memories his father has lost to dementia. There are three sections: navigation, shooting flares to test orientation, and chasing creatures. Each has been "carefully crafted to be as fun and exciting as it is scientifically valid".

== Reception ==
It was named "App of the week" by BT. It won nine Cannes Lions at the 2016 International Festival of Creativity.

By February 2017, the game had been downloaded 2.7 million times. By October 2021 it had been played by 4.3 million players for a total of 117 years, yielding data which would have taken 17,600 years to produce using conventional lab methods.

The game was nominated for the 2018 British Academy Games Awards, in the new category "Game Beyond Entertainment" for games which "deliver a transformational experience beyond pure entertainment". At the 2018 Webby Awards, it won the award for "Social Impact". It was also nominated for the Coney Island Dreamland Award for Best AR/VR Game at the 2020 New York Game Awards.

== Further work ==
The game is no longer available to individuals, but can be used as part of new research projects.

The game was used in research into the influence of childhood environment on navigation ability; it was found that "growing up outside cities appears to be good for the development of navigational abilities, and this seems to be influenced by the lack of complexity of many street networks in cities", while "the countryside is a rather complex environment in that it is very unorganised, with greater distances, meaning you have to memorise your route". The researchers developed a variant of the game, City Hero Quest, to test how well city-dwellers got on in cities.
