= Guacamelee! 2 =

2018 Metroidvania platform video game

- Developer: DrinkBox Studios
- Publisher: DrinkBox Studios
- Series: Guacamelee!
- Platforms: PlayStation 4; Windows; Nintendo Switch; Xbox One
- Release: PlayStation 4, Windows; August 21, 2018; Nintendo Switch; December 10, 2018; Xbox One; January 18, 2019
- Genres: Metroidvania, platformer
- Modes: Single-player, multiplayer

Guacamelee! 2 is a Metroidvania platform video game developed and published by DrinkBox Studios. A sequel to Guacamelee!, the game was released for PlayStation 4 and Windows in August 2018 while the Nintendo Switch version was released on December 10. The Xbox One version was released on January 18, 2019. The game received generally positive reviews upon release.

== Gameplay ==
Guacamelee! 2 is a Metroidvania platform game. The player controls Juan Aguacate, a luchador who fights with punches, kicks, and wrestling grapples. Over the course of the game, Juan re-acquires many of his powers from the previous game, many of which have both combat and movement applications - for example the Rooster Uppercut, which grants vertical mobility while also attacking enemies overhead and breaking like-coloured obstacles. Each special move is associated with a color, which surrounds Juan whenever he uses them. For example, the Rooster Uppercut is associated with red. Whenever Juan uses it, his outline turns red. He also learns new tricks from completing challenges set by trainers found throughout the world, such as more damaging attacks or additional health. The most drastic change is the chicken transformation - while in the previous game it was only for traversing small corridors, it now has an entire fighting moveset of its own with unique special moves. There are also challenge rooms for players to explore. The game can be played solo or cooperatively with three other players. The game features more enemy types, abilities and larger maps when compared with its predecessor.

== Story ==
The game begins with a simplified version of the first game's final confrontation with the world-rending Calaca, leading into the true ending where the luchador Juan successfully saves the life of El Presidente's Daughter, Lupita. Seven years later, the two are married and live with two children, with Juan having grown out of shape. Black clouds begin to appear in the village, followed by Juan's mentor Uay Chivo appearing to tell him the entire "Mexiverse" is in danger. He brings Juan through a portal to "The Darkest Timeline", where the source of the trouble is. In this timeline, Juan and Lupita were killed by Calaca, who was defeated by another luchador called Salvador. In the seven years since, Salvador has become corrupted by the power of his mask, and now wishes to collect three relics alongside Salvador’s assistants: sociopathic musician and playwright El Muneco, the murderous, cruel anthropomorphic and sentient dog-skeleton Uay Pek, and a hyper intelligent vulture and cactus named Zope and Cactuardo. Salvador plots to access the Sacred Guacamole in the realm of El Otromundo and become all-powerful. However, by beginning to collect the relics, he has caused the timelines to destabilize, which will mean the end of all timelines if he is not stopped.

Juan is led to reunite with Tostada, the Guardian of the Mask, so he can be restored to fighting form. They begin to travel the world to stop Salvador and his underlings from collecting the relics, but ultimately fail, and Salvador successfully gets to the Sacred Guacamole. However, Juan eventually defeats him, which destroys Salvador's mask and results in his death. The timelines are restored and the Mexiverse is saved, but this prevents Juan from returning to his own timeline. Recalling an earlier conversation, where it's said that El Otromundo connects all the timelines together, he leaps back into El Otromundo before the way closes and looks out across the great many indistinguishable portals.

In the normal ending, Juan's family awaits his return for many years, before he eventually appears. In the true ending, attained if the player clears the Chicken Illuminati's crucible and meets the Holy Hen, Juan recalls her advice and removes his mask, immediately identifying the correct portal and returning to his family without delay.

== Downloadable Content ==
The first downloadable content called Three Enemigos Pack, was released on November 27, 2018 and includes three new character costumes: El Muñeco, Uay Pek and Jaguar Javier who also appear as bosses in the main game. Each costume provides new abilities while also having disadvantages to balance gameplay. El Muñeco can heal faster while in chicken form, but heals more slowly in human form. Uay Pek can steal health from enemies in the spirit world after each enemy hit, but in the living world takes significantly more damage. Jaguar Javier builds a damage multiplier with each dodge of an enemy attack but after failing a dodge damage is decreased dramatically. The DLC also includes new trophies/achievements.

The second DLC called The Proving Grounds was released on December 7, 2018 and contains 15 challenge levels. Players can earn bronze, silver and gold medals for completing different requirements, such as completing the level in a certain amount of time, lasting a number of rounds or maintaining a combo. The levels are broken down into five groups of three, with each group having a trainer who is also a boss in the main game. After obtaining a gold medal for all challenges in the group the player is rewarded with a costume of the trainer; if the player obtains gold medals for all 15 challenges, they are granted access to the Salvador costume and can play as the main antagonist of the game.

Eliot Osage of Bonus Stage commented on the difficulty of the challenges calling them "punishing" and also stating "The Proving Grounds will ask you to use every bit of skill, cunning and patience that you’ve developed throughout your play of Guacamelee 2 [sic] in order to complete them" and ultimately said that it is "a truly challenging bonus world with tantalizing rewards". As with Three Enemigos Pack the DLC includes new trophies/achievements. All previously released DLC was later included in Guacamelee 2! Complete Edition.

== Development ==
The game was developed by DrinkBox Studios. Unlike its predecessor, the game was not released for the PlayStation Vita as DrinkBox opted to use the PlayStation 4 as the base platform to utilize its new rendering engine. The team prototyped different moves for Juan. However, they decided to retain all the moves from the original as they felt that they were more intuitive than the new ones created. With Guacamelee! 2, the studio was able to revisit ideas that were scrapped during the development of the first game, and expand on the existing mechanics and systems.

The game was announced at Paris Games Week by Sony Interactive Entertainment in October 2017. It was released for PlayStation 4 and Windows on August 21, 2018. DrinkBox released the Nintendo Switch version on December 10, 2018.

== Reception ==
Reception

Aggregate score
Aggregator	Score
Metacritic	PC: 84/100; PS4: 83/100; NS: 87/100; XONE: 85/100

Review scores
Publication	Score
Destructoid	9.5/10
Game Informer	8.75/10
GameSpot	9/10
IGN	9.3/10
Nintendo Life	8/10
Push Square	8/10

The game received generally favourable reviews according to review aggregator website Metacritic.

It was nominated for "Control Design, 2D or Limited 3D" and "Game, Franchise Action" at the National Academy of Video Game Trade Reviewers Awards.
