= Drinkbox Studios =

Canadian video game developer

Drinkbox Studios Inc.
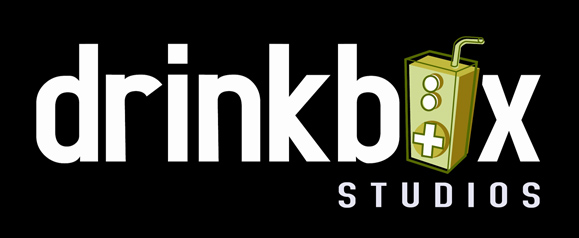
- Formerly: Not a Number Software (2008)
- Type: Private
- Industry: Video games
- Predecessor: Pseudo Interactive
- Founded: April 2008; 18 years ago
- Founders: Chris Harvey; Ryan MacLean; Graham Smith
- Headquarters: Toronto, Canada
- Key people: Chris Harvey (CTO); Ryan MacLean (CEO); Graham Smith (COO)
- Website: drinkboxstudios.com

Drinkbox Studios Inc. is a Canadian video game developer based in Toronto. The company was founded in April 2008 by Chris Harvey, Ryan MacLean and Graham Smith, three programmers previously employed by Pseudo Interactive, which closed earlier that year. Drinkbox is best known for the Guacamelee! series of games.

== History ==
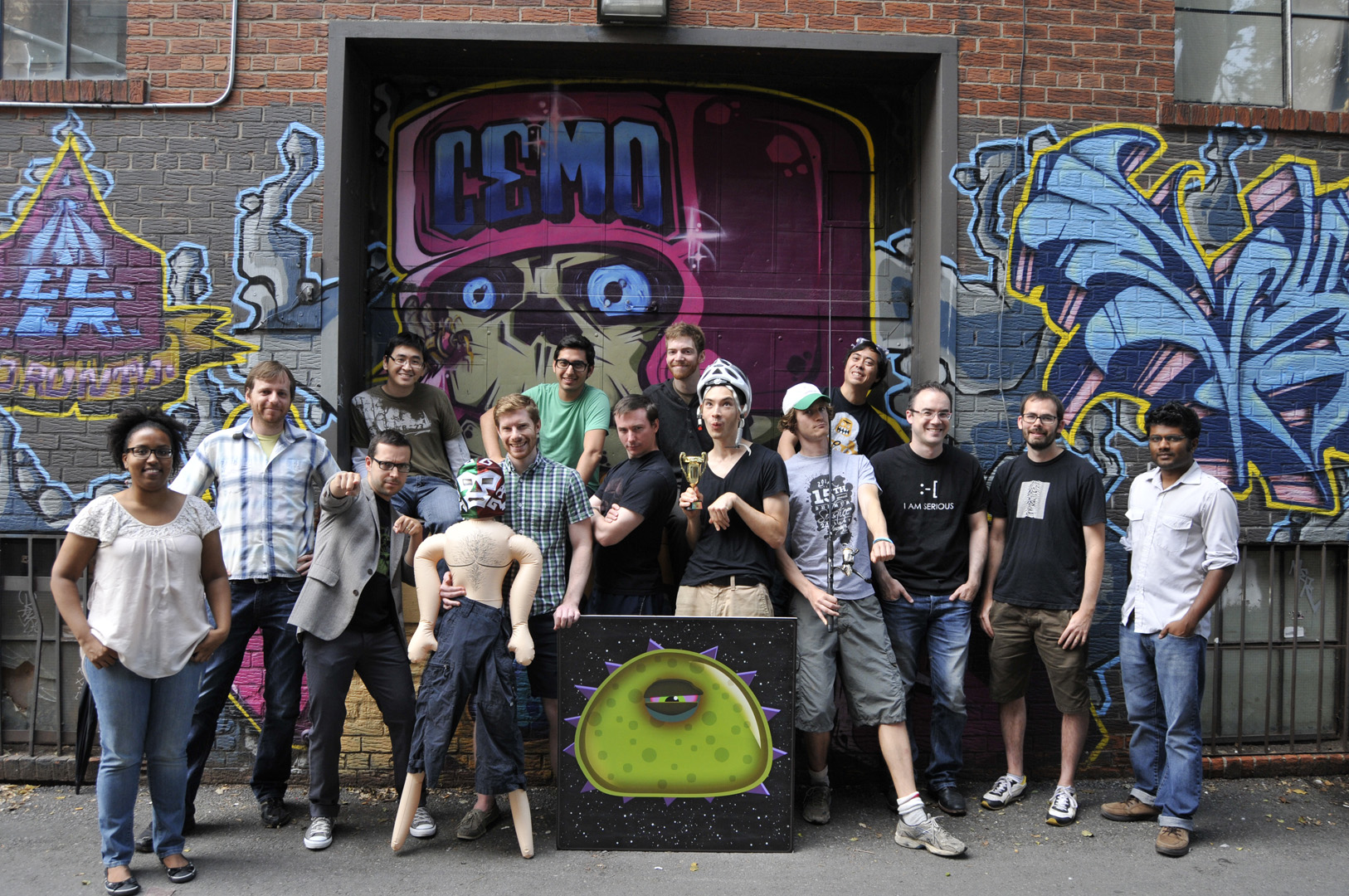
Drinkbox Studios team photo, 2012

In 2008, Toronto-based video game developer Pseudo Interactive laid off the majority of its staff before closing down completely. Out of the laid-off employees, many left Toronto to work in other places, while three programmers, Chris Harvey, Ryan MacLean and Graham Smith, stayed to found their own game studio in April that year. Their idea was to create a game company that would create games they would want to play. Initially, the company was called Not a Number Software, but the team quickly considered the name to be a bad choice and changed it to DrinkBox Studios. In the weeks following DrinkBox's foundation, they hired a senior artist and a designer to move forward with the company as a five-man team.

== Games developed ==
Games developed by Drinkbox Studios
Year	Title	Platform(s)
2011	Tales from Space: About a Blob	PlayStation 3
2012	Tales from Space: Mutant Blobs Attack	Linux, macOS, Microsoft Windows, PlayStation 3, PlayStation Vita, Xbox 360, Nintendo Switch
2013	Guacamelee!	PlayStation 3, PlayStation Vita
2013	Guacamelee! Gold Edition	Linux, macOS, Microsoft Windows
2014	Guacamelee! Super Turbo Championship Edition	Microsoft Windows, PlayStation 4, Wii U, Xbox 360, Xbox One, Nintendo Switch
2016	Severed	iOS, Nintendo 3DS family of systems, Nintendo Switch, PlayStation Vita, Wii U
2018	Guacamelee! 2	Microsoft Windows, PlayStation 4, Nintendo Switch, Xbox One
2022	Nobody Saves the World	Microsoft Windows, Xbox One, Xbox Series X/S, Nintendo Switch, PlayStation 4, PlayStation 5
2027	Blighted	Microsoft Windows, Nintendo Switch 2
