= Johnny Two Shoes =

British game developer

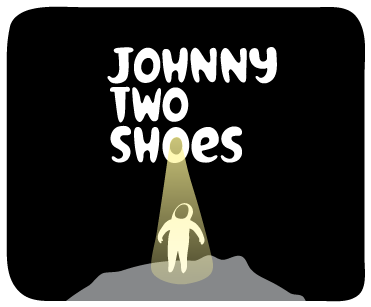
- Dissolved: 1 October 2019
- Headquarters: London, England
- Industry: Indie Game Development
- Products: Flash and iPhone Platform Games
- Website: Johnnytwoshoes.com (archived) Johnnytwoshoes.games (conservation effort)
- Launched: 1 August 2007

Johnny Two Shoes was an indie game development studio based in London, UK. Johnny Two Shoes developed online Flash games, as well as games for the iPhone/iPad platform. The studio released 17 Flash games and 2 iPhone games, winning multiple awards for their work.

== Site history ==
In May 2007, Johnny Two Shoes was born as a portfolio for founder Joshua Scott-Slade, but the site was redesigned in July of the same year as an Adobe Flash game site with the Flash works of Joshua Scott-Slade and graphics from Sarah Jones. The site was entirely redesigned in June 2008. The newly redesigned site hosted and promoted only Johnny Two Shoes games, added a leaderboard based on a medals system, and contained a relevant blog that users could comment on. Johnnytwoshoes also created an image blog called "llllost" that uses Jing to share their works in progress with members.

In the summer of 2009, Johnny Two Shoes opened a forum for all users. This forum allowed more feedback for the developers, and the creation of a true community for the members. The forum would eventually be updated with a ratings system, full search and RSS capability, and a private Notes system.

According to the UK's Companies House, the studio was dissolved on 1 October 2019.

== Works ==
=== Commissioned works ===
The Heist was released in October 2008, marking the beginning of a series of corporate partnerships. The Heist was developed as a commission for AddictingGames, a Viacom company. The game, based on the SandStorm and High Speed Chase platforms, features a get-away scene but no actual robbery scene. In July 2009, Johnny Two Shoes released The Heist 2, the sequel to The Heist. The game, another commission for AddictingGames, used a combination of the High Speed Chase 2 engine, along with a custom engine that allowed the gameplay to include a robbery scene and get-away scene.

The Great Sperm Race was released in March 2009 as a commission for Channel 4, funded by the Wellcome Trust. The game was built as a companion to a documentary titled "The Great Sperm Race" that aired on Channel 4 in the UK. Both the game and documentary educated viewers on human fertility. The game extended this education by giving the viewer a hands-on experience on the subject of human fertility.

Johnny Two Shoes was commissioned once again by Channel 4, funded by the Wellcome Trust in July 2009 to create three companion games to a documentary called Inside Nature's Giants. Inside Nature's Giants, focused on some of the largest mammals in the animal kingdom and served to demonstrate evolution. An Asian elephant, a Fin whale, a crocodile, and Rothschild giraffe were all dissected to study the internal structure of the animals. The information collected in the dissections, led by evolutionary biologist Professor Richard Dawkins and comparative anatomist Dr. Joy Reidenberg, will help scientists gain knowledge about the biology of animals.

Johnny Two Shoes was commissioned by Warner Bros. in late 2009 to assist in the development of a two-player online experience, 221B. 221B promoted Warner Bros.'s new movie Sherlock Holmes, using Facebook to support and promote the new film. 221B requires users to connect a Facebook account, which allows the user to connect with a second player and to save their progress. Johnny Two Shoes collaborated with AKQA, co-creators of 221B Hide & Seek, AI developers Existor, and video production and editing company Spicer Moore to create the online experience. Johnny Two Shoes specifically worked on the Flash development necessary for 221B.

=== Flash game releases ===
The first game from Johnny Two Shoes, Thermostorm, was released in July 2007. The second game, HighSpeedChase was released in August 2007 as the company was founded. Several games followed in the coming months. Between November 2007 and June 2008, the games Comatose, Attak, A Bird's Journey, Pirates of JTS, and Catch of the Day were all released. Attak was highly reviewed by Jay Is Games, who said "the brothers at Johnny Two Shoes have delivered with sonic, accessible Flash." helping to further put Johnny Two Shoes into the spotlight.

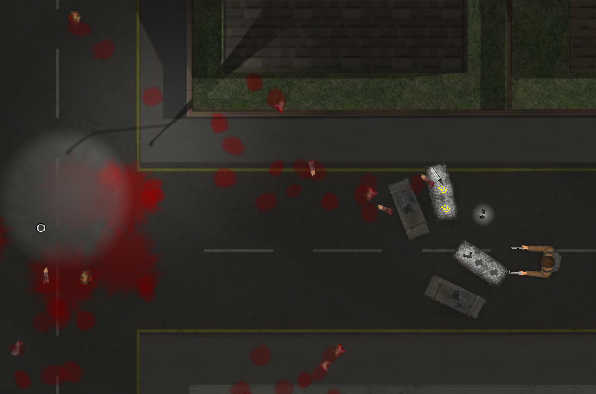
Gameplay from the game Comatose

The Banana Dash series started with the release of Banana Dash World 1 in July 2008. The game featured a monkey in which players are challenged to get the monkey through a course and to the goal before time runs out. The sequel Banana Dash World 2 was released the next month, featuring the monkey in a ball this time. Lastly, Banana Dash World 3 was released in September 2008, taking the series into outer space and placing the monkey into his very own spaceship. Players are challenged to collect and bananas and reach the goal using the spaceship's rockets and planets' gravity to achieve the goal. This series of games helped Johnny Two Shoes to become better known in the game development community. Johnny Two Shoes moved onto a racing platform with the release of SandStorm in September 2008. The development of this engine would be key in the creation of future games, such as The Heist series.

Johnny Two Shoes worked on a series of commissioned games after the release of SandStorm. Banana Dash World 4 would be the next game released from the studio after these commissions. The game was released in October 2009 after a 3-month radio silence after the release of Inside Nature's Giants. The studio was working on a separate secret project for Electronic Arts. Banana Dash World 4 featured brand-new physics, and took the series underwater into a yellow submarine, reminiscent of The Beatles' song Yellow Submarine. The style of the game runs through new releases from Johnny Two Shoes, including the imminent release of Plunderland for iPhone.

The most recent game release from Johnny Two Shoes took place in January 2010 with the release of High Speed Chase 2 for the web. This web-based version of the iPhone platform game High Speed Chase2 offers unlockable power-ups that differ from the power-ups in the iPhone version. Enemies, known as "targets" in the game, also varied in style and difficulty, ranging from simple cars to a tank.

=== Planned works ===
==== The Flying Machine ====
The Flying Machine was a planned Flash game that serves as a complementary experience to the film of the same name by BreakThru Films. The film is a mix between stop-frame, live action, and CGI celebrating "the role that music and dance play in our lives, especially in our first pre-teen steps into the adult world" as well as the journey of Frédéric Chopin throughout his life. The film and game are expected to be released this year. The game itself is an abstract take on the film splitting gameplay across 3 or 4 key locations. Warsaw, Paris and London are all included at the moment, but a fourth may be added. A preview of the game was available on the site, limited to just the Warsaw level. A Polish version of the game was also in the works.

=== iPhone game releases ===
==== High Speed Chase 2 ====
Johnny Two Shoes released its first iPhone-platform game, High Speed Chase 2 in July 2009. This game was released only for the iPhone, with no web-based companion at its initial release. The sequel to web-based High Speed Chase, High Speed Chase 2 for iPhone offered multiple missions to complete, whereas the web-based High Speed Chase only had one level. High Speed Chase 2 for iPhone also included power-ups that could be used to assist the player. The web-based version of High Speed Chase2 would not follow for several months to come. In the press release for High Speed Chase 2 for iPhone, Maxwell Scott-Slade was quoted:

"Our focus is on gameplay, what makes a game fun and not just graphics or recycling old ideas; Because a game isn't just one thing — it's a complicated blend of balanced Artificial Intelligence, appropriate Graphic Design, evolving Game Logic, incessant Optimisation, imaginative Marketing and exciting Illustration."

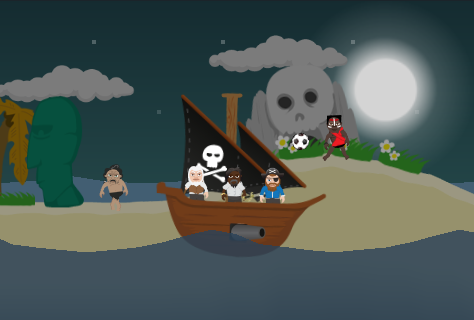
Gameplay from the iPhone game Plunderland

==== Plunderland ====
Released on 22 July 2010, Plunderland was Johnny Two Shoes's second iPhone app and is currently the flagship game for Johnny Two Shoes. Designed for the iPhone's iOS4 operating system, Plunderland is a rough take on the studio's Flash-based game Pirates of JTS. Although the basic components of the two games seem similar, they are very much different from each other. Most notably, Plunderland includes a campaign and storyline, which Pirates of JTS does not. The physics engine itself was remodeled and improved while graphics were redone. Unlockable boats, multi-touch compatibility, and a dynamic intelligent point-of-view camera are features of Plunderland, as revealed in a July 2010 interview with Pocket Gamer.

Unlike High Speed Chase 2 for iPhone, Plunderland does not include an on-screen joystick to control the ship's movement. Instead, tilting the iPhone controls the ship, as detected by the device's accelerometer. All other interactions, such as firing cannons and picking up treasure, are controlled via the touch screen.

Plunderland Reception

Review scores
Publication	Score
IGN	8.9/10
AppAdvice	4.5/5
AppSpy	4/5
iLounge	A−
Pocket Gamer	8/10
Slide to Play	4/4

Awards
Publication	Award
iTunes	iPhone App of the Week
IGN	Editor's Choice
Pocket Gamer	Silver Award

Plunderland also has unique scenery to be encountered by the player through gameplay. The islands on which the “Island people” reside on vary depending on the type of island people. There are three types of island people, paradise, eskimo and tribal. The tribal are more territorial than the paradise islanders, so they are more likely to fight back, and fight hard when being plundered. Also, sharks, crabs and sea monsters will attacking your ship as you plunder. Joshua Scott-Slade described the gameplay as this:

"A shark attacks you, but instead of shooting it or being scared, you can grab it, pull it out of the water and use it as a weapon against the enemies. If you have a taste for the dramatic, you can even tear it in half when you no longer require its services."

Version 1.1 of Plunderland offers support for all generation iPhones, iPod Touch, and iPads, but all devices must have iOS 3.1.3 or later installed to run the app. Apple Game Center was added for the app, though Game Center only supports: 2nd generation iPod Touch/newer, iPhone 3GS/newer, and all iPads. There are 3 campaigns and 2 arcade modes in this version, with more said to be developed and released later. Music and sounds for the new campaign was tweeted to be created by Tim Garratt of the UK band Pet Scenes. Multi-tasking and optimized artwork debuted in v1.1 as well.

===== Reception =====
Plunderland has been reviewed by several notable websites, such as Pocket Gamer and Touch Arcade. Scores in these reviews are most 8/10 or 9/10. Many of these reviews thought highly of the unique graphics, career mode with storyline, and overall physics.

"Plunderland is consistent in its creativity and quality, yet equally unpredictable when it comes to combat. Like the infamous Edward Low you just never know what you're going to get from one moment to the next."

Most reviews though have noted that the touch screen controls can become clustered in high intensity scenes. When the screen gets crowded, the game may think you are picking up an enemy when you are actually trying to fire.

"The controls do get in the way from time to time where you're trying to fire, but the game thinks you're trying to pick up an enemy in the water or vice versa. Also when you pick up enemies the camera zooms in and when this happens you can't see the ship locations to fire upon them."

Plunderland has been spotted on Apple's iPad 2 in various Apple stores installed as a preview app.

== Awards and recognition ==
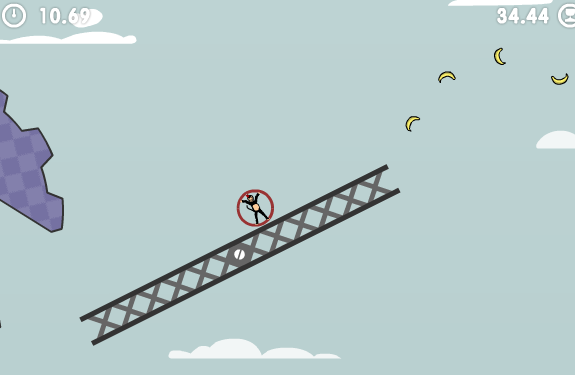
Screenshot Banana Dash World 2

Johnny Two Shoes has received multiple awards for their Flash games. Banana Dash World One received the Super Flash Game Friday award from Mochi Media. The Super Flash Game Friday award, which featured hundreds of submissions, was awarded to only ten submissions. Secondly, Johnny Two Shoes received recognition from Mochi Media again when they received the Flash Game Friday award for Banana Dash World 2. This award recognizes newly released Flash games for high quality. Lastly, Johnny Two Shoes's game The Heist 2 won the Most LOL Game award in the 2010 AddictingGames Showdown. This showdown, which was judged solely by AddictingGames users, showed the popularity of Johnny Two Shoes in the general public.

Johnnytwoshoes was invited to speak at the 2010 BAFTA: Creative Collaborations event hosted by TIGA on 12 April 2010, which addressed how "UK games, film, TV and book industries can learn from working together" to over 180 guests from across the creative industries.

Plunderland was recognized as iPhone App of the Week in the iTunes App Store for the week of 22 July. Plunderland was also given the Silver Award in a review by Pocket Gamer, in which writer Tracy Erickson said:

"Plunderland is energetic pirating at your fingertips, a high seas adventure with charm and originality "

== Conservation effort ==
Maxwell Scott-Slade, one of the original founders has started a conservation effort to archive the original Johnny Two Shoes back catalogue. An up to date listing of the games recovered so far can be found on the conservation listing.

Missing games were originally hosted exclusively on the original Johnny Two Shoes website and haven't yet been recovered, although the search continues to bring back titles like Catch of the Day, Banana Dash World 3, The Flying Machine and A Birds Journey.
