= Severed (video game) =

2016 action-adventure video game

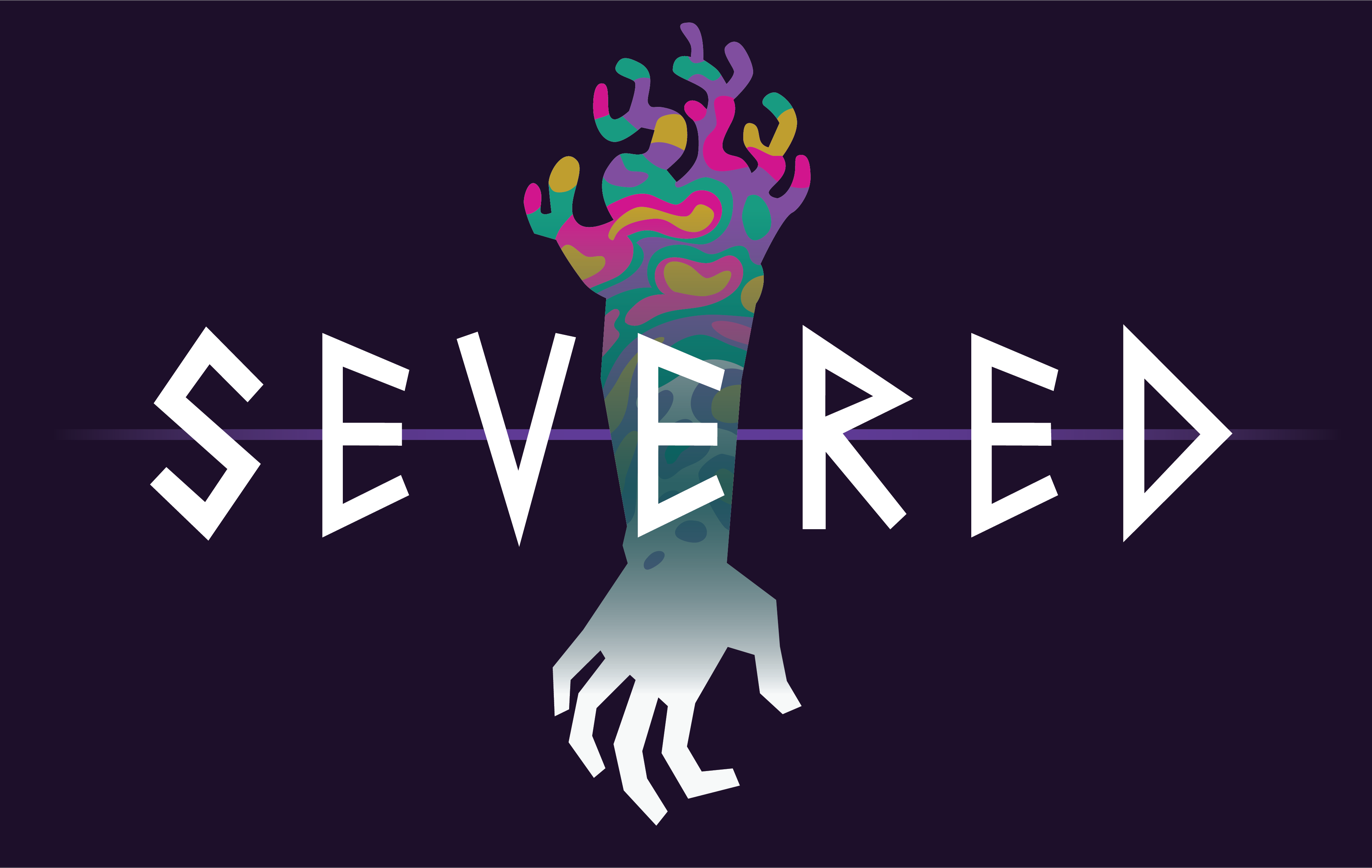
- Developer: DrinkBox Studios
- Publisher: DrinkBox Studios
- Platforms: PlayStation Vita, Wii U, Nintendo 3DS, iOS, Nintendo Switch
- Release: PlayStation Vita; WW: April 26, 2016 Wii U, iOS; WW: September 22, 2016 Nintendo 3DS; EU: September 22, 2016; NA: October 13, 2016 Nintendo Switch; WW: August 8, 2017
- Genre: Action-adventure
- Mode: Single-player

Severed is an action-adventure video game developed and published by DrinkBox Studios for the PlayStation Vita, iOS, Wii U, Nintendo 3DS and Nintendo Switch. It was released on April 26, 2016, in North America and Europe for the PlayStation Vita and it was released on Wii U and iOS on September 22, 2016. It was released on Nintendo 3DS in Europe on September 22, 2016, North America on October 13, 2016. It was released in Japan on December 28, 2016.

== Development ==
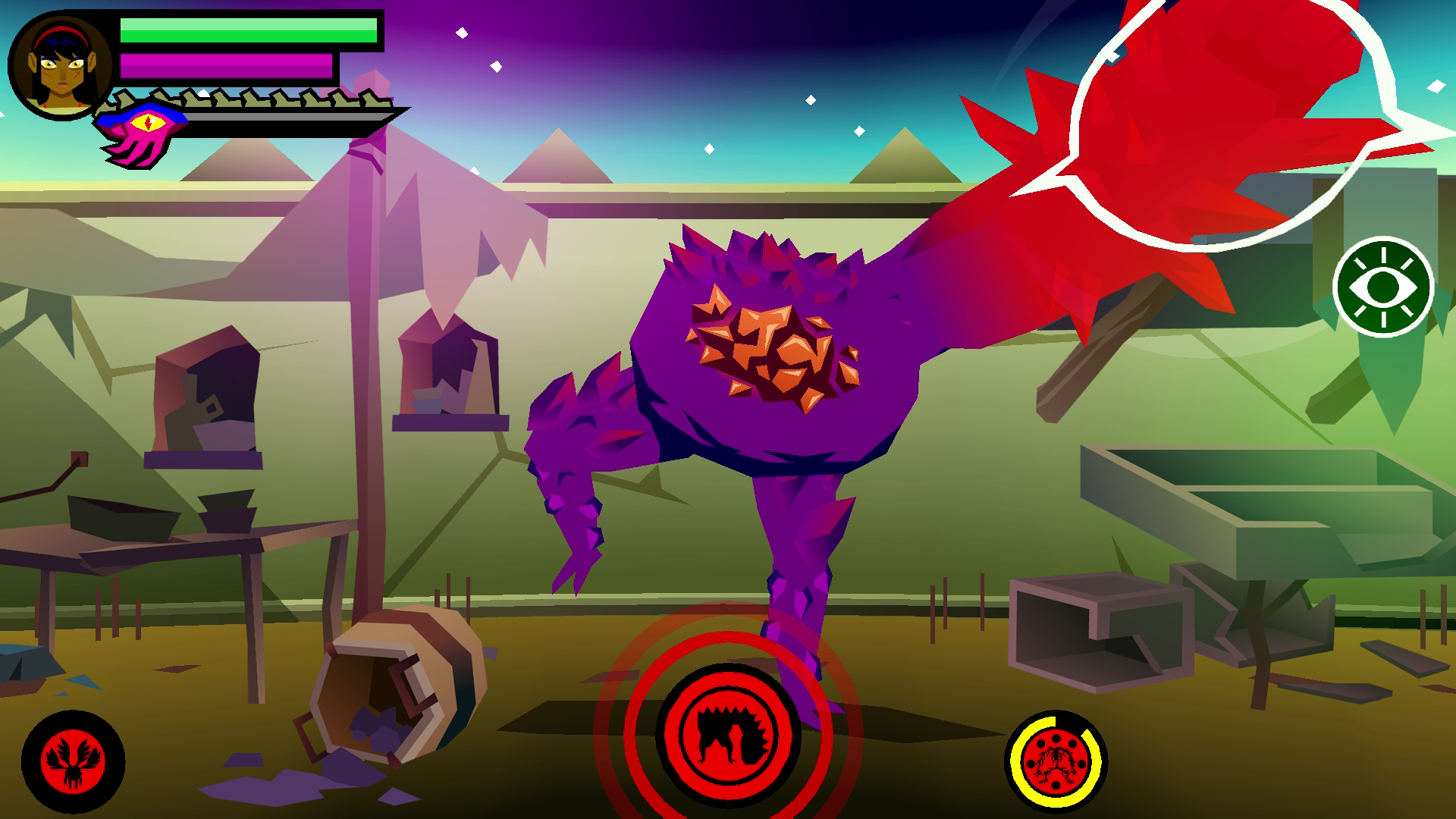
Gameplay screenshot

On April 14, 2014, DrinkBox Studios announced Severed in association with video game blog Destructoid. Because of its heavy focus on touchscreen controls, Severed was anticipated as a game for mobile devices, though DrinkBox Studios was considering versions for other devices like the PlayStation Vita, the Nintendo 3DS and the Wii U, too. Motion-sensing technologies like PlayStation Move and Kinect were considered. However, the developers did not confirm the game for any of these platforms at that time. DrinkBox Studios was aiming for a release of Severed in 2015. At the PlayStation Experience 2014 in December, DrinkBox Studios announced that Severed would be released on PlayStation Vita, continuing the trend of DrinkBox' previous games of releasing on PlayStation platforms first. After being delayed, DrinkBox Studios announced on April 11, 2016, that Severed would be released for PlayStation Vita on April 26.

On June 13, 2016, during the Electronic Entertainment Expo 2016, Severed was announced for both the Wii U and Nintendo 3DS. The game supports cross-buy. The Nintendo Switch version released on August 8, 2017.

== Music ==
The soundtrack of Severed was created as a collaboration between the Juno and Polaris-nominated band Yamantaka // Sonic Titan and Pantayo, and was created with the support of FACTOR and the Government of Canada. Severed's soundtrack took home an award for Best Musical Score from the Canadian Videogame Awards.

== Reception ==
Reception

Aggregate score
| Aggregator | Score |
|---|---|
| Metacritic | VITA: 82/100 iOS: 88/100; WIIU: 83/100; NS: 87/100 |

Review scores
| Publication | Score |
|---|---|
| Destructoid | 9.5/10 |
| Electronic Gaming Monthly | 8.5/10 |
| GameSpot | 8/10 |
| Hardcore Gamer | 4.5/5 |
| IGN | 6.4/10 |
| Polygon | 9/10 |
| TouchArcade | 5/5 |
| USgamer | 4/5 |

The game received "generally favorable" reviews, according to video game review aggregator Metacritic. It was named Apple's 2016 iPad Game of the Year. During the 20th Annual D.I.C.E. Awards, the Academy of Interactive Arts & Sciences nominated Severed for "Handheld Game of the Year".
