= Guacamelee! =

2013 Metroidvania platforming video game

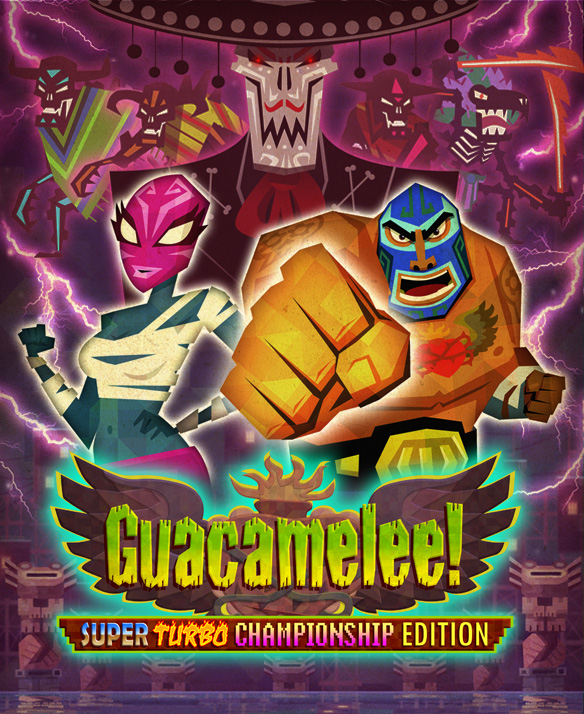
- Super Turbo Championship Edition cover art
- Developers: DrinkBox Studios; Broken Rules (Wii U)
- Publisher: DrinkBox Studios
- Director: Augusto Quijano
- Composers: Rom Di Prisco; Peter Chapman
- Series: Guacamelee!
- Platforms: Windows, OS X, Linux, PlayStation 3, PlayStation 4, PlayStation Vita, Wii U, Xbox 360, Xbox One, Switch
- Release: PlayStation 3, PlayStation Vita: NA: 9 April 2013; EU: 10 April 2013; Gold Edition; Windows; 8 August 2013; OS X, Linux; 18 February 2014; Super Turbo Championship Edition; Windows, PlayStation 4, Wii U, Xbox 360, Xbox One; 2 July 2014; Switch; 8 October 2018
- Genres: Metroidvania, platformer, beat 'em up
- Modes: Single-player, multiplayer

Guacamelee! is a Metroidvania action platforming video game developed and published by DrinkBox Studios, initially launched in April 2013 for platforms PlayStation 3 and PlayStation Vita and was later ported to Windows in August and to OS X and Linux in February 2014. The enhanced Super Turbo Championship Edition was released for Wii U, Windows, PlayStation 4, Xbox One, and Xbox 360 in July 2014 and later on the Nintendo Switch in October 2018. The game is inspired by traditional Mexican culture and folklore, like alebrijes and Day of the Dead.

A sequel, Guacamelee! 2, which includes four-player co-operative gameplay, was released on August 21, 2018.

== Gameplay ==
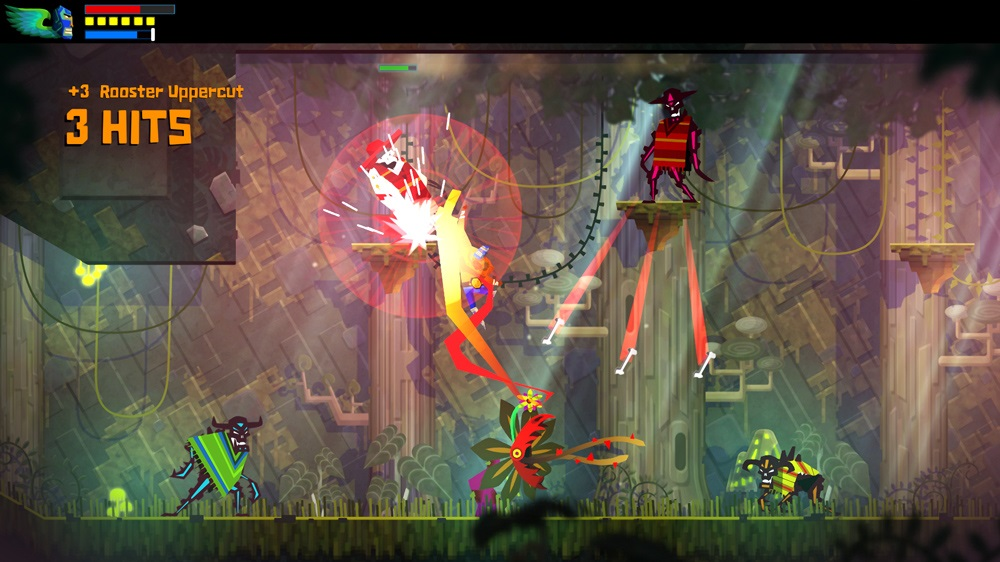

Guacamelee! is a hybrid 2D Metroidvania-style action platform and brawler. Players control the luchador Juan and explore an open, non-linear world to complete the central story objectives while collecting necessary character upgrades and battling enemies. Coins collected from defeated enemies are used to buy new skills at shops, which also double as checkpoints. The game features drop-in co-op play, with the second player assuming the role of Tostada, Guardian of the Mask.

As players progress through the game, Juan breaks open "Choozo statues", a direct reference to Metroid's "Chozo statues", to gain new abilities. Some abilities give Juan new combat options with each move's color corresponding to similarly colored obstacles in the world, requiring Juan to learn specific moves before accessing certain areas. Other abilities include movement upgrades, such as a double jump, a chicken transformation to traverse small corridors, and the ability to cross between the world of the living and the world of the dead to access areas and combat enemies that reside in one plane.

== Plot ==
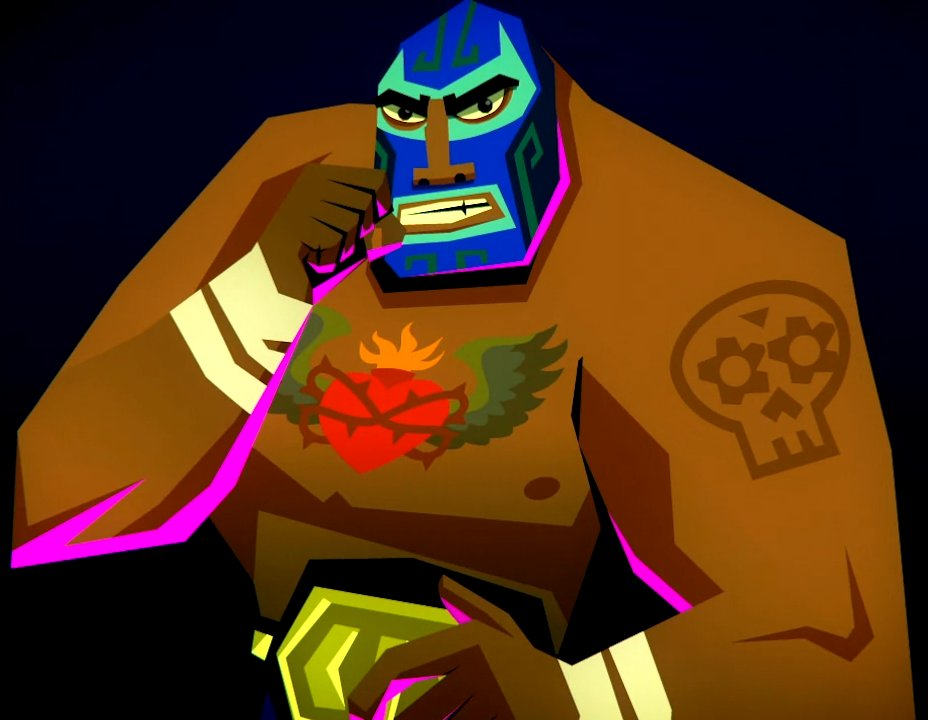
Juan Aguacate, as seen in the game's trailer

Just outside the small Mexican village of Pueblucho, Juan Aguacate is a humble agave farmer. On the Dia de los Muertos (Day of the Dead), he goes into town to meet with his childhood friend and love interest, El Presidente's daughter, Lupita. An evil charro skeleton named Carlos Calaca attacks the village and kidnaps her from el Presidente's Mansion. Juan confronts Carlos but is no match and is killed. He is sent to the land of the dead, a parallel world where the dead reside. There, Juan finds a mysterious luchadora named Tostada. She gives Juan a mystical mask that transforms him into a powerful luchador and brings him back to the world of the living. The game then follows Juan's battle to rescue his beloved and to stop Calaca's plan to sacrifice her in a ritual that would unite the worlds of living and dead under his rule.

While he confronts X'tabay, the first of Calaca's lieutenants, he ends up transformed into a rooster and brought back to human form by another rooster with mysterious powers. After defeating X'tabay, she reforms, revealing that Calaca was once a great rodeo man who broke his arm just before an important competition, and sold his soul to the Devil to have it healed time enough for the competition, but just after winning, the Devil enacts his payment and drags him to hell, but with X'tabay's help he deceived the Devil by having him transformed into the same kind of rooster as Juan, having helped him against Calaca in order to restore his power.

Juan gains the power to confront and defeat the rest of Calaca's forces. Juan pursues Calaca to the altar where the ceremony is being held and defeats him, but does not arrive in time to save Lupita. In the normal ending, Juan returns to his village and lives his life in peace until reuniting with Lupita in the afterlife and the mask disappears. In the true ending, attained if the player clears all the hidden trials, Lupita is revived by the power of Juan's mask which breaks apart, and the two return together to the village where they get married.

== Downloadable Content ==
The Costume Pack was released on June 3, 2013, and includes several new costumes and abilities. The Pollo Luchador costume regenerates health, but stamina regenerates at a slower rate. The skeleton costume includes infinite stamina but does not allow health pickups, except at save points. Lastly, identity swap switches the costumes of Juan and Tostada and makes attacks stronger and throws weaker. The DLC also includes six new trophies/achievements.

El Diablo's Domain was released on July 23, 2013, and contains seventeen challenge areas, three new character outfits and seven new trophies/achievements. Players can earn bronze, silver or gold medals for each challenge, depending on performance. Gold medals require "nothing short of a flawless attempt". Each of the new character outfits requires a certain number of medals to unlock and grants new abilities while being worn by Juan or Tostada. The outfits are: bronze medals unlock El Portero which has powerful throws with weak melee attacks, silver medals unlock Alberije which deals massive damage, but also takes massive damage and lastly gold medals unlock El Diablo which gives more stamina and less health, but attacks give the player health. GameSpot rated the DLC 7.5/10 and said "El Diablo's Domain is a solid addition to an already great game that will make you laugh and push you to your limits, for better or worse."

All downloadable content was later included in both Guacamelee! Gold Edition and Guacamelee! Super Turbo Championship Edition.

== Development ==
The idea of the Mexican theme was originally proposed by the animator. Former IGN editor Colin Moriarty is credited with advising DrinkBox to add D-pad movement to the control scheme, earning a special thanks in the game's end credits.

== Release ==
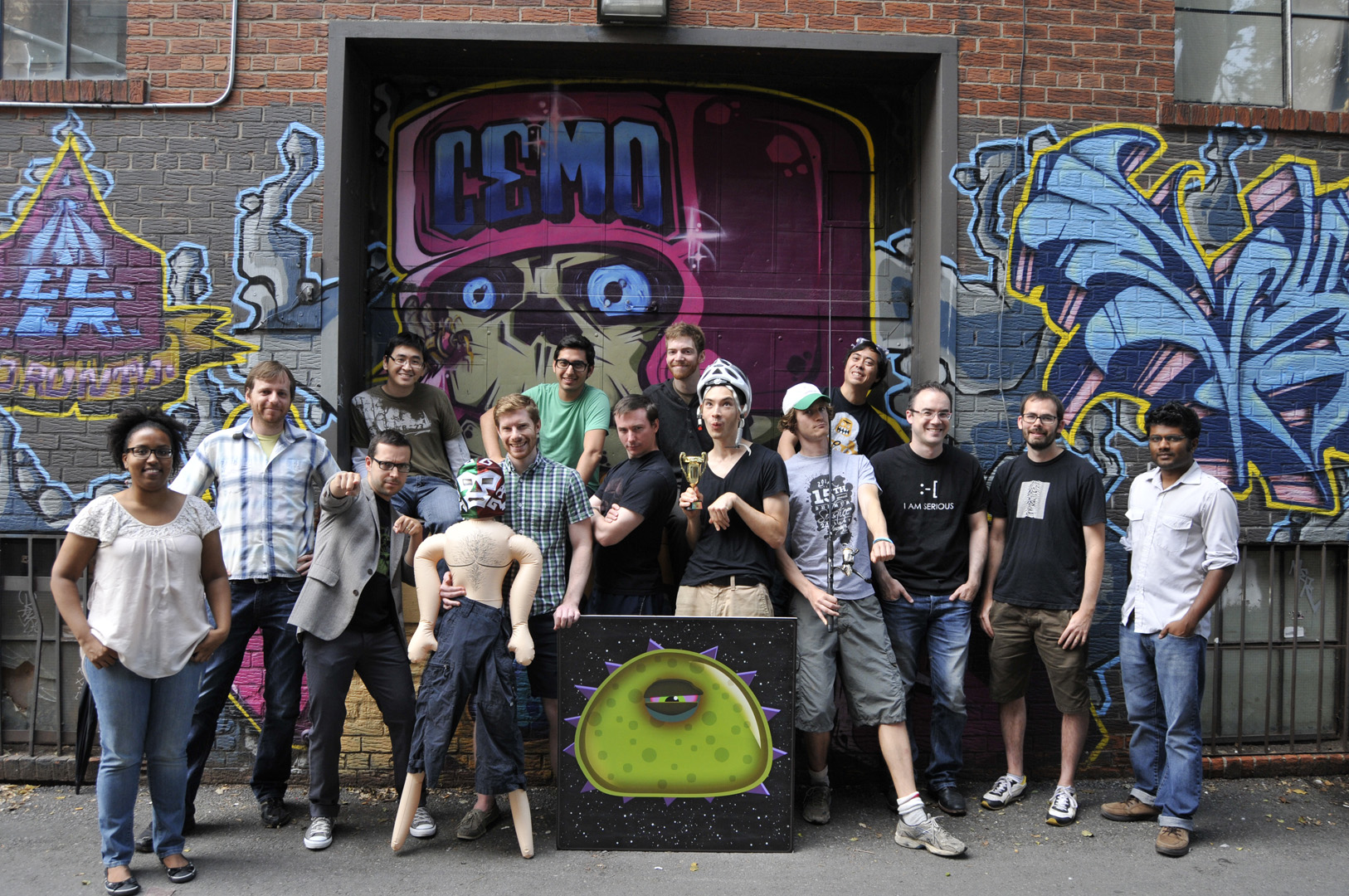
The DrinkBox development team

The game was originally released for PlayStation 3 and PlayStation Vita in April 2013, with cross-buy support and additional missions and costumes released as downloadable content (DLC). Guacamelee! Gold Edition, released on Steam in August, includes that DLC and Steam Workshop support, allowing players to create their own character skins using Adobe Animate and share them online. This version was later released for OS X and Linux in February 2014. Guacamelee! Super Turbo Championship Edition, which adds additional levels and bosses in addition to previous DLC, was released for PlayStation 4, Xbox One, Windows, Xbox 360, and Wii U in July 2014. The game became a PlayStation Plus free release in May 2015.

The Switch version was released on 8 October 2018, with DrinkBox's plans to also bring the sequel Guacamelee! 2 to the Switch before the end of 2018.

In July 2015, DrinkBox Studios teamed with the subscription box company, IndieBox, to distribute an exclusive, custom-designed, individually-numbered physical release of Guacamelee! This limited collector's box includes a flash-drive with a DRM-free game file, official soundtrack, instruction manual, Steam key, and various custom-made collectibles. In August 2017, Vblank Entertainment released a limited retail version of Guacamelee! Super Turbo Championship Edition for the PlayStation 4. This release was limited to 3,800 copies.

== Music ==
The game's soundtrack is composed by Rom Di Prisco and Peter Chapman. The soundtrack includes 30 original tracks for the game with an additional 4 bonus tracks made up of additional mixes and remixes. The soundtrack is inspired by Mexican music that is composed with electronic beats, colorful synths, and EDM inspiration. An LP vinyl pressing of the OST was released, with a select 20 tracks from the original digital release of the soundtrack.

== Reception ==
Reception

Aggregate score
Aggregator	Score
Metacritic	PS3: 84/100; VITA: 87/100; PC (Gold Edition): 88/100; PC (Super Turbo Championship Edition): 80/100; PS4: 87/100; WIIU: 90/100; XONE: 88/100; NS: 86/100

Review scores
Publication	Score
Destructoid	9/10
GameSpot	9/10
IGN	9.0/10
Polygon	9.0/10

Guacamelee! was selected as a nominee at Indiecade in August 2012. The game was also nominated for the 2013 Independent Games Festival for Excellence in Visual Art. IGN gave the game a 9.0, citing that the game's only misfire was the short length.

The Super Turbo Championship Edition of the game received additional reviews when it was released in July 2014. Switch Player's review called this edition of the game "the best way to experience DrinkBox Studios’ best game.", giving it a 4.5 out stars out of 5.

== Legacy ==
Juan and Tostada are playable guest star characters in the Wii U game Runbow. Juan appears in Indivisible as a guest character. Juan also appears as a playable character in the fighting game Brawlout. He was added to Dead Cells.
