= Blade Chimera =

2025 video game

- Developers: Team Ladybug; WSS Playground
- Publishers: Playism; WSS Playground
- Composer: peposoft
- Platforms: Nintendo Switch; Microsoft Windows
- Release: 16 January 2025
- Genre: Action
- Mode: Single-player

Blade Chimera (Note: Japanese: ブレードキメラ) is a 2025 action game developed by Team Ladybug and WSS Playground, and published by Playism and WSS Playground. The player assumes Shin, a warrior who hunts demons in a post-apocalyptic world. It was released on 16 January 2025 for Microsoft Windows and Nintendo Switch.

== Gameplay ==
Blade Chimera is a 2D side-scrolling action game with Metroidvania gameplay, with elements of the exploration-heavy Metroid series and the combat-centric Castlevania series. The player plays as Shin, a warrior equipped with a plasma blaster, and Lux, a demon who takes the form of the magical Lumina Sword and aids Shin with abilities like generating a shield. After the player learns the warp skill, they can fast-travel to almost anywhere on the map.

== Development and release ==
Blade Chimera was developed by Team Ladybug, which were behind Record of Lodoss War: Deedlit in Wonder Labyrinth, Touhou Luna Nights, and Drainus. The developer's previous games influenced the character design of Blade Chimera, where every character has their sense of justice and each is sympathetic. The developer put effort into the game's backgrounds to make the 2D world more immersive.

The game was released on 16 January 2025 for Nintendo Switch and Microsoft Windows.

== Reception ==
Reception

Aggregate scores
| Aggregator | Score |
|---|---|
| Metacritic | NS: 83/100; PC: 77/100 |
| OpenCritic | 83% recommend |

Review scores
| Publication | Score |
|---|---|
| Destructoid | 8/10 |
| Nintendo Life | 9/10 |
| Shacknews | 9/10 |
| Siliconera | 8/10 |

Blade Chimera received "generally favorable" reviews according to review aggregator Metacritic. 83% of critics recommended the game according to OpenCritic.
