= Misao (disambiguation) =

Misao is a unisex Japanese given name.

Misao may also refer to:

- Misao (food), Malagasy fried noodles
- Misao (video game), a 2011 video game
- Misao, a Kuki tribe of Assam
- Misao (magazine), a Serbian magazine

== People with the surname ==
- Kento Misao (三竿 健斗; born 1996), Japanese footballer
- Yuto Misao (三竿 雄斗; born 1991), Japanese footballer
