= Drainus =

2022 video game

- Developer: Team Ladybug
- Publishers: Playism; WSS Playground
- Artist: Zou Nose
- Platforms: Microsoft Windows; Nintendo Switch
- Release: Windows: WW: May 22, 2022; Switch: WW: February 2, 2023
- Genre: Scrolling shooter
- Mode: Single-player

Drainus (Note: Japanese: ドレイヌス, Hepburn: Doreinusu) is a 2022 scrolling shooter video game developed by Team Ladybug, co-published by Playism and WSS Playground for Microsoft Windows. A Nintendo Switch version was released on February 2, 2023. It follows Irina, daughter of an ill slave from planet Halpax under rule of the Kharlal empire led by general Izumo, joined by the humanoid soldier Ghenie on a journey to save her father by stealing a starfighter and overthrow the empire to prevent a galactic war. Controlling the titular fighter ship, the player must fight waves of enemies and bosses, while avoiding collision with their projectiles and other obstacles. The Drainus ship is equipped with a "reflector" that absorbs enemy shots for a brief time period to launch counterattacks and its functions can be enhanced via energy tanks.

Drainus was created by Team Ladybug, a division of Japanese online magazine DenFaminicoGamer which had previously developed Shin Megami Tensei: Synchronicity Prologue (2017), Touhou Luna Nights (2019) and Record of Lodoss War: Deedlit in Wonder Labyrinth (2021). Character art was handled by Zou Nose, who worked on illustrations for the Pokémon Trading Card Game and Magic: The Gathering. The music was scored by a member under the pseudonym "peposoft", who also composed for Luna Nights and Deedlit in Wonder Labyrinth. Unveiled at the Indie Live Expo 2022, the game released the same day it was announced and its launch was supplemented by a soundtrack album. It garnered generally favorable reviews from critics.

== Gameplay ==
Gameplay screenshot (PC version).

Drainus is a scrolling shooter game. The plot revolves around Irina, daughter of an ill slave from planet Halpax, whose inhabitants are under rule of the Kharlal empire led by general Izumo. A humanoid soldier named Ghenie appears before Irina to warn about a galactic war thirty years in the future, where thousands of planets will be destroyed by the empire, and requests her help. Under desperation to save her father from his illness, Irina joins Ghenie and steals the titular starfighter to overthrow the empire. The player takes control of the Drainus space fighter craft over a constantly scrolling background, populated with an assortment of enemy forces and obstacles, and the scenery never stops moving until a boss is reached, which must be fought in order to progress further. The game primarily scrolls horizontally, but there are also sections where the scrolling is vertical.

A key gameplay mechanic to Drainus is its "reflector" system, which is reminiscent of Giga Wing and Ikaruga: The player can press a button at any time to activate a guard shield for a brief time period and absorb purple enemy shots to launch counterattacks depending on how many projectiles were absorbed, and can be deactivated in order to recharge it. However, wrong use of the reflector shield will lead the player taking damage from enemy fire, while certain projectiles cannot be absorbed. The player can also adjust the ship's overall speed by holding down the trigger button. When shot down, enemies drop energy tanks that act as currency to enhance or change various functions of the ship via an upgrade system accessible by pausing the game. The ship is also equipped with bombs capable of obliterating any enemy caught within its blast radius.

== Development and release ==
Drainus was developed by Team Ladybug, a division of Japanese online magazine DenFaminicoGamer which had previously developed Shin Megami Tensei: Synchronicity Prologue (2017), Touhou Luna Nights (2019) and Record of Lodoss War: Deedlit in Wonder Labyrinth (2021). Character art was handled by Zou Nose, who worked on illustrations for the Pokémon Trading Card Game and Magic: The Gathering. The music was scored by a member under the pseudonym "pepesoft", who also composed for Luna Nights and Deedlit in Wonder Labyrinth. It was built using the Mogura Engine 2, used in previous Team Ladybug projects. The group recounted the game's history and creation process in an interview with Famitsu.

Drainus was first unveiled at the Indie Live Expo 2022, a digital showcase for indie games, and released the same day it was announced for PC via Steam, co-published by Playism (a brand of Active Gaming Media) and WSS Playground. The game's launch was supplemented by a soundtrack album. Playism considered a Nintendo Switch version shortly after release, which was confirmed and made playable at Tokyo Game Show 2022. The Switch version released on February 2, 2023, while a physical version by Strictly Limited Games is also planned, featuring multiple language settings.

== Reception ==
Reception

Aggregate score
Aggregator	Score	
Aggregator	NS	PC
Metacritic	83/100	81/100

Review scores
Publication	Score	
Publication	NS	PC
Edge	N/A	8/10
Eurogamer	N/A	Recommended
Famitsu	32/40	N/A
IGN	N/A	7/10
MeriStation	N/A	8.5/10
Nintendo Life	8/10	N/A
Nintendo World Report	8/10	N/A

Drainus garnered "generally favorable" reviews, according to review aggregator Metacritic. Game*Spark's Gurapo Suzuki was surprised by the detailed pseudo-3D sprite visuals and found it easy to play due to the bullet absorption mechanic. Suzuki regarded it as a high quality game and also commended the story. Eurogamer's Martin Robinson expressed that the ability to absorb enemy fire lent it a "more sedate" pacing compared to other shooters. Robinson praised the graphical aesthetic for its cohesive artwork, but criticized oversights during boss battles and the upgrade system. He also commented that more experienced shooter players may be disappointed with its difficulty.

IGN Japan's Susumu Imai labelled it as a well-crafted shooter, commending the spritework and the ship being fun to control. However, Imai felt that it relied heavily on homages and criticized its low difficulty. Rice Digital's Pete Davison gave positive remarks to its narrative component for being compelling and reminiscent of PC shooters such as Traffic Department 2192, customizable power-up system, absorption mechanic, level design, presentation and soundtrack. GameBlast's Farley Santos concurred with both Robinson and Imai about the low difficulty, and saw the occasional "visual chaos" as a negative. Regardless, Santos praised its bullet absorption mechanic, as well as the stage variety, customizable options and atmosphere.

Edge magazine stated that "The confident level design and creative set-pieces, astounding bosses that unfurl into new forms with mesmerising grace, and refined pixel art and animation combine in captivating fashion. To attempt to build a shooter as grand as Gradius V takes some courage; Team Ladybug has the talent as well as the guts." MeriStation's Carlos Forcada shared a similar opinion as with other reviewers regarding the absorption mechanic, but disagreed with the difficulty. Forcada highlighted the game's amalgamation of trends into its own but criticized the music, certain visual details for being less elaborated and overall penalty for dying.
