= Refind Self: The Personality Test Game =

2023 video game

- Developer: Lizardry
- Publishers: Active Gaming Media, Playism
- Platforms: Windows, Nintendo Switch, Android, iOS
- Release: Android, iOS, Windows; 14 November 2023; Switch; 2 October 2024
- Genre: Adventure
- Mode: Single-player

Refind Self: The Personality Test Game is a 2023 video game developed by Lizardry and published by Active Gaming Media and Playism. Upon release, the game received positive reviews, with critics praising the game's concept, characters and writing. Following release, Refind Self received an Honorable Mention for the Nuovo Award at the 2025 Independent Games Festival.

== Gameplay ==
Gameplay screenshot, depicting the outcome of a player's personality test against a radar chart.

Players assume the role of an android who must rebuild their personality following the death of the doctor who created them. The objective of the game is to explore the game world, interact with other characters and play minigames. As players complete these tasks, a heart on the screen fills. Once it is complete, the results of a personality test are presented, selecting 5 of 23 personality archetypes. The archetypes are influenced by player decisions throughout the game, including dialogue choices. Once the analysis is complete, players are able to share the results online with others.

== Development ==
Refind Self was developed by Lizardry, a solo Japanese independent developer, who had previously created the game 7 Days to End With You. The game was released on Steam, Google Play and the Apple App Store on 14 November 2023 for Windows and mobile devices. Following a preview on the Nintendo Indie World Showcase in April 2024, a port of Refind Self for the Nintendo Switch was released on 2 October 2024, which contained additional features for players to share personality results.

== Reception ==
Reception

Review scores
Publication	Score
TouchArcade	4.5/5
Digitally Downloaded	3.5/5

Publisher Playism stated that Refind Self had exceeded commercial expectations, and announced on the second anniversary of the game's release that it had sold over 500,000 copies. Refind Self received an Honorable Mention for the Nuovo Award at the 2025 Independent Games Festival.

Several reviewers praised the execution of the game's concept as a personality quiz. Dave Jones of PC Gamer found the game emotionally resonant, stating "the way that the premise meshes with the narrative is charming", finding the choices helped the player "narratively construct the identity of the protagonist". Mikhail Madnani of Touch Arcade was "enamored with the world" and its "smart storytelling and structure", considering its characters elevated the game's concept, although wrote that the game could be viewed by some players as too short, and wished it featured controller support. Verity Townsend considered the game "moving" and highlighted its "quirky and poignant interactions".
