= Misao =

Unisex Japanese given name

- Gender: Both

Origin
- Origin: Japanese
- Meaning: Different meanings depending on the kanji used

Misao (written: 操 or みさを in hiragana) is a unisex Japanese given name. Notable people with the name include:

- Misao Fujimura (藤村 操; 1886–1903), Japanese philosophy student and poet
- Misao Jo (城 みさを; 1913–2018), Japanese textile artist, weaver and educator
- Misao Katagiri (片桐 操; 1947–1972), Japanese murderer
- Misao Kodate (小舘 操; born 1961), Japanese biathlete
- Misao Ono (小野 操; 1908–?), Japanese high jumper
- Misao Tamai (玉井 操; 1903–1978), Japanese footballer
- Misao Yokota (横田 みさを; born 1917), Japanese swimmer

== Fictional characters ==
- Misao Amano (天野 美紗緒), a character in the anime series Magical Girl Pretty Sammy
- Misao Harada (原田 実沙緒), protagonist of the manga series Black Bird
- Misao Kusakabe (日下部 みさお), a character in the manga series Lucky Star
- Makimachi Misao (巻町 操), a character in the manga series Rurouni Kenshin
- Misao Minakami (水無神 操緒), a character in the light novel series Asura Cryin'
- Misao Sakimori (防人 操), a character in the video game Gate Keepers
- Misao Zaitsu (財津 操), a character in the manga series First Love Limited
- Misao Furukawa (古川 操), a titular main antagonist in the RPG maker horror game Misao
