= Mighty Goose =

2021 video game

- Developers: Blastmode; MP2 Games (consoles)
- Publisher: Playism
- Programmer: Richard Lems
- Artist: Richard Lems
- Composer: Dominic Ninmark
- Engine: Construct 3
- Platforms: Windows; macOS; Linux; PlayStation 4; PlayStation 5; Switch; Xbox One; Xbox Series X/S
- Release: June 5, 2021
- Genre: Run and gun
- Modes: Single-player, multiplayer

Mighty Goose is a run and gun video game developed by Blastmode and published by Playism. It was released for Windows, macOS, Linux, PlayStation 4, PlayStation 5, Nintendo Switch, Xbox One, Xbox Series X/S. The game follows Mighty Goose, a bounty hunter travelling across the galaxy to defeat the Void King.

Development of Mighty Goose took two years, and overlapped the development of a game called Kunai. Richard Lems worked on the game alone for around half a year, and MP2 Games ported Mighty Goose to consoles. The team later hired a composer, QA team, and signed with Playism. The game took inspiration from Metal Slug, and an in-game level took inspiration from Mad Max. Mighty Goose received mixed reviews from critics.

== Gameplay ==
Mighty Goose fires a shotgun at a group of enemies.

Mighty Goose follows Mighty Goose chasing after a villain known as the Void King. The game can be played in local cooperative mode. Mighty Goose can take four hits before dying. Enemies can drop coins and healing items. Coins can be used to purchase weapons and vehicles. The player can activate various abilities to aid them in battle, such as the ability to increase their movement. The player can also select a secondary weapon. Players can bring companions into each level. The companions can be controlled by AI or a second player.

At the start of each level, Mighty Goose is equipped with an arm cannon. Mighty Goose can pick up special weapons such as a machine gun, a shotgun, a rocket launcher, and a tesla coil. These weapons have a limited amount of ammunition. Shooting downwards allows Mighty Goose to hover for a short amount of time. Special attacks can be unlocked, such as summoning minions, or instantly filling the player's Mighty Meter. The Mighty Meter fills up as Mighty Goose attacks enemies. When the Mighty Meter is full, it can be activated, making Mighty Goose deal more damage and become invincible. Some areas may task the player with activating a switch to open a door. Mighty Goose can perform a dodge roll that allows them to avoid damage. Most levels end with a boss fight. The player can revisit stages to improve performance and earn higher rankings.

== Development and release ==
Mighty Goose was developed by Richard Lems, who previously worked on Kunai, an action platformer. The game's development took two years, and overlapped Kunai's development by a year. Lems worked on the game alone for around half a year, and met MP2 Games, who would offer to port the game to consoles. A QA team and composer were hired, and the developers signed with Playism. It took 1.5 more years to complete the game's development. The core of Mighty Goose took inspiration from Metal Slug. A level from the game, where Mighty Goose has to jump from vehicle to vehicle in a convoy, took inspiration from Mad Max. The character of Mighty Goose was created from Lems' character sketches in a Moleskine-style book. One of the characters was a goose wearing power armor. Lems was unaware that Untitled Goose Game was in development, stating that he was "facing a dilemma" on whether to change the character.

Mighty Goose was announced in September 2020 for PC, PlayStation 4, Xbox One, and Switch, and was scheduled to release in 2021. Mighty Goose launched on June 5 for PlayStation 4, PlayStation 5, Xbox One, Switch, and PC. Mighty Goose was added to Xbox Game Pass on September 30. In November, Mighty Goose was one of 17 games to receive Xbox Touch Controls. In January 2022, a trailer was released for an update that would add a water-themed stage to the game. The update was planned to release in Q1 2022, then released on April 19. The levels could be unlocked after completing Mighty Goose's campaign.

== Reception ==
Reception

Aggregate score
Aggregator	Score
Metacritic	PC: 71/100 (Note: Score based on 7 reviews.); Switch: 74/100 (Note: Score based on 15 reviews.)

Review scores
Publication	Score
Famitsu	9/10, 8/10, 8/10, 8/10
Nintendo Life	7/10
Nintendo World Report	6/10
Push Square	7/10
TouchArcade	3.5/5

Mighty Goose received "mixed or average" reviews, according to review aggregator Metacritic. Reviewers from Famitsu gave Mighty Goose scores of 9, 8, 8, and 8.

TouchArcade's Shaun Musgrave called Mighty Goose "fun" and a "real run-and-gun treat while it lasts". He praised the pixel art, calling it "excellent". However, Musgrave felt that the game was "too slight for its own good", but wrote that it ended "where it needs to". He believed that there could be "bits of frustration" due to the placing of the checkpoints. Jordan Rudek of Nintendo World Report wrote that the game made a "good impression", but felt that the "repetitive" gameplay and "lacking" arsenal made the game a "tough recommendation". However, Rudek described the performance, pixel art, and soundtrack as "solid", and believed that the base and menus were presented well.

Writing for Nintendo Life, Ollie Reynolds described Mighty Goose as a "visual treat" with "slick gunplay" and "excellent" enemy designs. He wrote that Mighty Goose offered a "flavour" of games such as Metal Slug and Mercenary Kings. However, Reynolds criticized the checkpoints, calling them "a tad harsh". Robert Ramsey from Push Square also criticized the checkpoints, writing that the pacing "can lead to frustration".

Shacknews included the game as an honorable mention for its Top 10 Indie Games of the Year 2021 list.

=== Nominations ===
Mighty Goose received a nomination in Best Overseas Games at indiePlay 2021, and a nomination for Best Debut Game at the 2021 Dutch Game Awards.
