= Momodora =

Video game series

- Genres: Platform; Metroidvania
- Developer: Bombservice
- Publishers: rdein (Momodora I–Momodora III); AGM PLAYISM (Momodora: Reverie Under the Moonlight–Momodora: Moonlit Farewell)
- First release: Momodora; August 08, 2010
- Latest release: Momodora: Moonlit Farewell; January 11, 2024

Momodora is a series of platform games developed by Guilherme "rdein" Martins and his studio Bombservice. The series follows several priestess heroines who utilize magic maple leaves as weapons against monsters and other cursed entities. The series consists of five games: Momodora I, Momodora II, Momodora III, Momodora: Reverie Under the Moonlight, and Momodora: Moonlit Farewell.

The games take place in an unnamed world inhabited by strange monsters and people. Dark, ruinous forces threaten the people of the land who resort to the ritual martyrdom of priestesses to propitiate evil. These evil forces and sacrifices serve as the main sources of conflict throughout the series.

The first two games in the series are short freeware titles exclusive to itch.io. The third, fourth and fifth games in the series were released to Steam, where they saw comparatively greater popularity.

== Main series ==
Aggregate review scores As of November 10, 2017.
Game	GameRankings	Metacritic
Momodora	–	–
Momodora II	–	–
Momodora III	–	–
Momodora: Reverie Under the Moonlight	(PC) 85.00% (PS4) 77.44% (XONE) 76.00%	(PC) 82 (PS4) 76 (XONE) 77

Release timeline
2010	Momodora
2011	Momodora II
2012
2013
2014	Momodora III
2015
2016	Momodora: Reverie Under the Moonlight
2017
2018
2019
2020
2021
2022
2023
2024	Momodora: Moonlit Farewell

=== Momodora and Momodora II (2010-2011) ===
In Momodora, Isadora Doralina, an orphaned girl, goes on a journey to resurrect her dead mother who was lost to the land of Koho's ritual sacrifices. She goes in search of a sacred item rumored to have the power to bring the dead back to life for a "certain price". Mike Rose of IndieGames.com noted that it was heavily influenced by Cave Story, as well as other games like Mega Man, Metal Slug and The Legend of Zelda, describing the ritual as "strange and unsettling".

In Momodora II, the game's direct sequel, Momo, a different priestess from Koho Village, must banish an evil plaguing her people. This entry attempts a more open-ended style of exploration gameplay than the previous game's more "arcade" style progression.

=== Momodora III (2014) ===
Momodora III was the first in the series to launch on Steam, and the first to be paid software. The story follows two maidens, Momo and Dora, who are sent to investigate strange apparitions appearing around the village of KoHo. This entry returns to the first game's style of linear progression, and is the only one to feature two playable characters. There are a variety of equippable items and secrets. It sequentially follows the other two games.

=== Momodora: Reverie Under the Moonlight (2016) ===
Reverie Under the Moonlight serves as a prequel to the previous games, and is a Metroidvania that is gothic horror in tone. Kaho, a priestess from the village of Lun, investigates a strange plague contaminating her village and seeks audience with the Queen in the corrupted Karst City in order to beseech her aid.

=== Momodora: Moonlit Farewell (2024) ===
Momodora: Moonlit Farewell was announced in January 2022 as the final game in the Momodora series, taking place five years following the events of Momodora III. Momo Reinol, the high priestess of Koho, is sent to find a bell-ringer who is summoning demons to attack the village. Despite being a sequel to the original trilogy, it is designed so that no "catching up" is required for those who have only played Reverie Under the Moonlight.

== Related games ==
=== Minoria (2019) ===
A spiritual sequel to the Momodora series, although unrelated in story, it revolves around two warrior nuns who are sent to rescue a kingdom from heretical witches. Like Reverie Under the Moonlight, its setting has gothic horror elements.
