= Deeeer Simulator =

- Developer: Gibier Games
- Publisher: Playism
- Platforms: Nintendo Switch; PlayStation 4; Windows; Xbox One
- Release: November 25, 2021
- Genre: Sandbox
- Mode: Single-player

Deeeer Simulator (stylized as DEEEER Simulator) is a 2021 sandbox video game developed by Gibier Games and published by Playism. It was first released for Windows on January 20, 2020, left early access and released for Windows, Nintendo Switch, PlayStation 4, and Xbox One on November 25, 2021. Inspired by Goat Simulator, despite its billing as a "simulator" and the subtitle "Your Average Everyday Deer Game", it is a comedic and surreal game in which the player is reincarnated as a deer and can either explore a stylized city or destroy it using a variety of supernatural powers, such as a stretchy "grappling hook" neck, while looking for hidden secrets. The game went viral for its humorous, unconventional gameplay, but received mixed reviews from critics, who noted its lack of content or goals, describing it as more of a toy.

== Reception ==
TJ Denzer of Shacknews called Deeeer Simulator "freaking ridiculous [...] mostly in a good way", describing it as "ridiculously over-the-top" and wishing there was more content to the game. He noted issues controlling the deer, describing it as "so jank that sometimes it makes the gameplay feel sluggish or sloppy", and saying that it went beyond humor and into annoyance. Shaun Musgrave of TouchArcade described it as "more of a silly toy" than a typical game, calling it funny but saying it tried too hard to elicit humor. Kotaku said that the game quickly won the reviewer over due to its silliness, while Dominic Tarason of Rock Paper Shotgun called its humor more "earnest" than that of Goat Simulator. Patricia Hernandez of Polygon described the game as "social media catnip".
