= Rusted Moss =

- Key art
- Developers: faxdoc; happysquared; sunnydaze
- Publisher: Playism
- Platforms: Windows; Nintendo Switch; PlayStation 5; Xbox Series X&S
- Release: Windows: April 12, 2023; Nintendo Switch, PlayStation 5, Xbox Series X & S: June 20, 2024
- Genre: Metroidvania
- Mode: Single-player

Rusted Moss is a 2023 Metroidvania video game. The game has the player control Fern, who wakes up in a world that has become a wasteland of aged machinery and long-forgotten creatures called Fae. Equipped with weaponry, she explores the world, battling the various remaining machinery and Fae she comes across to recover the stolen pieces of an entity known as Titania.

The game involves the player exploring a 2D, maze-like environment, collecting items along the way to further progress. The controls and main form of attacking in the game are controlled by a reticle, which allows the player to fire their weaponry as well as aim a grappling hook to traverse the environment. It was developed by the three-person team, credited as happysquared and sunnydaze from Singapore, and faxdoc from Norway.

Rusted Moss was published by Playism and released in 2023 to home computers via Steam. It was released to various video game consoles the following year. Rusted Moss garnered "generally favorable reviews", according to review aggregator website Metacritic with reviewers commenting on the grappling hook mechanic and the game's higher level of difficulty.

== Gameplay ==
Rusted Moss has been described as a Metroidvania. Metroidvanias are typically 2D platformer games where a player controls a character who navigates a large maze-like environment. The environment features items and other collectables that allow the player to upgrade their character or grant new abilities to reach new areas of a maze. As the player explores, they have a map that expands in detail as the player explores the maze. While exploring, the player can encounter boss battles as well as unexpected connections between areas on the map that were previously inaccessible.

Russ Frushtick of Polygon said that the game both "follows and dramatically departs from the many Metroidvanias that came before it.", specifically by adding 360-degree aiming for combat and traversal. The player controls the reticle, allowing them to fire and charge shots from their various weapons as well as aim a grappling hook. There are six types of weapons in the game, ranging from pistols, shotguns, and rocket launchers that allow for different ranges of attacks. The grappling hook becomes the main mode of traversal to reach new areas. The player can not retract, extend, or re-launch it in mid-air. For the PC release, attacks can be controlled using a keyboard and mouse, with the player using the mouse to aim and fire. This can be adjusted to be controlled with a stick controller.

== Plot ==
Rusted Moss is set in a world that once harboured mankind and has become a wasteland of aged machinery. It is invaded by long-forgotten witches called Fae, as well as various rusting machine-based weapons.

In a desperate bid to survive, humans have empowered their own witches with stolen fae magic. One is Fern, who explores the land accompanied by a shadowy figure named Puck. Their goal is to recover the stolen pieces of Titania and end what they describe as the "Age of Men". Throughout Fern's journey, they encounter humans and fae folk, as well as lost shrines and abandoned computer stations that reveal secrets and the long-forgotten history of the world.

== Development ==
Rusted Moss was developed by a core team of three people. was co-developed by the Norwegian designer faxdoc with the help of two creators from the Singaporean studio Happy Bunnies. The two Singaporean creators are sisters named Heather and Megan, who are credited as happysquared and sunnydaze, respectively. Prior to Rusted Moss, faxdoc had created several indie games on itch.io.

happysquared said that faxdoc was the only developer who worked on the game full-time and said that she did "basically 99% of the art and basically all of the programming." Sunnydaze created the music and sound in the game and part of the story. Happysquared worked on the narrative and some game design and art assets.

The game was initially developed for play with computer keyboard and mouse, with an option to play with a controller only later in development.

== Release and reception ==
Reception

Aggregate score
Aggregator	Score
Metacritic	78/100 (PC)

Review score
Publication	Score
Famitsu	7/10, 8/10, 8/10, 6/10 (XBX/S)

Rusted Moss was first released for Windows via Steam on April 12, 2023. Happysquared and sunnydaze both said they felt very anxious prior to the original release of the game, as it was the largest game either of them had worked on and the extra work that had to be done just prior to release. Rusted Moss was later released for the Nintendo Switch, PlayStation 5, Xbox Series X and Series S on June 20, 2024. New areas were added to the game to coincide with the console release.

The Windows version of the Rusted Moss garnered "generally favorable reviews", according to review aggregator site Metacritic. Reviewers commented on the use of the grappling hook for movement. Russ Frushtick of Polygon said that most grappling hooks in video games are predictable and the traversal mechanic in the game made for more unique exploration than most Metroidvanias. The game was reviewed by four reviewers in the Japanese magazine Famitsu and one sole reviewer on their website. Both reviews mentioned that the grappling hook would take some considerable skill and time to master, with the latter reviewer recommending that players play with a mouse and keyboard. The Famitsu reviewers said that while the in-game difficulty adjustments granted the player abilities such as invincibility or flight to curb the difficulty they said that they felt humiliating and decreased the level of enjoyment in the game.

Two of the reviewers in Famitsu magazine found the game stimulated their curiosity in the story, as the game starts with little backstory, which made exploring the world more enjoyable. The online reviewer for Famitsu found it difficult to engage with Fern and suggested the story may be more appealing to players with knowledge of fairies in old folklore.

Dominic Tarason of PC Gamer said that the game was their runner-up for the best hidden gem platformer game of 2023 after Gravity Circuit (2023). Tarason wrote that "Were it not for Gravity Circuit's toe-tapping tunes, Rusted Moss would have had its crown."
