= Hyde Park Theatre =

Coordinates: 30.3082°N 97.7341°W

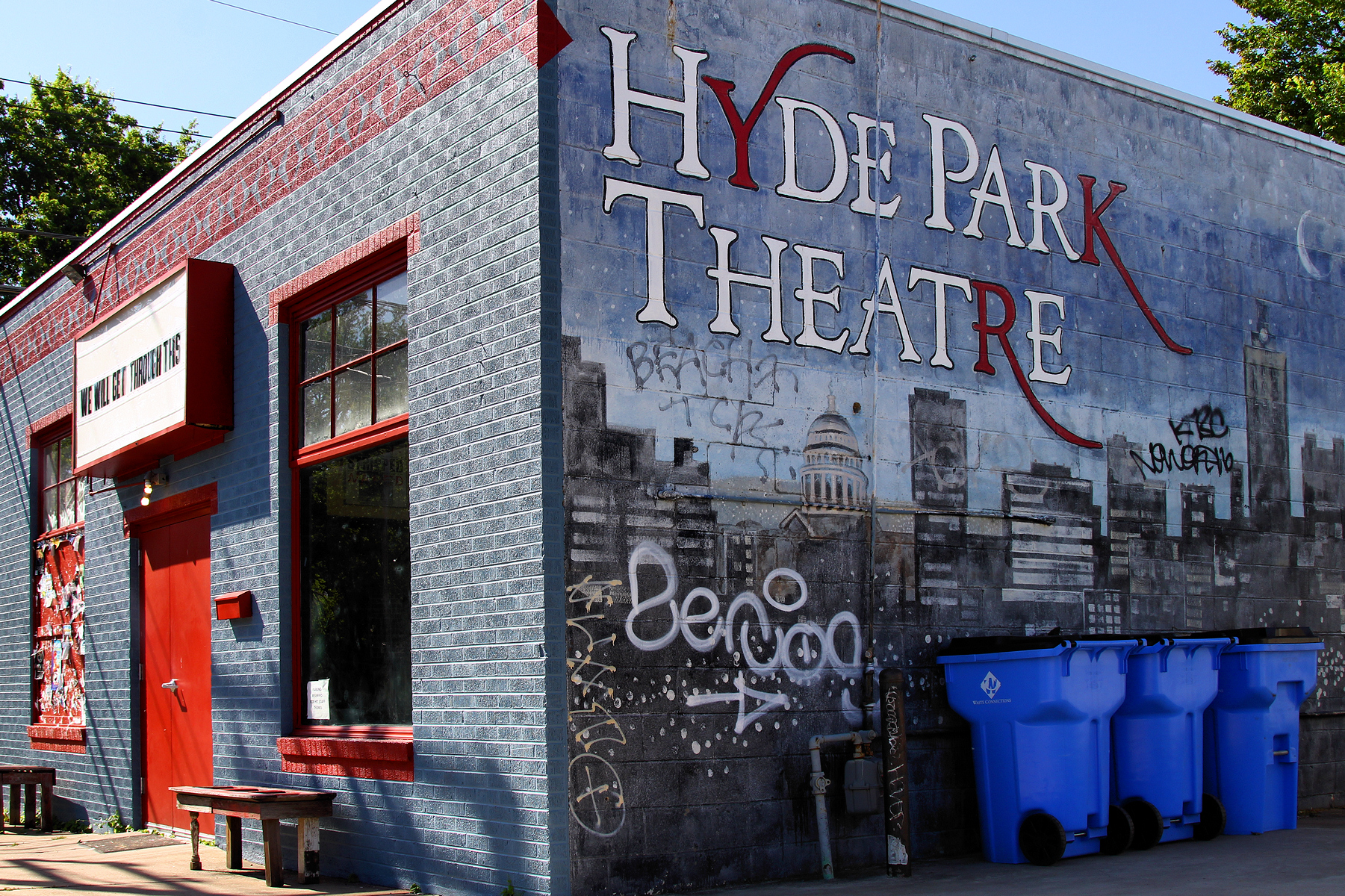
The Hyde Park Theatre Building

Founded in 1992, Hyde Park Theatre (formerly Frontera@Hyde Park Theatre) is an arts center in Austin, Texas, that has produced over 50 world and regional premieres. In addition to a mainstage season, HPT curates the largest performance festival in the Southwest, FronteraFest.

The quality of their work has been acknowledged by 46 Critics' Table Awards, 26 B. Iden Payne Awards, 4 NEA Awards, three TCG National Artist Residencies, feature articles in American Theater and Yale Theatre Magazine. Their production of The Drawer Boy was awarded the 2004 B. Iden Payne Award for Outstanding Drama and the Critics' Table Award for Outstanding Comedy. Their production of Vigil won the 2003 B. Iden Payne Award for Outstanding Comedy. Hyde Park Theatre received 13 Critics' Table Award nominations in 2003 and 9 Critics' Table Award nominations in 2004 and in 2005. Thirteen of their company members were named to the Austin Chronicle's list of Austin's top 40 stage actors.

Artistic Director Ken Webster has received 46 B. Iden Payne Award nominations and 13 B. Iden Payne Awards. He received the B. Iden Payne Award for Outstanding Direction in 2003, 2004, and 2007. In 2003, he received a Critics' Table Award for directing the world premiere of Something Someone Someplace Else by Ann Marie Healy and Marion Bridge by Daniel MacIvor. He is the only director to have been honored with B. Iden Payne Awards for directing in each of the last 3 decades. Webster was inducted into the Austin Arts Hall of Fame on June 5, 2006.

Between their mainstage season, FronteraFest, and rental shows, between 16,500 and 21,000 people visit Hyde Park Theatre annually, and over a thousand artists present their work. HPT is member of Theatre Communications Group, and serves as the umbrella organization for Da! Theatre Collective and the performance home to many of Austin's best alternative artists and companies.
