= Homura Hime =

- Developer: Crimson Dusk
- Publisher: Playism
- Platforms: Windows; Nintendo Switch 2
- Release: Windows; 4 March 2026; Switch 2; 2027
- Genre: Action
- Mode: Single-player

Homura Hime (Note: Japanese: 炎姫) is a 2026 action game developed by Crimson Dusk and published by Playism. It revolves around the titular Homura, the Flame Princess who embarks on a mission to eliminate the five archdemon girls, the demonic fiends that threaten to corrupt the world.

The game was released for Windows on 4 March 2026. A port for Nintendo Switch 2 is planned to release in 2027.

== Gameplay ==
Homura Hime is an action game where you control Homura, who can use a set of weapons. Her combat ability is composed of basic attacks and parry. The parry can be combined with four different moves. A various set of combos can be executed with these moves by mixing up light and heavy attacks, such as juggling an opponent in the air or her sword flying around to attack enemies on its own. Homura can also use skills that do extra damage and have beneficial effects, but they are on a cooldown. Attacking enemies continuously builds up a hit metter that increases the player score. Additional moves are unlockable through currency earned in the game.

Each level contains a different archdemon that must be defeated. The game contains bullet hell elements.

== Development and release ==
Homura Hime was developed by Crimson Dusk, a small-scale development team based in Taiwan. The game started as a solo project by Sam, but as the project started to gain traction online, Crimson Dusk was established to expand the scale of development. The developer strove to introduce elements that could differentiate Homura Hime from other action games, and eventually settled on adding parry mechanics and bullet hell gameplay.

The game was first announced in 2022 with release window for 2023. It was released on 4 March 2026 for Windows. A port for Nintendo Switch 2 is planned to be published in 2026.

== Reception ==
Reception

Aggregate scores
Aggregator	Score
Metacritic	(PC) 74/100
OpenCritic	62% recommend (Note: Based on 20 reviews)

The PC version of Homura Hime received "mixed or average" reviews from critics, according to the review aggregation website Metacritic. Fellow review aggregator OpenCritic assessed that the game received strong approval, being recommended by 62% of critics.
