= Mad Father =

2012 video game

- Developer: Sen
- Publisher: Miscreant's Room
- Engine: Wolf RPG Editor
- Platforms: Windows (Steam); Nintendo Switch (remake)
- Release: Windows: WW: 10 December 2012; Nintendo Switch: WW: 5 November 2020
- Genres: Survival horror, role-playing, puzzle
- Mode: Single-player

Mad Father (Japanese: マッドファーザー, Hepburn: Maddofāzā) is a survival horror role-playing puzzle video game. The game was developed by Japanese developer Sen, published by Miscreant's Room and released on 10 December 2012. The game centers around an 11-year-old girl named Aya, who breaks into her father's secret laboratory to uncover the horrifying truth of his research. A light novel adaption was published in 2014. A Steam version, published by AGM Playism, was released on 23 September 2016.

== Gameplay ==
The player controls Aya, the protagonist. Aya can explore the entire manor where the game is set. To access some rooms, however, it is necessary to solve puzzles or find items. Enemies can attack Aya, but the player can escape them through Quick Time Events before the protagonist's life ends. Scattered throughout the mansion, the player can also find gem-shaped collectibles through side challenges, which can be used to unlock an additional scene after the credits.

== Plot ==
In Northern Germany, a shy, 11-year-old Aya Drevis lives with her father Alfred and their maid Maria. Her father performs secret research in his laboratory in the house's basement, with the assistance of Maria. Aya is aware that Alfred experiments on and kills humans in the basement, as well as the fact that he is involved in an extramarital affair with the younger Maria, a former homeless woman he had taken off the street some years prior, who he originally planned to use as a test subject for his experiments until she changed his mind.

On the anniversary of her mother Monika's death, the very beginning of the game, Aya awakens at midnight to find herself surrounded by test subjects that escaped from the laboratory. Fleeing back into her room, Aya encounters a mysterious salesman, Ogre, who offers her the task of solving puzzles to break into her father's laboratory and uncover his secret. At the end of these puzzles, Aya discovers that her father had intended to perform taxidermy on her and convert her into a doll, as he had done to numerous other children, having been enamored with preserving humans after having killed his own mother as a youth. Aya soon discovers that her father killed her mother in fear of her mother taking Aya away to prevent him from performing taxidermy on her after her mother found out about his plans to turn Aya into a doll.

The game has three endings based on the player's choices. In one ending, Aya allows her undead mother to take her father away to another world. After returning to the real world, she runs into Maria, who knocks her out, takes her to the basement and then kills her, turning her corpse into a doll. In the second ending, Aya saves her father from being taken by her mother's spirit. However, after doing so, Monika reveals to Aya that Alfred murdered her for one of his experiments. Horrified, Aya flees while being chased by a chainsaw-wielding Alfred. While attempting to escape, she runs into Maria. Maria attempts to follow her, but when she fails to capture her, Alfred attacks Maria. The game then branches into two endings depending on Aya's actions; if Aya neglects to help Maria and instead attempts to escape the mansion, she is found by her father and killed, with Alfred performing taxidermy on her corpse and rendering her into one of his dolls. In the true ending, Aya helps Maria, declaring that the two shall henceforth live together. Maria then kills Alfred and the two women leave the mansion, which is burned down by Robin, the spirit of one of Alfred's human test subjects.

While walking away from the burning mansion, Aya notices that her father's medical book has survived the blaze, and decides to take it with her as she and Maria start their lives anew. Meanwhile, inside the burning house, Ogre transports Alfred's spirit to another world, where he is free to experiment to his heart's content, creating a mature adult clone of his daughter, leading into the events of Misao. Some years later, Aya and Maria have created a clinic, where they perform medical services free of charge. A poor woman named Jean Rooney arrives for an examination, and Aya uses anesthesia to render Jean unconscious, claiming that Jean will no longer suffer from her illnesses. In another room, Maria muses that Aya has become just like her father and that the tendencies run in the family, heavily implying that Aya has followed in her father's footsteps.

In an extra scene at the end of the game, you can play through an ending called "if" where the player can play as Robin. It is revealed in this scene that Robin is actually a living boy, brought back to life by Monika's power.

In the Remake of the game, a new epilogue is included, with an adult Aya trapped in a nightmare version of the house. It is revealed that Aya was actually evil from the start, as she has flashbacks to hurting animals, with her father telling her to say sorry when she hurts something, leading her to say sorry even though she doesn't mean it throughout the main game. Through diary entries, journal entries, and letters scattered throughout the house, it is revealed that Monika was trying to make the perfect successor to her family's demonic tendencies and that Aya inherited her tendencies and not Alfred's. Through Monika's letters with her grandfather, it is revealed that she met Alfred in prison, and arranged to marry him and have a child when he got out, as he was a serial killer at the time, making him a perfect choice. Alfred finds out about it years later, and it leads to him planning to turn Aya into a doll with Maria, ending Monika's cursed bloodline, and Monika planning to run away with Aya, leading into the main game. Aya manages to escape the house once again and scoffs at it as it burns down, and she wakes up in her clinic, ready to start a new day.

== Remake ==
A remake of the game was released on November 5, 2020, for Nintendo Switch and PC via Steam.

== Reception ==
Reception

Review scores
Publication	Score
Down Right Creepy	80/100
Jay Is Games	4.4/5
Prima Games	9/10

Mad Father has received positive reviews. Chris Priestman of Indie Statik called it a "well-told story" and a "fantastic horror game". Screen Rant writer Anastasia Wilds ranked Mad Father the 7th-best RPG Maker horror game, and wrote that it will "terrify gamers while also challenging them with its tough difficulty." She also wrote that there are "great twists in the narrative". TheGamer included Mad Father on the list "10 Best Japanese Indie Games", writing that "there's something about Mad Father that somehow conjures true fear, even in the limited 8-bit visuals it presents itself in."
