= Tokoyo: The Tower of Perpetuity =

2022 video game

- Developer: //commentout
- Publisher: Playism
- Platforms: Windows; Nintendo Switch
- Release: WW: 2 June 2022
- Genre: Roguelike
- Mode: Single-player

Tokoyo: The Tower of Perpetuity (Note: Japanese: 常世ノ塔, Hepburn: Tokoyo no tō) is a 2022 Japanese side-scrolling roguelike action game developed by //commentout and published by Playism for Windows and Nintendo Switch. Players climb the titular Tower of Perpetuity with the goal of reaching the summit. The game had a mixed reception.

== Gameplay ==
Tokoyo: The Tower of Perpetuity is a side-scrolling action roguelike game. Players climb the titular Tower of Perpetuity with the goal of reaching the summit. Along the way, they encounter enemies and hazards that must be evaded or defeated. The layout of the tower changes daily; players compete for the top score on the online leaderboard for each iteration. Players choose one of the five playable characters to climb the tower with, Cocoa, Imibi, Kanae, Kukuri, or Shippo de Tail, each with their own unique abilities.

The game lacks a basic attack. Instead, players must use time-limited special abilities in combat or evade enemies completely. Runs culminate in a bullet hell style boss fight where player characters must dodge barrages of bullet attacks. Players are encouraged to advance quickly in the tower by a karma system that sends powerful enemies toward them if they take too long.

== Development ==
Tokoyo: The Tower of Perpetuity was developed by a Japanese indie game developer //commentout. The game was first exhibited at the 2017 Tokyo Game Show and initially released as an early access PC title on Steam in November 2020. In June 2022, a full version of the game was published for PC and Nintendo Switch by Playism in English, Japanese, and Simplified Chinese. The game was influenced by Rogue Legacy, Risk of Rain, and Dark Souls.

== Reception ==
Reception

Aggregate scores
Aggregator	Score
Metacritic	NS: 74/100
OpenCritic	67%

Review scores
Publication	Score
IGN	7/10
TouchArcade	4/5
Siliconera	7/10

Tokoyo: The Tower of Perpetuity received "mixed or average reviews", according to the review aggregator website Metacritic, which calculated a weighted average rating of 74/100 for the Nintendo Switch version based on six critic reviews. Aggregator OpenCritic found that 67% of 9 critics recommended the game.

IGN Japan rated the game 7/10 points, commending the concept of changing tower layouts but finding them still too repetitive in the long run. Jenni Lada, writing for Siliconera, also rated the game 7/10 points. She called it a "novel challenge", noting how the focus on evasion rather than combat sets the game apart and forces players to get creative, but felt it needs more balancing and variety. Shaun Musgrave of TouchArcade assessed the game as "fun to play on a basic level" and overall an "enjoyable affair". He rated it 4/5 points. Famitsu praised the game's "cute" visuals and recommended it to those enjoying roguelikes with quick runs.
