= Million Depth =

2025 video game

- Developer: Cyber Space Biotope
- Publisher: Playism
- Platform: Windows
- Release: November 12, 2025
- Genre: Action
- Mode: Single-player

Million Depth is a roguelike action game developed by Cyber Space Biotope and published by Playism. It was released for Windows on November 12, 2025.

== Gameplay ==
Million Depth is self-described as "deep-diving action strategy game". The player controls Moma, who has access to a crafting system where they can create the character's own weapons and other tools from materials found in outer space. Each creation has different properties depending on how the player combine resources. In battle, time advances only when the player character takes action. The game has 1 million floors to explore. Moma's oxygen meter depletes as the player goes deeper, and has to be recuperated to continue. It has multiple endings depending on the player's progress.

== Development and release ==
Million Depth was developed by Pop, who headed Fairy Tail: Birth of Magic and won the Fairy Tail original game contest.

It was announced in a Playism Game Show live stream on August 8, 2024. The publisher Playism hosted a playable demo in Tokyo Game Show 2024, which ran from September 26 to 29. The game was released for Windows on November 12, 2025.

A "Version 2.0" update in March 2026 provided bug fixes and added a new difficulty mode.

== Reception ==
Jenni Lada from Siliconera gave the game a positive review, praising the use of alternate timelines.
