= Ken Webster (director) =

American actor and director

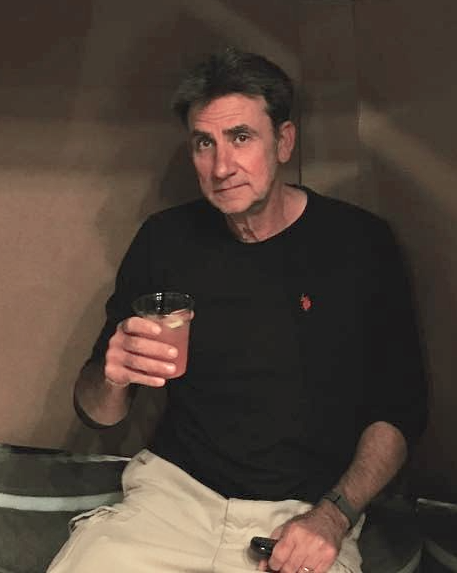
Ken Webster attending an event at the Fusebox Festival in Austin, TX, April 2017.

Ken Webster (born July 29, 1957 in Port Arthur, Texas) is an American director and actor. He is the artistic director of Hyde Park Theatre in Austin, Texas. He has been nominated for 47 B. Iden Payne Awards and 24 Critics' Table Awards for acting, directing, and producing. He has received fourteen B. Iden Payne Awards, including a 2008 award for directing Dog Sees God and a 2007 award for directing The Pillowman, a 2004 award for directing The Drawer Boy and a 2003 award for directing Quake at HPT. He also won the 2012 Critics' Table Award for Outstanding Direction for "The Aliens", 2007 Critics' Table Award for Outstanding Lead Acting for "St. Nicholas" and "Thom Pain (based on nothing)", and a 2003 Austin Critics’ Table award for directing Something Someone Someplace Else and Marion Bridge for HPT, and was awarded the 1999 Critics’ Table John Bustin Award for "conspicuous achievement." He was voted Best Director in the Austin Chronicle Reader's Poll in 2010, 2012, and 2013. His directing credits for HPT include The Pillowman, "Thom Pain (based on nothing)", "My Child, My Child, My Alien Child", You're No One's Nothing Special, Lonely, The Evidence of Silence Broken, Chopper, The Glory of Living, Radio :30, Ham, Blue Surge, Perdita, Blur, and the world premiere of Art Stripped Naked. His acting credits include "Slowgirl", "A Behanding in Spokane", "The Good Thief", "The Drawer Boy", "Blackbird", The Pillowman, The Water Principle, Vigil, and House for HPT. His recent film and television acting credits include "Temple Grandin", Waking Life, A Scanner Darkly, and Friday Night Lights. Webster is the only director in Austin to have received awards for directing in each of the last four decades. He was inducted into the Austin Arts Hall of Fame in June 2006. Webster is married to Austin actress and author Katherine Catmull.

He also did voiceover work in Metroid Prime 3: Corruption.

== Filmography ==
=== Film ===
Year	Title	Role	Notes
1990	Never Leave Nevada	Russian Gambler #2	
1998	Legend of Crystania: The Motion Picture	Ashram (voice)	
1998	Tekken: The Motion Picture	Dr. Bosconovitch (voice)	Direct-to-video
1999	City Hunter: .357 Magnum	Johann Fredrich von Helzen (voice)	
2001	Waking Life	Bartender	
2001	Rurouni Kenshin: The Motion Picture	Saitō Hajime (voice)	
2006	A Scanner Darkly	Medical Officer #2	
2009	Holy Hell	Angry Preacher	
2010	Temple Grandin	Blueprint Draftsman	Television film

=== Television ===
Year	Title	Role	Notes
1998	Legend of Crystania: The Chaos Ring	Ashram (voice)	
1998	Ninja Resurrection	Kanemaru, Tessai Yamanaki (voices)	
1999	Queen Emeraldas	Captain Harlock (voice)	
2000	Rurouni Kenshin: Trust & Betrayal	Saitō Hajime (voice)	
2001	Getter Robo Armageddon	Chinese Ambassador (voice)	
2002	Dai-Guard	Army Commander (voice)	
2003	Mazinkaiser	Professor Yumi (voice)	
2004	Petite Princess Yucie	Douglas (voice)	
2006	Friday Night Lights	Ben Becker	Episode: "It's Different for Girls"

=== Video games ===
Year	Title	Role	Notes
2004	Thief: Deadly Shadows	Orland	
2007	Metroid Prime 3: Corruption		
2011	DC Universe Online	James Gordon, Wildcat	
