= Glaciered =

Upcoming video game

- Developer: Studio Snowblind
- Publisher: Playism
- Director: Kei Shibuya
- Platforms: Windows; Nintendo Switch 2
- Release: 2026
- Genre: Action-adventure
- Mode: Single-player

Glaciered is an upcoming action-adventure video game developed by Japanese indie studio Snowblind and published by Playism. It is scheduled to be released in 2026 for Windows and Nintendo Switch 2. The game is set 65 million years in the future, where life on Earth's surface has gone extinct due to an ice age called the Everwinter. Birds have evolved into the Tuai, a hyper-intelligent underwater race that combines both avian and dinosaur traits. Now dependent on the icy climate for survival, the main character fights against enemies that threaten to end the Everwinter.

== Gameplay ==
The game contains real-time underwater combat in the manner of a character action game, with the player character possessing heat and cold abilities.

== Reception ==
Jordan Devore of Destructoid stated that he had never seen anything like Glaciered, calling it a "a stylish character action game with slick-looking ranged and melee attacks", but set underwater on a frozen-over planet. Saying that he was "hooked on the *idea* of Glaciered", he noted that it "simply looks like something I'd enjoy playing", and that he would be keeping tabs on the game. Rick Lane of PC Gamer had initially believed the game would be similar to Abzû, saying it started out "beautiful, charming and relaxing", but was subsequently surprised by its action elements, which he likened to Bayonetta. Calling the game's premise "delightfully absurd", he praised the fights with giant creatures, saying "it's utterly daft and I am extremely here for it".

Digitally Downloaded remarked that the game had "the potential to break the mould of this genre of Japanese indie action adventures". Jasmine Beverungen of GamePro stated that the game combined aspects of exploration games with fast-paced combat and appealed to her interest in games with a dark, apocalyptic atmosphere, and that she wanted to know more about the setting.
