= Bright Memory =

2019 video game

- Developer: FYQD Personal Studio
- Publisher: Playism
- Composers: Jeff Rona; Cody Matthew Johnson
- Engine: Unreal Engine 4
- Platforms: Microsoft Windows; iOS; Android; Xbox Series X/S; Nintendo Switch; PlayStation 5
- Release: Episode 1; iOS 1 November 2019; Android 12 January 2020; Windows 25 March 2020; Xbox Series X/S 10 November 2020; Infinite; Windows 11 November 2021; Switch, PS5, Xbox Series X/S; 21 July 2022; iOS, Android; 17 January 2025
- Genre: First-person shooter
- Mode: Single-player

Bright Memory (Chinese: 光明记忆) is a first-person shooter game developed by FYQD Personal Studio and published by Playism.

Created by a single developer in his spare time, it was initially released through Steam's Early Access program for Microsoft Windows as Bright Memory: Episode 1 on 12 January 2019, eventually leaving early access on 25 March 2020. Additionally, the game was released for mobile platforms between 2019 and 2020, as well as for the Xbox Series X/S as one of its launch titles on 10 November 2020.

Instead of creating an Episode 2, the game was remade and expanded in both gameplay and story into a full-length title called Bright Memory: Infinite (Chinese: 光明记忆：无限), released on Windows and Xbox Series X/S in 2021. Players who have bought the Windows version of Bright Memory are able to get Bright Memory: Infinite for free.

== Gameplay ==
Bright Memory is a first-person shooter with melee elements. Players take control of Shelia, who, in addition to using guns and a sword, also has supernatural abilities such as psychokinesis and unleashing energy blasts. All forms of attack can be combined as desired and the game will award letter grades to creative combinations similar to Devil May Cry. Success in combat awards experience points that can be used to augment the character's skills and to unlock more abilities such as stopping time. Additionally, some areas feature puzzles that need to be solved. The early access version of the first episode features about an hour of gameplay with the developer announcing another two hours of gameplay by the end of 2019 with more episodes in the following years.

== Synopsis ==
Protagonist Shelia is tasked by the Science Research Organization (SRO) for which she works to prevent SAI, a military organization, from acquiring a legendary ancient power that can reawaken the dead. The game takes place in a "Land of Sky" located above the Arctic consisting of levitating land masses which are home to ancient creatures.

== Development ==
Bright Memory was developed by Chinese developer Zeng "FYQD" Xiancheng using Unreal Engine 4 with development work taking place in the developer's spare time. Zeng first previewed the game in a trailer in 2017 and received financial support through Epic Games's Unreal Dev Grants.

An early access version of "Episode One" was released worldwide on 12 January 2019. The game supports the Oculus Rift virtual reality goggles.

=== Stolen assets controversy ===
In January 2019, Zeng admitted on a post on Sina Weibo that he has used some enemy models without acquiring a license and modified them for use in the game but did not specify which models or which games they were from. In reaction, Zeng announced that he would use the money from the game's sales to hire an art designer and reach out to the original rights holders.

== Reception ==
=== Episode 1 ===
Reception

Aggregate score
Aggregator	Score
Metacritic	XSXS: 55/100

Review score
Publication	Score
Destructoid	7/10

Bright Memory: Episode 1 received "mixed or average" reviews, according to review aggregator Metacritic, for having occasional bugs and almost unintelligible instructions, as it was translated from Chinese. Nevertheless, Rock Paper Shotgun opined that the game has both the look and feel of a shooter game developed with a large budget, and 'wipes the floor' compared to some much higher priced games. The game's music and localization/translations were criticized, as was the short length, with the game not featuring any endless mode.

=== Infinite ===
Reception

Aggregate scores
Aggregator	Score
Metacritic	PC: 67/100; NS: 59/100; PS5: 63/100; XSXS: 70/100
OpenCritic	27%

Review scores
Publication	Score
Destructoid	6/10
Game Informer	7/10
GameSpot	6/10
Nintendo Life	5/10
Nintendo World Report	6.5/10
Push Square	5/10
TouchArcade	3.5/5

Bright Memory: Infinite received "mixed or average" reviews according to review aggregator Metacritic.
