= Kunai (video game) =

2020 action-platform video game

- Developer: TurtleBlaze
- Publisher: The Arcade Crew
- Producer: Bram Stege
- Designers: Benjamin de Jager; Richard Lems
- Programmer: Benjamin de Jager
- Artist: Richard Lems
- Composer: Pongball
- Engine: Unity
- Platforms: Microsoft Windows; Nintendo Switch
- Release: February 6, 2020
- Genres: Action, platform
- Mode: Single-player

Kunai is an action-platform video game developed by TurtleBlaze and published by The Arcade Crew. The game was released on February 6, 2020, for Windows and Nintendo Switch. In the game, the player controls Tabby, a robot tasked with defeating Lemonkus, an AI that nearly causes the extinction of humanity. In July 2020, The Arcade Crew partnered with Limited Run Games to release physical copies of the Nintendo Switch version. The physical copies were released in October 2020. The PC version received generally favorable reviews, while the Nintendo Switch version received mixed reviews.

== Gameplay ==
Tabby uses the katana to destroy two robots.

In Kunai, the player controls Tabby, a robot awakened by a group of resistance robots. Early on in the game, Tabby finds a katana and a pair of kunai. The katana can strike downwards, allowing Tabby to bounce off enemies. It can also be used to deflect bullets. Tabby is healed when they attack an enemy with the sword. A blacksmith will upgrade the katana if Tabby has enough coins. Coins are collected when Tabby destroys enemies or objects with the katana. The kunai are used as grappling hooks, allowing Tabby to traverse the world easier. Tabby's health is restored at save points.

As Tabby progresses, they collect more abilities, such as machine guns, shuriken, and an additional mid-air jump. The machine guns can be used as a way to cross gaps, and the shuriken can stun enemies or activate switches. Tabby receives a hat when they defeat a boss. Secret rooms can be found in the game's world. Chests can be found in these areas. They contain hats, currency, or heart pieces. Upgrades can also be purchased from WiFi routers found in each area.

== Development and release ==
Kunai was developed by TurtleBlaze, a three-man indie studio based in The Hague. Kunai started out as a mobile game. The team was looking for a publisher for their prototype, and bought tickets to the 2018 Game Developers Conference. The team planned multiple meetings with publishers, but decided to not make a mobile game. The team wanted to create a "premium gaming experience". When the Nintendo Switch released in 2017, the team decided to pivot the prototype towards the console. TurtleBlaze received game development kits from Nintendo. In four weeks, the team turned the mobile prototype into a Nintendo Switch prototype. They had to change the game from portrait-based to landscape-based, rework the controls, and learn how to use the development kit. Since Kunai used the Unity engine, porting the game to PC was easier, according to producer Bram Stege. Tabby originated as a robotic monkey, but the team chose to create something more "unique".

In 2018, Kunai was featured at Gamescom and the Tokyo Game Show. The Arcade Crew announced Kunai on March 13, 2019, with a planned launch on PC and Nintendo Switch. The game was included in the Fanatical Platinum Build Your Own Bundle. Kunai was showcased at the 2019 Game Developers Conference and at PAX East 2019. The game was featured at E3 2019 and PAX West 2019. In October, Kunai was given a release window of early 2020. Four minutes of Kunai's gameplay was also released in October. It showed off the game's world and a boss battle with Furious Ferro. The game's demo was available at the 2019 Day of the Devs event. Kunai's release date was announced on January 14, 2020. A boss trailer was released on the same day.

The game was featured again at PAX South 2020. Kunai was released for Microsoft Windows and Nintendo Switch on February 6, 2020. A launch trailer was released on that day to celebrate the game's launch. In July, The Arcade Crew partnered with Limited Run Games to release physical editions of the Nintendo Switch version. The physical editions were released in October 2020, and came with a stickers set and a standard box. A Tabby pin was included as a pre-order gift. In July, Kunai was one of the free Twitch Prime games. In 2022, Kunai was one of 20 games available during Fanatical's Build Your Own Easter Bundle event.

== Reception ==
Reception

Aggregate scores
Aggregator	Score
Metacritic	PC: 78/100 (Note: Score based on 18 reviews.); NS: 73/100 (Note: Score based on 32 reviews.)
OpenCritic	63% recommend

Review scores
Publication	Score
Easy Allies	7.5/10
Famitsu	8/10, 8/10, 8/10, 8/10
Game Informer	6/10
GameSpot	7/10
Hardcore Gamer	3.5/5
Nintendo Life	6/10
Nintendo World Report	9/10
TouchArcade	4.5/5
USgamer	3.5/5
Windows Central	5/5

Kunai's PC version received "generally favorable" reviews, while the Nintendo Switch version received "mixed or average" reviews, according to review aggregator website Metacritic. Fellow review aggregator OpenCritic assessed that the game received strong approval, being recommended by 63% of critics. It received a total score of 32 out of 40 from Famitsu, based on individual reviews of 8, 8, 8, and 8.

Shaun Musgrave from TouchArcade praised the gameplay mechanics, believing that the combat was solid. However, Musgrave felt that the exploration could have been improved, and called the game's backtracking "tiresome". Gamespot's Alessandro Barbosa commended the visual style, combat, and aerial movement. He also described the backtracking as "tiresome". Barbosa called the setting "interesting", but was disappointed by the lack of depth. Joe Juba from Game Informer felt that Kunai had the right components, but did not believe that it was assembled into a "cohesive whole". Daniel Bloodworth from Easy Allies gave Kunai a 7.5/10, writing that the visual style "stands out", and felt that it was "reminiscent" to that of a Game Boy. Bloodworth called the controls "fantastic", but was disappointed by the difficulty of the bosses.

Hardcore Gamer's Jordan Helm felt that the game may "stumble" from a lack of earlier detailing, but called it a "fun, if brief, adventure". Jordan Palmer from Windows Central wrote that Kunai was "polished", and "funny". He praised the design, combat, exploration, and soundtrack. Palmer described the visuals as "unique", but criticized the keyboard controls, writing that they "feel awkward".

Nintendo Life's Ben Sledge called the weapons "interesting", but criticized the amount of backtracking. Sledge did believe that the game fit well on the Nintendo Switch. Nintendo World Report's Neal Ronaghan praised the "Spider-Man-esque" movement, levels, and minimalist presentation. Ronaghan described the boss battles and exploration as "smartly designed". USgamer's Mike Williams wrote that Kunai "stands out" with "exceptionally fluid" combat, and praised the "Game Boy Color aesthetic". He criticized the amount of backtracking in Kunai, and felt that the level design did not offer many branching paths. Williams believed that Kunai had a great foundation for sequel.

=== Nominations ===
Kunai won third place at the 2020 Big Indie Pitch PC/Console Edition.

Year	Award	Category	Result	Ref.
2020	NAVGTR Awards	Outstanding Game, Original Family	Nominated	
2020	Webby Awards	Best User Experience	Honoree	
2021	Dutch Game Awards	Best Art	Nominated	

=== Review bombing ===
In February 2020, Kunai was review bombed on Metacritic, decreasing its user rating from 8.1 to 1.7 in a day. The studio found out that the review bombing was caused by a single user. The user used several email addresses to create around 200 accounts on Metacritic to bring the user rating down. At the time, Metacritic had no policy to identify or handle review bombing. The team reached out to Metacritic, sharing the information they had about the lack of security measures in the user review process.
