= La-Mulana =

2006 video game

- Developers: GR3 Project; Nigoro (remake)
- Publishers: Windows; JP: GR3 Project; WW: Playism (remake); macOS, Linux; WW: Playism; Wii; JP: Asterizm; NA/EU: EnjoyUp Games; PlayStation Vita; JP: Asterizm; NA/EU: Rising Star Games
- Director: Takumi Naramura
- Producer: Shoji Nakamura (remake)
- Designer: Takumi Naramura (remake)
- Programmers: Takayuki "Duplex" Ebihara; Houryū "Samieru" Samejima
- Artist: Takumi Naramura
- Composers: Takumi Naramura; Houryū "Samieru" Samejima
- Platforms: Windows; Wii; PlayStation Vita; Linux; macOS
- Release: Windows: JP: June 27, 2006; WW: July 13, 2012 (remake); Wii: JP: June 21, 2011; NA: September 20, 2012; EU: September 20, 2012; PlayStation Vita: JP: December 17, 2014; NA: March 3, 2015; EU: March 4, 2015; Linux: WW: May 12, 2016; macOS: WW: May 12, 2016
- Genre: Metroidvania
- Mode: Single-player

La-Mulana (stylized as La•Mulana) is a Metroidvania video game, designed to imitate the look and feel of MSX games. Released on June 27, 2006, in Japan for Microsoft Windows, the game was only available in Japanese, but an English translation patch has been produced by Ian Kelley of AGTP. The game was later remade from the ground up in a 16-bit style for the Wii, and later PC, Mac, Linux and PlayStation Vita.

== Gameplay ==
The protagonist of the game is Lemeza, a whip-wielding adventurer exploring the tomb within La-Mulana. Although there is only one ending in the game, there are many ways to get there, in that completing objectives in the game (gaining power-ups and reaching new areas) is not linear, nor is there an obvious recommended path to take. Many power-ups will allow the player to reach new areas, but the game gives no indication of where to go.

Since the game was intended as a tribute to the MSX games of the 1980s (and especially to The Maze of Galious), it uses a 16-color palette and low resolution typical of those games. The opening sequence parodies the typical load screen of the MSX, displaying the amount of available video RAM and a copy of the MSX logo. The protagonist has a laptop MSX in his possession throughout the game, and can collect or buy ROM cartridges for it; many of these can be combined to produce various special effects.

Lemeza in the Mausoleum of the Giants zone

Initially, the protagonist is equipped with a whip, and has a small amount of vitality. Items in the game help advance the plot, some of which do not grant any abilities, but open up a new area or allow another item to be taken. Other items, however, do grant the protagonist abilities, and some are required to access new areas of the game.

Most non-boss enemies in the game will not cause a lot of damage to the protagonist, however there are very few ways to restore life, and in many cases getting hit will cause the protagonist to fall off a hard-to-reach ledge and lose progress. An item in the game is available early on that enables teleportation back to the start (the location of the game's only save point) in addition to various waypoints. As explained in the game's manual, the general strategy of the game is to explore and solve as many puzzles as possible before getting low on life and teleport back when the risk of death becomes too great. However, actions taken in certain rooms can make it very difficult to return after warping out, so warping out is not always the wise action.

One of the principles behind the game's design is difficulty: as described in the game's manual, the developers were disappointed in the lack of difficulty prevalent among many games, and sought to help create a sense of tension in the game—the example they gave was that, if one were a real-life archaeologist, one might think twice before jumping into a dark pit, but in many video games, it is too easy to simply attempt the action, suffer the consequences, and reload. The tension is created by arming many features in the game with various traps that can easily befall reckless adventurers, as well as several complete dead ends, from which, short of teleportation, there is no way out. The game explains these traps as existing in order to protect the sacred ruins.

== Plot ==
Lemeza Kosugi, a professor of archaeology, receives a letter from his father Shorn Kosugi, who claims he has discovered the ruins of La-Mulana, supposedly the birthplace of all civilizations and carries the secret treasure of life itself. Following his father's trail, Lemeza comes to the ruins and discovers it is composed of various amalgamations of various ruins and structures from different areas around the globe. Upon further exploration and discovery within the ruins, Lemeza learns the story about how a being known as "the Mother" fell down from the sky and crashed onto the planet. The Mother has sought to return to space where it came from. To this end, she created various "children" which were different races that roamed the planet that she tasked to find a way to send her back to the sky. None of them could figure out a way to accomplish this task, which angered the Mother greatly and would destroy them in her rage, to start over again with a new race.

The people of the seventh generation of children came to the conclusion that it was impossible to bring the Mother back to the sky; it turns out the entire ruins of La-Mulana is actually the Mother's body. They decided the best course of action before their race was killed off was to grant the Mother a merciful death. To this end, they made it so that the children of the eighth civilization would grow without knowledge of the Mother so they could have the will and power to accomplish such a task. This eight generation would end up becoming humanity. To accomplish this task, Lemeza has to draw out the Mother's soul and bestow it a physical form to destroy. Through a grueling battle, Lemeza manages to accomplish this before Mother can enact her plan to bring forth the ninth generation. Taking the secret treasure of life after defeating the Mother, Lemeza escapes the crumbling ruins to the surface before it collapses on him. Upon his return to the surface, Shorn surprises him from behind and steals the treasure for his own, leading Lemeza to chase after his father into the coming sunrise.

== Development ==
On October 28, 2001, one month after having finished their first game GR3, GR3Project was discussing what game they would make next. The discussion came down to making "something like The Maze of Galious", and so development on La-Mulana started. A build based on a mockup image by director Naramura was made on November 6 of that year, which was kept private until the game's release.

On April 28, 2002, a demo of the game was released, which only featured the first level. With the renewal of GR3Project's website on 2003, development of the game was continuously teased by screenshots on the main page and a subpage of its La-Mulana page. Around the start of 2005, GR3Project announced that they were 70% done with the game.

Later that year on August 17, the game entered an open testing stage with the release of a yet unfinished version of the game. This was mistaken by most websites as an actual release, which was caused by factors such as language barrier and the game already being clearable, though it still lacks many features that would only be seen in the full game; a disclaimer about this was put up on the download page, listing "extra items, keyboard controls configuration, MIDI mode, (and) the opening cutscene" to be added. The complete version of La-Mulana would finally release on June 27, 2006.

== Reception ==
After the release of the English translation patch for the game, the game was played by gaming websites 1UP.com and Joystiq. It was received as a fun game, with 1UP.com calling the game "a great exploratory platformer along the lines of Metroid or Castlevania that completely nails the graphical and musical style of an MSX game". However, both websites noted that the game is extremely difficult.

The PlayStation Vita version of the game sold over 300,000 copies worldwide within the first seven months of release, according to an announcement by Pygmy Studio. By July 2016 that number had surpassed 600,000.

== Legacy ==
=== Remake ===
The game was remade from the ground up, development starting in 2007, and released on Nintendo's WiiWare service by Nigoro on June 21, 2011, in Japan. The WiiWare version features a number of changes, partly to tone down the difficulty and improve design in order to appeal to a larger audience, partly to give players who played the original a new experience, and partly due to copyright issues. In addition, the graphics are updated to a smoother style and the music comes in orchestrated form.

Some other major changes include:

- Bosses have been changed to the point where they are entirely different from the original's bosses.
- The in-game map has some minor changes, including some new rooms and removed rooms.
- Several puzzles have been taken out, while several new ones have been added.
- The engine was rebuilt from scratch, along with new code.
- Renaming the MSX computer system the "Mobile Super X".
- A revision to the melody of "Curse of Iron Pipe" in order to remove similarities to a track from the game Ashguine II.

Plans for releases in North America and Europe were canceled by Nicalis, its original western publisher. In June 2012, EnjoyUp Games expressed interest in publishing La-Mulana. It was released on September 20, 2012, in both North America and Europe without the downloadable content available in Japan, which implementation was supposedly the reason for its initial delay.

A Windows version, based on the WiiWare version, was released on July 13, 2012, on Playism and in October 2012 on GOG.com and Desura. It has also been released on Steam. It features multiple language options (Japanese, English, Spanish and Russian), USB gamepad support (including Xbox 360 controller support), and also includes some tweaks and additions compared to the WiiWare version, including Hell Temple (which needed downloadable content on the WiiWare version), and a revamped Time Attack mode.

A PS Vita version was announced at a Japanese indie game event sponsored by Sony and Playism in September 2013. Developed by Pygmy Studio, this release was titled La-Mulana EX and added a Monster Bestiary alongside some gameplay tweaks. The game launched in Japan on December 17, 2014. Rising Star Games published it in English in North America on March 3, 2015, and Europe on March 4, 2015.

=== Sequel ===
In January 2014, a Kickstarter was launched to raise funds for development of La-Mulana 2. The game was released on July 30, 2018, and focuses on Lemeza's daughter as she searches for her father. The sequel features a greater focus on Norse mythology compared to the first game. The game has been released on Nintendo Switch in Japan on June 27, 2019.

A version containing both the first game and the sequel, La Mulana 1 & 2, was released on PlayStation 4, Nintendo Switch and Xbox One on March 17, 2020, in North America, and on March 20, 2020, in Europe.
