= Playism =

Video game publisher and localizer

- Industry: Video games
- Founded: May 2011
- Headquarters: Osaka, Tokyo
- Key people: Shunji Mizutani (executive producer)
- Parent: Active Gaming Media
- Website: playism.com/en

Playism (stylized as PLAYISM) is a Japanese independent video game publisher operated by Active Gaming Media. Playism started as a digital distribution platform for PC games in May 2011.

== History ==
Playism was launched by Active Gaming Media in May 2011 as a digital distribution platform for PC games. It was founded by Shunji Mizutani, who has run it as executive producer since. Its launch titles included Machinarium and SpaceChem. Its goal was to introduce western-developed indie titles to the Japanese market, and to localize Japanese doujin games for overseas audience.

In April 2013, Playism began a project with HAL College of Technology & Design in both Osaka and Nagoya. The project involves students creating games in four-person teams over a period of several months. The games would then be judged by Playism staff, Daisuke "Pixel" Amaya (Cave Story), Smoking Wolf (One Way Heroics), and members of Nigoro (La-Mulana). The highest-rated games were then localized by Playism, and released on the PLAYISM store page for purchase.

Playism was closely involved in the administration of the indie-based game event BitSummit in March 2013, helping both with translation and interpretation as well as with logistics. In September 2013, Playism collaborated with Sony Computer Entertainment Japan Asia on an event called Indie Stream. Originally planned by indie developers Nigoro and Nyamyam, Indie Stream was designed to bring indie developers from both Japan and abroad together to meet and share information. It was announced at Indie Stream that PLAYISM would be assisting indie developers in publishing their games on PlayStation 4 and PlayStation Vita in Japan.

Playism closed its digital storefront on March 24, 2021, ceasing download service and sales of Steam keys on the website. The company announced that this would not affect its other businesses, and would continue publishing video games for Steam, GOG.com, and other home game consoles.

== Works ==
Year	Title	Developer	Additional note(s)	Ref.
2012	Ether Vapor	Edelweiss	Originally published by Nyu Media; publishing rights transferred to Playism in 2022	
2012	I'm Gonna Be God of the Forest	Shindenken		
2012	La-Mulana	Nigoro	Remake	
2013	Artifact Adventure	Bluffman	Re-release on Steam in 2015	
2013	Unholy Heights	Petit Depotto		
2014	Astebreed	Edelweiss	International release	
2014	Kero Blaster	Studio Pixel		
2014	Magical Battle Festa	Fly System		
2014	Meadowland	Mårten Jonsson		
2014	Mitsurugi Kamui Hikae	Zenith Blue		
2014	One Way Heroics	SmokingWOLF	PC re-release on Steam	
2014	Revolver 360 Re:Actor	Cross Eaglet		
2014	Rime Berta	Next Soft+		
2015	D4: Dark Dreams Don't Die	Access Games	PC version	
2015	Forget Me Not: My Organic Garden	Cavyhouse		
2015	Gocco of War	peakvox		
2015	Hacker's Beat	Team Tands+		
2015	Neo Aquarium: The King of Crustaceans	Nussoft	PC re-release on Steam	
2015	An Octave Higher	Kidalang		
2015	One Way Heroics Plus	SmokingWOLF	Expansion of One Way Heroics	
2015	Prismatic Solid	YO1 KOMORI		
2015	Star Sky	Mårten Jonsson		
2015	Starchaser: Priestess of the Night Sky	Nonlinear		
2015	Torquel	FullPowerSideAttack.com		
2016	Ace of Seafood	Nussoft		
2016	Alicemare	Miwashiba	PC re-release	
2016	Awareness Rooms	Game Na Kibun		
2016	Croixleur Sigma	Souvenir Circ.	PlayStation 4, Nintendo Switch, and PC versions	
2016	Futuridium EP Deluxe	MixedBag	PC version	
2016	A Healer Only Lives Twice	Pon Pon Games		
2016	Helen's Mysterious Castle	Satsu		
2016	Her Story	Sam Barlow	Japanese localization update	
2016	LiEat	Miwashiba	PC re-release on Steam	
2016	Lucy -The Eternity She Wished For-	Modern Visual Arts Laboratory	iOS and Android versions	
2016	Mad Father	sen	PC re-release on Steam	
2016	Memento	Labo Game Studio		
2016	Momodora: Reverie Under the Moonlight	Bombservice		
2016	Murasaki	Katatema		
2016	NightCry	Nude Maker		
2016	Principia: Master of Science	tomeapp		
2016	The Silver Case	Grasshopper Manufacture	Remaster	
2016	Star Sky 2	Mårten Jonsson		
2017	1bitHeart	Miwashiba	PC re-release	
2017	Garden Tale	Bonion Games		
2017	Lost Technology	Studio 4D		
2017	Misao	The Miscreant's Room	Definitive Edition in 2017; 2024 HD Remaster update in 2024	
2017	Rosenkreuzstilette	[erka:es]	PC re-release on Steam	
2017	Rosenkreuzstilette Freudenstachel	[erka:es]	PC re-release on Steam	
2017	VA-11 Hall-A	Sukeban Games	Japanese localization update	
2017	Vertical Strike Endless Challenge	Project ICKX		
2018	Ark Noir	Amamori Lab		
2018	Artifact Adventure Gaiden	Bluffman		
2018	Angels of Death	Hoshikuzu KRNKRN		
2018	The Boogie Man	Uri Games		
2018	Break Arts II	MercuryStudio		
2018	Cineris Somnia	Nayuta Studio		
2018	The Crooked Man	Uri Games		
2018	Hakoniwa Explorer Plus	Suxa		
2018	The Hanged Man	Uri Games		
2018	La-Mulana 2	Nigoro		
2018	Murasaki Tsurugi	Katatema		
2018	The Sand Man	Uri Games		
2018	Star Sky 3	Mårten Jonsson		
2018	Will: A Wonderful World	WMY Studio	Japanese localization update	
2018	Yume Nikki	Kikiyama	PC re-release on Steam	
2018	Yume Nikki: Dream Diary	Kadokawa Corporation		
2019	Artifact Adventure Gaiden DX	Bluffman		
2019	Medusa and Her Lover	ship of EYLN		
2019	Night in the Woods	Infinite Fall, Secret Lab	Japanese localization update	
2019	Pixel Game Maker MV	Kadokawa Corporation		
2019	Steel Sword Story	8bits fanatics	Updated to Steel Sword Story S in 2024	
2019	Strange Telephone	HZ3 Software		
2019	Touhou Luna Nights	Team Ladybug, WSS Playground, Vaka Game Magazine	Early access release in 2018	
2020	Bright Memory	FYQD Studio		
2020	Fight Crab	Calappa Games		
2020	Giraffe and Annika	atelier mimina		
2020	Necrobarista	Route 59		
2020	Omori	Omocat, LLC.	Japanese localization update and the console versions	
2020	Orangeblood	Grayfax Software		
2020	Replica	Somi	Nintendo Switch, PlayStation 4, and Xbox One versions	
2020	Soundart	MercuryStudio		
2020	Umurangi Generation	Origame Digital		
2021	Bright Memory: Infinite	FYQD Studio	Full-length version of Bright Memory	
2021	Deeeer Simulator	Gibier Games		
2021	Doki Doki Literature Club Plus!	Team Salvato	Japanese localization update	
2021	Gnosia	Petit Depotto	International release; Nintendo Switch, PC, Xbox One, Xbox Series X/S, PlayStation 4, and PlayStation 5 versions	
2021	The Good Life	White Owls Inc.		
2021	Idol Manager	Glitch Pitch		
2021	Legal Dungeon	Somi	Nintendo Switch, PlayStation 4, and Xbox One versions	
2021	Mighty Goose	Blastmode		
2021	Record of Lodoss War: Deedlit in Wonder Labyrinth	Team Ladybug, WSS Playground	Early access release in 2020	
2021	The Sealed Ampoule	Cavyhouse		
2021	Tasomachi: Behind the Twilight	Orbital Express		
2022	Drainus	Team Ladybug, WSS Playground		
2022	Ib	kouri	Remake	
2022	Noel the Mortal Fate	Kanawo	Console versions and Microsoft Store release	
2022	Potato Flowers in Full Bloom	Pon Pon Games		
2022	Samurai Bringer	Alphawing Inc.		
2022	Signalis	rose-engine		
2022	Takkoman: Kouzatsu World	illuCalab.		
2022	Temtem	Crema	Physical release in Japan	
2022	Timothy and the Tower of Mu	Kibou Entertainment		
2022	Tokoyo: The Tower of Perpetuity	//commentout	Early access release in 2020	
2023	7 Days to End with You	Lizardry	Nintendo Switch and PC versions	
2023	Drago Noka	GeSEI unkan	PC re-release on Steam and the Switch version	
2023	From Madness with Love	jamsanpoid, Vampire K.K.		
2023	Marfusha	hinyari9	PlayStation 5, PlayStation 4, Xbox One, and Switch versions	
2023	Phantom Rose II Sapphire	makaroll		
2023	Refind Self: The Personality Test Game	Lizardry		
2023	Rusted Moss	faxdoc, happysquared, sunnydaze		
2023	Subway Midnight	Bubby Darkstar	Nintendo Switch version	
2024	The Detective Reaper Invites	Shinzu Kano Umi		
2024	The Exit 8	Kotake Create	Nintendo Switch, PlayStation 4, PlayStation 5, Xbox Series X/S, iOS and Android versions	
2024	Maid Cafe on Electric Street	Adventurer's Tavern		
2024	No Case Should Remain Unsolved	Somi	Nintendo Switch version	
2024	Platform 8	Kotake Create	Nintendo Switch, PlayStation 4, and PlayStation 5 versions	
2024	The Star Named EOS	Silver Lining Studio		
2024	Umurangi Generation VR	Origame Digital	VR version of Umurangi Generation	
2024	Valkyrie of Phantasm	Areazero	Early access release in 2022	
2025	Behind the Frame: The Finest Scenery	Silver Lining Studio	Nintendo Switch version, bundled with The Star Named EOS	
2025	Blade Chimera	Team Ladybug, WSS Playground		
2025	Break Arts III	MercuryStudio		
2025	CATO: Buttered Cat	Team Woll	PlayStation 5 and Switch versions	
2025	Cling to Blindness	Lizardry		
2025	Heart of Crown	Japanime Games		
2025	The Little Tomb: The Maholova Club and the Search for a Dead Body	Cavyhouse		
2025	Metal Bringer	Alphawing		
2025	Million Depth	Cyber Space Biotope		
2025	Mind Diver	Indoor Sunglasses		
2025	Momodora: Moonlit Farewell	Bombservice		
2025	MotionRec	Handsum		
2025	Nidana	lvl374		
2025	Nitro Express	Grayfax Software		
2025	Outrider Mako	Asamado Games		
2025	Snezhinka: Sentinel Girls 2	hinyari9	Nintendo Switch, PlayStation 5, and Xbox Series X/S versions	
2025	Urban Legend Hunters 2: Double	toii	2025 re-launch	
2025	The Use of Life	Daraneko Games	Early access release in 2022	
2026	The Dream of a Cockspur	roccay		
2026	Dyping Escape	Heaviside Creations		
2026	Homura Hime	Crimson Dusk		
2027	DevilConnection	ChaoGames	Nintendo Switch, iOS, and Android versions	

=== Upcoming release and others ===
Title	Developer	Additional note(s)	Ref.
Bot!	Aimed Freedom	Student project for the PlayStation 4 in 2015; unreleased	
Gensokyo Night Festival	WSS playground, tea_basira	Early access in 2019	
MaguSphere: Magical Cannon Girls	Ohbado	Missed release window in 2022	
Fight Crab 2	Calappa Games	Early access in 2024	
Journey Record	Kochi Create	Missed release window in 2024	
EDEN.schemata();	WSS Playground, illuCalab.	Release window in spring 2025	
Glaciered	Studio Snowblind	Release window in 2026	
Care Make Arena	Lizardry	Early access in 2026	
The Dream of a Cockspur	roccay	Release window in 2026	
Dungeon Sweeper Plus	Setamo	Release window in 2026	
Haruka: Beyond the Stars	atelier mimina	Release window in 2026	
A Passing in the Night	.iris	Release window in 2026	
Samurai Bringer: Rampage	Alphawing	Release window in 2026	
Skateboard Knight	Playism	Release window in 2026	
There's Something Wrong with the Hero's Choices	minatonezumi	Release window in 2026	
Full Belly Breakout	Zxima	Release window in 2027	
Idol Manager: Virtual Venture	Glitch Pitch	Release window in 2027	
Iron Bramble	Emlise, Mini Bunnies	Release window in 2027	
Midnight Train: New Moon	LydiaBluebell	Release window in 2027	
Sea Sniffers	Blastmode, MP2 Games	Release window in 2027	
34EVERLAST	Kanata Lab, Hyper Real	Release date TBD	
