= Momodora: Reverie Under the Moonlight =

2016 video game

- Official logo
- Developer: Bombservice
- Publishers: Playism, Dangen Entertainment
- Director: rdein
- Programmer: PKBT
- Artist: Hernan Zhou
- Series: Momodora
- Engine: GameMaker Studio
- Platforms: Microsoft Windows; Linux; macOS; PlayStation 4; Xbox One; Nintendo Switch
- Release: March 4, 2016: Microsoft Windows; March 4, 2016; PlayStation 4; March 16, 2017; Xbox One; March 17, 2017; macOS; February 16, 2018; Linux; February 16, 2018; Nintendo Switch; January 10, 2019
- Genre: Metroidvania
- Mode: Single-player

Momodora: Reverie Under the Moonlight is an indie Metroidvania video game developed by rdein and published by Playism. The game was originally released on March 4, 2016, for Microsoft Windows. It is the fourth installment of the Momodora series that began in 2010 with Momodora I.

== Gameplay ==
Momodora: Reverie Under the Moonlight is a side-scroller platformer. The player controls Kaho, a priestess on a quest to stop a curse that has been corrupting the land. Kaho explores a variety of areas collecting items, avoiding obstacles, and fighting monsters. In every area, Kaho must also fight a boss. In combat, Kaho can perform both melee attacks with a leaf and ranged attacks with a bow. Kaho can also find and equip items and spells to assist her in combat.

== Plot ==
Momodora: Reverie Under the Moonlight is a prequel set 400 years before the events of Momodora I. The story follows a Priestess named Kaho, who travels to the eastern Kingdom of Karst to stop a curse that has been spreading across the land and affecting her village. In Karst City, Kaho meets Cath, a Knightess who informs Kaho that the queen of Karst is the source of the curse, and the only way to stop the curse is to kill the queen. Kaho travels around collecting the four pieces of a crest required to open Karst Castle and face the queen. Inside Karst Castle, Kaho is briefly reunited with a dying Cath who failed to stop the queen. Kaho confronts the queen and manages to defeat her. Kaho then sacrifices herself, drawing the curse into her body in order to seal it and save the land.

== Development ==
Like others in the Momodora series, Reverie Under the Moonlight was created by rdein, a Brazilian developer, whose personal studio is Bombservice. He published the game through Playism. The game was developed in GameMaker: Studio. rdein funds the development of the games through the crowdfunding platform Patreon.

PlayStation 4 and Xbox One ports of the game were released on March 16, 2017, and March 17, 2017, respectively. A Nintendo Switch version was released on January 10, 2019, by Dangen Entertainment.

== Reception ==
Reception

Aggregate score
Aggregator	Score
Metacritic	PC: 82/100; PS4: 76/100; XONE: 77/100; NS: 71/100

Review scores
Publication	Score
Computer Games Magazine	7/10
Destructoid	8/10
GameSpot	6/10
Hardcore Gamer	4/5
Nintendo World Report	6.5/10
Push Square	7/10
RPGamer	3.5/5

Momodora: Reverie Under the Moonlight received an 82/100 aggregate review score on Metacritic, indicating "generally favorable reviews". Chris Shive from Hardcore Gamer gave the game a 4 out of 5 score saying, "Momodora: Reverie Under the Moonlight is the ideal mix of old and new. The visuals and 2D platforming scream '80s NES, but the detail that went into the pixel art and the attack combos mixed with fluid animation give this title just enough of a modern feel so it doesn't feel dated." Destructoid's Nick Valdez rated the game 8 out of 10, praising its "tight, intense combat," but commented that the game's soundtrack was "unmemorable, and not functional at all times."
