= List of Record of Lodoss War characters =

The following is a list of characters from the Record of Lodoss War media franchise.

== Main characters ==
=== Original series ===
==== Parn ====
A young swordsman living in the Kingdom of Alania, Parn is the son of Tessius, an infamous knight of Valis, and an unnamed Alanian noblewoman who appears in a flashback in the Grey Witch manga. At the beginning of the series, Parn is a brave but unskilled fighter who lives in a small farming community and feels ostracized by the townsfolk for his father's legacy. He later leaves the village after a goblin attack, eventually meeting with King Fahn of Valis and King Kashue of Flaim. His skills eventually improve to the point where he can put up a decent fight against his nemesis, the Dark Knight of Marmo, Ashram. During his adventures, he meets Deedlit the high elf, and they become romantically involved over the course of the series.

Parn is voiced by Takeshi Kusao in the OVA and cameo appearances, by Nobutoshi Canna in Chronicles of the Heroic Knight, and by Bill Timoney in English.

==== Deedlit ====
A female high elf skilled in both swordplay and elemental sorcery, Deedlit grew up in the Forest of No Return, her people's isolated abode. From an early age, however, she became interested in the outside world and, despite the disapproval of her family and peers, set out to learn more about it. After meeting Parn, she develops a romantic interest in him for his rash, impulsive nature, sense of honor, and dedication, and faithfully accompanies him in the war against Marmo.

Deedlit is voiced by Yumi Touma in the OVA and cameo appearances, by Shiho Niiyama (eps. 1-21) and Junko Noda (eps. 22-27) in Chronicles of the Heroic Knight, and by Lisa Ortiz in English.

==== Etoh ====
Parn's best friend and a priest of Falis, the Supreme God. Upon King Fahn's death, he later becomes the king of Valis and the husband of Princess Fianna.

Etoh is voiced by Kappei Yamaguchi in the OVA, Shinichiro Ohta in Chronicles of the Heroic Knight, and Ted Lewis in English.

==== Slayn ====
An old friend of Ghim's, Slayn is a wise and powerful magician. He marries the priestess Leylia after she is freed from Karla's possession and becomes the father of Little Neese.

Slayn is voiced by Hideyuki Tanaka in the OVA, by Mitsuru Miyamoto in Chronicles of the Heroic Knight, and by Al Muscari in English.

==== Ghim ====
Ghim is an elderly but skilled dwarven warrior. Prior to the start of the series, Ghim was wounded in a mining accident and was healed at the Temple of Marfa by Neese and her daughter Leylia. When Leylia was kidnapped and possessed by Karla, the Grey Witch, Ghim left to search for her. He has a past connection with Slayn, and comes to seek his aid in locating Leylia. Ghim arrives shortly before the goblin attack in Parn's village, prompting him and Slayn to join Parn and Etoh on their quest. Later in the OVA, Ghim challenges Karla to free Leylia's body from possession; though successful, Ghim is killed by Karla's magic, with his axe marking his gravesite in the closing scenes of the OVA. Ghim does not appear in the TV series, but is mentioned.

Ghim is voiced by Yoshisada Sakaguchi in Japanese and Greg Wolfe in English.

==== Woodchuck ====
A thief and the last member of the party to join, Woodchuck encounters the group when they are thrown into prison. After Leylia is rescued from Karla's possession, Karla takes over Woodchuck, after which his whereabouts are unknown. In the novels, rather than being captured, he willingly takes Karla's circlet in an attempt to make up for the over twenty years of his life that he spent in prison.

Woodchuck is voiced by Norio Wakamoto in Japanese and Jacques LeCann in English.

=== Chronicles of the Heroic Knight ===
==== Spark ====
A young aspiring warrior from Flaim who dreams of becoming a knight. He is initially unaware that King Kashue considers him to be his possible successor in ruling Flaim and is therefore reluctant to send him into danger, an intention which is foiled by Spark's impulsiveness and hot-headedness. Over the course of his trials, however, Spark becomes more mature and responsible from his experiences, and enters a romantic relationship with Little Neese. He worships Parn as his idol, who in turn becomes fond of Spark, as he reminds him of his own impetuous youth.

Spark is voiced by Kenji Nojima in Japanese and Crispin Freeman in English.

==== Little Neese ====
The 13-year-old daughter of Leylia and Slayn, who is possessed by the soul of Naneel. Like her grandmother, who she is named after, and her mother, she is a priestess of Marfa. Aware of Naneel's presence inside her, she has detached herself emotionally from the rest of the world, although her mental barriers begin to come down when she meets Spark and gradually falls in love with him. She is later freed from Naneel's presence when Wagnard attempts to resurrect Kardis by drawing Naneel's essence from her.

Little Neese is voiced by Chie Sawaguchi in Japanese and Roxanne Beck in English.

==== Leaf ====
A young half-elf born to a male elf and a female human warrior in the realm of Alania. She first met Deedlit during the first war against Marmo, when her home village was evacuated, and has idolized her ever since. She later becomes a mercenary and Garrack's partner. She is a skilled fighter with her spear and, like a full-blooded elf, capable of using spirit magic.

Leaf is voiced by Maaya Sakamoto in Japanese and Debora Rabbai in English.

==== Garrack ====
An overconfident axe-wielding mercenary who joins Spark's company under Kashue's orders, secretly being a Noble of Flaim ordered by Kashue to protect Spark. Despite his boisterous attitude, he is brave and loyal to a fault. He eventually enters a relationship with the thief Ryna.

Garrack is voiced by Masaya Takatsuka in Japanese and by Michael Gerard and Crispin Freeman in English.

==== Ryna ====
A human thief who joins Spark and his companions mainly to seek revenge against a group of dark elves she had encountered, who had stolen a holy artefact from the vault of Valis and cursed her fellow thief and friend Randy, which eventually led to his death. Although she initially keeps her true profession a secret, the others, especially Garrack, gradually work out her identity as a thief. After using her skills to aid them, she becomes a trusted and valued member of the team and becomes romantically attracted to Garrack.

Ryna is voiced by Chizu Yonemoto in Japanese and A.J. Parks in English.

==== Aldonova ====
A huge but somewhat timid wizard who becomes part of Spark's company. He is Slayn's pupil and very devoted to Little Neese, often to the point of losing his sight on more important matters.

Aldonova is voiced by Tamotsu Nishiwaki in Japanese and Steve Patterson in English.

==== Greevus ====
A dwarven priest of Myrii, who also joined Spark under Kashue's request. He is a skilled healer, as well as a doughty fighter with his halberd.

Greevus is voiced by Kazuhiko Kishino in Japanese and Greg Wolfe in English.

== Other characters ==
=== Ashram ===
Known as the "Black Knight," Ashram is a highly skilled warrior and the former retainer and right-hand aide of Emperor Beld, serving him during the War of Heroes and sent on the front to deal with any possible resistance. After the death of Beld at the hands of Karla the Grey Witch in the OVA (or Kashue in the TV series), Ashram took up his blade, the Demon Sword Soul Crusher, and returned to Marmo to regroup. Later on, Ashram seeks to dominate Lodoss rather than conquer it, as he searches for one of the governor's treasures, the Scepter of Domination. After the destruction of the scepter, Ashram is believed to have died in the fires of Fire Dragon Mountain, but it is later revealed that one of the agents of Wagnard sacrificed his powers, which were stripped by Wagnard, in order to save his life.

Ashram is voiced by Akira Kamiya in the original OVA and Legend of Crystania, and by Shō Hayami in the TV series. In the English version, he is voiced by John Knox in both series, and by Ken Webster in Crystania.

=== Beld ===
Emperor Beld was a former member of the "Six Heroes," a band of adventurers who fought and defeated the Demon King 30 years before the events of Record of Lodoss War. During the battle with the demon god, Beld's soul was destroyed when his blade became baptized in the blood of the demon; in the aftermath, his sword became the legendary blade Soul Crusher. He later became the lord of Marmo Island and led an army of humans, dark creatures, and dark elves in an invasion of Lodoss. The invasion was largely successful, but after killing his old friend Fahn in personal combat, he was betrayed and struck down by Karla the Grey Witch; the rule of Marmo subsequently passed to his general, Ashram.

Beld is voiced by Taro Ishida in Japanese and by Bob Barry in English.

=== Fahn ===
Along with his former friend and companion Beld, King Fahn was one of the Six Heroes and a Holy Knight of Valis, later becoming the King of Valis. He is the one force that truly holds Beld in check and prevents him from acting. Fahn holds the opposing blade to Soul Crusher, the Holy Sword of Falis, with the two blades increasing in power when in each other's presence. Parn's father was a former knight of his. Fahn is struck down by Beld just before Beld himself is killed.

Fahn is voiced in English by J. W. Gunther in the TV series.

=== Karla ===
Karla the Grey Witch, so named because of her obsessive neutrality, is the enigmatic sole survivor of the ancient kingdom Kastuul, also known as the Kingdom of Sorcery. As barbarian tribes laid siege to the city, Karla, a member of the nobility at the time, foresaw the destruction and sealed her consciousness into a circlet she wore on her forehead. Though her original body was killed in the battle, her consciousness and power lives on in the hosts that she possesses so long as they wear the circlet. Due to the horrible fate that Kastuul suffered, Karla swore never to allow such destruction to occur again. Karla has maintained a secret, shadowy influence on the major events of Lodoss for more than 500 years, though her long life and incredible power has warped her perception of herself. Her sworn duty "for the good of Lodoss" is to endlessly shift the balance of power between the various nations of Lodoss, preventing the annihilation of any one power, at the cost of preventing its rise. She has manipulated the major wars in Lodoss since the fall of Kastuul and even participated in some, though, by nature of her neutrality, she is not always an antagonist. She was one of the "Six Heroes" - a group of adventurers who fought and defeated the Demon God King 30 years prior to the events of the series.

Throughout the anime series, she is shown possessing three bodies: Leylia, priestess of Marfa and daughter of Neese; Woodchuck, whom she used to escape at the battle where Karla's circlet was forcefully removed from Leylia, subsequently freeing her; and an unnamed woman who resembles her original body. After Karla helped Wagnard resurrect Naneel, avatar of Kardis the Destroyer, Leylia takes Karla's circlet, believing that she can control the witch so long as she is consciously aware of Karla's presence within the circlet. This brings an end to 500 years of conflict in Lodoss caused by her machinations.

=== Leylia ===
Leylia is the daughter of Neese, a priestess of Marfa. She is possessed by Karla when her mother is busy tending to a battered Ghim, after which Ghim sets out to rescue her from Karla's control. Leylia later marries Slayn and becomes the mother of Little Neese.

=== Shiris ===
A red-headed and somewhat hot-tempered mercenary woman. She meets Parn and his companions while on protective watch over a village, along with her partner Orson. She develops a crush on Parn, much to Deedlit's disconcertion, but they remain good friends.

In the TV series, after losing Orson, Shiris makes off on her own.

=== Orson ===
A strong and silent mercenary and the partner of Shiris. He maintains an impassive front, mainly because he is a berserker. In the TV series it is revealed that a dark spirit called Hyuri took over him as a child when he watched his younger sister being attacked by bandits. In order to prevent himself from hurting those he loves, he has shut himself off from the rest of the world.

Orson is secretly in love with his partner Shiris; his berserker state is triggered when he sees her in mortal danger, and she is the only one able to bring him out of it. However, because of his condition, he cannot bring himself to admit his feelings to her. In the TV series, he dies protecting Shiris from Ashram, causing her to discover her true feelings for him.

=== Princess Fianna ===
The daughter of Fahn. As a child, King Fahn surrendered her to one of the tribes of the desert, which would later become Flaim, to the north, so that she could be sacrificed to Shooting Star to appease the dragon. Parn's father, Tessius, made a secret plan with King Fahn to rescue Fianna, in which he would take the blame for destroying diplomatic relations with the tribe. This led to his dishonor, and he was sent to the front lines of the civil war that began as a result, where he died.

Fianna's presence is initially diplomatic, sent to give a message to Alania. However, she is intercepted by Karla, who informs her that Alania has fallen. She is saved by Parn and his companions, and later on grants Parn the blade of her father.

Upon first encountering the group, Fianna becomes attracted to Etoh. While it is never explicitly indicated in either the manga or the anime series, it is likely that they were married when Etoh assumed the throne of Valis. Fianna was not considered an heir to the throne, however, as the royalty of Valis is chosen not by royal bloodline; upon the death of the previous king, a successor is chosen from the knighthood. Etoh's succession to the throne after marrying Fianna was due to his high spiritual power as a Falis priest and the high regard that the church held him in, though there was opposition in not only a non-knight ascending the throne, but Fianna gaining political power as queen.

Fianna is voiced by Rei Sakuma in Japanese and by Simone Grant in English.

=== King Kashue ===
Also known as the Mercenary King, Kashue is famous for being the only man capable of uniting the desert country of Flaim, which he accomplished using only his sword. During the War of Heroes, Kashue was instrumental in staving off the invasion of Lodoss by the Marmo forces, assuming leadership following the death of King Fahn, after the latter killed Beld in the final battle by cutting him down when he was distracted by a crossbow bolt shot by Karla the Grey Witch. The story surrounding these events was changed in the OVA, instead having Karla perform the killing blow herself. Because of this, Ashram holds Kashue responsible for treachery, and seeks to slay him for his supposed sins. Parn greatly admires him.

In the Japanese version, Kashue was voiced by Shuichi Ikeda in the OAV and by Joji Nakata in the TV series. In the English version, Kashue was played by Chris Yates in the OAV and by Anthony Cruise in the TV series.

=== Naneel ===
Naneel is a priestess of Kardis, as well as her avatar embodied. She begins to directly manipulate the people of Lodoss for over 50 years before she is slain by King Kadomos I. Naneel's death was one that was not complete, as she was reincarnated in the form of Leylia some time later. Neese, knowing the child's dark secret, adopted her and raised her as her own, trying to shield her from the truth of her dark secret. When Leylia became pregnant, the soul of Naneel was transferred into the body of her baby, "little Neese".

=== Pirotess ===
Pirotess is a dark elven noble considered to be one of the more prominent figures in her people's society. Like most dark elves, she worships Fararis and calls the Forest of Darkness on Marmo island her home. She is the younger sister of Astar, a member of the quest of Scepter of Domination, eventually cheated by the chief leader of all dark elves, the powerful Luzev, who had decided to recreate the kingdom of his kindred. Believing that Ashram should pay for her brother's death, she joined the mission of killing the general of Dark Knighthood. Ashram found and bested her in hand-to-hand combat when she ambushed him in his bedroom, but let her go after learning her identity as the sister of his lost old friend. After she learned the truth and Luzev's decision from her fellow assassin, she stalked Ashram to learn about him and discovered his loyalty to the lost emperor, the heroic Beld, and his dedication to Marmo and its people. She decided to protect him from the other assassin and aided him in a "Test" from the Dark Sage. After 10 years, she was the only one to whom Ashram had showed appreciation and care, and in turn she remained fiercely loyal to Ashram as a lieutenant and a leader of his scouts. She was accepted by the subordinates of Ashram as their mistress and sub-general. Pirotess is a skilled adversary, both an adept of the rapier and a skilled magic user. A shaman like Deedlit, she often uses spirits that high elves will not associate with, such as the spirits of darkness.

She is a lover of Ashram, going with him when Ashram decides to leave Lodoss for good and seek a new land where they can find peace. When they reach Crystania, Pirotess is forced to seek out a solution after Ashram is placed into stasis by one of the god beasts of Crystania.

In the original OVA, she sacrifices herself to save Ashram from the powerful dragon Shooting Star.

In the Japanese version, Pirotess is voiced by Sakiko Tamagawa in the OVA and Legend of Crystania (as Sheru) and by Kumiko Nishihara in the TV series. In the English version, Pirotess is voiced by Meg Frances in both series, and by Edi Patterson in Crystania.

=== Flaibe ===
Flaibe is a dwarf and the king of the Stone Kingdom. When the Demon Wars began, Flaibe's kingdom is the first to fall. He is rescued by Karla and is the only survivor of his kingdom. He forms a group with Beld, Fahn, Neese, Wort, Karla and Flaus, the group that would later be known as the Six Heroes with the exception of Flaus. Flaibe led his comrades into the ruins of Stone Kingdom, where they fought and killed the archdemon who stole his throne. After the Demon King was slain in the Deepest Labyrinth, Flaibe was hailed as one of the Six Heroes.

Flaibe hoped to rebuild his nation. Following Marmo's purification, he decided it would be the location of the new Stone Kingdom.

=== Wagnard ===
Wagnard is a dark wizard and a worshipper of Kardis, the goddess of destruction. He was originally a student of the magical academy in Valis alongside Slayn, but was expelled for studying the dark arts of magic and cursed with a spell which restricted his ability to cast magic by causing him great pain when he does so. With time, however, Wagnard became mostly accustomed to the pain and attained great power as a magician.

Despite following Beld, Wagnard seeks to kill all the inhabitants of Forcelia and rule over them as their undead king, a lich. In the OVA, he attempts this by abducting the high elf Deedlit, as high elves have near immortal life spans and such energy is necessary to revive Kardis. In the original story, manga, and TV series, Wagnard abducts the priestess of Marfa and daughter of Leylia, Little Neese, the doorway to Naneel and avatar of Kardis. When Naneel is successfully summoned, Wagnard's plans are thwarted and he is killed. Wagnard's summoning of Kardis never takes place in the manga, but the summoning of Naneel does.

In the Japanese version, Wagnard is voiced by Takeshi Aono in the OAV and by Chikao Otsuka in the TV series. In the English version, Wagnard is voiced by Jayce Reeves in the OAV, who also voiced him in episode 18 of the TV series, and by Pete Zarustica in the TV series.

== Dragons ==
=== Abram ===
A blue dragon and an ally of Narse, one of the five ancient dragons that had one of the governor's treasures. Abram resides on Blue Dragon Island, where he swims from to attack and destroy sailing vessels. Abram protects the Soul Crystal Ball, an artifact that can restore life.

=== Bramd ===
Bramd is an ancient white dragon and a former ally to the magic city of Kastuul, now a loyal and direct ally of Mycen. When Kastuul fell during the final battle of the magic city, Bramd and several other dragons were sent to distant corners of Lodoss to try and preserve the legacy of the magic city. Bramd was given the Mirror of Truth to protect, and did so until he was absolved of the geas spell upon himself.

A decade or more before the events of Record of Lodoss War, Bramd's geas spell was lifted by Neese, a priestess of Marfa. After Neese removed the curse from Bramd, Bramd granted her the staff he was entrusted to protect. In order to keep the staff protected, Neese sent it away to the city of Valis to remain within the halls of the temple of Falis.

In his search for the Scepter of Domination, Ashram slew Bramd while he was still in hibernation. However, finding no treasure with the dragon, he went to Tarbin, the location of the high temple of Marfa, where he learned that Bramd's artifact was not what he was looking for.

=== Mycen ===
A golden dragon and one of the five ancient dragons that had one of the governor's treasures. She resides in Moss, guarded by a fortress of dragon riders. Mycen's treasure is the Staff of Life, which could heal any wound and resurrect the dead.

=== Narse ===
A black dragon and one of the five ancient dragons that had one of the governor's treasures, being the dragon counterpart of Kardis. Narse resides underneath Marmo, where he sleeps while awaiting the proper day to awaken. Narse protects the Ferronierre of Knowledge, which remains unclaimed and unfound.

=== Shooting Star ===
A red dragon and one of the five ancient dragons that had one of the governor's treasures. The most powerful of the dragons, Shooting Star protects the most powerful artifact, the Scepter of Domination. Shooting Star resides in Flame Dragon Mountain, close to the city of Blade.

== Gods of Lodoss ==
The seven gods listed below each form the basis for a major religion of Lodoss. There are other gods who are worshipped, such as Ganeed, the god of thieves, but they are considered minor gods. Some gods are named after racehorses, such as Pharis, Marfa, Mairie, and Phalaris.

=== Phalis ===
Phalis, also spelled as Falis in the anime, is the supreme god of goodness and light, and his affiliated colours are blue, white, and gold. He is associated with healing, good, and protection, and is lawful good in alignment. Phalis and Pharalis were two of the major gods who fought in the cataclysmic war, with their final battle resulting in the destruction of many gods and other fighters. Etoh is a priest of Phalis.

=== Marfa ===
Marfa is the goddess of creation and preservation, and her affiliated colours are green and silver. She is associated with healing, creation, and good descriptors, and is chaotic good in alignment. Marfa and Kardis were the final two gods left alive at the end of the cataclysmic war, with their battle ending in a stalemate as they tried to strike each other down with one final blow, but both fell into a death sleep after Alecrast and Lodoss split apart. Kardis fell on the island of Marmo, while Marfa fell on Lodoss. Marfa's spirit is the strongest in Alania, and her main temple is the village of Tarba in Alania's White Mountains.

=== Mairie (or Myrii) ===
Mairie, also translated as Myrii, is the god of war and justice, and his affiliated colors are red and grey. He is associated with war, protection, and knowledge, and is true neutral in alignment. Mairie's role in the cataclysmic war is never specified. In Rune Soldier, Melissa is a priestess of Mairie.

=== Rahda ===
Rahda is the god of knowledge, and his affiliated colors are black, white, and grey. He is associated with knowledge and law, and is lawful neutral in alignment. Rahda's role in the cataclysmic war is not specified.

=== Cha Za ===
Cha Za is the god of good fortune and luck, and his affiliated color is green. He is associated with luck and chaos, and his alignment is chaotic neutral. His role in the cataclysmic war is not specified.

=== Pharalis ===
Pharalis, also translated as Falaris, is the god of freedom, desire, and darkness, and his affiliated colors are black and crimson. He is associated with desire, death, darkness and freedom, and is chaotic in alignment. Pharalis and Phalis were two of the major gods who fought in the cataclysmic war, with their final battle resulting in the destruction of many gods and other fighters. He is not truly evil, but his acceptance of all desire causes most of his mortal followers to become enshrouded in evil.

=== Kardis ===
Kardis, also spelled as Cardice, is the goddess of destruction and misery, and her affiliated colors are black and red. She is associated with evil, death, and destruction, and is chaotic evil in alignment. Kardis and Marfa were the final two gods remaining alive at the end of the cataclysmic war, with their battle ending in a stalemate as they tried to strike each other down with one final blow, but fell into a death sleep after Alecrast and Lodoss split apart. Marfa's body fell upon the island of Lodoss, while Kardis fell upon the small island of Marmo. The island of Marmo bore the brunt of her curse, leaving it corrupted and shrouded in darkness.
