= Misao Jo =

Japanese textile artist, weaver, and educator

- 城 みさを
- Born: April 27, 1913; Sakai, Osaka Prefecture, Japan
- Died: January 10, 2018 (aged 104)
- Occupations: textile artist, weaver, educator
- Known for: Saori weaving founder

Misao Jo (城 みさを, Jō Misao; April 27, 1913 – January 10, 2018) was a Japanese textile artist, weaver, and educator. She was born in Sakai, Osaka Prefecture. She is famous for establishing the modern Japanese style of weaving known as Saori, as well as a philosophical framework for weaving which included Zen philosophy.
