= Active Gaming Media =

Localization company

Active Gaming Media Inc.
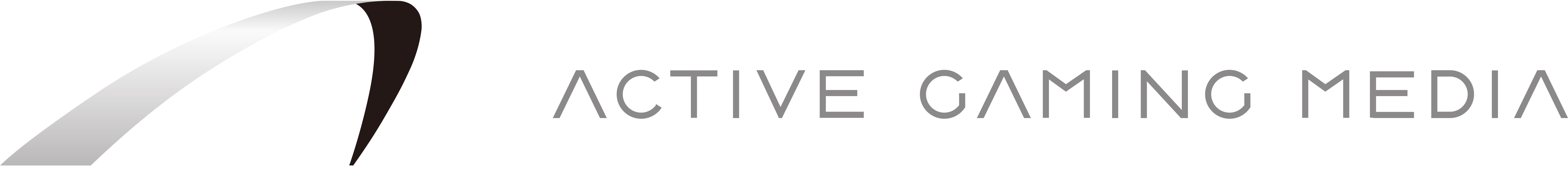
- Native name: 株式会社アクティブゲーミングメディア
- Industry: Language localization, Software testing, Entertainment, Video Games, Media/Public Relations
- Founded: April 2008; 18 years ago
- Founder: Ibai Ameztoy
- Headquarters: Osaka, Japan
- Website: Active Gaming Media Website

Active Gaming Media Inc. (AGM) is a localization company based in Osaka, Japan. Founded in 2008 by CEO Ibai Ameztoy, the company's main focus lies in providing localization services for video games. AGM has since branched out to provide services such as game debugging, marketing, promotion, voice acting, and publishing for games and anime.

Having worked on a number of titles for various platforms including PlayStation 3, PS Vita, PC, as well as online and mobile games, AGM has collaborated with a number of major Japanese video game companies, including Sony Corporation, Grasshopper Manufacture and Capcom. Notable titles are Demon's Souls, No More Heroes, Monster Hunter, the survival-horror series Resident Evil, and the Devil May Cry series.

In May 2011, AGM launched the Japan-based version of the Playism website, an indie game distribution platform. With the aim of introducing Western indie games to Japan, Playism started off by distributing localized versions of Machinarium and SpaceChem. Aside from being a distribution platform, Playism offers indie game funding, localization, and publishing services for indie game developers. Along with the English release of Nigoro's archaeological platformer La-Mulana, Playism launched the English version of the Playism store in July 2012. In addition to both paid and free indie games, Playism also offers a pay what you want model for some of its titles. The platform adapts a concept similar to Steam.

== History ==
- 2008
  - Established as a legal entity in Tokyo
- 2009
  - Headquarters moved to Osaka.
- 2011
  - Acquired Tokyo Great Visual (Osaka branch), headquarters relocated within Osaka
  - Launched digital distribution platform Playism in Japan
- 2012
  - Active Gaming Media's CEO Ibai Ameztoy was included on Gamasutra's 2012 "Power 50" list of influential people in the video game industry.
- 2016
  - Launched the YumeHaven brand, which focuses on the localization of Japanese visual novels.
- 2021
  - Launched English gaming media website AUTOMATON WEST.

== Completed projects ==
Over the past five years, AGM has translated more than 300 game titles for six different platforms into nine languages.

Game title	Platform	Source Language	Target Language
1112 episode 3	iOS	French	English, Italian, German, Spanish
2020: My Country	Facebook	English	Japanese, Korean, Chinese
Age of Champions	Facebook	Japanese	English, German, Spanish, French
Alan Wake	Xbox 360	Korean, Taiwanese	Korean, Taiwanese
CityVille	Facebook	English	Japanese
CastleVille	Facebook	English	Japanese
Deadfall Adventures	Xbox 360	English	Japanese
Dear Esther	PC	English	Japanese
Demon's Souls	PlayStation 3	Japanese	English
Eufloria	PC/ PlayStation 3/ PS Vita	English	Japanese
Gran Turismo PSP	PlayStation Portable	Japanese	English
Great Edo of Nippon	PlayStation 3	Japanese	French, Spanish, Italian, German
Half-Minute Hero	Wii	Japanese	French, Spanish, Italian, German, English
Harvest Moon: Tree of Tranquility	Wii	English	French, Spanish, Italian, German
Hidden Chronicles	Facebook	English	Japanese
Joe Danger	PlayStation 3	English	Japanese
Kingdom Conquest	iOS	Japanese	English, French, German, Spanish, Chinese, Korean
Kingdom Conquest 2	iOS	Japanese	English, French, German, Spanish, Portuguese, Chinese, Korean
King of Fighters XIII	Xbox 360/ PlayStation 3	Japanese	English, French, Spanish, Italian, German, Korean, Chinese
Deca Sports Extreme	3DS	Japanese	English, French, Spanish, Italian, German
La-Mulana	PC	Japanese	English
LittleBigPlanet	PlayStation 3	Japanese	Chinese
Little King's Story	Wii	Japanese	English, French, Spanish, Italian, German
Mitsurugi Kamui Hikae	PC/ PlayStation 4/ Xbox One	Japanese	English
My Country	Facebook	English	Japanese, Korean, Chinese
Mystery Manor	Yahoo! Mobage	English	Japanese
New Little King's Story	PS Vita	Japanese	English, French, Spanish, Italian, German
No More Heroes: Heroes' Paradise	Xbox 360 / PlayStation 3	Japanese	English, French, Spanish, Italian, German
Painkiller	Xbox 360	English	Japanese
Rune Factory 2: A Fantasy Harvest Moon	NDS	English	German
Shufflepuck Cantina	iOS	French	English, Italian, German, Spanish
Soulcalibur IV	PlayStation 3	Japanese	English
SpaceChem	PC	English	Japanese
Superhero City	Facebook	Japanese	English, German, Spanish, French
Tartaros	Online Game	Korean	Japanese
Test Drive Unlimited 2	PlayStation 3	English	Japanese
The Denpa Men: They Came By Wave	3DS eShop	Japanese	English, French, German
The Last Guy	PlayStation 3	Japanese	English
The Legacy of Transylvania	Yahoo! Mobage	English	Japanese
The Tribez	iOS	English	Japanese
Trash Panic	PlayStation 3	Japanese	English
Trouble Witches	Xbox 360	Japanese	English
Valhalla Knights	Wii	English	French, Spanish, Italian, German
Wangan Midnight: Maximum Tune 4	Arcade	Japanese	English, Chinese
World of Zoo	Wii	English	French, Spanish, Italian, German
