= Touhou Luna Nights =

2018 video game

- Key art, featuring Sakuya
- Developer: Team Ladybug
- Publisher: Playism (Note: Nintendo Switch version was published by Phoenixx until July 2023)
- Series: Touhou Project
- Platforms: Windows; Xbox One; Nintendo Switch; PlayStation 4; PlayStation 5
- Release: Windows; February 26, 2019; Xbox One; September 3, 2020; Nintendo Switch; December 17, 2020; PS4, PS5; January 25, 2024
- Genres: Action, Metroidvania
- Mode: Single-player

Touhou Luna Nights (/ˈtoʊ.hoʊ/, TOH-hoh) is a Metroidvania action video game developed by Team Ladybug and published by Playism. It is based on the Touhou Project series and is licensed by the series' developer Team Shanghai Alice. Touhou Luna Nights follows Sakuya Izayoi, the head maid of the Scarlet Devil Mansion in the realm of Gensokyo, as she is sent to a parallel universe and ventures to escape to her homeland.

The game tasks the player with exploring a large mansion, with them being able to manipulate the passage of time at will to aid in combat against enemies. The player's offensive and defensive abilities can be permanently upgraded using an in-game currency, while collectibles obtained from enemies provide passive gameplay perks if they remain stored in the inventory.

First available through Steam Early Access on August 20, 2018, the game was fully released on February 26, 2019, and later ported to the Xbox One and Nintendo Switch in 2020. PlayStation 4 and PlayStation 5 ports were released on January 25, 2024. Touhou Luna Nights received positive reviews from critics, who praised its movement mechanics, art direction, difficulty, and faithfulness to the source material, but critiqued its short length. As of June 11, 2024, the game has sold over 500,000 copies.

== Gameplay ==
Sakuya attacks enemies using knives. "Grazing" occurs when enemies make near-contact with Sakuya, rewarding her with extra mana and health (jointly represented by blue symbols).

Touhou Luna Nights is a two-dimensional (2D) side-scrolling Metroidvania video game with action elements. Its characters and setting are derived from the Touhou Project series of bullet hell shooter video games. The game tasks the player with navigating through a large mansion, maneuvering through puzzle gauntlets, defeating hostile enemies, and fighting bosses. The player controls the maid Sakuya Izayoi, whose ultimate goal is to escape her imprisonment in the mansion, situated in a parallel reality, at the hands of her master Remilia Scarlet. She is intercepted by members of Touhou's main cast, who serve as the bosses. The mansion houses five primary explorable regions, as well as an optional sixth; each region concludes with a mandatory boss encounter. Sakuya's core abilities, hailing from her native Touhou appearances, consist of manipulating time and throwing knives, the latter being her default offensive attack. Sakuya later gains access to secondary armaments, including chainsaws, shields, and weapons that stun her foes.

Time manipulation is initially restricted to decelerating time passage for a limited duration, referred to as Snail Time. The player unlocks the ability to freeze worldly movement altogether, known as Time Stop. During Time Stop, which can be manually toggled at any point, Sakuya can traverse atop non-solid terrain such as water. Sakuya encounters enemies and obstacles highlighted in certain colors, signifying that their movement behavior alters during Time Stop. Such colors are green, meaning the object is usually stationary but will begin moving in Time Stop; yellow, meaning the object will reverse course; and purple, meaning the object moves as normal both during regular gameplay and Time Stop. Time Stop is governed by a self-replenishing meter that if fully reduced renders the ability temporarily unusable.

Discharging knives drains the mana point (MP) meter, which refills at a slow rate. A health point (HP) meter, which drops upon being attacked by enemies, does not regenerate; losing all health results in death. Sakuya's HP can be refilled by using one of several vending machines scattered throughout the mansion. MP and HP can together be accumulated by having enemy attacks make near-contact with Sakuya. This occurrence is known as "grazing", which originates from official Touhou games. HP cannot be obtained through grazing if the move is performed while time is frozen. The Time Stop meter's contents can also be artificially increased through grazing, but deplete at a faster rate if Sakuya continuously moves during Time Stop.

Sakuya obtains gems by defeating enemies. While stored in the inventory, gems passively improve the strength of existing abilities such as throwing knives; gems are categorized by their specific effects. They can be exchanged for gold at the shopkeeper Nitori Kawashiro, but doing so retracts the gems' associated perks. The player can spend gold to permanently upgrade Sakuya's capabilities, acquire new secondary weapons, and increase her maximum MP and HP. Novel skills such as double jumping and mid-air gliding can be learned by finding them strewn across the mansion. Also dispersed throughout the map are save points and magical doorways that, when unlocked using keys obtained from bosses, instantaneously transport the player to a region of their choosing.

== Synopsis ==
=== Setting ===
The Touhou Project series takes place in the realm of Gensokyo, which houses numerous occult creatures that regularly cause supernatural "incidents". One of the series' main protagonists is Reimu Hakurei, a shrine maiden whose responsibility it is to resolve incidents. In Gensokyo lies the Scarlet Devil Mansion. It is the residence of Remilia Scarlet, a vampire who serves as the mistress to the mansion's head maid Sakuya Izayoi. Other Touhou cast members that make appearances as both non-player characters and bosses are the martial artist Hong Meiling, the witch Marisa Kirisame, the magic librarian Patchouli Knowledge, and the kappa Nitori Kawashiro.

=== Plot ===
Sakuya Izayoi is unwillingly transported to a parallel universe named Luna Nights that resembles the Scarlet Devil Mansion by Remilia Scarlet. Sakuya loses her abilities in the process. After exploring the entirety of Luna Nights and recovering her powers, Sakuya confronts Remilia, who alleges that displacing Sakuya from Gensokyo was done for her own amusement. Remilia's younger sister Flandre Scarlet, who previously disguised herself as Nitori Kawashiro, arrives and hijacks the universe to exact revenge for Remilia using her magical gems to create Luna Nights without permission. After Sakuya defeats Flandre, Remilia apologizes and undoes Luna Nights.

In the game's alternate ending, the real Nitori discovers that the parallel universe is collapsing and sends Sakuya to investigate. Sakuya finds that Reimu Hakurei had infiltrated Luna Nights, as its contents are beginning to affect the real Gensokyo. After Sakuya and Reimu conclude fighting, Remilia, Nitori, and Flandre arrive, disclosing to everyone that the true purpose of Luna Nights was to create a realm where Flandre could freely use her powers to avoid creating an incident in Gensokyo. However, they were unsuccessful in containing Flandre's magic, gaining Reimu's ire. The spiritual energy built up during the fight causes the universe to disintegrate, with Sakuya barely escaping in Nitori's mech.

== Development and release ==
Touhou Luna Nights was developed by indie studio Team Ladybug. It was launched through Steam Early Access on August 20, 2018. The studio's producer Daichi Saito stated in an interview that Team Ladybug chose to develop a game based on the Touhou Project both out of respect for the series as a "senior indie game developer" and for its wide audience base. Saito partially attributed the game's later commercial success to the popularity of the Touhou intellectual property (IP), saying, "The great thing about IPs is that they can be played by these thousands of people. If it's a high-quality game with substance, word of mouth from those who play it will spread its reputation." An early access release model was implemented to streamline communication between developers and players, as well as to provide a platform for user feedback. Grazing, particularly its ability to artificially replenish weapons' MP, served as a "risk-reward system" to elevate the tension of combat.

=== Release ===
On February 20, 2019, Playism held a fan art contest; the winning artwork, which was required to depict Sakuya, would be chosen as the game's banner on Steam. The contest concluded with illustrator Yutaro's artwork as the victor. Touhou Luna Nights saw its full release on Steam on February 26, 2019. Touhou Luna Nights' commercial release was personally approved by series creator Jun'ya "ZUN" Ōta, one of the first such cases for a Touhou fan work. The game is in turn licensed by the official Touhou studio Team Shanghai Alice.

In June 2019, the game was updated, featuring Reimu as the game's new final boss, a dash ability, a new weapon, a boss rush mode, and achievements. The game was released on Microsoft Store for the Xbox One and Windows 10 on September 3, 2020; this version features an additional boss battle against Touhou character Cirno. In December 2020, Team Ladybug announced that the Cirno boss fight would be included in the original Steam version. This update was released on January 18, 2021. Touhou Luna Nights was made available on Xbox Game Pass for a limited time, starting from September 3, 2020. It was removed on February 28, 2022.

A Nintendo Switch port was announced in October 2020. This version was originally published by Phoenixx, who also assisted with porting, on December 17, 2020. On July 1, 2023, Nintendo Switch publishing duties were transferred back to Playism to streamline customer support. Ports for the PlayStation 4 and PlayStation 5 were released on January 25, 2024 alongside physical editions. In commemoration of Touhou Luna Nights' five-year anniversary, a physical, limited-time collector's edition was made available for the Nintendo Switch and PlayStation 5 on July 11, 2025.

==== Potential sequel ====
On April 1, 2024, Team Ladybug posted a pixel illustration of Sakuya to their X account with the caption, "We're making Touhou Luna Nights 2." This announcement was met with positive reactions from fans online, though skepticism arose on whether the reveal was an April Fools' Day joke. On May 20, 2025, Team Ladybug posted "Luna Nights 2" to their X account.

== Reception ==
=== Critical response ===
Reception

Review scores
Publication	Score
Famitsu	(NS) 8/10, 8/10, 7/10, 8/10
Jeuxvideo.com	(PC) 16/20
IGN Japan	(NS) 10/10
3DJuegos	(PC) Good

Reviewers commended the game's movement mechanics, many citing Sakuya's time manipulation as a standout feature. Kurt Kalata of Hardcore Gaming 101 wrote that the interplay between time manipulation and Sakuya's knife-based combat felt engaging. James Archer of Rock Paper Shotgun thought that the hostility of enemies—hordes often surrounding the player—offset the strength of time manipulation. Echoing this sentiment, Automaton's Masahiro Yonehara called Time Stop "by no means invincible", praising its limited duration as providing a unique sense of challenge. Famitsu reviewers jointly lauded time manipulation as fun and satisfying to use, one reviewer praising its implementation during puzzle sections. Yonehara applauding the game's puzzles for exploiting a wide variety of gameplay mechanics. Jeuxvideo.com wrote that the graze ability felt rewarding to master, while Famitsu reviewers called grazing an "exquisite" maneuver that added a layer of complexity to traditional video game combat.

Touhou Luna Nights' frenetic combat and difficulty were praised. Archer commended Touhou Luna Nights' emphasis on fast-paced, aggressive fighting as both engaging and exhilarating. Pastor, writing for 3DJuegos, favorably viewed the game's intense enemy encounters, but felt combat could become unreasonably chaotic. The boss' attack patterns, which are modeled after the bullet hell format of official Touhou games, were praised as being aesthetically faithful and taking advantage of Sakuya's weapon arsenal and movement capabilities. Jeuxvideo.com called the game's overall difficulty well-balanced. Yonehara shared this view, complimenting Touhou Luna Nights as a game that can be appreciated by both beginners and seasoned veterans to Metroidvanias. Reviewing the Switch port, IGN Japan's Fuminobu Hata praised Touhou Luna Nights for melding features from both the Touhou Project and traditional Metroidvanias, allowing for a reinvention of established Metroidvania elements. He suggested that the game be used as a template for future titles in the genre.

Critics acclaimed the game's artistic presentation. They responded positively to its pixel art visuals, overall described as aesthetically pleasing and distinctive. The player and enemy animations in particular were lauded as fluid, expressive, and detailed. (Note: Attributed to multiple sources:) Further praise was offered to the soundtrack, which largely consists of remixed music from the mainline Touhou game Embodiment of Scarlet Devil (2002). The songs were deemed well-orchestrated and memorable. (Note: Attributed to multiple sources:)

Its story was seen as simple, yet overall satisfactory. Reviewers felt that extensive knowledge of the Touhou universe was not necessary to enjoy the story. (Note: Attributed to multiple sources:) Kalata agreed, but wrote that the game largely neglects to formally introduce its main characters, assuming players have a broad familiarity with the source material. Tarason deemed Touhou Luna Nights' plot frivolous—summarizing it as "a vague excuse for a lot of explosions"—but ultimately reflective of the official series' tone. Pastor disapproved of the story's simplicity, labeling it as an "inconsequential" narrative that, due to the game's short length, concluded unceremoniously.

Touhou Luna Nights' brevity was a point of criticism. Tarason felt the title's brief playtime was its sole shortcoming, wishing that more content had been present. Gouhuo.qq felt the game lacked sufficient replay value in that there was little incentive to revisit the castle past the first playthrough. Eurogamer Spain's Pablo Casado likewise critiqued the map's linearity as contributing to a trite and unrewarding backtracking system. He criticized Touhou Luna Nights' roughly five-hour length as one of several flaws that prevented its unique gameplay structure from achieving its peak potential, a sentiment shared by Pastor. Jeuxvideo.com saw its duration as disappointing and opined that players may be left wanting; he additionally critiqued the shopping mechanic for being overly rudimentary.

=== Sales ===
On February 28, 2019, 50,000 copies of the game were sold. According to Team Ladybug, sales reached 100,000 copies after the game's final update was launched in June 2019. Japanese website 4Gamer.net reported that the game had reached 150,000 copies worldwide by August 2020. In April 2021, Team Ladybug announced that the game reached 250,000 copies sold across all platforms. Automaton reported on June 11, 2024 that the game surpassed 500,000 copies sold.
