= Misao (video game) =

2011 video game

- Developer: Sen
- Publishers: Miscreant's Room; Playism (HD Remaster)
- Engine: Wolf RPG Editor
- Platform: Microsoft Windows
- Release: May 26, 2011 (Freeware); Definitive Edition: WW: October 25, 2017 (Steam); HD Remaster: WW: August 15, 2024 (Steam)
- Genre: Adventure
- Mode: Single-player

Misao (Japanese: 操) is a survival horror and puzzle game developed by Sen and Miscreant's Room as freeware and was originally released on May 26, 2011. The objective of the game is to find the 6 parts of a girl's body in a cursed school. The definitive edition of the game was released on Steam on October 25, 2017. An HD remaster of the game was released on Steam on August 15, 2024. A related game set in the same universe, Mad Father, was released in 2012.

== Gameplay ==
Misao is an adventure game with horror and puzzle elements. The player controls a student trapped in their school, which has transformed into an otherworldly place full of danger. The player makes progress by investigating the available areas in the school.

When the player makes a wrong decision in certain events, the game prematurely ends with a bad ending. The game features over 40 endings of such, and keeps track of the player's progress with them as collectibles.

== Plot ==
Three months ago, Aki's classmate, Misao, disappeared. She was very calm and reclusive, often the target of bullying. One day during school, Aki starts to hear Misao's voice in the middle of class, scaring her classmates: Aki's best friend Ayaka, mature and reserved student Kudoh, the school jock Tohma, Tohma's girlfriend Saotome, leader of the bullies Yoshino, and popular teacher Sohta. Then, the school starts shaking and Aki loses consciousness. When she awakens, she finds out from student council president "Onigawara", who is actually Ogre from Mad Father, that the school has been dragged into another dimension by Misao's spirit, and that demons are terrorizing and killing the students. Onigawara enlists Aki in solving Misao's death by finding her scattered body parts throughout the school to perform a ritual and confronting her classmates.

Aki first opens a locker in her classroom with Sohta stuffed inside, and Sohta goes off to find the rest of the students. Aki finds Ayaka sneaking through Sohta's belongings in the faculty office and warns her about the demons, to no avail as Ayaka has a large crush on him and wants to unlock his desk. Later, she finds Saotome getting attacked by a demon in the bathroom with Tohma watching helplessly before running away. Aki manages to kill the demon, but it was too late as Saotome was killed before she could be saved. She finds Kudoh outside on a street, confessing his love for Misao and apologizing for not being there for her. Misao's spirit appears and condemns Kudoh before having a car run him over. Returning to the school, Aki finds Yoshino tied to a table in the science classroom, transformed into a futuristic laboratory. A hostile presence approaches, forcing her to hide in the corpse of a man while Yoshino is chainsawed to death by Alfred Drevis, who was resurrected as a zombie-like entity with no remaining sanity. In the library, Aki encounters "Library", the student council vice president, later renamed Novella. She also finds Tohma hiding in a makeshift bedroom. She finally finds Kudoh again, in the middle of a street in a demon town, still trying to apologize to Misao before getting run over by a car, killing him.

While finding the body parts throughout the school, Aki experiences flashbacks from Misao, which reveal that Kudoh used to be best friends with Misao, before getting ridiculed by his friends for hanging out with a girl in junior high, and that Misao dated Tohma briefly. However, they broke up when Saotome and Yoshino leaked their private texts in an attempt to humiliate Misao in front of the whole school, and to get Tohma to date Saotome instead. In a further attempt at humiliation, Yoshino also arranged for a male student to rape Misao in the school bathroom.

During these events, Ayaka gets attacked in the faculty office by a demon and Sohta takes her to the nurse's office, where Aki questions him about Misao. He reveals that he was helping her with the bullying and giving her counseling before she went missing. Ayaka is in a distressed state, begging Aki to not leave her there, but Sohta assures Aki that he will protect her. Ayaka is later killed in a surprise attack by a demon in the nurse's office, with Sohta barely surviving. Sohta then gives Aki the last remaining body parts, the arms, stating that he found them while wandering the school. Outside the school, graves with the names of the dead students appear and start glowing when they die. Aki tries to perform the ritual, but it fails. She confronts Onigawara, and he says that one more person connected to Misao has to die in order for the ritual to succeed.

Aki is given a choice to kill either Tohma or Sohta. If Aki kills Tohma, it leads to a bad ending where it is revealed in a flashback that Misao had gone to Sohta for help after she had been raped, only for Sohta to then rape Misao himself before dismembering her for her hands, as he has a psychotic addiction to them. Additionally, he had also killed Ayaka, who managed to open his desk only to find Misao's hands inside, leading him to enter and drag her to the nurse's office, and faking the demon attack. After the school is brought back, Sohta quickly kills Aki to hide the truth and returns to his life. If the player kills Sohta instead, it leads to the true ending; it is still revealed that Sohta killed Misao and Ayaka, but it is also revealed that Tohma didn't know about the text messages being leaked by Saotome and Yoshino and that he was innocent throughout everything. The school is then restored, and everyone who died was forgotten and replaced with generic students, and Aki and Tohma go back to their daily lives, with Onigawara and Novella revealed to not actually be in the student council, replacing the real ones from the real world.

In an epilogue mode after finding all of the bad ends, Aki is spirited away by Onigawara on her way home from school with Tohma, and Onigawara enlists her to save Kudoh, Saotome, and Yoshino from eternal suffering by rescuing their souls from personal hells created by Misao. Kudoh's hell is getting relentlessly beaten by Misao on a middle school playground, Saotome's hell is Misao making out with Tohma while she can only watch helplessly, and Yoshino's hell is getting bullied in a bathroom by a group of Misao clones. Aki can also visit Sohta's grave as well and help him absolve his sin. After that, Aki is transferred to limbo where Misao and Tohma making out until the latter runs away in fear after seeing Misao's zombified form. Aki confronts Misao for what she has done to her tormentors, leading her to feeling remorse and finally making peace with Aki before disappearing. After saving them, Onigawara reveals that the victims (except Sohta) were reborn as babies to live a new life with him and Novella in a copy of the school remaining in the demon world along with Tohma as punishment for his cowardice. Aki returns to the real world and awakes in empty classroom, where she sees a message in chalkboard that says "Thank you" possibly from Misao. Aki then goes home, finally knowing that everything is over and hoping to see Misao again someday. During the ending credits, Onigawara resurrects Ayaka to help take care of the infants.

In the Definitive Edition version of the game, certain graphic and sensitive content alterations were made, such as Aki needing to find Misao's personal items rather than her body parts, Kudoh's death being on a stage instead of a street and being crushed by a stage light instead of getting hit by a car, as well as Aki hiding inside the carcass of a bear instead of a man during the science classroom scene. Other changes were also made, such as Sohta being renamed as Kurata. The player can also alternatively choose to play as Akito, a male version of Aki, with a different personality and different dialogue.

== Development and release ==
Misao was developed by Hitodenashi no Kuukan. The game was developed in Wolf RPG Editor. The game was released on 26 May 2011 as freeware. It received a worldwide release as a commercial version, titled Misao: Definitive Edition, on October 2017.

Misao 2024 HD Remaster, an update to Definition Edition, was announced on 8 August 2024. It was published by Playism. It remastered the graphics with HD assets, and added a new function that marks objects and areas already investigated by the player. The update was released on 15 August, replacing Definition Edition.

== Reception ==
RPGFan rated the game 70 out of 100, finding it basic but a hard game to dislike. The Definition Edition released on Steam received "overwhelmingly favorable" user reviews, with 95% out of 1786 reviews recommending the game as of August 2024.
