= List of video games released in 2022 =

The following is a comprehensive index of all games released in 2022, sorted chronologically by release date, and divided by quarter. Information regarding developer, publisher, operating system, genre and type of release is provided where available

For a summary of 2022 in video games as a whole, see 2022 in video games.

== Legend ==
Video game platforms
3DS	Nintendo 3DS, 3DS Virtual Console, iQue 3DS	Arcade	Arcade video game	ATRVCS	Atari VCS
DROID	Android	iOS	iOS, iPhone, iPod, iPadOS, iPad, visionOS, Apple Vision Pro	LIN	Linux, SteamOS
NS	Nintendo Switch	OSX	macOS	PS4	PlayStation 4
PS5	PlayStation 5	Quest	Meta Quest / Oculus Quest family, including Oculus Rift	Stadia	Google Stadia
WIN	Windows, all versions Windows 95 and up	XBO	Xbox One	XBX/S	Xbox Series X/S

Types of releases
Compilation	A compilation, anthology or collection of several titles, usually (but not always) belonging to the same series
Early access	A game launched in early access is unfinished and thus might contain bugs and glitches or have some of the content missing
Episodic	An episodic video game that is released in batches over a period of time
Expansion	A large-scale DLC to an already existing game that adds new story, areas and additions and/or changes to the game's mechanics
Full release	A full release of a game that launched in early access first
Limited	A special release (often called "Limited" or "Collector's Edition") with bonus collector's material. Often provided to people who pre-order a game
Port	The game first appeared on a different platform and a port was made. The game is like the original, with few or no differences
Remake	The game is an enhanced remake of an original, made using a new engine and/or assets and thus containing completely new sound, graphics and possibly changes to the story and/or gameplay
Remaster	The game is a remaster of an original, released on the same or different platform, with (usually minor) changes to graphics, sound and/or gameplay
Rerelease	The game was re-released on the same platform with no or only minor changes

Video game genres
4X	4X game	Action	Action game	Action RPG	Action role-playing game
Action-adventure	Action-adventure game	Adventure	Adventure game	Battle royale	Battle royale game
Brawler	Beat 'em up	Bullet hell	Bullet hell	Business sim	Business simulation game
City builder	City-building game	CMS	Construction and management simulation	DCCG	Digital collectible card game
Deck building	Deck building game	Digital tabletop	Digital tabletop game	Dungeon crawl	Dungeon crawl
Fighting	Fighting game	FPS	First-person shooter	Government sim	Government simulation game
Graphic adventure	Graphic adventure	Hack and slash	Hack and slash	Hero shooter	Hero shooter
Horror	Horror game	Life sim	Life simulation game	Metroidvania	Metroidvania
MMO	Massively multiplayer online game	Music	Music video game	Narrative adventure	Narrative adventure game
Party	Party video game	PCA	Point-and-click adventure	Platformer	Platformer
Puzzle	Puzzle video game	Puzzle-platformer	Puzzle-platformer	Racing	Racing video game
Rhythm	Rhythm game	Roguelike	Roguelike, Roguelite	RPG	Role-playing video game
RTS	Real-time strategy	RTT	Real-time tactics	Run and gun	Run and gun game
Sandbox	Sandbox game	Scrolling shooter	Scrolling shooter	Shoot 'em up	Shoot 'em up
Simulation	Simulation video game	Social sim	Social simulation game	Sports	Sports video game
Stealth	Stealth game	Strategy	Strategy video game	Survival	Survival game
Survival horror	Survival horror	Tactical RPG	Tactical role-playing game	TBS	Turn-based strategy
TBT	Turn-based tactics	Tower defense	Tower defense	TPS	Third-person shooter
Vehicle sim	Vehicle simulation game	Vehicular combat	Vehicular combat game	Visual novel	Visual novel

== List ==
=== January-March ===
Release date	Title	Platform	Type	Genre	Developer	Publisher	Ref.
January 3	Freddi Fish 3: The Case of the Stolen Conch Shell	NS		Adventure	Humongous Entertainment	UFO Interactive Games	
January 3	Putt-Putt Travels Through Time	NS		Adventure	Humongous Entertainment	UFO Interactive Games	
January 4	Deep Rock Galactic	PS4, PS5		FPS	Ghost Ship Games	Coffee Stain Publishing	
January 4	The Pedestrian	XBO, XBX/S		Puzzle, Platformer	Skookum Arts LLC		
January 6	Demon Gaze Extra	NS, PS4		RPG	Cattle Call	Clouded Leopard Entertainment	
January 6	QuickSpot	NS		Puzzle	Bandai Namco Online	Bandai Namco Entertainment	
January 10	Japanese Rail Sim: Journey to Kyoto	NS		Vehicle sim (train)	Sonic Powered		
January 10	Picross S7 (NA)	NS		Puzzle	Jupiter		
January 12	Monster Hunter Rise	WIN		Action RPG	Capcom		
January 12	SNK vs. Capcom: Card Fighters' Clash	NS		DCCG	SNK		
January 13	Astroneer	NS		Sandbox, Adventure	System Era Softworks		
January 13	Boomerang Fu	PS4, PS5		Fighting, Party	Cranky Watermelon		
January 13	Deemo II	iOS, DROID		Rhythm	Rayark		
January 13	Eschatos	NS		Scrolling shooter	Qute Corporation		
January 13	Mary Skelter 2	WIN		RPG, Dungeon crawl	Compile Heart	Ghostlight	
January 13	Nova-111	NS		Adventure	Funktronic Labs	No Gravity Games	
January 13	Shadow Man Remastered	PS4, XBO		Action-adventure	Nightdive Studios, Acclaim Entertainment	Nightdive Studios	
January 13	Spelunky 2	XBO, XBX/S		Platformer, Roguelike	Mossmouth, BlitWorks	Mossmouth	
January 14	God of War	WIN	Port	Action-adventure	Jetpack Interactive, Santa Monica Studio	PlayStation PC	
January 17	Shadow Man Remastered	NS		Action-adventure	Nightdive Studios, Acclaim Entertainment	Nightdive Studios	
January 18	Nobody Saves the World	WIN, XBO, XBX/S		Action RPG	Drinkbox Studios		
January 18	River City Girls	PS5		Brawler	WayForward	Arc System Works	
January 19	Hatsune Miku Logic Paint S	WIN, XBO, XBX/S		Puzzle	Crypton Future Media		
January 19	Yu-Gi-Oh! Master Duel	WIN, NS, PS4, PS5, XBO, XBX/S		DCCG, Strategy	Konami		
January 20	Aquamarine	WIN, OSX, LIN		Adventure	Moebial Studios	Hitcents	
January 20	Banjo-Kazooie	NS		Platformer			
January 20	Dimension Tripper Neptune: TOP NEP	WIN		Action, Roguelike, Platformer	Frontier Works	Idea Factory	
January 20	Disney Twisted-Wonderland (NA)	iOS, DROID		Adventure, Rhythm	f4samurai	Aniplex	
January 20	Expeditions: Rome	WIN		Tactical RPG	Logic Artists	THQ Nordic	
January 20	Hitman Trilogy	WIN, PS4, PS5, XBO, XBX/S		Stealth	IO Interactive		
January 20	Pupperazzi	WIN, OSX, XBO, XBX/S		Photography	Sundae Mouth	Kitfox Games	
January 20	RPGolf Legends	WIN, NS, PS4, PS5, XBO		Action RPG, Sports	ArticNet	Kemco	
January 20	Tom Clancy's Rainbow Six Extraction	WIN, PS4, PS5, XBO, XBX/S, Stadia		Tactical shooter	Ubisoft Montreal	Ubisoft	
January 20	Windjammers 2	WIN, NS, PS4, XBO, Stadia		Sports	Dotemu		
January 21	MouseCraft	XBO		Puzzle	Crunching Koalas		
January 21	Needy Streamer Overload	WIN, OSX		Adventure, Visual novel	Xemono, WSS Playground	WSS Playground	
January 21	Strange Horticulture	WIN		Puzzle	Bad Viking	Iceberg Interactive	
January 21	Technoroid Unison Heart (JP)	iOS, DROID		Puzzle, Adventure	WonderPlanet	CyberAgent	
January 22	Reverie Knights Tactics	WIN, OSX, LIN, PS4, XBO		Tactical RPG	40 Giants Entertainment	1C Entertainment	
January 23	Gnosia	WIN		Visual novel, RPG, Social deduction	Petit Depotto	Playism	
January 24	Archetype Arcadia (JP)	WIN		Visual novel	Water Phoenix	Kemco	
January 25	The Artful Escape	NS, PS4, PS5		Platformer	Beethoven & Dinosaur	Annapurna Interactive	
January 25	Cannibal Cuisine	PS4, PS5, XBO, XBX/S		Simulation	Rocket Vulture		
January 25	Fast & Furious: Spy Racers Rise of SH1FT3R	Stadia		Racing	3DClouds	Outright Games	
January 25	Not For Broadcast	WIN		Government sim	NotGames	tinyBuild	
January 25	Serious Sam: Siberian Mayhem	WIN		FPS	Croteam, Timelock Studio	Devolver Digital	
January 25	Trollhunters: Defenders of Arcadia	Stadia		Action	Casual Brothers	Outright Games	
January 26	Elasto Mania Remastered	WIN, NS, PS4, PS5, XBO, XBX/S		Simulation	Elasto Mania Team		
January 27	Bravely Default: Brilliant Lights (JP)	iOS, DROID		RPG	Square Enix		
January 27	Cadavers for Dinner (JP)	NS, PS4		Survival, Tactical RPG	Nippon Ichi Software		
January 27	Circuit Superstars	PS4		Racing	Original Fire Games	Square Enix Collective	
January 27	Gunvolt Chronicles: Luminous Avenger iX 2	WIN, NS, PS4, PS5, XBO, XBX/S		Action, Platformer	Inti Creates		
January 27	Hatsune Miku Connecting Puzzle Tamagotori (JP)	NS		Puzzle	Crypton Future Media		
January 27	The Longest Road on Earth	NS, PS4, PS5, XBO, XBX/S		Adventure, Casual	Brainwash Gang, TLR Games	Raw Fury	
January 27	Monster Menu: The Scavenger's Cookbook (JP)	NS, PS4		Tactical RPG	Nippon Ichi Software		
January 27	Rugby 22	WIN, NS, PS4, PS5, XBO, XBX/S		Sports	Eko Software	Nacon	
January 27	Taiko no Tatsujin: The Drum Master!	WIN, XBO, XBX/S		Rhythm	Bandai Namco Studios	Bandai Namco Entertainment	
January 27	Yu-Gi-Oh! Master Duel	iOS, DROID		DCCG, Strategy	Konami		
January 28	Pokémon Legends: Arceus	NS		Action RPG, Monster tamer	Game Freak	The Pokémon Company, Nintendo	
January 28	Record of Lodoss War: Deedlit in Wonder Labyrinth	NS		Action RPG, Metroidvania	Team Ladybug, WSS Playground	Playism, WSS Playground	
January 28	Uncharted: Legacy of Thieves Collection	PS5		Action-adventure	Naughty Dog	PlayStation PC	
January 31	Bloodborne PSX	WIN		Action	LWMedia		
February 1	Hextech Mayhem	iOS, DROID		Rhythm	Choice Provisions	Netflix Games	
February 1	Life Is Strange Remastered Collection	WIN, PS4, XBO, Stadia		Adventure	Dontnod Entertainment, Deck Nine	Square Enix	
February 1	MotoGP 21	Stadia		Racing	Milestone		
February 2	The Waylanders	WIN		RPG	Gato Studio		
February 2	Webbed	NS, PS4, XBO		Puzzle-platformer	Sbug Games		
February 3	Genkai Tokki: Seven Pirates H (JP)	NS		RPG	Felistella	Compile Heart	
February 3	Sherlock Holmes: Crimes & Punishments	NS		Adventure	Frogwares		
February 3	Ziggurat 2	PS4, PS5		Roguelike, FPS	Milkstone Studios		
February 4	Dying Light 2 Stay Human	WIN, NS, PS4, PS5, XBO, XBX/S	Original	Action RPG, Survival horror	Techland		
February 4	Maglam Lord	NS, PS4		Action RPG	Felistella	PQube	
February 7	Ziggurat 2	NS		Roguelike, FPS	Milkstone Studios		
February 8	Death End Request 2 (NA)	NS		RPG, Visual novel	Compile Heart	Idea Factory	
February 8	OlliOlli World	WIN, NS, PS4, PS5, XBO, XBX/S		Sports	Roll7	Private Division	
February 8	Sifu	WIN, PS4, PS5	Original	Brawler	Sloclap		
February 9	Tails Noir	NS		RPG	EggNut	Raw Fury	
February 9	Cotton Guardian Force Saturn Tribute	WIN		Shoot 'em up	City Connection		
February 9	EarthBound	NS		RPG			
February 9	EarthBound Beginnings	NS		RPG			
February 9	Getsu Fūma Den: Undying Moon	NS		Hack and slash, Roguelike	GuruGuru, Konami	Konami	
February 9	Unbound: Worlds Apart	PS4, PS5		Puzzle-platformer	Alien Pixel Studios		
February 10	Breakout: Recharged	WIN, OSX, LIN, NS, PS4, PS5, XBO, XBX/S, ATRVCS		Action	Adamvision Studios, SneakyBox	Atari	
February 10	CrossfireX	XBO, XBX/S		FPS	Remedy Entertainment, Smilegate	Smilegate	
February 10	Edge of Eternity	PS4, PS5, XBO, XBX/S		RPG	Midgar Studio	Dear Villagers	
February 10	Grapple Dog	WIN, NS		Platformer	Medallion Games	Super Rare Games	
February 10	Heaven Burns Red (JP)	iOS, DROID		RPG	Key, WFS		
February 10	Kingdom Hearts Integrum Masterpiece for Cloud	NS		Action RPG	Square Enix		
February 10	My Hero: Ultra Impact	iOS, DROID		Action RPG	Bandai Namco Entertainment		
February 10	Pajama Sam 2: Thunder and Lightning Aren't so Frightening	NS		Adventure	Humongous Entertainment	UFO Interactive Games	
February 10	Pajama Sam: No Need to Hide When It's Dark Outside	NS		Adventure	Humongous Entertainment	UFO Interactive Games	
February 10	PowerSlave: Exhumed	WIN, NS, PS4, XBO		FPS	Nightdive Studios, Lobotomy Software	Nightdive Studios, Throwback Entertainment	
February 10	Putt-Putt Saves the Zoo	NS		Adventure	Humongous Entertainment	UFO Interactive Games	
February 10	Spy Fox in "Dry Cereal"	NS		Adventure	Humongous Entertainment	UFO Interactive Games	
February 11	Death End Request 2 (EU)	NS		RPG, Visual novel	Compile Heart	Idea Factory	
February 11	Lost Ark	WIN		MMO, RPG	Smilegate	Amazon Games	
February 11	Oddworld: Stranger's Wrath HD	PS4, XBO		Action-adventure	Just Add Water		
February 11	Unbound: Worlds Apart	XBO, XBX/S		Puzzle-platformer	Alien Pixel Studios		
February 11	Ziggurat 2	XBO, XBX/S		Roguelike, FPS	Milkstone Studios		
February 14	Heart of the Woods	PS4, PS5		Visual novel	Studio Élan, Ratalaika Games	Sekai Games	
February 14	Infernax	WIN, NS, PS4, XBO, XBX/S		Action-adventure	Berzerk Studio	The Arcade Crew	
February 14	Monster Prom 2: Monster Camp	NS		Dating sim	Beautiful Glitch		
February 14	River City Girls Zero	NS		Brawler	WayForward	Arc System Works	
February 15	Cyberpunk 2077	PS5, XBX/S		Action RPG	CD Projekt Red		
February 15	Dynasty Warriors 9: Empires	WIN, NS, PS4, PS5, XBO, XBX/S, Stadia		Hack and slash	Omega Force	Koei Tecmo	
February 15	Shadow Madness	WIN		RPG	Crave	Piko Interactive, Bleem!	
February 15	Star Wars: The Old Republic: Legacy of the Sith	WIN		MMO, RPG	BioWare Austin	Electronic Arts	
February 17	Assassin's Creed: The Ezio Collection	NS		Action-adventure	Virtuos	Ubisoft	
February 17	Getsu Fūma Den: Undying Moon	WIN		Hack and slash, Roguelike	GuruGuru, Konami	Konami	
February 17	The King of Fighters XV	WIN, PS4, PS5, XBX/S	Original	Fighting	SNK		
February 17	Total War: Warhammer III	WIN, OSX, LIN		RTS	Creative Assembly	Sega	
February 17	Touken Ranbu Warriors (JP)	WIN, NS		Hack and slash	Omega Force, Ruby Party	DMM Games	
February 17	Voice of Cards: The Forsaken Maiden	WIN, NS, PS4		RPG	Alim	Square Enix	
February 18	Brave Dungeon: The Meaning of Justice	WIN	Early access	RPG	Inside System		
February 18	Horizon Forbidden West	PS4, PS5	Original	Action RPG	Guerrilla Games	Sony Interactive Entertainment	
February 18	Wylde Flowers	OSX		Farming	Studio Drydock		
February 19	Puzzle & Dragons Nintendo Switch Edition	NS		Puzzle, RPG	GungHo Online Entertainment		
February 22	Destiny 2: The Witch Queen	WIN, PS4, PS5, XBO, XBX/S, Stadia		FPS	Bungie		
February 22	Monark (NA)	WIN, NS, PS4, PS5		RPG	Lancarse	NIS America	
February 22	Monster Crown	PS4, XBO		RPG	Aurum	Soedesco	
February 22	Sol Cresta	WIN, NS, PS4		Shoot 'em up	PlatinumGames		
February 23	Edge of Eternity	NS		RPG	Midgar Studio	Dear Villagers	
February 23	Final Fantasy VI Pixel Remaster	WIN, iOS, DROID		RPG	Square Enix		
February 23	Sam & Max: This Time It's Virtual!	PS4		Adventure	HappyGiant	Big Sugar	
February 24	Assetto Corsa Competizione	PS5, XBX/S		Racing	Kunos Simulazioni	505 Games	
February 24	Atelier Sophie 2: The Alchemist of the Mysterious Dream (JP)	WIN, NS, PS4		RPG	Gust	Koei Tecmo	
February 24	Chaos;Child (JP)	NS		Visual novel	Mages		
February 24	Chaos;Head Noah (JP)	NS		Visual novel	Mages		
February 24	Crystar (JP)	NS		Action RPG	Gemdrops	FuRyu	
February 24	Dusk Diver 2	JP: NS, PS4; WW: WIN		Action RPG, Hack and slash	WANIN Games	Justdan International	
February 24	Edens Zero: Pocket Galaxy	iOS, DROID		RPG, Hack and slash	Konami		
February 24	Martha is Dead	WIN, PS4, PS5, XBO, XBX/S		Horror (psych)	LKA	Wired Productions	
February 24	Never Alone: Arctic Edition	NS		Puzzle-platformer	Upper One Games	E-line Media	
February 24	Raiden IV x MIKADO remix (JP)	PS4, PS5		Shoot 'em up	MOSS		
February 24	Roguebook	PS4, PS5, XBO, XBX/S		Roguelike, Deck building	Abrakam Entertainment	Nacon	
February 24	Taito Milestones (JP)	NS		—N/a	Hamster Corporation	Taito	
February 25	Atelier Sophie 2: The Alchemist of the Mysterious Dream	WIN, NS, PS4		RPG	Gust	Koei Tecmo	
February 25	Elden Ring	WIN, PS4, PS5, XBO, XBX/S		Action RPG	FromSoftware	Bandai Namco Entertainment	
February 25	Grid Legends	WIN, PS4, PS5, XBO, XBX/S		Racing	Codemasters	Electronic Arts	
February 25	The Legend of Zelda: Majora's Mask	NS		Action-adventure			
February 25	Monark (EU)	NS, PS4, PS5		RPG	Lancarse	NIS America	
February 25	Moto Roader MC	NS, PS4, PS5, XBO, XBX/S		Racing	Masaya Games, Shinyuden	Masaya Games, Ratalaika Games	
February 28	Guild Wars 2: End of Dragons	WIN		MMO, RPG	ArenaNet	NCSoft	
March 1	Aperture Desk Job	WIN, LIN		Action	Valve		
March 1	Conan Chop Chop	WIN, NS, PS4, XBO		Action-adventure, Roguelike	Mighty Kingdom	Funcom	
March 1	Dawn of the Monsters	Stadia		Brawler	13AM Games	WayForward	
March 1	ELEX II	WIN, PS4, PS5, XBO, XBX/S		Action RPG	Piranha Bytes	THQ Nordic	
March 1	Far: Changing Tides	WIN, NS, PS4, XBO		Adventure	Okomotive	Frontier	
March 1	Ghostwire: Tokyo - Prelude	PS4		Visual novel	Tango Gameworks	Bethesda Softworks	
March 1	Puzzle Quest 3	WIN, iOS, DROID		Puzzle, RPG	Infinity Plus Two	505 Games	
March 1	Shadow Warrior 3	WIN, PS4, XBO		FPS	Flying Wild Hog	Devolver Digital	
March 3	Babylon's Fall	WIN, PS4, PS5		Action RPG	PlatinumGames	Square Enix	
March 4	Gran Turismo 7	PS4, PS5		Racing	Polyphony Digital	Sony Interactive Entertainment	
March 4	Triangle Strategy	NS		Tactical RPG	Artdink, Netchubiyori	JP: Square Enix; WW: Nintendo	
March 8	Ghostwire: Tokyo - Prelude	WIN		Visual novel	Tango Gameworks	Bethesda Softworks	
March 8	SpellForce 3 Reforced	PS4, PS5, XBO, XBX/S		RTS, RPG	Grimlore Games	THQ Nordic	
March 10	.hack//G.U. Last Recode	NS		Action RPG	CyberConnect2	Bandai Namco Entertainment	
March 10	Century: Age of Ashes	XBX/S		Aerial combat, TPS	Playwing		
March 10	Chocobo GP	NS		Racing (kart)	Square Enix		
March 10	Distant Worlds 2	WIN		4X	Code Force	Slitherine Software	
March 10	Iron Lung	WIN		Survival horror, Adventure	David Szymanski		
March 10	République: Anniversary Edition	NS, PS4, PS5		Action-adventure, Stealth	Camouflaj		
March 10	Submerged: Hidden Depths	WIN, PS4, PS5, XBO, XBX/S		Adventure	Uppercut Games		
March 11	Chex Quest HD	NS		FPS	Flight School Studio	General Mills	
March 11	F-Zero X	NS		Racing			
March 11	Poppy Playtime	iOS, DROID		Survival horror	Mob Games		
March 11	WWE 2K22	WIN, PS4, PS5, XBO, XBX/S		Sports	Visual Concepts	2K Sports	
March 14	Bleach: Brave Souls	PS4		Brawler	KLabGames		
March 15	Dawn of the Monsters	WIN, NS, PS4, PS5, XBO, XBX/S		Brawler	13AM Games	WayForward	
March 15	Grand Theft Auto Online	PS5, XBX/S		Action-adventure	Rockstar North	Rockstar Games	
March 15	Grand Theft Auto V	PS5, XBX/S		Action-adventure	Rockstar North	Rockstar Games	
March 15	Phantom Breaker: Omnia	WIN, NS, PS4, XBO		Fighting	GameLoop, Mages	Rocket Panda Games	
March 16	Alien Soldier	NS		Run and gun			
March 16	Light Crusader	NS		Action-adventure			
March 16	Paradise Killer	PS4, PS5, XBO, XBX/S		Adventure	Kaizen Gaming	Fellow Traveller	
March 16	Super Fantasy Zone	NS		Scrolling shooter			
March 16	Tunic	WIN, OSX, XBO, XBX/S		Action-adventure	Andrew Shouldice	Finji	
March 17	ANNO: Mutationem	WIN, PS4, PS5		Action RPG	ThinkingStars	Lightning Games	
March 17	Dance Dance Revolution A3	Arcade		Music, Fitness	Bemani	Konami	
March 17	Dark Deity	NS		Tactical RPG	Sword & Axe LLC	Freedom Games	
March 17	Gal Gun: Double Peace	NS		Shoot 'em up (rail)	Inti Creates	PQube	
March 17	Monster Energy Supercross: The Official Videogame 5	WIN, PS4, PS5, XBO, XBX/S		Racing	Milestone		
March 17	Neptuna x Senran Kagura: Ninja Wars (JP)	NS		RPG	Idea Factory, Compile Heart, Tamsoft	Compile Heart	
March 17	Persona 4 Arena Ultimax	WIN, NS, PS4		Fighting	Arc System Works, P-Studio	Atlus	
March 18	Kowloon High-School Chronicle	PS4		Dungeon crawl, RPG, Visual novel, Puzzle	Toybox Inc.	Arc System Works	
March 18	Stranger of Paradise: Final Fantasy Origin	WIN, PS4, PS5, XBO, XBX/S		Action RPG	Team Ninja	Square Enix	
March 18	Syberia: The World Before	WIN		Adventure	Microids		
March 22	Rune Factory 5 (NA)	NS		RPG, Simulation	Hakama	Xseed Games	
March 22	Tempest 4000	NS, ATRVCS		Shoot 'em up	Llamasoft	Atari	
March 23	Hatsune Miku Jigsaw Puzzle	NS		Puzzle	Crypton Future Media		
March 24	The Ascent	PS4, PS5		Action RPG	Neon Giant	Curve Digital	
March 24	Dungeon & Fighter Mobile	iOS, DROID, WIN		Action RPG	Neople	Nexon	
March 24	A Memoir Blue	WIN, NS, PS4, PS5, XBO, XBX/S		Adventure	Cloisters Interactive	Annapurna Interactive	
March 24	Miss Kobayashi's Dragon Maid: Sakuretsu!! Chorogon Breath (JP)	NS, PS4		Shoot 'em up	Bushiroad		
March 24	Norco	WIN, OSX		Adventure	Geography of Robots	Raw Fury	
March 24	The Planet Crafter	WIN	Early access	Survival	Miju Games		
March 24	Relayer	PS4, PS5		Tactical RPG	Kadokawa Games	JP: Kadokawa Games; WW: Clouded Leopard Entertainment	
March 24	Tentacular	WIN		Action-adventure, Puzzle	Firepunchd	Devolver Digital	
March 25	Adventure Time: Pirates of the Enchiridion	Stadia		Action-adventure	Climax Studios	Outright Games	
March 25	Andro Dunos II	3DS, WIN, NS, PS4		Shoot 'em up	Picorinne Soft	Just For Games, PixelHeart	
March 25	Ghostwire: Tokyo	WIN, PS5	Original	Action-adventure	Tango Gameworks	Bethesda Softworks	
March 25	Kirby and the Forgotten Land	NS		Platformer	HAL Laboratory	Nintendo	
March 25	Rune Factory 5 (EU)	NS		RPG, Simulation	Hakama	Marvelous Europe	
March 25	Tiny Tina's Wonderlands	WIN, PS4, PS5, XBO, XBX/S		Action RPG, FPS	Gearbox Software	2K Games	
March 26	Kowloon High-School Chronicle (NA)	PS4		Dungeon crawl, RPG, Visual novel, Puzzle	Toybox Inc.	Arc System Works	
March 29	Apex Legends	PS5, XBX/S		Battle royale, Hero shooter, FPS	Respawn Entertainment	Electronic Arts	
March 29	Crusader Kings III	PS5, XBX/S		Strategy	Paradox Development Studio, Lab42	Paradox Interactive	
March 29	Crystar (NA)	NS		Action RPG	Gemdrops	NIS America	
March 29	Jitsu Squad	WIN		Brawler	Tanuki Creative Studio		
March 29	Patrick's Parabox	WIN, OSX, LIN		Puzzle	Patrick Taynor		
March 29	Shiren the Wanderer: The Tower of Fortune and the Dice of Fate (JP)	iOS, DROID		Roguelike, RPG	Spike Chunsoft		
March 29	WRC 10	NS		Racing	Kylotonn	Nacon	
March 30	Big Bang Pro Wrestling	NS		Fighting	SNK		
March 30	Bokujō Monogatari (JP)	NS		Farming			
March 30	Dead Man's Diary	WIN		Adventure, Survival	TML-Studios		
March 30	Death Stranding Director's Cut	WIN		Action	Kojima Productions	505 Games	
March 30	Dig Dug II	NS		Action			
March 30	Earthworm Jim 2	NS		Platformer, Run and gun			
March 30	Mappy-Land	NS		Platformer			
March 31	Cosmonious High	WIN		Adventure	Owlchemy Labs		
March 31	G-Darius HD	WIN		Shoot 'em up	Taito, M2	Taito	
March 31	Hero Dice (JP)	iOS, DROID		Digital tabletop, Strategy	Tango Gameworks	Zenimax Asia	
March 31	Lawn Mowing Simulator	PS4, PS5		Simulation	Skyhook Games	Curve Games	
March 31	Moss: Book II	PS4		Adventure, Puzzle	Polyarc		
March 31	Real Heroes: Firefighter HD	XBO		FPS	Sickhead Games	Ziggurat Interactive	
March 31	Rovio Classics: Angry Birds	DROID, iOS	Remake	Puzzle	Rovio Entertainment		
March 31	Tropico 6	PS5, XBX/S		CMS, Government sim	Realmforge Studios	Kalypso Media	
March 31	Weird West	WIN, PS4, XBO		Action RPG	WolfEye Studios	Devolver Digital	

=== April-June ===
Release date	Title	Platform	Type	Genre	Developer	Publisher	Ref.
April 1	Crystar (EU)	NS		Action RPG	Gemdrops	NIS America	
April 5	Before We Leave	PS4, PS5		City builder	Balancing Monkey Games	Team17	
April 5	Lego Star Wars: The Skywalker Saga	WIN, NS, PS4, PS5, XBO, XBX/S		Action-adventure	Traveller's Tales	Warner Bros. Interactive Entertainment	
April 5	MLB The Show 22	NS, PS4, PS5, XBO, XBX/S		Sports	San Diego Studio	Sony Interactive Entertainment, MLB Advanced Media	
April 5	World War Z: Aftermath	Stadia		TPS, FPS	Saber Interactive		
April 7	Chinatown Detective Agency	WIN, OSX, NS, XBO		Adventure	General Interactive Co.	Humble Games	
April 7	Chrono Cross: The Radical Dreamers Edition	WIN, NS, PS4, XBO		RPG	Square Enix		
April 7	Eschatos	PS4		Scrolling shooter	Qute Corporation		
April 7	Godfall: Ultimate Edition	WIN, PS4, PS5, XBO, XBX/S		Action RPG	Counterplay Games	Gearbox Publishing	
April 7	The House of the Dead: Remake	NS		Shoot 'em up (rail), Light gun shooter	MegaPixel Studio	Forever Entertainment	
April 7	Knights in the Nightmare Remaster (JP)	NS		RPG, RTS	Sting Entertainment		
April 7	Sherlock Holmes: The Devil's Daughter	NS		Adventure	Frogwares		
April 7	Total War: Medieval II	iOS, DROID		RTT, TBS	Feral Interactive		
April 8	Lake	PS4, PS5		Graphic adventure	Gamious	Whitethorn Games	
April 8	Metal Dogs (JP)	NS, PS4		Roguelike, Action	24Frame	Kadokawa Games	
April 8	Serious Sam: Tormental	WIN		Shoot 'em up, Roguelike	Gungrounds	Devolver Digital	
April 11	Danganronpa V3: Killing Harmony Anniversary Edition	iOS, DROID		Adventure, Visual novel	Spike Chunsoft		
April 11	Ib (remake)	WIN		Adventure	kouri	Playism	
April 12	13 Sentinels: Aegis Rim	NS		Adventure, RTS	Vanillaware	Atlus	
April 12	Don't Starve Together	NS		Survival	Klei Entertainment		
April 13	Blast Brigade vs. the Evil Legion of Dr. Cread	WIN, NS, PS4, PS5, XBO, XBX/S		Metroidvania	Allods Team Arcade	My.Games	
April 14	Battle Spirits: Connected Battlers (JP)	NS, PS4		DCCG	FuRyu		
April 14	Demon Turf: Neon Splash	WIN, NS		Platformer	Fabraz	Playtonic Friends	
April 14	Golf with Your Friends	Stadia		Casual, Sports	Team17		
April 14	Gotta Protectors: Cart of Darkness	NS		Tower defense, Action	Ancient	8-4	
April 14	Light: Black Cat & Amnesia Girl	WIN	Original	Adventure, Puzzle	Daylight Studio		
April 14	Nobody Saves the World	NS, PS4, PS5		Action RPG	Drinkbox Studios		
April 14	Road 96	PS4, PS5, XBO, XBX/S		Adventure	DigixArt		
April 14	Winning Post 9 2022 (JP)	WIN, NS, PS4		Simulation	Koei Tecmo		
April 15	Mario Golf	NS		Sports			
April 18	Turnip Boy Commits Tax Evasion	XBO		Action-adventure	Snoozy Kazoo	Graffiti Games	
April 19	Lego Builder's Journey	PS4, PS5		Puzzle	Light Brick Studio	The Lego Group	
April 19	Neptuna x Senran Kagura: Ninja Wars	NS		RPG	Idea Factory, Compile Heart, Tamsoft	Idea Factory	
April 20	Liberated: Enhanced Edition	PS4, XBO, XBX/S		Action-adventure	Atomic Wolf, L.INC	Walkabout	
April 20	Postal 4: No Regerts	WIN		FPS	Running with Scissors		
April 20	Star Wars: The Force Unleashed	NS		Action-adventure, Hack and slash	Krome Studios	Aspyr	
April 21	Chernobylite	PS5, XBX/S		Sports	The Farm 51	All in! Games	
April 21	eBASEBALL Powerful Pro Baseball 2022 (JP)	NS, PS4		Sports	Konami		
April 21	Hyperdimension Neptunia: Sisters vs. Sisters (JP)	PS4, PS5		RPG	Compile Heart		
April 21	Lumote: The Mastermote Chronicles	WIN, NS, PS4, XBO		Puzzle-platformer	Luminawesome Games	Wired Productions	
April 21	MotoGP 22	WIN, NS, PS4, PS5, XBO, XBX/S		Racing	Milestone		
April 21	Pocky & Rocky Reshrined (JP)	NS, PS4		Shoot 'em up	Natsume Atari	Natsume Atari	
April 21	Roguebook	NS		Deck building (roguelike)	Abrakam Entertainment	Nacon	
April 21	Shining Force II	NS		Tactical RPG			
April 21	Sonic Spinball	NS		Pinball			
April 21	Space Harrier II	NS		Shoot 'em up (rail)			
April 21	Teardown	WIN		Puzzle, Action	Tuxedo Labs		
April 21	Yomawari 3 (JP)	NS, PS4		Sports	Nippon Ichi Software		
April 22	Ganryu 2: Hakuma Kojiro	WIN, NS, PS4, XBO		Platformer, Action	Storybird Studio	Just For Games, PixelHeart	
April 22	Skábma: Snowfall	WIN		Adventure	Red Stage Entertainment	PID Games	
April 25	Ragnorium	WIN		CMS	Vitali Kirpu	Devolver Digital	
April 26	Demon Gaze Extra	WIN		RPG, Dungeon crawl	Kadokawa Games	Clouded Leopard Entertainment	
April 26	Galactic Civilizations IV	WIN		4X, TBS	Stardock		
April 26	King Arthur: Knight's Tale	WIN		Tactical RPG	NeocoreGames		
April 26	Zombie Army 4: Dead War	NS		TPS, Sports	Rebellion Developments		
April 27	Echoes of Mana	iOS, DROID		Action RPG	WFS	Square Enix	
April 27	The Stanley Parable: Ultra Deluxe	WIN, OSX, LIN, NS, PS4, PS5, XBO, XBX/S		Adventure	Galactic Cafe	Crows Crows Crows	
April 27	Vampire: The Masquerade – Bloodhunt	WIN, PS5		Battle royale	Sharkmob		
April 28	Age of Empires II: Definitive Edition – Dynasties of India	WIN		RTS	Forgotten Empires	Xbox Game Studios	
April 28	Bugsnax	NS, XBO, XBX/S		Adventure	Young Horses		
April 28	Cricket 22	NS		Sports	Big Ant Studios	Nacon	
April 28	Dorfromantik	WIN		Puzzle, City builder	Toukana Interactive		
April 28	Haiku the Robot	WIN, OSX		Metroidvania	Mister Morris Games		
April 28	The House of the Dead: Remake	WIN, PS4, XBO, Stadia		Shoot 'em up (rail), Light gun shooter	MegaPixel Studio	Forever Entertainment	
April 28	Layer Section & Galactic Attack S-Tribute	WIN, NS, PS4, XBO		Shoot 'em up	City Connection		
April 28	Parkasaurus	NS		CMS	Washbear Studio		
April 28	Rogue Legacy 2	WIN, XBO, XBX/S		Platformer, Roguelike	Cellar Door Games		
April 28	Sherlock Holmes Chapter One	PS4		Action-adventure	Frogwares		
April 29	Deadly Dozen Reloaded	WIN		Tactical shooter	nFusion Interactive	Ziggurat Interactive	
April 29	Nintendo Switch Sports	NS		Sports	Nintendo EPD	Nintendo	
April 29	Ravenous Devils	WIN, NS, PS4, PS5, XBO, XBX/S		Horror, Cooking	Bad Vices Games	Bad Vices Games, Troglobytes Games	
April 29	Space Warlord Organ Trading Simulator	NS		Business sim	Strange Scaffold		
May 1	Lumote: The Mastermote Chronicles	Stadia		Puzzle-platformer	Wired Productions		
May 2	Takkoman: Kouzatsu World	WIN		Bullet hell, Action	illuCalab	Playism	
May 3	Dungeon Defenders: Awakened	PS4		Action RPG, Tower defense	Chromatic Games		
May 3	Loot River	WIN, XBO, XBX/S		Action, Roguelike	straka.studio		
May 4	Wildcat Gun Machine	WIN, NS, PS4, XBO		Bullet hell, Dungeon crawl	Chunkybox Games	Daedalic Entertainment	
May 5	Citizen Sleeper	WIN, OSX, NS, XBO, XBX/S		RPG	Jump Over the Age	Fellow Traveller	
May 5	Overcooked: All You Can Eat Edition	Stadia		Simulation	Team17		
May 5	Poppy Playtime: Chapter Two	WIN, iOS, DROID		Sports	MOB Games		
May 5	RiffTrax: The Game	WIN, OSX, NS, PS4, XBO		Party	Wide Right Interactive		
May 5	Trek to Yomi	WIN, PS4, PS5, XBO, XBX/S		Action-adventure	Flying Wild Hog	Devolver Digital	
May 5	Warhammer 40,000: Chaos Gate - Daemonhunters	WIN		TBS	Complex Games	Frontier Foundry	
May 6	Crowns and Pawns: Kingdom of Deceit	WIN, OSX, LIN		PCA	Tag of Joy	Headup Games	
May 6	Elemental War 2	WIN, OSX, LIN, PS4, PS5, XBO, XBX/S, Stadia		Tower defense	Clockwork Origins		
May 8	Valkyrie of Phantasm Prelude (JP)	WIN		Bullet hell	Areazero		
May 10	Danganronpa 2: Goodbye Despair Anniversary Edition	WIN, XBO, XBX/S		Adventure, Visual novel	Spike Chunsoft		
May 10	Eiyuden Chronicle: Rising	WIN, NS, PS4, PS5, XBO, XBX/S		Action RPG	Rabbit & Bear Studios	505 Games	
May 10	Prinny Presents NIS Classics Volume 2 (NA)	WIN, NS		Tactical RPG	Nippon Ichi Software		
May 10	Salt and Sacrifice	WIN, PS4, PS5		Action RPG, Metroidvania	Ska Studios		
May 10	This War of Mine: Final Cut	PS5, XBX/S		Survival	11 bit studios		
May 10	Unpacking	PS4, PS5		Puzzle	Witch Beam	Humble Bundle	
May 10	We Were Here Forever	WIN		Puzzle, Adventure	Total Mayhem Games		
May 10	Wolfstride	NS		RPG	OTA IMON Studio	Raw Fury	
May 11	Brigandine: The Legend of Runersia	WIN		Tactical RPG	Matrix Software	Happinet	
May 11	Gibbon: Beyond the Trees	NS		Adventure	Broken Rules		
May 11	Mini Motorways	NS		Puzzle, Strategy	Dinosaur Polo Club		
May 11	Neptuna x Senran Kagura: Ninja Wars	WIN		RPG	Idea Factory, Compile Heart, Tamsoft	JP: Compile Heat; WW: Idea Factory	
May 11	Opus: Echo of Starsong - Full Bloom Edition	NS		Adventure, Visual novel	Sigono		
May 11	Soundfall	WIN, NS, PS4, PS5, XBO, XBX/S		Rhythm, Looter shooter	Drastic Games	Noodlecake Studios	
May 11	Source of Madness	WIN, NS, PS4, PS5, XBO, XBX/S		Horror, Roguelike	Carry Castle	Thunderful Games	
May 12	The Centennial Case: A Shijima Story	WIN, NS, PS4, PS5		Adventure	h.a.n.d.	Square Enix	
May 12	Gravitar: Recharged	ATRVCS		Shoot 'em up	Adamvision Studios, SneakyBox	Atari	
May 12	Ninja JaJaMaru: The Great Yokai Battle + Hell	WIN		Action, Platformer	City Connection		
May 12	Seven Pirates H	NS		RPG	Felistella	eastasiasoft	
May 12	Vesper: Zero Light Edition	WIN, NS		Puzzle-platformer	Cordens Interactive		
May 13	Evil Dead: The Game	WIN, NS, PS4, PS5, XBO, XBX/S		Horror	Boss Team Games	Saber Interactive	
May 13	Prinny Presents NIS Classics Volume 2 (EU)	WIN, NS		Tactical RPG	Nippon Ichi Software		
May 17	Apex Legends Mobile	iOS, DROID		Battle royale, FPS, Hero shooter	Respawn Entertainment, LightSpeed Studios	Electronic Arts	
May 17	Cities: Skylines	Stadia		City builder, CMS	Tantalus Media	Paradox Interactive	
May 17	Far Cry Primal	Stadia		Action-adventure	Ubisoft		
May 17	Outward: Definitive Edition	WIN, PS5, XBX/S		RPG	Nine Dots	Prime Matter	
May 17	Umurangi Generation: Special Edition	XBO		Photography	Origame Digital	Playism	
May 18	Gibbon: Beyond the Trees	WIN, OSX		Adventure	Broken Rules		
May 18	Gunfire Reborn	iOS, DROID		Roguelike, FPS	Duoyi Games	Liwei Network	
May 19	Contract Killer	WIN		Brawler	Paperboy Games	Behemoth Interactive	
May 19	Deadcraft	WIN, NS, PS4, PS5, XBO, XBX/S		Survival, Action	Marvelous First Studio	Xseed Games	
May 19	Endzone - A World Apart: Survivor Edition	PS5, XBX/S		City builder	Gentlymad Studios	Assemble Entertainment	
May 19	Eternal Threads	WIN		Puzzle	Cosmonaut Studios	Secret Mode	
May 19	Fire Dragon Fist Master Xiao-Mei (JP)	NS		Action	PiXEL		
May 19	The Future You've Been Dreaming Of	NS		Simulation	qureate		
May 19	A Monster's Expedition	PS4, PS5		Puzzle, Adventure	Draknek & Friends		
May 19	Norn9: Last Era (JP)	iOS, DROID		Visual novel	Regista	Idea Factory	
May 19	Norn9: Nonette (JP)	iOS, DROID		Visual novel	Regista	Idea Factory	
May 19	Old World	LIN		TBS, 4X	Mohawk Games	Hooded Horse	
May 19	Snow Bros. Special	NS		Platformer	CRT Games	Daewon Media Game Lab	
May 19	Taiko Risshiden V DX (JP)	WIN, NS		TBS	Kou Shibusawa	Koei Tecmo	
May 19	They Always Run	NS, PS4, XBO		Platformer	Alawar		
May 19	Vampire: The Masquerade – Swansong	WIN, NS, PS4, PS5, XBO, XBX/S		RPG	Big Bad Wolf	Nacon	
May 20	Cotton Fantasy	NS, PS4		Scrolling shooter	Success	ININ Games	
May 20	Dolmen	WIN, PS4, PS5, XBO, XBX/S		Action RPG	Massive Work Studio	Prime Matter	
May 20	Kirby 64: The Crystal Shards	NS		Platformer			
May 22	Drainus	WIN		Shoot 'em up	Team Ladybug	Playism, WSS Playground	
May 24	Floppy Knights	WIN, OSX, XBO		TBS, Deck building	Rose City Games		
May 24	Hardspace: Shipbreaker	WIN		Simulation	Blackbird Interactive	Focus Entertainment	
May 24	Streets of Rage 4	iOS, DROID		Brawler	Dotemu	Playdigious	
May 24	Touken Ranbu Warriors	WIN, NS		Hack and slash	Omega Force, Ruby Party	Koei Tecmo, DMM Games	
May 24	Turnip Boy Commits Tax Evasion	iOS, DROID		Action-adventure	Snoozy Kazoo	Graffiti Games	
May 25	Catalyst Black	iOS, DROID		Hero shooter	Super Evil Megacorp		
May 25	Ni no Kuni: Cross Worlds	iOS, DROID, WIN		RPG	Netmarble	Level-5	
May 25	Roller Champions	WIN, PS4, XBO		Sports	Ubisoft Montreal	Ubisoft	
May 25	Yurukill: The Calumniation Games (JP)	NS, PS4, PS5		Shoot 'em up	G.rev	Izanagi Games	
May 26	Age of Empires III: Definitive Edition – Knights of the Mediterranean	WIN		RTS	Tantalus Media, Forgotten Empires	Xbox Game Studios	
May 26	Biomotor Unitron	NS		RPG	SNK		
May 26	Congo's Caper	NS		Action, Platformer			
May 26	Dragon Quest Builders	iOS, DROID		Action RPG, Sandbox	Square Enix		
May 26	Hatsune Miku: Project DIVA Mega Mix+	WIN		Rhythm	Sega		
May 26	The Legend of Nayuta: Boundless Trails (JP)	NS		Action RPG, Hack and slash	PH3 GmbH	Nippon Ichi Software	
May 26	Out There: Oceans of Time	WIN		Adventure	Mi-Clos Studio	Modern Wolf	
May 26	Pinball	NS		Pinball			
May 26	Radiant Tale (JP)	NS		Visual novel	Design Factory	Idea Factory	
May 26	Rival Turf!	NS		Brawler			
May 26	Senren Banka: A Thousand Colors of Love (JP)	NS		Visual novel	Nekonyan	Yuzusoft	
May 26	Sniper Elite 5	WIN, PS4, PS5, XBO, XBX/S	Original	TPS	Rebellion Developments		
May 26	Umihara Kawase (JP)	NS		Platformer			
May 27	Arcade Spirits: The New Challengers	WIN, OSX, LIN, NS, PS4, PS5, XBO, XBX/S		Visual novel	Fiction Factory Games	PQube	
May 27	Fault - StP - Lightkravte	WIN, OSX, LIN		Visual novel	Alice in Dissonance	Phoenixx	
May 27	Kao the Kangaroo	WIN, NS, PS4, PS5, XBO, XBX/S		Platformer	Tate Multimedia		
May 27	My Little Pony: A Maretime Bay Adventure	WIN, NS, PS4, XBO, XBX/S		Adventure	Melbot Studios	Outright Games	
May 27	Pac-Man Museum +	WIN, NS, PS4, XBO		Action	Bandai Namco Entertainment		
May 27	Unexplored 2: The Wayfarer's Legacy	WIN		RPG	Ludomotion	Big Sugar	
May 31	Destroy All Humans! Clone Carnage	WIN, PS4, XBO		Action-adventure	Black Forest Games	THQ Nordic	
May 31	SnowRunner	PS5, XBX/S		Vehicle sim	Saber Interactive	Focus Home Interactive	
June 1	The Big Con: Grift of the Year Edition	NS		Adventure	Mighty Yell	Skybound Games	
June 1	Deathrun TV	WIN, OSX, NS, Stadia		Roguelike, Shoot 'em up (twin stick)	Laser Dog	Merge Games	
June 1	Deliver Us the Moon	Stadia		Adventure	KeokeN Interactive	Wired Productions	
June 1	Lake	Stadia		Graphic adventure	Whitethorn Digital		
June 1	Silt	WIN, NS, PS4, PS5, XBO, XBX/S		Adventure, Puzzle	Spiral Circus	Fireshine Games	
June 1	Through the Darkest of Times	Stadia		Strategy	Massive Miniteam	HandyGames	
June 2	Behind the Frame: The Finest Scenery	NS, PS4		Adventure	Silver Lining Studio	Akupara Games, Akatsuki Taiwan, Inc.	
June 2	Card Shark	WIN, NS		Adventure	Nerial	Devolver Digital	
June 2	Diablo Immortal	iOS, DROID, WIN		Action RPG	Blizzard Entertainment, NetEase	Blizzard Entertainment	
June 2	Fishing Paradiso	WIN, OSX, LIN, NS		Fishing, RPG	Odencat		
June 2	Gigapocalypse	NS, PS4, XBO		Action	Goody Gameworks	Headup	
June 2	Gravitar: Recharged	WIN, OSX, LIN, NS, PS4, PS5, XBO, XBX/S, iOS, DROID		Shoot 'em up	Adamvision Studios, SneakyBox	Atari	
June 2	Jim Power: The Lost Dimension in 3-D	NS, PS4		Platformer	Piko Interactive	QUByte Interactive	
June 2	Souldiers	WIN, NS, PS4, PS5, XBO, XBX/S		Action RPG	Retro Forge	Dear Villagers	
June 2	Tokoyo: The Tower of Perpetuity	WIN, NS		Action, Roguelike	//commentout	Playism	
June 3	Frogger and the Rumbling Ruins	iOS		Puzzle	Q-Games	Konami	
June 3	Loopers	NS		Visual novel	Key	Prototype	
June 3	The Quintessential Quintuplets: Five Memories Spent With You (JP)	NS, PS4		Visual novel	Mages		
June 3	Unexplored 2: The Wayfarer's Legacy	XBO, XBX/S		RPG	Ludomotion	Big Sugar	
June 3	Wonder Boy Collection	NS, PS4		Platformer, Action RPG	Bliss Brain	ININ Games	
June 6	The Elder Scrolls Online: High Isle	WIN, OSX, Stadia		MMO, RPG	ZeniMax Online Studios	Bethesda Softworks	
June 6	Kemono Friends 3 (JP)	PS4		RPG	Appirits		
June 6	Lost Ruins	NS, PS4, XBO		Metroidvania, Action	Altari Games	Dangen Entertainment	
June 7	20 Minutes Till Dawn	WIN, OSX, iOS, DROID		Roguelike, Shoot 'em up	Flanne		
June 7	Disc Room	XBO		Action, Puzzle	Terri, Rose, Kitty, and JW	Devolver Digital	
June 7	Spacelines from the Far Out	WIN, XBO		Roguelike, Simulation	Coffeenauts	Skystone Games	
June 8	The Cycle: Frontier	WIN		FPS	Yager Development		
June 8	My Lovely Wife	WIN, NS		Simulation	GameChanger Studio, Toge Productions	Neon Doctrine	
June 8	Noel the Mortal Fate	PS4		Adventure	Kawano, Vaka Game Magazine	Vaka Game Magazine	
June 8	Star Wars Knights of the Old Republic II: The Sith Lords	NS		RPG	Obsidian Entertainment	LucasArts	
June 8	Super Impossible Road	PS4, PS5, XBO, XBX/S		Racing	Wonderful Lasers	Rogue Games	
June 9	Demon Slayer: Kimetsu no Yaiba – The Hinokami Chronicles (JP)	NS		Fighting	CyberConnect2	Aniplex	
June 9	Even If Tempest	NS		Visual novel	Voltage		
June 9	Industria	PS5, XBX/S		FPS	Bleakmill	Headup	
June 9	Orcs Must Die! 3	PS5		Tower defense, Action	Robot Entertainment		
June 9	Postal: Brain Damaged	WIN		FPS	Hyperstrange	Running with Scissors	
June 9	Pro Cycling Manager 2022	WIN		Simulation	Cyanide Studio	Nacon	
June 9	Spacelines from the Far Out	OSX, LIN		Roguelike, Simulation	Coffeenauts	Skystone Games	
June 9	Tour de France 22	WIN, PS4, PS5, XBO, XBX/S		Sports	Cyanide Studio	Nacon	
June 10	Demon Slayer: Kimetsu no Yaiba – The Hinokami Chronicles	NS		Fighting	CyberConnect2	Sega	
June 10	Freshly Frosted	WIN, OSX, NS, PS4, PS5, XBO, XBX/S		Puzzle	The Quantum Astrophysicists Guild		
June 10	Mario Strikers: Battle League	NS		Sports	Next Level Games	Nintendo	
June 10	Metal Max Xeno Reborn	WIN, NS, PS4		RPG	24Frame, Cattle Call, Kadokawa Games	PQube	
June 10	Meteor World Actor: Badge & Dagger	WIN		Visual novel	Heliodor	Shiravune	
June 10	The Origin: Blind Maid	PS4		Horror	Waraní Studios	Badland Publishing	
June 10	Please Fix the Road	WIN		Puzzle	Arielek	Silesia Games	
June 10	Poinpy	iOS, DROID		Action, Platformer	Moppin	Devolver Digital	
June 10	The Quarry	WIN, PS4, PS5, XBO, XBX/S	Original	Horror	Supermassive Games	2K Games	
June 10	Symphony of War: The Nephilim Saga	WIN		RPG	Dancing Dragon Games	Freedom Games	
June 11	Deadly Premonition 2: A Blessing in Disguise	WIN		Sports	Toybox	Rising Star Games	
June 11	LumbearJack	WIN, NS		Puzzle, Adventure	FinalBoss Games	Armor Games Studios	
June 13	Jumanji: The Curse Returns	NS		Digital tabletop, Deck building	Marmalade Game Studio		
June 13	Resident Evil 2	PS5, XBX/S	Port	Survival horror	Capcom		
June 13	Resident Evil 3	PS5, XBX/S	Port	Survival horror	Capcom		
June 13	Resident Evil 7: Biohazard	PS5, XBX/S	Port	Survival horror	Capcom		
June 14	Discovery Tour: Viking Age	Stadia		Educational	Ubisoft		
June 14	The Hand of Merlin	WIN, OSX, LIN, NS, PS4, PS5, XBO, XBX/S		TBS, Roguelike	Room-C Games, Croteam	Versus Evil	
June 14	Kids on Site Hard Hat Edition	WIN, PS4		Interactive film	Screaming Villains		
June 14	LumbearJack	XBO, XBX/S		Puzzle, Adventure	FinalBoss Games	Armor Games Studios	
June 15	Blackguards 2	NS		TBT, Tactical RPG	Daedalic Entertainment		
June 15	Deathrun TV	PS5		Roguelike, Shoot 'em up (twin stick)	Laser Dog	Merge Games	
June 16	Astro Aqua Kitty	PS5		Action RPG	Tikipod		
June 16	Autonauts	NS, PS4, PS5, XBO, XBX/S		Action-adventure	Denki	Curve Games	
June 16	Cloud Gardens	NS		Sandbox, Simulation	Noio	Coatsink	
June 16	Disgaea 6 Complete (JP)	PS5		Tactical RPG	Nippon Ichi Software		
June 16	Frozenheim	WIN		City builder, RTS	Paranoid Interactive	Hyperstrange	
June 16	The Gardens Between	PS5		Puzzle	The Voxel Agents		
June 16	Horgihugh and Friends	NS		Shoot 'em up	PiXEL	Aksys Games	
June 16	Neon White	WIN, NS		FPS, Action	Angel Matrix	Annapurna Interactive	
June 16	Overlord: Escape from Nazarick	WIN, NS		Metroidvania	Engines	Kadokawa Games	
June 16	Redout 2	WIN, NS, PS4, PS5, XBO, XBX/S		Racing	34BigThings	Saber Interactive	
June 16	Starship Troopers: Terran Command	WIN		RTS	The Aristocrats	Slitherine Software	
June 16	Teenage Mutant Ninja Turtles: Shredder's Revenge	WIN, LIN, NS, PS4, XBO		Brawler	Tribute Games	Dotemu	
June 16	Zorro - The Chronicles	WIN, NS, PS4, PS5, XBO, XBX/S, Stadia		Adventure	PVP Games, BKOM Studios	Nacon	
June 17	Cooking Mama: Cuisine!	iOS		Cooking, Minigame	Office Create		
June 17	Final Fantasy VII Remake Intergrade	WIN		Action RPG	Square Enix		
June 17	Final Vendetta	WIN, OSX, LIN, NS, PS4, PS5, XBO, XBX/S		Brawler	Bitmap Bureau	Numskull Games	
June 17	Omori	NS, XBO, XBX/S		RPG, Horror (psych)	Omocat LLC	Playism	
June 20	Raft	WIN		Survival	Redbeet Interactive	Axolot Games	
June 21	The Elder Scrolls Online: High Isle	PS4, PS5, XBO, XBX/S		MMO, RPG	ZeniMax Online Studios	Bethesda Softworks	
June 21	Fall Guys	NS, PS5, XBO, XBX/S		Battle royale, Platformer	Mediatonic	Epic Games	
June 21	The Game of Life 2	PS4, PS5		Digital tabletop	Marmalade Game Studio		
June 21	The King of Fighters '98 Ultimate Match Final Edition	PS4		Fighting	Code Mystics	SNK	
June 21	Milky Way Prince - The Vampire Star	NS, PS4, PS5, XBX/S		Visual novel	Lorenzo Redaelli, Eyeguys	Santa Ragione, Fantastico Studio	
June 21	Roller Champions	NS		Sports	Ubisoft Montreal	Ubisoft	
June 21	Shadowrun Trilogy	NS, PS4, PS5, XBO, XBX/S		Tactical RPG	Harebrained Schemes	Paradox Interactive	
June 21	Wreckfest	NS		Racing, Vehicular combat	Bugbear Entertainment	THQ Nordic	
June 22	Firegirl: Hack 'n Splash Rescue DX	WIN, NS, PS4, PS5, XBO, XBX/S		Roguelike, Platformer	Dejima	Thunderful Publishing	
June 23	9-Nine (JP)	NS, PS4		Visual novel	Palette		
June 23	Aiyoku no Eustia (JP)	NS, PS4		Visual novel	August	Entergram	
June 23	Blade Runner: Enhanced Edition	WIN, NS, PS4, XBO		PCA	Nightdive Studios	Nightdive Studios	
June 23	The Caligula Effect 2	WIN		RPG	historia, FuRyu	historia	
June 23	Deliver Us the Moon	PS5, XBX/S		Adventure	KeokeN Interactive	Wired Productions	
June 23	Disney Mirrorverse	iOS, DROID		Action RPG	Kabam		
June 23	Elysion: Feeling of Release (JP)	NS		Visual novel	Utp		
June 23	Hatsune Miku Jigsaw Puzzle	WIN, XBO		Puzzle	Crypton Future Media		
June 23	Inscryption	OSX, LIN		Deck building (roguelike)	Daniel Mullins Games	Devolver Digital	
June 23	Japanese Rail Sim: Journey to Kyoto	WIN		Vehicle sim (train)	Sonic Powered		
June 23	Naraka: Bladepoint	XBX/S		Action-adventure, Battle royale	24 Entertainment, Thunder Fire Universe X Studio	NetEase Games	
June 23	Sonic Origins	WIN, NS, PS4, PS5, XBO, XBX/S		Platformer	Sonic Team	Sega	
June 24	AI: The Somnium Files – Nirvana Initiative (NA)	WIN, NS, PS4, XBO		Adventure	Spike Chunsoft		
June 24	Air Twister	iOS		Shoot 'em up	YS Net		
June 24	Capcom Fighting Collection	WIN, NS, PS4, XBO		Fighting	Capcom		
June 24	Fadeout: Underground	WIN		TPS	Weston Mitchell		
June 24	Fire Emblem Warriors: Three Hopes	NS		Hack and slash, RPG	Omega Force	Nintendo	
June 24	Omori (NA)	PS4		RPG, Horror (psych)	Omocat LLC	Playism	
June 24	Pocky & Rocky Reshrined	NS, PS4		Shoot 'em up	Natsume Atari	Natsume Inc.	
June 24	Pokémon Snap	NS		Photography			
June 28	Birushana: Rising Flower of Genpei (NA)	NS		Visual novel	Idea Factory		
June 28	Disgaea 6 Complete	WIN, PS4, PS5		Tactical RPG	Nippon Ichi Software		
June 28	DNF Duel	WIN, PS4, PS5		Fighting	Neople, Eighting, Arc System Works	Nexon	
June 28	Fobia - St. Dinfna Hotel	WIN, PS4, PS5, XBO, XBX/S		Sports	Pulsatrix Studios	Maximum Games	
June 28	Little Noah: Scion of Paradise	WIN, NS, PS4		Roguelike, Action	Cygames, Grounding Inc.	Cygames	
June 28	MX vs. ATV Legends	WIN, PS4, PS5, XBO, XBX/S		Racing	Rainbow Studios	THQ Nordic	
June 28	My Little Pony: A Maretime Bay Adventure	Stadia		Adventure	Casual Brothers	Outright Games Ltd.	
June 28	Portal: Companion Collection	NS		Puzzle-platformer	Valve		
June 29	Azure Striker Gunvolt	XBO, XBX/S		Action, Platformer	Inti Creates		
June 29	The Legend of Bum-bo	NS, PS5, XBX/S		Deck building (roguelike), Puzzle	Edmund McMillen, James Interactive, Ridiculon	Nicalis	
June 30	Comix Zone	NS		Brawler			
June 30	Cuphead: The Delicious Last Course	WIN, OSX, NS, PS4, XBO		Run and gun	Studio MDHR		
June 30	EVE ghost enemies (JP)	NS, PS4		Visual novel	El Dia		
June 30	The Galactic Junkers	WIN, NS, PS4, XBO		Action-adventure	Evil Twin Artworks	Green Man Gaming Publishing	
June 30	Ground Divers	NS		Action	Studio Tsuruhashi	Arc System Works	
June 30	Hourglass	NS, PS4, PS5, XBO, XBX/S		Puzzle-platformer	Cyberwave	Secret Item Games	
June 30	Infinity Souls (JP)	iOS, DROID		RPG	Clover Lab, Seven Arcs	Aniplex	
June 30	The Jackbox Party Starter	WIN, OSX, LIN, NS, PS4, PS5, XBO, XBX/S		Party	Jackbox Games		
June 30	Mega Man: The Wily Wars	NS		Platformer			
June 30	Monster Hunter Rise: Sunbreak	WIN, NS		Action RPG	Capcom		
June 30	Of Bird and Cage	PS4, XBO		Music	Capricia Productions	All in! Games	
June 30	Outriders Worldslayer	WIN, PS4, PS5, XBO, XBX/S, Stadia		TPS, Action RPG	People Can Fly	Square Enix	
June 30	Psikyo Shooting Stars Alpha (JP)	PS4		Shoot 'em up	Zerodiv	City Connection	
June 30	Rabbids: Party of Legends	WIN, NS, PS4, XBO, Stadia		Party	Ubisoft Chengdu	Ubisoft	
June 30	Target Earth	NS		Run and gun			
June 30	Void Terrarium 2 (JP)	NS, PS4		Roguelike, Action RPG	Nippon Ichi Software		
June 30	Zero Wing	NS		Scrolling shooter			

=== July-September ===
Release date	Title	Platform	Type	Genre	Developer	Publisher	Ref.
July 1	Archetype Arcadia (JP)	iOS, DROID		Visual novel	Water Phoenix	Kemco	
July 1	Birushana: Rising Flower of Genpei (EU)	NS		Visual novel	Idea Factory		
July 1	Centipede: Recharged	Stadia		Shoot 'em up	Sneakybox Studios	Atari	
July 1	F1 22	WIN, PS4, PS5, XBO, XBX/S		Racing	Codemasters	Electronic Arts	
July 1	Five Nights at Freddy's: Security Breach	Stadia		Survival horror	Steel Wool Games		
July 1	Gamedec	NS		Adventure, RPG	Anshar Studios	Untold Tales	
July 1	Roguebook	Stadia		Deck building (roguelike)	Abrakam Entertainment	Nacon	
July 1	Those Who Remain	Stadia		Horror	Warp Digital	Wired Productions	
July 1	Worms W.M.D	Stadia		Artillery, Strategy	Team17		
July 5	Arcadegeddon	WIN, PS4, PS5, XBO, XBX/S		TPS	IllFonic		
July 5	Yurukill: The Calumniation Games (NA)	NS, PS4, PS5		Shoot 'em up	G.rev	NIS America	
July 6	Let's Play! Oink Games	WIN		Party	Oink Games		
July 7	Dicey Dungeons	iOS, DROID		Deck building (roguelike)	Terry Cavanagh		
July 7	DJMax Respect V	XBO, XBX/S		Rhythm	Neowiz		
July 7	Far Cry 3: Blood Dragon Classic Edition	Stadia	Port	FPS	Ubisoft		
July 7	Garage: Bad Dream Adventure	WIN		PCA	Sakuba Metal Works, SmokymonkeyS	Sakuba Metal Works	
July 7	Gwent: Rogue Mage	WIN, iOS, DROID		Deck building (roguelike)	CD Projekt Red		
July 7	Klonoa Phantasy Reverie Series (JP)	WIN, NS, PS4, PS5, XBO, XBX/S		Platformer	Monkey Craft	Bandai Namco Entertainment	
July 7	Matchpoint - Tennis Championships	WIN, NS, PS4, PS5, XBO, XBX/S		Sports	Torus Games	Kalypso Media	
July 7	My Girlfriend is a Mermaid!? Refine	PS4		Visual novel	Cosen, TALESshop	Cosen	
July 7	Oita Beppu Mystery Guide: The Warped Bamboo Lantern (JP)	NS		Adventure	Happymeal	Flyhigh Works	
July 7	Ruinsmagus	WIN		Action, RPG	CharacterBank	CharacterBank, Mastiff	
July 7	Sword and Fairy Inn 2	WIN		Life sim	Softstar, CubeGame	Softstar	
July 8	AI: The Somnium Files – Nirvana Initiative (EU/OC)	WIN, NS, PS4, XBO		Adventure	Spike Chunsoft		
July 8	Klonoa Phantasy Reverie Series	WIN, NS, PS4, PS5, XBO, XBX/S		Platformer	Monkey Craft	Bandai Namco Entertainment	
July 8	Madison	WIN, PS4, PS5, XBO, XBX/S		Horror	Bloodious Games	Bloodious Games, Perp Games	
July 8	Yurukill: The Calumniation Games	EU: NS, PS4, PS5; WW: WIN		Shoot 'em up	G.rev, Esquadra, IzanagiGames	IzanagiGames	
July 12	Century: Age of Ashes	XBO		Aerial combat, TPS	Playwing		
July 12	F.I.S.T.: Forged In Shadow Torch	NS		Metroidvania	TiGames	Bilibili	
July 12	Garden Story	XBO		Action RPG	Picogram	Kowloon Nights, Rose City Games	
July 12	Hellpoint	PS5		Action RPG	Cradle Games	tinyBuild	
July 12	Krut: The Mythic Wings	WIN, OSX, NS, PS4, PS5, XBO, XBX/S		Platformer, Hack and slash	Good Job Multimedia, Pixel Perfex, RSU Horizon	Blowfish Studios	
July 12	Monument Valley 2: Panoramic Edition	WIN		Puzzle	Ustwo Games		
July 12	Monument Valley: Panoramic Edition	WIN		Puzzle	Ustwo Games		
July 12	Time on Frog Island	WIN, NS, PS4, PS5, XBO, XBX/S, Stadia		Adventure	Half Past Yellow	Merge Games	
July 12	XEL	WIN		Action-adventure	Tiny Roar	Assemble Entertainment	
July 13	Loopmancer	WIN		Roguelike	eBrain Studio		
July 13	Rune Factory 5	WIN		RPG, Simulation	Hakama	Xseed Games, Marvelous	
July 13	The Tale of Bistun	WIN, XBO		Action-adventure	Black Cube Games	IMGN.PRO	
July 14	Aim Lab	iOS, DROID		FPS, TPS	State Space Labs		
July 14	Azure Striker Gunvolt 2	XBO, XBX/S		Action, Platformer	Inti Creates		
July 14	Chickip Dancers: Norinori Dance de Kokoro mo Odoru (JP)	NS		Party	Nippon Columbia		
July 14	Escape Academy	WIN, PS4, PS5, XBO, XBX/S		Puzzle	Coin Crew Games	Iam8bit, Skybound Games	
July 14	Eyes in the Dark: The Curious Case of One Victoria Bloom	WIN		Roguelike, Platformer	Under the Stars	Gearbox Publishing	
July 14	G-Mode Archives+: Megami Tensei Gaiden: Shinyaku Last Bible	NS		RPG	G-Mode		
July 14	Mothmen 1966	WIN, OSX, NS, PS4, XBO		Visual novel	LCB Game Studio	Chorus Worldwide	
July 14	Pascal's Wager: Definitive Edition	NS		Action RPG	TipsWorks	Yooreka Studio	
July 14	PowerWash Simulator	WIN, XBO, XBX/S		Simulation	FuturLab	Square Enix Collective	
July 14	Running on Magic	NS		Platformer	Gusarapo Games	Meteorbyte Publishing	
July 14	Spidersaurs	WIN		Rhythm	WayForward		
July 14	Valiant Hearts: The Great War	Stadia		Puzzle, Adventure	Ubisoft		
July 14	Worth Life	NS		RPG	Hakama		
July 14	XEL	NS		Action-adventure	Tiny Roar	Assemble Entertainment	
July 15	Custom Robo (JP)	NS		Action RPG			
July 15	Custom Robo V2 (JP)	NS		Action RPG			
July 15	DC League of Super-Pets: The Adventures of Krypto and Ace	WIN, NS, PS4, XBO, XBX/S, Stadia		Action-adventure	PHL Collective	Outright Games	
July 15	Dreadout 2	XBO, XBX/S		Survival horror	Digital Happiness		
July 15	The Future You've Been Dreaming Of	WIN		Simulation	qureate		
July 15	House Party	WIN		Adventure	Eek! Games		
July 15	Pokémon Puzzle League	NS		Puzzle			
July 15	Running on Magic	WIN, XBO, XBX/S		Platformer	Gusarapo Games	Meteorbyte Publishing	
July 19	As Dusk Falls	WIN, XBO, XBX/S		Adventure	Interior Night	Xbox Game Studios	
July 19	Endling: Extinction is Forever	WIN, NS, PS4, XBO		Adventure, Survival	Herobeat Studios	HandyGames	
July 19	Fallen Angel	NS		Action RPG	Matrioshka Games	V Publishing	
July 19	Forza Horizon 5: Hot Wheels	WIN, XBO, XBX/S		Racing	Playground Games	Xbox Game Studios	
July 19	Into the Breach	iOS, DROID		TBS	Subset Games	Netflix	
July 19	Stray	WIN, PS4, PS5		Adventure	BlueTwelve Studio	Annapurna Interactive	
July 20	Baldur's Gate: Dark Alliance II	WIN, OSX, LIN, NS, PS4, PS5, XBO, XBX/S		Action RPG, Hack and slash	Black Isle Studios	Interplay Entertainment	
July 20	Dreadout 2	PS4, PS5		Survival horror	Digital Happiness		
July 20	Hazel Sky	WIN, NS, PS4, XBO		Adventure	Coffee Addict Game Studio	Neon Doctrine	
July 20	Kanda Alice mo Suiri Suru. (JP)	PS4		Visual novel	El Dia		
July 20	Muv-Luv Alternative Total Eclipse Remastered	WIN		Visual novel	aNCHOR		
July 20	Severed Steel	PS4, PS5		FPS	Greylock Studio	Digerati	
July 21	Bail or Jail	WIN		Action	Free Style	Konami	
July 21	Bright Memory: Infinite	NS, PS5, XBX/S		FPS, Action	FYQD-Studio	Playism	
July 21	Bunny Must Die! Chelsea and the 7 Devils	NS		Metroidvania	Platine Dispositif	Mediascape	
July 21	Coromon	NS		RPG	TRAGsoft	Freedom Games	
July 21	Daiva Story 6: Imperial of Nirsartia	NS		Platformer, Shooter			
July 21	Danganronpa S: Ultimate Summer Camp	WIN, PS4, iOS, DROID		RPG, Digital tabletop	Spike Chunsoft		
July 21	Fighter's History	NS		Fighting			
July 21	Fragment's Note+ (JP)	NS		Visual novel	Ullucus Heaven		
July 21	Hell Pie	WIN, NS, PS4, PS5, XBO, XBX/S		Action-adventure, Platformer	Shuggerfly	Headup	
July 21	Kirby's Avalanche	NS		Puzzle			
July 21	Kirby no Kirakira Kids (JP)	NS		Puzzle			
July 21	Nobunaga's Ambition: Rebirth (JP)	WIN, NS, PS4		TBS	Koei Tecmo		
July 21	River City Saga: Three Kingdoms	WIN, NS, PS4		Brawler	A+ Games	ASW America	
July 21	Severed Steel	NS		FPS	Greylock Studio	Digerati	
July 21	Summer Pockets Reflection Blue (JP)	PS4		Visual novel	Key	Prototype	
July 21	Wayward Strand	WIN, NS, PS4, PS5, XBO, XBX/S		Adventure	Ghost Pattern		
July 22	Capcom Arcade 2nd Stadium	WIN, NS, PS4, XBO		—N/a	Capcom		
July 22	Live A Live	NS		RPG	Square Enix	JP: Square Enix; WW: Nintendo	
July 22	Senses: Midnight	WIN		Survival horror	Suzaku Games	eastasiasoft	
July 22	Severed Steel	XBO, XBX/S		FPS	Greylock Studio	Digerati	
July 26	Before Your Eyes	iOS, DROID		Adventure	GoodbyeWorld Games	Netflix	
July 26	Noel the Mortal Fate	XBO		Adventure	Kawano, Vaka Game Magazine	Vaka Game Magazine	
July 26	Story of Seasons: Pioneers of Olive Town	PS4		Simulation, RPG	Marvelous Interactive	Xseed Games	
July 27	Fire Commander	WIN		RTS	Atomic Wolf	Movie Games	
July 27	Octopath Traveler: Champions of the Continent	iOS, DROID		RPG	Square Enix, Acquire	Square Enix	
July 28	Anonymous;Code (JP)	NS, PS4		Visual novel	Mages		
July 28	Azure Striker Gunvolt 3	NS		Action, Platformer	Inti Creates		
July 28	Bear and Breakfast	WIN		Life sim	Gummy Cat	Armor Games Studios	
July 28	Captain Velvet Meteor: The Jump+ Dimensions	NS		Action RPG	Shueisha		
July 28	Digimon Survive (JP)	NS, PS4		Visual novel, Tactical RPG	Hyde	Bandai Namco Entertainment	
July 28	Dungeon Munchies	WIN, OSX, NS		Action RPG	Majaja	Chorus Worldwide	
July 28	The Forgotten City	Stadia		Adventure	Modern Storyteller	Plug In Digital	
July 28	GrimGrimoire OnceMore (JP)	NS, PS4		RTS	Vanillaware	Nippon Ichi Software	
July 28	HajiLove: Making Lovers (JP)	NS, PS4		Visual novel	SMEE	Entergram	
July 28	Himemiya-san wa Kamaitai (JP)	PS4		Visual novel	Prekano	Entergram	
July 28	Hohokum	WIN		Art	Honeyslug	Annapurna Interactive	
July 28	Koumajou Remilia: Scarlet Symphony	WIN, NS		Action	Frontier Aja	CFK	
July 28	Lost Epic	WIN, PS4, PS5		Action RPG	Team Earth Wars	One or Eight	
July 28	Psikyo Shooting Stars Bravo (JP)	PS4		Shoot 'em up	Zerodiv	City Connection	
July 28	Re:LieF ~Dear You~ FoR SwitcH (JP)	NS		Visual novel	RASK		
July 28	Sen no Hatou, Tsukisome no Kouki (JP)	NS		Visual novel	August	Entergram	
July 28	Strange Horticulture	NS		Puzzle	Bad Viking	Iceberg Interactive	
July 28	Transiruby	PS4		Metroidvania	Skipmore, Esquadra	Flyhigh Works	
July 28	Vestaria Saga II: The Sacred Sword of Silvanister	WIN		Tactical RPG	Vestaria Project	Dangen Entertainment	
July 28	What Remains of Edith Finch	PS5, XBX/S		Adventure	Giant Sparrow	Annapurna Interactive	
July 28	Yuoni	NS		Survival horror	Tricore Inc.	Chorus Worldwide	
July 29	Avenging Spirit	NS, PS4, PS5, XBO, XBX/S		Platformer	Shinyuden, City Connection	Ratalaika Games	
July 29	Digimon Survive	WIN, NS, PS4, XBO		Survival, Tactical RPG	Hyde	Bandai Namco Entertainment	
July 29	Madison	NS		Horror	Bloodious Games	Perp Games	
July 29	RimWorld Console Edition	PS4, XBO		Action RPG	Double Eleven		
July 29	Story of Seasons: Pioneers of Olive Town (EU)	PS4		Simulation, RPG	Marvelous Interactive	Xseed Games	
July 29	Turrican Anthology Vol. 1 & 2	NS, PS4		Run and gun	Factor 5	ININ Games	
July 29	Xenoblade Chronicles 3	NS		Action RPG	Monolith Soft	Nintendo	
July 31	Beat Refle	WIN		Rhythm	qureate		
August 1	Hellpoint	XBX/S		Action RPG	Cradle Games	tinyBuild	
August 2	Azure Striker Gunvolt 3	XBO, XBX/S		Action, Platformer	Inti Creates		
August 2	Frogun	WIN, LIN, NS, PS4, PS5, XBO, XBX/S		Platformer	Molegato	Top Hat Studio	
August 2	Monster Boy and the Cursed Kingdom	XBX/S		Metroidvania, Platformer	Game Atelier	FDG Entertainment	
August 3	Hooked on You: A Dead by Daylight Dating Sim	WIN		Dating sim	Behaviour Interactive	Behaviour Interactive	
August 3	Mega Man Battle & Fighters	NS		Fighting	SNK		
August 3	South of the Circle	WIN, NS, PS4, PS5, XBO, XBX/S		Adventure	State of Play Games	11 bit studios	
August 4	Apathy: Narugami Gakuen Nana Fushigi (JP)	NS		Visual novel	Mebius, Shannon	Mebius	
August 4	Descenders	iOS, DROID		Sports	Noodlecake Studios		
August 4	Fullmetal Alchemist Mobile (JP)	iOS, DROID		Tactical RPG	Square Enix		
August 4	Gesshizu: Minna de Chokomaka Muradukuri (JP)	NS		Life sim	Nippon Columbia		
August 4	Hard West II	WIN		TBT	Ice Code Games	Good Shepherd Entertainment	
August 4	Hindsight	WIN, OSX, NS, iOS		Adventure	Team Hindsight	Annapurna Interactive	
August 4	Kokoro Clover Season 1	WIN, NS		Platformer	Hikotel	Phoenixx, Gotcha Gotcha Games	
August 4	Picross X: Picbits vs. Uzboross (JP)	NS		Puzzle	Jupiter		
August 4	Sword and Fairy: Together Forever	PS4, PS5		Action RPG	Softstar	eastasiasoft	
August 4	Vanaris Tactics	WIN		Tactical RPG	Matheus Reis	Toge Productions	
August 5	Amazing Bomberman	iOS		Rhythm, Action	Konami		
August 5	Bokura	WIN, iOS, DROID		Adventure, Puzzle	Tokoronyori	Kodansha	
August 5	Burrow of the Fallen Bear	WIN		Visual novel	Male Doll		
August 5	GigaBash	WIN, PS4, PS5		Fighting	Passion Republic Games		
August 5	Papers, Please	iOS, DROID		Puzzle, Simulation	3909		
August 6	The 13th Month	WIN, iOS, DROID		Visual novel	Kobayashimaru	Kodansha	
August 8	Oita Beppu Mystery Guide: The Warped Bamboo Lantern (JP)	WIN		Adventure	Happymeal	Flyhigh Works	
August 8	Tyrant's Blessing	WIN, OSX, LIN, NS		TBT	Mercury Game Studio	Freedom Games	
August 9	Axiom Verge 2	PS5		Metroidvania	Thomas Happ Games		
August 9	Timothy and the Tower of Mu	WIN		Action, Platformer	Kibou Entertainment	Playism	
August 9	Two Point Campus	WIN, OSX, LIN, NS, PS4, PS5, XBO, XBX/S		Business sim	Two Point Studios	Sega	
August 10	Heaven Burns Red (JP)	WIN		RPG	Key, WFS		
August 10	Lost in Play	WIN, NS, iOS, OSX		PCA, Puzzle	Happy Juice Games	Joystick Ventures, Snapbreak Games	
August 10	Tower of Fantasy	WIN, iOS, DROID		RPG	Hotta Studio	Level Infinite	
August 11	Arcade Paradise	WIN, NS, PS4, PS5, XBO, XBX/S		Adventure	Nosebleed Interactive	Wired Productions	
August 11	Axiom Verge 2	LIN		Metroidvania	Thomas Happ Games		
August 11	Cult of the Lamb	WIN, OSX, NS, PS4, PS5, XBO, XBX/S		Roguelike, CMS	Massive Monster	Devolver Digital	
August 11	Rumbleverse	WIN, PS4, PS5, XBO, XBX/S		Brawler, Battle royale	Iron Galaxy	Epic Games	
August 11	Shin-chan: Me and the Professor on Summer Vacation – The Endless Seven-Day Journey	NS		Adventure	Millennium Kitchen	Neos	
August 11	Undernauts: Labyrinth of Yomi	PS5		RPG, Dungeon crawl	Experience	Aksys Games	
August 12	Marvel's Spider-Man Remastered	WIN	Port	Action-adventure	Nixxes Software	PlayStation PC	
August 12	Super Bullet Break	WIN, OSX, NS, PS4		Deck building (roguelike)	BeXide	PQube	
August 14	Spark the Electric Jester 3	WIN		Action, Platformer	Feperd Games		
August 15	Fashion Police Squad	WIN		FPS	Mopeful Games	No More Robots	
August 16	Blossom Tales II: The Minotaur Prince	WIN, LIN, NS		Adventure, RPG	Castle Pixel	Playtonic Friends	
August 16	Rollerdrome	WIN, PS4, PS5		Action, TPS	Roll7	Private Division	
August 16	Tribes of Midgard	NS, XBO, XBX/S		Action RPG, Survival	Norsfell Games	Gearbox Publishing	
August 16	Way of the Hunter	WIN, PS5, XBX/S		Simulation	Nine Rocks Games	THQ Nordic	
August 17	Kirby's Dream Buffet	NS		Battle royale, Platformer	HAL Laboratory	Nintendo	
August 17	Little League World Series Baseball 2022	WIN, NS, PS4, PS5, XBO, XBX/S		Sports	IguanaBee	GameMill Entertainment	
August 18	Automatoys	iOS, DROID		Puzzle	Idle Friday		
August 18	Cursed to Golf	WIN, NS, PS4, PS5, XBO, XBX/S		Roguelike, Adventure, Sports	Chuhai Labs	Thunderful Games	
August 18	Quake Champions	WIN		FPS	id Software	Bethesda Softworks	
August 18	RPG Time: The Legend of Wright	NS, PS4		Adventure, RPG	DeskWorks!	Aniplex	
August 18	Scar of the Doll (JP)	NS		Visual novel	Mamekujira, Mista Stories		
August 18	Slaycation Paradise	WIN, NS, PS4, PS5, XBO, XBX/S		Shoot 'em up, Tower defense	Affordable Acquisition	Merge Games	
August 18	Thymesia	WIN, NS, PS5, XBX/S		Action RPG	OverBorder Studio	Team17	
August 18	We Are OFK	WIN, OSX, NS, PS4, PS5		Graphic adventure	Team OFK		
August 19	Cloudpunk	PS5		Adventure	Ion Lands	Merge Games	
August 19	Jetpack Joyride 2	iOS		Endless runner	Halfbrick Studios		
August 19	Lair Land Story	WIN, NS		Social sim	Circle Entertainment	PQube	
August 19	Madden NFL 23	WIN, PS4, PS5, XBO, XBX/S		Sports	EA Tiburon	Electronic Arts	
August 19	A Tale of Paper: Refolded	WIN, XBO, XBX/S		Puzzle-platformer	Open House Games	Digerati	
August 19	Wave Race 64	NS		Racing			
August 21	Tribal Hunter	WIN		Platformer, Action-adventure	Melonsoda Soft		
August 23	Are You Smarter Than a Fifth Grader?	WIN, NS, PS4, PS5, XBO, XBX/S		Party	Massive Miniteam	HandyGames	
August 23	Fallen Legion Revenants (NA)	WIN, PS5, XBO, XBX/S		Action RPG	YummyYummyTummy	NIS America	
August 23	Fallen Legion: Rise to Glory (NA)	WIN, PS5, XBO, XBX/S		Action RPG	YummyYummyTummy	NIS America	
August 23	Midnight Fight Express	WIN, NS, PS4, XBO		Action, Brawler	Jacob Dzwinel	Humble Games	
August 23	Saints Row	WIN, PS4, PS5, XBO, XBX/S, Stadia	Original	Action-adventure	Volition	Deep Silver	
August 23	Yars: Recharged	WIN, OSX, LIN, NS, PS4, PS5, XBO, XBX/S, Stadia, ATRVCS		Shoot 'em up	Adamvision Studios, SneakyBox	Atari	
August 24	Islets	WIN, NS, XBO, XBX/S		Action-adventure	Kyle Thompson	Armor Games Studios	
August 25	Alice's Warped Wonderland: REcollection	NS		Horror, Visual novel	Nightmare Studio		
August 25	The Bridge Curse: Road to Salvation	WIN		Horror	Softstar Entertainment		
August 25	Earth Defense Force 6 (JP)	PS4, PS5		TPS	Sandlot	D3 Publisher	
August 25	Haak	WIN, NS		Action, Platformer	Blingame	Lightning Games	
August 25	I Was a Teenage Exocolonist	WIN, OSX, LIN, NS, PS4, PS5		Deck building, RPG	Northway Games	Finji	
August 25	Idol Manager	NS, PS4, PS5		Life sim	Glitch Pitch	Playism	
August 25	Miss Kobayashi's Dragon Maid: Sakuretsu!! Chorogon Breath	NS, PS4		Shoot 'em up	Bushiroad		
August 25	Monster Outbreak	WIN, OSX, LIN, NS		Survival	GameMunchers	Freedom Games	
August 25	Opus: Echo of Starsong - Full Bloom Edition	XBO, XBX/S		Adventure	Sigono		
August 25	SD Gundam Battle Alliance	WIN, NS, PS4, PS5, XBO, XBX/S		Action RPG	Artdink	Bandai Namco Entertainment	
August 25	Shin-chan: Me and the Professor on Summer Vacation – The Endless Seven-Day Journey	PS4		Adventure	Millennium Kitchen	Neos	
August 25	Soul Hackers 2 (JP)	WIN, PS4, PS5, XBO, XBX/S		RPG	Atlus		
August 26	Brok the InvestiGator	WIN		PCA, Brawler	Cowcat Games		
August 26	The Company Man	PS4, PS5, XBO, XBX/S		Action-adventure	Forust	Leoful	
August 26	Fallen Legion Revenants (EU)	WIN, PS5, XBO, XBX/S		Action RPG	YummyYummyTummy	NIS America	
August 26	Fallen Legion: Rise to Glory (EU)	WIN, PS5, XBO, XBX/S		Action RPG	YummyYummyTummy	NIS America	
August 26	Nexomon + Nexomon: Extinction: Complete Collection	NS, PS4, XBO		RPG	VEWO Interactive	PQube	·
August 26	Pac-Man World Re-Pac	WIN, NS, PS4, PS5, XBO, XBX/S		Platformer	Now Production	Bandai Namco Entertainment	
August 26	Soul Hackers 2	WIN, PS4, PS5, XBO, XBX/S		RPG	Atlus		
August 30	Commandos 3 - HD Remaster	WIN, NS, PS4, XBO		RTS	Raylight Games	Kalypso Media	
August 30	Destroy All Humans! 2: Reprobed	WIN, PS5, XBX/S		Action-adventure	Black Forest Games	THQ Nordic	
August 30	Dusk Diver 2	NS, PS4, PS5		Action RPG, Hack and slash	WANIN Games	Idea Factory	
August 30	F1 Manager 2022	WIN, PS4, PS5, XBO, XBX/S		Business sim	Frontier Developments		
August 30	Immortality	WIN, OSX, XBX/S, iOS, DROID		Interactive film	Sam Barlow	Half Mermaid Productions	
August 30	Inscryption	PS4, PS5		Deck building (roguelike)	Daniel Mullins Games	Devolver Digital	
August 30	Prinny Presents NIS Classics Volume 3 (NA)	WIN, NS		Tactical RPG	Nippon Ichi Software		
August 30	Teenage Mutant Ninja Turtles: The Cowabunga Collection	WIN, NS, PS4, PS5, XBO, XBX/S		—N/a	Digital Eclipse	Konami	
August 30	Tinykin	WIN, NS, PS4, PS5, XBO, XBX/S		Puzzle, Adventure	Splashteam	tinyBuild	
August 30	Zero Escape: Zero Time Dilemma	XBO		Adventure	Chime	Spike Chunsoft	
August 31	Call of the Wild: The Angler	WIN		Simulation	Expansive Worlds		
August 31	Phantasy Star Online 2	PS4		Action RPG, MMO, RPG	Sega Online R&D	Sega	
August 31	Phantasy Star Online 2: New Genesis	PS4		Action RPG, MMO, RPG	Sega Online R&D	Sega	
August 31	Scathe	WIN		FPS, Bullet hell	Damage State	Kwalee	
August 31	Shin-chan: Me and the Professor on Summer Vacation – The Endless Seven-Day Journey	WIN		Adventure	Millennium Kitchen	Neos	
September 1	ANNO: Mutationem	NS		Action RPG	ThinkingStars	Lightning Games	
September 1	Chenso Club	WIN, NS, PS4, XBO		Roguelike, Brawler	Pixadome	Curve Games	
September 1	Gerda: A Flame in Winter	WIN, NS		Adventure	PortaPlay	Dontnod Entertainment	
September 1	Made in Abyss: Binary Star Falling into Darkness (JP)	WIN, NS, PS4		Action RPG	Chime Corporation	Spike Chunsoft	
September 1	Ooblets	WIN, NS, XBO		Life sim	Glumberland		
September 2	JoJo's Bizarre Adventure: All Star Battle R	WIN, NS, PS4, PS5, XBO, XBX/S		Fighting	CyberConnect2	Bandai Namco Entertainment	
September 2	The Last of Us Part I	PS5	Remake	Action-adventure	Naughty Dog	Sony Interactive Entertainment	
September 2	Lego Brawls	WIN, NS, PS4, PS5, XBO, XBX/S		Fighting	RED Games	Bandai Namco Entertainment	
September 2	Lunistice	WIN, NS		Platformer	A Grumpy Fox	Deck13	
September 2	Made in Abyss: Binary Star Falling into Darkness	WIN, NS, PS4		Action RPG	Chime Corporation	Spike Chunsoft	
September 2	Prinny Presents NIS Classics Volume 3 (EU)	WIN, NS		Tactical RPG	Nippon Ichi Software		
September 6	Biomutant	PS5, XBX/S		Action RPG	Experiment 101	THQ Nordic	
September 6	Circus Electrique	WIN, NS, PS4, PS5, XBO, XBX/S		Tactical RPG	Zen Studios	Saber Interactive	
September 6	Horizon Chase 2	iOS		Racing	Aquiris		
September 6	Railbound	WIN, OSX, iOS, DROID		Puzzle	Afterburn		
September 6	Re:Legend	WIN		RPG	Magnus Games Studio	505 Games	
September 6	Temtem	WIN, NS, PS5, XBX/S		MMO, RPG	Crema	Humble Bundle	
September 6	The Tomorrow Children: Phoenix Edition	PS4		Action	Q-Games		
September 6	Train Sim World 3	WIN, PS4, PS5, XBO, XBX/S		Simulation	Dovetail Games		
September 8	Adventure Academia: The Fractured Continent	JP: NS, PS4; WW: WIN		Tactical RPG	Acquire		
September 8	Alice Gear Aegis CS: Concerto of Simulatrix (JP)	NS, PS4, PS5		Action	Pyramid	Mages	
September 8	BPM: Bullets Per Minute	NS		FPS, Rhythm, Roguelike	Awe Interactive	Playtonic Friends	
September 8	The Fox Awaits Me	PS4		Visual novel	Cosen, TALESshop	Cosen	
September 8	Jack Move	WIN		RPG	So Romantic	HypeTrain Digital	
September 8	Justice Sucks	WIN, NS, PS4, XBO		Action, Stealth	Samurai Punk	tinyBuild	
September 8	Lucky Luna	iOS, DROID		Platformer	Snowman	Netflix Games	
September 8	Steelrising	WIN, PS5, XBX/S		Action RPG, Soulslike	Spiders	Nacon	
September 8	Tower Princess	WIN, NS, PS4		Roguelike, Platformer	Awekteam	HypeTrain Digital	
September 8	White Day: A Labyrinth Named School	NS, PS5, XBX/S		Survival horror	Sonnori	PQube	
September 9	NBA 2K23	WIN, NS, PS4, PS5, XBO, XBX/S		Sports	Visual Concepts	2K Sports	
September 9	Oita Beppu Mystery Guide: The Warped Bamboo Lantern (JP)	PS4		Adventure	Happymeal	Flyhigh Works	
September 9	Splatoon 3	NS		TPS	Nintendo EPD	Nintendo	
September 12	Roadwarden	WIN, OSX, LIN		RPG, Interactive fiction	Moral Anxiety Studio	Assemble Entertainment	
September 13	Freedom Planet 2	WIN		Platformer	GalaxyTrail		
September 13	Isonzo	WIN, PS4, PS5, XBO, XBX/S		FPS	Blackmill Games, M2H	M2H	
September 13	Little Orpheus	WIN, NS, PS4, PS5, XBO, XBX/S		Adventure	The Chinese Room	Secret Mode	
September 13	Radiant Silvergun	NS		Shoot 'em up	Treasure	Live Wire	
September 13	SCP: Secret Files	WIN		Action-adventure	GameZoo Studio	Pixmain	
September 13	Sunday Gold	WIN		RPG, Adventure	BKOM Studios	Team17	
September 13	Voice of Cards: The Beasts of Burden	WIN, NS, PS4		RPG	Alim	Square Enix	
September 13	XIII	NS		FPS, Stealth	Tower Five	Microids	
September 15	Alisia Dragoon	NS		Platformer			
September 15	Bear and Breakfast	NS		Life sim	Gummy Cat	Armor Games Studios	
September 15	Beyond Oasis	NS		Action-adventure			
September 15	Blind Fate: Edo No Yami	WIN, NS, PS4, PS5, XBO, XBX/S		Action-adventure	Troglobyte Games	101XP	
September 15	Despot's Game	WIN, OSX, LIN, NS, PS4, PS5, XBO, XBX/S		Roguelike, Auto battler	Konfa Games	tinyBuild	
September 15	Dragon Quest X Offline (JP)	WIN, NS, PS4, PS5		MMO, RPG	B.B. Studio	Square Enix	
September 15	Dungeons 3	NS		Strategy, Simulation	Realmforge Studios	Kalypso Media	
September 15	Earthworm Jim	NS		Platformer, Run and gun			
September 15	Fairy Fencer F: Refrain Chord (JP)	NS, PS4, PS5		Tactical RPG	Sting	Compile Heart	
September 15	Fault - StP - Lightkravte	NS		Visual novel	Alice in Dissonance	Phoenixx	
September 15	Foretales	WIN, NS		Deck building	Alkemi	Dear Villagers	
September 15	Metal: Hellsinger	WIN, PS5, XBX/S		FPS, Rhythm	The Outsiders	Funcom	
September 15	Outer Wilds	PS5, XBX/S		Action-adventure	Mobius Digital	Annapurna Interactive	
September 15	SBK 22	WIN, PS4, PS5, XBO, XBX/S		Racing	Milestone		
September 15	Trinity Trigger (JP)	NS, PS4, PS5		Action RPG	Three Rings	FuRyu	
September 15	Trombone Champ	WIN		Music, Rhythm	Holy Wow Studios		
September 19	Return to Monkey Island	WIN, NS		Adventure	Terrible Toybox, Lucasfilm Games	Devolver Digital	
September 19	There is No Light	WIN		Action-adventure	Zelart	HypeTrain Digital	
September 20	Amnesia: Later×Crowd	NS		Visual novel	Idea Factory		
September 20	Amnesia: Memories	NS		Visual novel	Idea Factory		
September 20	Construction Simulator	WIN, PS4, PS5, XBO, XBX/S		Simulation	weltenbauer	Astragon	
September 20	Deathloop	XBX/S		FPS	Arkane Studios	Bethesda Softworks	
September 20	Hardspace: Shipbreaker	PS5, XBX/S		Simulation	Blackbird Interactive	Focus Entertainment	
September 20	Jack Move	NS, PS4, XBO		RPG	So Romantic	HypeTrain Digital	
September 20	Soulstice	WIN, PS5, XBX/S		Action, Hack and slash	Reply Game Studios	Modus Games	
September 20	Wylde Flowers	WIN, NS		Farming	Studio Drydock		
September 21	Gundam Evolution	WIN		FPS	Bandai Namco Studios	Bandai Namco Entertainment	
September 21	The Outbound Ghost	WIN		Adventure, RPG	Conradical Games	Digerati	
September 22	Beacon Pines	WIN, NS, XBO		Narrative adventure	Hiding Spot Games	Fellow Traveller	
September 22	Bullet Soul Double Pack (JP)	NS		Shoot 'em up	Tachyon	Mages	
September 22	The Diofield Chronicle	WIN, NS, PS4, PS5, XBO, XBX/S		Tactical RPG	Square Enix, Lancarse	Square Enix	
September 22	Jyuzaengi: Engetsu Sangokuden 1&2 (JP)	NS		Visual novel	Otomate	Idea Factory	
September 22	My Teen Romantic Comedy SNAFU Game Collection (JP)	NS		Visual novel	Mages		
September 22	No Place for Bravery	WIN, NS		Action RPG	Glitch Factory	Ysbyrd Games	
September 22	OneShot: World Machine Edition	NS, PS4, XBO		Adventure, Puzzle	Future Cat	Degica	
September 22	Piofiore: Episodio 1926	NS		Visual novel	Design Factory	Aksys Games	
September 22	Potion Permit	WIN, NS, PS4, PS5, XBO, XBX/S		Simulation, RPG	MassHive Media	PQube	
September 22	River City Girls Zero	WIN, PS4, PS5, XBO, XBX/S		Brawler	WayForward	Arc System Works	
September 22	Serial Cleaners	WIN, NS, PS4, PS5, XBO, XBX/S		Action, Stealth	Draw Distance	505 Games	
September 22	Session: Skate Sim	WIN, PS4, PS5, XBO, XBX/S		Sports	Crea-ture Studios	Nacon	
September 22	Valis: The Fantasm Soldier Collection II (JP)	NS		Platformer, Visual novel	El Dia		
September 23	DreamWorks Dragons: Legends of the Nine Realms	WIN, NS, PS4, PS5, XBO, XBX/S, Stadia		Adventure	A Heartful of Games	Outright Games	
September 23	Prodeus	WIN, OSX, NS, PS4, PS5, XBO, XBX/S		FPS	Bounding Box Software	Humble Games	
September 23	Shovel Knight Dig	WIN, NS, iOS		Action-adventure	Nitrome	Yacht Club Games	
September 23	Taiko no Tatsujin: Rhythm Festival	NS		Rhythm	Bandai Namco Studios	Bandai Namco Entertainment	
September 26	Outcore: Desktop Adventure	WIN		Adventure			
September 26	The Spirit and the Mouse	WIN, NS		Adventure	Alblune	Armor Games Studios	
September 27	Alfred Hitchcock – Vertigo (EU)	NS, PS4, PS5, XBO, XBX/S,		Adventure	Pendulo Studios	Microids	
September 27	Black Witchcraft	WIN		Action RPG	Quattro Gear	Crest	
September 27	Desta: The Memories Between	iOS, DROID		TBS, Roguelike	Ustwo	Netflix	
September 27	Dome Keeper	WIN, OSX, LIN		Tower defense, Roguelike	Bippinbits	Raw Fury	
September 27	Dual Universe	WIN		MMO, RPG, Sandbox	Novaquark		
September 27	Grounded	WIN, XBO, XBX/S		Survival	Obsidian Entertainment	Xbox Game Studios	
September 27	Hokko Life	WIN, NS, PS4, XBO		Social sim	Wonderscope Games	Team17	
September 27	The Legend of Heroes: Trails from Zero	WIN, NS, PS4		RPG	Nihon Falcom	NIS America	
September 27	Life Is Strange: Arcadia Bay Collection	NS		Adventure	Don't Nod, Deck Nine	Square Enix	
September 27	Moonscars	WIN, NS, PS4, PS5, XBO, XBX/S		Action, Platformer	Black Mermaid	Humble Games	
September 27	Tunic	NS, PS4, PS5		Action-adventure	Andrew Shouldice	Finji	
September 28	Deathverse: Let It Die	PS4, PS5		Action, Survival	Supertrick Games	GungHo Online Entertainment	
September 28	Foxhole	WIN		MMO, RPG, Sandbox	Siege Camp		
September 28	NeverAwake	WIN		Shoot 'em up	Neotro	Phoenixx	
September 28	Road Redemption Mobile	iOS, DROID		Vehicular combat, Racing	Pixel Dash Studios	Tripwire Interactive	
September 29	Bonelab	WIN, Quest		FPS	Stress Level Zero		
September 29	Brewmaster: Beer Brewing Simulator	WIN		Simulation	Auroch Digital	Fireshine Games	
September 29	Bullet Soul	NS		Shoot 'em up	Tachyon	Mages	
September 29	Bullet Soul: Infinite Burst	NS		Shoot 'em up	Tachyon	Mages	
September 29	Desta: The Memories Between	iOS		TBS	Ustwo Games	Netflix	
September 29	Dorfromantik	NS		Puzzle, City builder	Toukana Interactive		
September 29	Harvest OverRay + Ano Ko wa Ore kara Hanarenai (JP)	NS, PS4		Visual novel	Giga	Entergram	
September 29	KonoSuba: God's Blessing on this Wonderful World! Cursed Relic and the Perplexed Adventurers (JP)	NS, PS4		RPG	Entergram		
September 29	La Campanella della Eterno (JP)	NS		Visual novel	Windmill Oasis	Ares	
September 29	Labyrinth of Zangetsu (JP)	WIN, NS, PS4		RPG	KaeruPanda	Acquire	
September 29	The Legend of Heroes: Kuro no Kiseki II -CRIMSON SiN- (JP)	PS4, PS5		RPG	Nihon Falcom		
September 29	Little Witch Nobeta	WIN, NS, PS4		Soulslike	Pupuya Games, SimonCreative	Justdan International	
September 29	New Prince of Tennis LET'S GO!! ~Daily Life~ from RisingBeat (JP)	NS		Visual novel	HuneX	Bushiroad	
September 29	Pathfinder: Wrath of the Righteous	NS, PS4, XBO		RPG	Owlcat Games	Prime Matter	
September 29	Post Void	NS, PS4, PS5		FPS, Roguelike	YCJY Games	Super Rare Originals	
September 29	Railgrade	WIN, NS		Vehicle sim (train), Strategy	Minakata Dynamics	Epic Games	
September 29	Sam & Max Beyond Time and Space Remastered	PS4		Graphic adventure	Skunkape Games		
September 29	Sam & Max Save the World Remastered	PS4		Graphic adventure	Skunkape Games		
September 29	Sword Art Online: Alicization Lycoris (JP)	NS		Action RPG	Aquria	Bandai Namco Entertainment	
September 29	Touhou Shoujo: Tale of Beautiful Memories	NS		Action RPG	The N Main Shop	Mediascape	
September 29	Valkyrie Elysium	PS4, PS5		Action RPG	Soleil	Square Enix	
September 29	Let's Build a Zoo	NS		CMS			
September 30	Airoheart	WIN, NS, PS4, PS5, XBO, XBX/S		Action-adventure, RPG	Pixel Heart Studio	Soedesco	
September 30	Blade Assault	NS, PS4, PS5, XBO, XBX/S		Action, Roguelike, Platformer	Team Suneat	PM Studios	
September 30	Bunny Park	NS, PS4, PS5, XBO, XBX/S		CMS	Cozy Bee Games	Soedesco	
September 30	FIFA 23	WIN, NS, PS4, PS5, XBO, XBX/S, Stadia		Sports	EA Vancouver, EA Romania	EA Sports	
September 30	Lemon Cake	NS, PS4, PS5, XBO, XBX/S		CMS	Cozy Bee Games	Soedesco	
September 30	My Little Pony: A Maretime Bay Adventure	PS5, XBX/S		Adventure	Bandai Namco Studios	Outright Games	
September 30	Paw Patrol: Grand Prix	WIN, NS, PS4, PS5, XBO, XBX/S, Stadia		Racing	3D Clouds	Outright Games	
September 30	Stella of the End	WIN		Visual novel	Key	Visual Arts	
September 30	Sword Art Online: Alicization Lycoris	NS		Action RPG	Aquria	Bandai Namco Entertainment	

=== October-December ===
Release date	Title	Platform	Type	Genre	Developer	Publisher	Ref.
October 4	Alfred Hitchcock – Vertigo (NA)	NS, PS4, PS5, XBO, XBX/S		Adventure	Pendulo Studios	Microids	
October 4	Dakar Desert Rally	WIN, PS4, PS5, XBO, XBX/S		Racing	Saber Interactive		
October 5	Deathverse: Let It Die	WIN		Action, Survival	Supertrick Games	GungHo Online Entertainment	
October 6	Nier: Automata The End of Yorha Edition	NS		Action RPG	Virtuos	Square Enix	
October 6	No More Heroes III (JP)	PS4, PS5, XBO, XBX/S		Action-adventure, Hack and slash	Grasshopper Manufacture	Xseed Games	
October 6	Touch Detective: Rina and the Funghi Case Files (JP)	NS		Adventure	BeeWorks	Success Corporation	
October 7	Chaos;Head Noah	WIN		Visual novel	Mages	Spike Chunsoft	
October 7	Chaos;Head Noah / Chaos;Child Double Pack	NS		Visual novel	Mages	Spike Chunsoft	
October 7	L.O.L. Surprise! B.B's Born To Travel	WIN, NS, PS4, PS5, XBO, XBX/S, Stadia		Action	Xaloc Studios	Outright Games	
October 7	No Man's Sky	NS		Action-adventure, Survival	Hello Games		
October 11	Asterigos: Curse of the Stars	WIN, PS4, PS5, XBO, XBX/S		Action-adventure	Acme Game Studio	tinyBuild	
October 11	Kamiwaza: Way of the Thief (NA)	WIN, NS, PS4		Stealth, Action	Acquire	NIS America	
October 11	No More Heroes III (NA)	WIN, PS4, PS5, XBO, XBX/S		Action-adventure, Hack and slash	Grasshopper Manufacture	Xseed Games	
October 12	Lego Bricktales	WIN, NS, PS4, PS5, XBO, XBX/S		Puzzle, Adventure	ClockStone Studio	Thunderful	
October 12	PC Building Simulator 2	WIN		Business sim	Spiral House	Epic Games Publishing	
October 12	Undecember	WIN, iOS, DROID		Action RPG	Needs Games	Line Games Corporation	
October 13	Asterix & Obelix XXXL: The Ram From Hibernia	WIN, NS, PS4, PS5, XBX/S		Action-adventure, Brawler	OSome Studio	Microids	
October 13	Astlibra Revision	WIN		Action RPG	KEIZO	WhisperGames	
October 13	Azure Striker Gunvolt 3	WIN		Action, Platformer	Inti Creates		
October 13	Bus Simulator City Ride	NS, iOS, DROID		Simulation	Still Alive Studios	astragon	
October 13	The Case of the Golden Idol	WIN, OSX, LIN		Puzzle, Adventure	Color Gray Games	Playstack	
October 13	Cultic	WIN	Original	Horror, FPS	Jasozz Games	3D Realms	
October 13	The Darkest Tales	WIN, NS, XBO		Platformer, Action-adventure	Trinity Team	101XP	
October 13	Dragon Ball: The Breakers (JP)	WIN, NS, PS4, XBO		Action, Survival	Dimps	Bandai Namco Entertainment	
October 13	The Eternal Cylinder	PS5, XBX/S		Adventure, Survival	ACE Team	Good Shepherd Entertainment	
October 13	Fragment's Note+	NS		Visual novel	Ullucus Heaven		
October 13	The Last Oricru	WIN, PS5, XBX/S		Action RPG	GoldKnights	Prime Matter	
October 13	Lost Eidolons	WIN		Tactical RPG	Ocean Drive Studio		
October 13	Pilotwings 64	NS		Vehicle sim (plane)			
October 13	Triangle Strategy	WIN		Tactical RPG	Artdink	Square Enix	
October 13	Trifox	NS		Action-adventure	Glowfish Interactive	Big Sugar	
October 13	The Witch's House MV	NS, PS4, XBO		Horror, RPG	Fummy	Dangen Entertainment	
October 14	Dragon Ball: The Breakers	WIN, NS, PS4, XBO		Action, Survival	Dimps	Bandai Namco Entertainment	
October 14	Kamiwaza: Way of the Thief (EU)	WIN, NS, PS4		Stealth, Action	Acquire	NIS America	
October 14	McPixel 3	WIN, OSX, LIN, NS, XBX/S		Adventure, Puzzle	Sos Sosowski	Devolver Digital	
October 14	NHL 23	PS4, PS5, XBO, XBX/S		Sports	EA Vancouver	Electronic Arts	
October 14	Nickelodeon Kart Racers 3: Slime Speedway	WIN, NS, PS4, PS5, XBO, XBX/S		Racing	Bamtang Games	Gamemill Entertainment	
October 14	No More Heroes III (EU)	PS4, PS5, XBO, XBX/S		Action-adventure, Hack and slash	Grasshopper Manufacture	Marvelous Europe	
October 14	PGA Tour 2K23	WIN, PS4, PS5, XBO, XBX/S		Sports	HB Studios	2K	
October 14	Saint Kotar	NS, PS4, PS5, XBO, XBX/S		Horror, Adventure	Red Martyr Studio	Soedesco	
October 14	Scorn	WIN, PS5, XBX/S		Survival horror, Adventure	Ebb Software		
October 14	Star Trek Prodigy: Supernova	WIN, PS4, PS5, XBO, XBX/S, NS		Action-adventure	Tessera Studios	Outright Games	
October 14	Trifox	WIN, XBO, XBX/S		Action-adventure	Glowfish Interactive	Big Sugar	
October 15	Figment 2: Creed Valley	WIN, NS		Action-adventure	Bedtime Digital Games		
October 18	Ghostbusters: Spirits Unleashed	WIN, PS4, PS5, XBO, XBX/S		Action	IllFonic		
October 18	Marvel Snap	WIN, iOS, DROID		DCCG	Second Dinner	Nuverse	
October 18	A Plague Tale: Requiem	WIN, NS, PS5, XBX/S		Action-adventure, Stealth	Asobo Studio	Focus Entertainment	
October 18	Them's Fightin' Herds	NS, PS4, PS5, XBO, XBX/S		Fighting	Mane6	Modus Games	
October 19	The Last Hero of Nostalgaia	WIN, XBO, XBX/S		Action-adventure	Over the Moon	PQube	
October 19	The Last Worker	WIN		Adventure	Wolf & Wood, Oiffy	Wired Productions	
October 19	Uncharted: Legacy of Thieves Collection	WIN		Action-adventure	Naughty Dog	PlayStation PC	
October 19	The Valiant	WIN		RTS	Kite Games	THQ Nordic	
October 20	Alan Wake Remastered	NS	Remaster	Action-adventure	Remedy Entertainment	Epic Games Publishing	
October 20	Batora: Lost Haven	WIN, PS4, PS5, XBO, XBX/S		Action-adventure	Stormind Games	Team17	
October 20	Dolphin Wave (JP)	iOS, DROID, WIN		TBS	Barrett, Honey∞Parade Games	Marvelous	
October 20	Dragon Quest X Online All In One Package version 1-6 (JP)	WIN, NS, PS4		MMO, RPG	Square Enix		
October 20	The Jackbox Party Pack 9	WIN, OSX, LIN, NS, PS4, PS5, XBO, XBX/S, Stadia		Party	Jackbox Games		
October 20	Mario + Rabbids Sparks of Hope	NS		TBS, Adventure	Ubisoft Milan, Ubisoft Paris	Ubisoft	
October 20	Ultra Kaiju Monster Rancher	NS		RPG	Koei Tecmo	Bandai Namco Entertainment	
October 20	Vampire Survivors	WIN, OSX		Roguelike, Shoot 'em up	Luca Galante		
October 20	Warhammer 40,000: Shootas, Blood & Teef	WIN, NS, PS4, PS5, XBO, XBX/S		Run and gun, Platformer	Rogueside		
October 21	Faith: The Unholy Trinity - Chapter III	WIN		Survival horror	Airdorf Games	New Blood Interactive	
October 21	Gotham Knights	WIN, PS5, XBX/S	Original	Action RPG	WB Games Montréal	Warner Bros. Interactive Entertainment	
October 21	New Tales from the Borderlands	WIN, NS, PS4, PS5, XBO, XBX/S		Adventure	Gearbox Software	2K Games	
October 21	Persona 5 Royal	WIN, NS, PS5, XBO, XBX/S		RPG, Social sim	Atlus	Atlus USA	
October 24	Cosmoteer	WIN	Early access	Sandbox	Walternate Realities	Walternate Realities	
October 25	Mount & Blade II: Bannerlord	WIN, PS4, PS5, XBO, XBX/S		Strategy, Action RPG	TaleWorlds Entertainment	Prime Matter	
October 25	Victoria 3	WIN, OSX, LIN		Grand strategy	Paradox Development Studio	Paradox Interactive	
October 25	Yomawari: Lost in the Dark (NA)	WIN, NS, PS4		Survival horror	Nippon Ichi Software		
October 26	Return to Monkey Island	LIN		Graphic adventure	Terrible Toybox	Devolver Digital	
October 27	Ace Angler: Fishing Spirits (JP)	NS		Sports	Racjin	Bandai Namco Entertainment	
October 27	Aquarium. (JP)	NS, PS4		Visual novel	Entergram		
October 27	Da Capo 4 Fortunate Departures (JP)	NS, PS4		Visual novel	Circus		
October 27	Gunfire Reborn	XBO, XBX/S		Roguelike, FPS	Duoyi Games	505 Games	
October 27	Needy Streamer Overload	NS		Adventure, Visual novel	Xemono, WSS Playground	WSS Playground	
October 27	Paradigm Paradox	NS		Visual novel	Idea Factory	Aksys Games	
October 27	Relayer Advanced	WIN		Tactical RPG	Kadokawa Games	Dragami Games	
October 27	Sackboy: A Big Adventure	WIN		Platformer	Sumo Digital	Sony Interactive Entertainment	
October 27	Signalis	WIN, NS, PS4, XBO		Survival horror	rose-engine	Humble Games, Playism	
October 27	Spiritfarer	iOS, DROID		CMS	Thunder Lotus Games		
October 27	Star Ocean: The Divine Force	WIN, PS4, PS5, XBO, XBX/S		Action RPG	Tri-Ace	Square Enix	
October 28	Ace Angler: Fishing Spirits	NS		Sports	Racjin	Bandai Namco Entertainment	
October 28	Bayonetta 3	NS		Hack and slash	PlatinumGames	Nintendo	
October 28	Call of Duty: Modern Warfare II	WIN, PS4, PS5, XBO, XBX/S	Original	FPS	Infinity Ward	Activision	
October 28	Crystarise	WIN		Action RPG	Yukiusagi Games		
October 28	Dungeon Munchies	PS4, PS5		Action RPG	Majaja	Chorus Worldwide	
October 28	Resident Evil RE:Verse	WIN, PS4, XBO		Survival horror	Capcom		
October 28	Yomawari: Lost in the Dark (EU)	WIN, NS, PS4		Survival horror	Nippon Ichi Software		
November 1	The Darkest Tales	PS4		Platformer, Action-adventure	Trinity Team	101XP	
November 1	Lonesome Village	WIN, NS, PS5, XBX/S		Puzzle, Adventure, Simulation	Ogre Pixel		
November 2	Doraemon Story of Seasons: Friends of the Great Kingdom	WIN, NS, PS5		Life sim, RPG	Marvelous	Bandai Namco Entertainment	
November 2	Mario Party	NS		Party			
November 2	Mario Party 2	NS		Party			
November 2	Sumikko Gurashi: Minna de Rhythm Party (JP)	NS		Rhythm	Nippon Columbia		
November 2	Tanuki Sunset	PS4, PS5		Racing	Rewind Games	Digerati Distribution	
November 3	The Chant	WIN, PS5, XBX/S		Horror, Action-adventure	Brass Token	Prime Matter	
November 3	Endling: Extinction is Forever	PS5, XBX/S		Adventure, Survival	Herobeat Studios	HandyGames	
November 3	The Entropy Centre	WIN, PS4, PS5, XBO, XBX/S		Puzzle	Stubby Games	Playstack	
November 3	Ghost Song	WIN, PS4, XBO, PS5, XBX/S, NS		Metroidvania	Old Moon	Humble Games	
November 3	How to Say Goodbye	iOS, DROID		Puzzle	Arte		
November 3	Iron Man VR	WIN		FPS	Camouflaj	Oculus Studios	
November 3	A Memoir Blue	iOS		Adventure	Cloisters Interactive	Annapurna Interactive	
November 3	Space Tail: Every Journey Leads Home	WIN, NS		Adventure, Platformer	Enjoy Studio, Longterm Games	Longterm Games	
November 3	Sword and Fairy: Together Forever	XBO, XBX/S		Action RPG	Softstar	E-Home Entertainment	
November 3	Totally Accurate Battle Simulator	NS		Strategy	Landfall Games		
November 3	WRC Generations	WIN, PS4, PS5, XBO, XBX/S		Racing	Kylotonn	Nacon	
November 4	Goddess of Victory: Nikke	iOS, DROID		TPS, RPG	Shift Up	Level Infinite	
November 4	Harvestella	WIN, NS		Life sim, RPG	Square Enix		
November 4	It Takes Two	NS		Action-adventure, Platformer	Hazelight Studios	Electronic Arts	
November 4	Tanuki Sunset	XBO, XBX/S		Racing	Rewind Games	Digerati Distribution	
November 8	Cobra Kai 2: Dojos Rising	WIN, NS, PS4, PS5, XBX/S		Brawler	Flux Games	GameMill Entertainment	
November 8	Football Manager 2023	WIN, OSX, NS, PS5, XBO, XBX/S, iOS, DROID		Sports	Sports Interactive	Sega	
November 8	A Little to the Left	WIN, OSX		Puzzle	Max Inferno	Secret Mode	
November 8	Return to Monkey Island	PS5, XBX/S		Graphic adventure	Terrible Toybox	Devolver Digital	
November 8	Sifu	NS	Port	Brawler	Sloclap		
November 8	Sonic Frontiers	WIN, NS, PS4, PS5, XBO, XBX/S		Platformer, Action-adventure	Sonic Team	Sega	
November 9	God of War Ragnarök	PS4, PS5	Original	Action-adventure, Hack and slash	Santa Monica Studio	Sony Interactive Entertainment	
November 9	A Little to the Left	NS		Puzzle	Max Inferno	Secret Mode	
November 9	Once Upon a Jester	WIN, NS		Adventure	Bonte Avond	Crunching Koalas	
November 9	Rogue Legacy 2	NS		Platformer, Roguelike, Metroidvania	Cellar Door Games		
November 10	Among Us VR	WIN		Party, Social deduction	Innersloth, Schell Games, Robot Teddy	Innersloth	
November 10	Garfield Lasagna Party (EU)	WIN, NS, PS4, PS5, XBO, XBX/S		Party	Balio Studio	Microids	
November 10	Hakoniwa Bokujou Hitsuji Mura (JP)	NS		Simulation, RPG	Success		
November 10	I-Chu (JP)	NS		Visual novel, Rhythm	OperaHouse	D3 Publisher	
November 10	Kowloon High-School Chronicle	WIN		Dungeon crawl, RPG, Visual novel, Puzzle	Toybox Inc.	Arc System Works	
November 10	Police Simulator: Patrol Officers	PS4, PS5, XBO, XBX/S		Simulation	Aesir Interactive	astragon	
November 10	This Way Madness Lies	WIN		RPG	Zeboyd Games		
November 10	Vampire Survivors	XBO, XBX/S		Roguelike, Shoot 'em up	Luca Galante		
November 11	Atari 50: The Anniversary Celebration	WIN, NS, PS4, PS5, XBO, XBX/S		—N/a	Digital Eclipse	Atari	
November 11	Shadows Over Loathing	WIN, OSX		RPG	Asymmetric Publications		
November 11	Tactics Ogre: Reborn	WIN, NS, PS4, PS5		Tactical RPG	Square Enix		
November 11	Valkyrie Elysium	WIN		Action RPG	Soleil	Square Enix	
November 14	NASCAR Rivals	NS		Racing	Motorsport Games		
November 15	Bendy and the Dark Revival	WIN		Survival horror	Joey Drew Studios		
November 15	Bravery & Greed	WIN, NS, PS4, XBO		Brawler, Roguelike, Dungeon crawl	Rekka Games	Team17	
November 15	Floodland	WIN		City builder	Vile Monarch	Ravenscourt	
November 15	Garfield Lasagna Party (NA)	WIN, NS, PS4, PS5, XBO, XBX/S		Party	Balio Studio	Microids	
November 15	The Lord of the Rings Online: Before the Shadow	WIN		MMO, RPG	Standing Stone Games	Daybreak Game Company	
November 15	Pentiment	WIN, XBO, XBX/S		Adventure	Obsidian Entertainment	Xbox Game Studios	
November 15	RWBY: Arrowfell	WIN, NS, PS4, PS5, XBO, XBX/S		Action-adventure	WayForward	NA/EU: WayForward; JP: Arc System Works	
November 15	Somerville	WIN, XBO, XBX/S		Adventure	Jumpship		
November 15	Wreckfest	iOS, DROID		Racing, Vehicular combat	HandyGames		
November 15	Ys VIII: Lacrimosa of Dana	PS5		Action RPG	Nihon Falcom	NIS America	
November 17	Cardfight!! Vanguard Dear Days	WIN, NS		DCCG	Bushiroad		
November 17	Cyanotype Daydream: The Girl Who Dreamed the World (JP)	NS		Visual novel	Laplacian		
November 17	Goat Simulator 3	WIN, PS5, XBX/S		Action	Coffee Stain North	Coffee Stain Publishing	
November 17	Goodbye World	NS		Puzzle, Adventure	Isolation Studio	PM Studios	
November 17	Monochrome Mobius: Rights and Wrongs Forgotten	JP: PS4, PS5; WW: WIN		RPG	Aquaplus	JP: Aquaplus; WW: Shiravune	
November 17	Opus: Echo of Starsong	iOS		Adventure	Sigono		
November 17	Return to Shironagasu Island (JP)	NS		Visual novel	Tabinomichi		
November 17	SympathyKiss (JP)	NS		Visual novel	Otomate	Idea Factory	
November 17	Wobbledogs	NS		Virtual pet, Sandbox	Animal Uprising	Secret Mode	
November 18	The Dark Pictures Anthology: The Devil in Me	WIN, PS4, PS5, XBO, XBX/S	Original	Interactive drama, Survival horror	Supermassive Games	Bandai Namco Entertainment	
November 18	Finding Paradise	iOS, DROID, NS		Adventure	Freebird Games	XD Inc.	
November 18	Grapple Dog	XBO, XBX/S		Platformer	Medallion Games	Super Rare Games	
November 18	Oddworld: Soulstorm - Oddtimized Edition	NS		Cinematic platformer	Oddworld Inhabitants		
November 18	Pokémon Scarlet and Violet	NS		Monster tamer	Game Freak	The Pokémon Company, Nintendo	
November 18	Spider-Man: Miles Morales	WIN	Port	Action-adventure	Insomniac Games	Sony Interactive Entertainment	
November 18	Ys VIII: Lacrimosa of Dana (EU)	PS5		Action RPG	Nihon Falcom	NIS America	
November 21	Superliminal	PS5, XBX/S		Puzzle	Pillow Castle Games		
November 22	Evil West	WIN, PS4, PS5, XBO, XBX/S		TPS	Flying Wild Hog	Focus Entertainment	
November 22	Five Nights at Freddy's: Security Breach	XBO, XBX/S		Survival horror	Steel Wool Studios	ScottGames	
November 22	Gungrave G.O.R.E.	WIN, PS4, PS5, XBO, XBX/S		Action-adventure	Iggymob	Prime Matter	
November 22	Just Dance 2023 Edition	NS, PS5, XBX/S		Rhythm	Ubisoft Paris	Ubisoft	
November 22	Ship of Fools	WIN, NS, PS5, XBX/S		Roguelike, Action	Fika Productions	Team17	
November 22	World Fighting Soccer 22	WIN		Sports	Melko Game Club		
November 23	Trifox	PS4, PS5		Action-adventure	Glowfish Interactive	Big Sugar	
November 28	World of Warcraft: Dragonflight	WIN, OSX		MMO, RPG	Blizzard Entertainment		
November 29	Disgaea 4: A Promise Revisited	iOS, DROID		Tactical RPG	Nippon Ichi Software		
November 29	The Knight Witch	WIN, NS, PS4, PS5, XBO, XBX/S		Metroidvania, Shoot 'em up	Super Awesome Hyper Dimensional Mega Team	Team17	
November 29	Reigns: Three Kingdoms	iOS, DROID		Strategy	Nerial	Devolver Digital	
November 29	Soccer Story	WIN, NS, PS4, PS5, XBO, XBX/S, Stadia		RPG	PanicBarn	No More Robots	
November 30	Front Mission 1st: Remake	NS		Tactical RPG	MegaPixel Studio	Forever Entertainment	
November 30	Gundam Evolution	PS4, PS5, XBO, XBX/S		FPS	Bandai Namco Studios	Bandai Namco Entertainment	
November 30	The Outbound Ghost	PS4, PS5		Adventure, RPG	Conradical Games	Digerati	
November 30	Sword of the Vagrant	NS, PS4, XBO		Action RPG	O.T.K. Games	Rainy Frog	
November 30	Warhammer 40,000: Darktide	WIN		Action, FPS	Fatshark		
December 1	Elevator Action Returns S-Tribute	WIN, NS, PS4, XBO		Run and gun	City Connection		
December 1	Inscryption	NS		Deck building (roguelike)	Daniel Mullins Games	Devolver Digital	
December 1	Nobunaga's Ambition: Hadou	WIN, iOS, DROID		MMO, TBS	Koei Tecmo		
December 1	The Outbound Ghost	NS		Adventure, RPG	Conradical Games	Digerati	
December 1	Railbound	NS		Puzzle	Afterburn		
December 1	River City Girls 2 (JP)	WIN, NS, PS4, PS5, XBO, XBX/S		Brawler	WayForward	Arc System Works	
December 1	Romancing SaGa: Minstrel Song Remastered	WIN, NS, PS4, PS5, iOS, DROID		RPG	Square Enix		
December 1	Samurai Maiden (JP)	NS, PS4, PS5		Hack and slash	Shade Inc.	D3 Publisher	
December 1	Spirit Hunter: Death Mark II (JP)	NS, PS4		Horror, Adventure, Visual novel	Experience		
December 1	The Walking Dead: Saints & Sinners – Chapter 2: Retribution	WIN, PS4		Survival horror	Skydance Interactive		
December 1	WRC Generations	NS		Racing	Kylotonn	Nacon	
December 1	Yu-Gi-Oh! Rush Duel: Dawn of the Battle Royale!! Let’s Go! Go Rush!! (JP)	NS		DCCG	Konami		
December 2	The Callisto Protocol	WIN, PS4, PS5, XBO, XBX/S	Original	Survival horror	Striking Distance Studios	Krafton	
December 2	Marvel's Midnight Suns	WIN, PS5, XBX/S		TBS	Firaxis Games	2K	
December 2	Need for Speed Unbound	WIN, PS5, XBX/S		Racing	Criterion Games	Electronic Arts	
December 6	Hello Neighbor 2	WIN, PS4, PS5, XBO, XBX/S		Stealth, Survival horror	Dynamic Pixels	tinyBuild	
December 6	Hindsight	PS4, PS5, XBO, XBX/S		Adventure	Team Hindsight	Annapurna Interactive	
December 6	Knights of Honor II: Sovereign	WIN		RTS	Black Sea Games	THQ Nordic	
December 6	Kynseed	WIN	Full release	Life sim, RPG, Sandbox	PixelCount Studios		
December 6	Sky: Children of the Light	PS4		Adventure, Art	Thatgamecompany		
December 7	Ixion	WIN		City builder, Survival	Bulwark Studios	Kasedo Games	
December 8	Chained Echoes	WIN, OSX, LIN, NS, PS4, XBO		RPG	Matthias Linda	Deck13 Spotlight	
December 8	Idol Janshi Suchie-Pai Saturn Tribute (JP)	NS		Digital tabletop	City Connection		
December 8	The Rumble Fish 2	WIN, NS, PS4, PS5, XBO, XBX/S		Fighting	Dimps	3goo	
December 8	Samurai Maiden	WIN, NS, PS4, PS5		Hack and slash	Shade Inc.	D3 Publisher	
December 8	Soukai Tenki (JP)	NS		Visual novel	Altergear	Idea Factory	
December 8	Suzerain	iOS, DROID		Government sim, TBS	Torpor Games		
December 8	Vampire Survivors	iOS, DROID		Roguelike, Shoot 'em up	Luca Galante		
December 8	Witch on the Holy Night	NS, PS4		Visual novel	Type-Moon	Aniplex	
December 9	Adventure Academia: The Fractured Continent	WIN, NS, PS4		Tactical RPG	Acquire	PQube	
December 9	Choo-Choo Charles	WIN		Survival horror, FPS	Two Star Games		
December 9	Dragon Quest Treasures	NS		Action RPG	Tose	Square Enix	
December 9	Jitsu Squad	NS, PS4, PS5, XBO, XBX/S		Brawler	Tanuki Creative Studio	ININ Games	
December 13	Crisis Core: Final Fantasy VII Reunion	WIN, NS, PS4, PS5, XBO, XBX/S	Remaster	Action RPG	Square Enix		
December 13	High on Life	WIN, XBO, XBX/S		FPS	Squanch Games		
December 13	Kentucky Route Zero	iOS, DROID		PCA, Interactive fiction	Cardboard Computer	Netflix Games	
December 13	Neon White	PS4, PS5		FPS, Action	Angel Matrix	Annapurna Interactive	
December 13	Potion Craft: Alchemist Simulator	WIN, XBO, XBX/S		Simulation	Niceplay Games	tinyBuild	
December 13	Twelve Minutes	iOS, DROID		Adventure	Luís António	Netflix Games	
December 14	Lil Gator Game	WIN, NS		Action-adventure	MegaWobble	Playtonic Friends	
December 14	The Witcher 3: Wild Hunt	PS5, XBX/S		Action RPG	CD Projekt Red		
December 15	Aka	WIN, NS		Life sim	Cosmo Gatto	Neowiz	
December 15	Akai Katana Shin	NS, PS4, XBO		Bullet hell	Cave	City Connection	
December 15	Alien Storm	NS		Brawler, Shooter			
December 15	Azure Striker Gunvolt 3	PS4, PS5		Action, Platformer	Inti Creates		
December 15	Blacktail	WIN, PS5, XBX/S		Action-adventure	The Parasight	Focus Entertainment	
December 15	Columns	NS		Puzzle			
December 15	Golden Axe II	NS		Brawler			
December 15	Grime	PS4, PS5, XBO, XBX/S		Metroidvania, Action-adventure, RPG	Clover Bite	Akupara Games	
December 15	River City Girls 2	WIN, NS, PS4, PS5, XBO, XBX/S		Brawler	WayForward	Arc System Works	
December 15	Virtua Fighter 2	NS		Fighting			
December 16	Megaton Musashi X (JP)	NS, PS4, PS5		Action RPG	Level-5		
December 19	Iron Lung	NS		Survival horror, Adventure	Dread XP		
December 19	Mortal Shell: Complete Edition	NS		Action RPG	Cold Symmetry	Playstack	
December 20	Super Lesbian Animal RPG	WIN		RPG	ponett		
December 20	Turnip Boy Commits Tax Evasion	PS4		Action-adventure	Snoozy Kazoo	Graffiti Games	
December 21	Sail Forth	WIN, NS, PS4, PS5, XBO, XBX/S		Action-adventure	Festive Vector	The Quantum Astrophysicists Guild	
December 22	Fitness Boxing Fist of the North Star (JP)	NS		Fitness	Imagineer		
December 22	Hyper Gunsport	WIN, NS, XBO, XBX/S		Action	Necrosoft Games		
December 22	Majestic Majolical (JP)	NS		Visual novel	Dazkarat	Entergram	
December 22	Naraka: Bladepoint	XBO		Action-adventure, Battle royale	Thunder Fire Universe X Studio	NetEase Games	
December 22	Uta no Prince-sama All Star After Secret (JP)	NS		Visual novel	Nippon Ichi Software	Broccoli	
December 22	Valkyrie Profile: Lenneth	PS4, PS5		RPG	tri-Ace	Square Enix	
December 23	Sports Story	NS		Adventure, Sports	Sidebar Games		
December 28	Hyper Gunsport	PS4, PS5		Action	Necrosoft Games		
