= Automatoys =

2022 video game

- Developer: Idle Friday
- Designer: Steffan Glynn
- Programmer: Steffan Glynn
- Composer: Jake Gaule
- Engine: Unity
- Platforms: Android, iOS
- Release: Android, iOS: WW: 18 August 2022
- Genre: Puzzle
- Mode: Single-player

Automatoys is a 2022 puzzle game developed by Idle Friday. In it, the player guides a ball through a series of complex three-dimensional machines. The game was the first independent release of lead developer Steffan Glynn, a former member of State of Play Games. Upon release, Automatoys received mixed reviews, with praise for its level design and gameplay and criticism for its short length.

== Gameplay ==
The player must guide a ball through an Automatoy.

The player guides a ball through a series of machines named Automatoys to reach the end of the course. The player activates, moves and tilts various items of machinery, including ramps and catapults, using a one-touch control method, with some mechanisms varied in intensity by pressing and holding. The course features several obstacles that cause the ball to fall off, requiring the player to start again from the beginning. Completion of the levels provides players with a star ranking out of three depending on how quickly the players completed the level. The game features twelve levels, with the first three levels being free to play, and the remaining nine available upon purchase of the game.

== Reception ==
Reception

Review scores
Publication	Score
Pocket Gamer	3.5/5 stars
148Apps	3.5/5 stars

Critics of Automatoys praised the game's design. Eurogamer commended the game's "complex" and "briskly mechanical" design and the introduction of "new gimmicks" and "new ideas" throughout the gameplay. TouchArcade described the game as "intricate and well-designed", noting its levels increased in complexity and challenge. Pocket Gamer described the design of the Automatoys as "stunning", highlighting the "tactile" and "meticulous" nature of the levels and the "variety of mechanisms to figure out and experiment with". Similarly, 148Apps described the game as a "tactile experience" and found the game to be well adapted to mobile controls, describing the game's controls to be satisfying and have "remarkable accuracy".

However, several critics noted the game's short length. Pocket Gamer noted the "relatively few" levels in the game. Touch Arcade assessed the game to be "on the shorter side", although noted it had "good replay value". 148Apps described the game as "somewhat skin deep" and found the game to not be a "terribly long or challenging experience".

Automatoys was a finalist of the 'Interaction' category for iOS games at the 2023 Apple Design Awards.
