= Sail Forth =

- Developer(s): Festive Vector
- Publisher(s): Quantum Astrophysicists Guild
- Writer(s): Jeff Sparks; Don Thacker
- Composer(s): Andrew Nack
- Platform(s): Microsoft Windows; macOS; PlayStation 4; Xbox One; PlayStation 5; Xbox Series X/S
- Release: 21 December 2022
- Genre(s): Action-adventure
- Mode(s): Single-player

Sail Forth is an action-adventure game developed by Festive Vector and published by Quantum Astrophysicists Guild. It was released on 21 December 2022 for Steam, Epic Games, PlayStation 4, Xbox One, Nintendo Switch, PlayStation 5 and Xbox Series X/S.

== Gameplay ==
In Sail Forth, the player assumes the role of a captain, commanding a fleet of customisable ships in an open-world adventure game. The goal is to navigate across the ocean, discovering and exploring many islands scattered throughout. The game is available in English, German, Mandarin, Japanese and Portuguese.

== Reception ==
Sail Forth

Aggregate score
Aggregator	Score
Metacritic	77/100

Review score
Publication	Score
Nintendo Life	7/10

Sail Forth received "generally favorable" ratings from critics according to review aggregator Metacritic.

Nintendo Life compared the game's world to the procedural generation of No Man's Sky with the visual aesthetics of The Legend of Zelda: The Wind Waker. They praised said visual style, as well as the actual mechanics of sailing, but found that the game was held back by technical limitations of performance and controls.

Eurogamer described the game as "busywork" but found that the game's mechanics and theming made the busywork enjoyable. Compared to Wind Waker, they found that the game did a better job at integrating clues to future parts of the game: areas the player could not yet reach or resources they could not yet use.

PC Gamer praised the realism of the game's sailing mechanics, incorporating realistic sailing techniques while remaining accessible to a casual audience. In contrast, Softpedia opined that realism in sailing was not a primary goal of the game, but that it functioned best when evoking a sense of open-world adventure. They praised the ally-recruiting and fleet-building for improving the sense of exploration, and the "Free Sail" mode for furthering this gameplay.
