= Grapple Dog =

2022 video game

- Developer: Medallion Games
- Publisher: Super Rare Games
- Designer: Joseph Gribbin
- Programmer: Joseph Gribbin
- Artist: Joseph Gribbin
- Composer: Jazz Mickle
- Platforms: Nintendo Switch; Windows; Xbox Series X/S
- Release: February 10, 2022
- Genre: Platform
- Mode: Single-player

Grapple Dog is a 2022 platform game developed by Joseph Gribbin. The game stars Pablo, a dog who traverses through 2D levels using his grappling hook to deal with platforming and enemies.

The game was released for Microsoft Windows, Nintendo Switch, and later the Xbox Series X. On Metacritic, the game received an average of 76/100 indicating "generally favorable reviews".

== Gameplay ==
Grapple Dog is a 2D platformer. The player controls Pablo the dog, using his grappling hook which is used to swing and pull Pablo toward enemies over platforms.

The goal of each stage is to ring a bell at the end of the level. Throughout the stage, there are items to collect such as five purple gems hidden throughout the level. Two other purple gems can be collected by collecting oranges, of which there are 250 per level, and 220 are required to acquire the gems.

== Plot ==
Hundreds of years ago, the people of Partash lived in hunger and hardship. Then one day, The Great Inventor appeared. He built devices to help the people. In turn, those who lived in Partash came to adore him like a king. However, one day a great evil emerged, jealous of The Inventor. Sensing an attack was imminent, The Inventor made plans to protect the people. He scattered the 4 Cosmic Gadgets across Partash, where evil could never find them. After that, The Great Inventor was never seen again. Ever since then, treasure hunters have searched far and wide for the Inventor's devices. Some hope for riches, some for glory and some hope to unlock the secrets of the past.

One thousand years later, historical researchers Pablo, Toni and the Professor land on an island, and Pablo falls through a hole where he meets a robot named Nul. Nul makes Pablo open a door, and Nul places his head to a body. Nul reveals his true nature, and the island begins to crumble. Pablo escapes, and Nul and the robots destroy the island. Nul proceeds to do what he started. Back at the ship, Pablo tells them what happened, and the Professor says no one knows what the Cosmic Gadgets do, but their power may be so strong it destroys the world. They decide to find the Cosmic Gadgets before Nul does and save the world

During the encounters with Null it is revealed Null is from another world, and Null knew and hated The Inventor because to him he was a jerk. Pablo eventually asks Null why he hates The Great Inventor so much and Null tells Pablo the truth; The Inventor never invented anything at all and the robots are the ones who made them which The Inventor stole from them from their dimension, Null tried to warn the people that The Inventor was a fraud but they threw him to the scrapheads, Null waited a thousand years to escape and go home.

== Development ==
Grapple Dog was made independently by Joseph Gribbin of Medallion Games. Gribbin was the game designer, artist and programmer for the game while Jazz Mickle provided the game's soundtrack.

== Reception ==
Reception

Aggregate score
Aggregator	Score
Metacritic	76/100 (Switch)

Review scores
Publication	Score
GameSpot	7/10
Nintendo Life	9/10
Nintendo World Report	7.5/10
NME	3/5

Grapple Dog was released on February 10, 2022, for Nintendo Switch and Windows. It was later released on Xbox Series X on November 18, 2022.

Will Nelson of the NME recommended the game to platform game fans, stating that the game "aims to claim its place among the pantheon of mascot platformers, and it gets incredibly close."

Nelson found that some of the mechanics to be used alongside the grapple ranged from "brilliant" to frustrating due to the slightly imprecise nature of the grappling hook. J.P. Corban of the NintendoWorldReport echoed this, stating " since you can only aim the grappling hook straight up or at a 45-degree angle, there are times when it feels like you should be able to hook onto something but miss."

Ethan Gach included Grapple Dog in his list of fantastic games that went under the radar for Kotaku. Gach declared the game as "one of the tightest arcade games of the year" praising swinging mechanics as "tricky but rewarding" and that it had "boss fights occasionally border on greatness when they aren't feeling overly punishing."

== Sequel ==
A sequel, Grapple Dogs: Cosmic Canines, released on September 12, 2024, for Windows, Nintendo Switch, and Xbox Series X/S.
