= Foretales =

- Developer: Alkemi
- Publisher: Dear Villagers
- Platforms: Nintendo Switch; Windows
- Release: WW: September 15, 2022
- Genre: Deck-building
- Mode: Single-player

Foretales is a deck-building video game developed by Alkemi and published in 2023 by Dear Villagers for Windows and Switch. It is a digital tabletop game in which players attempt to avert a series of catastrophes.

== Gameplay ==
After retrieving a magic item for a client, a thief named Volepain sees disturbing visions. Players control Volepain, an anthropomorphic shoebill, as he attempts to avert impending catastrophes. This is done via deck-building mechanics on a digital tabletop. Players are dealt cards based on the special abilities of Volepain and his companions. Used cards are shuffled back into play by resting, which consumes resources and advances time. Players must solve puzzles and win turn-based card battles to avert the catastrophes in time. Various options are available based on players' choices during the game. Players can rely on fame accrued by good deeds, intimidate opponents through their infamy, engage in bribery, or use special items that they find. For example, a warrant stolen from a city guard will cause bandits into flee.

== Development ==
Dear Villagers released Foretales for Windows and Switch on September 15, 2022. It was developed in France.

== Reception ==
Reception

Aggregate scores
Aggregator	Score
Metacritic	(PC) 74/100 (NS) 77/100
OpenCritic	52% recommend

Review score
Publication	Score
Nintendo World Report	8/10

According to the review aggregation website Metacritic, Foretales received mixed reviews for Windows and positive reviews for Switch. Fellow review aggregator OpenCritic assessed that the game received strong approval, being recommended by 52% of critics. Rock Paper Shotgun called it a "brilliant meld of strategic card battling, smart puzzles and warm, characterful storytelling", and recommended it to fans of narrative deck-building games like Hand of Fate. RPGFan described the gameplay as "a captivating, addictive experience" but criticized a perceived lack of variety, which they felt can make card battles repetitive. Nintendo World Report praised the writing and role-playing opportunities, but they said the Switch port had some user interface issues.
