= XEL =

2022 action-adventure video game

- Developer(s): Tiny Roar
- Publisher(s): Assemble Entertainment
- Platform(s): Windows; Nintendo Switch; PlayStation 4; PlayStation 5; Xbox One; Xbox Series X/S
- Release: Windows; WW: July 12, 2022; Switch; WW: July 14, 2022; Consoles; WW: April 21, 2023
- Genre(s): Action-adventure
- Mode(s): Single-player

XEL is a 2022 action-adventure video game developed by Tiny Roar and published by Assemble Entertainment.

== Gameplay ==
After crashing her spaceship on an alien planet, the pilot, Reid, suffers amnesia. Players control Reid as she explores the planet, solves puzzles, and engages in combat. Reid has the ability to manipulate time and can visit the past to solve some puzzles. It is an action-adventure game inspired by The Legend of Zelda series and features isometric video game graphics.

== Development ==
Tiny Roar is based in Hamburg, Germany. Assemble Entertainment released XEL for Windows on July 12, 2022; Switch two days later; and for PlayStation 4, PlayStation 5, Xbox One, and Xbox Series X/S on April 21, 2023. The same day it was ported to consoles, the Breaking Time DLC was released. This adds another chapter to the story.

== Reception ==
XEL received unfavorable reviews on Metacritic. Nintendo Life said it had the potential to be a good science fiction Zelda-style game, but software bugs and performance issues made it an "ultimately unsatisfying experience". TouchArcade said it was a decent action-adventure game that Zelda fans may enjoy, but the number of technical issues they experienced made it a "mild recommendation". Nintendo World Report called the story "quite boring and lackluster" and said it is "absolutely one of the worst performing games I've seen on the Switch".
