= Super Rare Games =

English video game publisher and distributor

Super Rare Games Limited
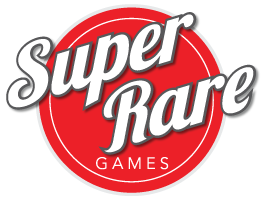
- Type: Private
- Industry: Video games
- Founded: 20 February 2018; 8 years ago
- Headquarters: London, England
- Key people: George Perkins; Stuart Townsend; Verity Murphy; Lindsey Reed
- Website: superraregames.com

Super Rare Games Limited is a video game publisher and distributor based in London, England. The company releases limited print games for the Nintendo Switch which can be purchased from their website. Super Rare Games was founded by George Perkins and is currently led by Perkins, Stuart Townsend, Verity Murphy, and Lindsey Reed. On June 16, 2023, Super Rare Games announced the start of limited print games for the PlayStation 4 and PlayStation 5.

== Business model ==
Each game published and distributed by Super Rare Games is only printed once with a hard limit on number of copies produced. New games are announced once a month. According to Perkins, the reasoning behind this is "when you release [too] much content, you lose the collectability of having a set".

== Releases ==
=== Nintendo Switch ===
Release No.	Date released	Game title	Developer	Collector's Edition available?	SteelBook Edition available?	Units produced	Ref
#1	8 March 2018	Human: Fall Flat	No Brake Games	No	No	5000	
#2	27 April 2018	The Flame in the Flood	The Molasses Flood	No	No	5000	
#3	12 July 2018	Shelter: Generations	Might and Delight	No	No	3000	
#4	16 August 2018	Lovers in a Dangerous Spacetime	Asteroid Base	No	No	3000	
#5	6 September 2018	Mutant Mudds Collection	Atooi	No	No	4000	
#6	1 October 2018	Worms: W.M.D	Team17	No	No	4000	
#7	8 November 2018	Snake Pass	Sumo Digital	No	No	4000	
#8	29 November 2018	N++ Ultimate Edition	Metanet Software	No	No	4000	
#9	3 January 2019	Steredenn: Binary Stars	Pixelnest	No	No	3000	
#10	17 January 2019	The Adventure Pals	Massive Monster	No	No	4000	
#11 & #12	31 January 2019	Knights of Pen & Paper Double Pack	Behold Studios	No	No	3000	
#13	21 February 2019	Q.U.B.E 2	Toxic Games	No	No	4000	
#14	21 March 2019	Fairune Collection	Skipmore	No	No	4000	
#15	18 April 2019	Joe Dever's Lone Wolf	Forge Reply / Atlantyca Lab	No	No	4000	
#16	23 May 2019	EARTHLOCK	Snowcastle Games	Yes	No	5000	
#17	20 June 2019	Machinarium	Amanita Design	No	No	5000	
#18	18 July 2019	Wulverblade	Fully Illustrated / Darkwind Media	No	No	5000	
#19	22 August 2019	Toki-Tori Collection	Two Tribes	No	No	5000	
#20	22 August 2019	RIVE: Ultimate Edition	Two Tribes	No	No	5000	
#21	26 September 2019	The Darkside Detective	Spooky Doorway	No	No	5000	
#22	17 October 2019	Evoland: Legendary Edition	Shiro Games	No	No	5000	
#23	14 November 2019	SteamWorld Quest: Hand of Gilgamech	Image & Form	No	No	7000	
#24	28 November 2019	The Gardens Between	The Voxel Agents	Yes	No	5000	
#25	16 January 2020	Smoke and Sacrifice	Solar Sail Games	No	No	5000	
#26	6 February 2020	Octahedron	Demimonde	No	No	4000	
#27	27 February 2020	World of Goo	Tomorrow Corporation	No	Yes	6000	
#28	12 March 2020	Assault Android Cactus +	Witch Beam	No	No	4000	
#29	26 March 2020	Mechstermination Force	Hörberg Productions	No	No	4000	
#30	16 April 2020	The Sexy Brutale	Tequila Works	Yes	No	4000	
#31	7 May 2020	Little Inferno	Tomorrow Corporation	No	Yes	3000	
#32	28 May 2020	Tricky Towers	WeirdBeard	No	No	4000	
#33	18 June 2020	Graceful Explosion Machine	Vertex Pop	No	No	4000	
#34	16 July 2020	SteamWorld Dig: A Fistful of Dirt	Image & Form	No	No	2000	
#35	16 July 2020	SteamWorld Heist	Image & Form	No	No	3000	
#36	30 July 2020	Old School Musical	La Moutarde	No	No	4000	
#37	13 August 2020	Chroma Squad	Behold Studios	No	No	4000	
#38	3 September 2020	Dandara: Trials of Fear Edition	Long Hat House	Yes	No	5000	
#39	17 September 2020	Freedom Finger	Wide Right Interactive	No	No	4000	
#40	8 October 2020	Darkwood	Acid Wizard Studio	No	No	5000	
#41	29 October 2020	Monster Prom XXL	Beautiful Glitch	Yes	Yes	7000	
#42	12 November 2020	Yes, Your Grace	Brave At Night	No	No	4000	
#43	26 November 2020	Ghost of a Tale	SeithCG	No	No	5000	
#44	7 January 2021	ITTA	Glass Revolver	No	Yes	3000	
#45	28 January 2021	Project Warlock	Buckshot Software	No	No	4000	
#46	18 February 2021	Lonely Mountains: Downhill	Megagon Industries	No	No	5000	
#47	4 March 2021	Creaks	Amanita Design	No	Yes	3000	
#48	25 March 2021	Brothers: A Tale of Two Sons	Starbreeze Studios	No	No	5000	
#49	15 April 2021	Unrailed!	Indoor Astronaut	No	No	4000	
#50	29 April 2021	ABZÛ	Giant Squid	No	Yes	5000	
#51	20 May 2021	INMOST	Hidden Layer Games	No	Yes	5000	
#52	10 June 2021	Mi'pu'mi' Collection	Mi'pu'mi' Games	No	No	4000	
#53	30 June 2021	Last Day of June	Ovosonico	No	No	5000	
#54	22 July 2021	Super Crush KO	Vertex Pop	No	Yes	2000	
#55	5 August 2021	Littlewood	Smash Games	No	No	4000	
#56	26 August 2021	Röki	Polygon Treehouse	No	No	4000	
#57	16 September 2021	Deponia Collection	Daedalic Entertainment	Yes	No	3000	
#58	7 October 2021	Metal Unit	JellySnow Studio	No	No	4000	
#59	28 October 2021	Dogworld	Lateralis	No	No	3000	
#60	25 November 2021	Mundaun	Hidden Fields	No	No	4000	
#61	9 December 2021	Caveblazers	Deadpan Games	No	No	4000	
#62	13 January 2022	Bloodroots	Paper Cult	No	No	4000	
#63	27 January 2022	Horace	Paul Helman	No	No	4000	
#64	17 February 2022	Book of Demons	Thing Trunk	No	No	4000	
#65	10 March 2022	Sally Face	Portable Moose	Yes	Yes	3000	
#66	24 March 2022	Flynn: Son of Crimson	Studio Thunderhorse	No	No	4000	
#67	14 April 2022	Archvale	idoz & phops	No	No	4000	
#68	5 May 2022	Superliminal	Pillow Castle Games	Yes	Yes	3000	
#69	19 May 2022	Rogue Heroes	Heliocentric Studios	No	No	4000	
#70	9 June 2022	Wytchwood	Alientrap	No	No	4000	
#71	30 June 2022	Strange Brigade	Rebellion Developments	No	Yes	3000	
#72	21 July 2022	Aerial_Knight's Never Yield	Aerial_Knight	No	No	4000	
#73	4 August 2022	Webbed	Sbug Games	No	No	4000	
#74	25 August 2022	A Short Hike	Adam Robinson-Yu	Yes	No	6000	
#75	8 September 2022	Necrobarista	Route 59	No	No	4000	
#76	22 September 2022	Dicey Dungeons	Terry Cavanagh	No	No	5000	
#77	13 October 2022	The Touryst	Shin'en Multimedia	No	Yes	4000	
#78	13 October 2022	Fast RMX	Shin'en Multimedia	No	Yes	4000	
#79	27 October 2022	Grapple Dog	Super Rare Games	Yes	Yes	3000	
#80	10 November 2022	Will You Snail?	No Gravity Games	No	No	4000	
#81	24 November 2022	Transiruby	Skipmore / Esquadra	No	No	4000	
#82	5 January 2023	Source of Madness	Carry Castle	No	Yes	4000	
#83	19 January 2023	Hell is Other Demons	Cuddle Monster Games	No	No	3000	
#84	2 February 2023	Heaven Dust Collection	One Gruel Studio	No	No	4000	
#85	23 February 2023	Hell Pie	Sluggerfly	No	Yes	2000	
#86	9 March 2023	Islets	Kyle Thompson	No	No	4000	
#87	30 March 2023	Atomik: RunGunJumpGun	ThirtyThree	No	No	4000	
#88	13 April 2023	Lost in Play	Happy Juice Games	No	Yes	2000	
#89	27 April 2023	Spirit & The Mouse	Alblune	No	No	4000	
#90	11 May 2023	Dungeon Defenders: Awakened	Chromatic Games	No	No	4000	
#91	25 May 2023	Wavetale	Zoink! Games	No	Yes	2000	
#92	29 June 2023	Totally Accurate Battle Simulator (TABS)	Landfall Games	No	No	4000	
#93	15 June 2023	Happy Game/Pilgrims	Amanita Design	No	No	4000	
#94	20 July 2023	Haiku, the Robot	Mister Morris Games	No	No	4000	
#95	3 August 2023	Orbital Bullet	SmokeStab	No	No	3000	
#96	24 August 2023	Post Void	Super Rare Games	No	Yes	2000	
#97	14 September 2023	Here Comes Niko!	Gears For Breakfast	Yes	No	4000	
#98	28 September 2023	Akupara Collection	Akupara Games	No	No	3000	
#99	12 October 2023	The Tartarus Key	Vertical Reach	No	No	3000	
#100	26 October 2023	Lil Gator Game	MegaWobble	Yes	Yes	1000	
#101	9 November 2023	The Darkside Detective: A Fumble in the Dark	SpookyDoorway	No	No	3000	
#102	23 November 2023	Tinykin	Splashteam	No	No	4000	
#103	7 December 2023	Fights in Tight Spaces	Ground Shatter	No	No	3000	
#104	11 January 2024	Ship of Fools	Fika Productions	No	No	4000	
#105	1 February 2024	Fran Bow	Killmonday Games	No	No	3000	
#106	15 February 2024	HAAK	Blingame	No	No	3000	
#107/108	7 March 2024	Monster Camp and Monster Roadtrip Double Pack	Beautiful Glitch	No	No	4000	
#109	21 March 2024	Dorfromantik	Toukana Interactive	No	No	4000	
#110	11 April 2024	Nightmare Reaper	Blazing Bit Games	No	No	3000	
#111	2 May 2024	Crowns and Pawns: Kingdom of Deceit	Tag of Joy	No	No	3000	
#112	16 May 2024	Wargroove 1 + 2	Chucklefish	No	No	4000	
#113	6 June 2024	Cassette Beasts	Bytten Studio	Yes	No	9000	
#114	27 June 2024	Cavern of Dreams	Bynine Studio	No	No	4000	
#115	11 July 2024	Streets of Rogue	Matt Dabrowski	No	No	4000	
#116	25 July 2024	GRIME	Clover Bite	No	No	4000	
#117	8 August 2024	Lil' Guardsman	Hilltop Studios	No	No	4000	
#118	22 August 2024	Smushi Come Home	SomeHumbleOnion	No	No	4000	
#119	12 September 2024	Wildfrost	Deadpan Games Gaziter	No	No	3000	
#120	26 September 2024	Duck Detective	Happy Broccoli Games	No	No	4000	
#121	10 October 2024	Gibbon: Beyond the Trees	Broken Rules	No	No	3000	
#122	31 October 2024	The Mortuary Assistant	DarkStone Digital	No	No	4000	
#123	14 November 2024	Postal: Brain Damaged	Hyperstrange, CreativeForge Games	No	No	3000	
#124	5 December 2024	Afterdream	Jesse Makkonen	No	No	3000	
#125	9 January 2025	SteamWorld Build	The Station	No	No	4000	
#126	23 January 2025	Nuclear Throne	Vlambeer	No	No	4000	
#127	6 February 2025	The Last Hero of Nostalgaia	Over the Moon	No	No	3000	
#128	27 February 2025	Cyber Shadow	Mechanical Head Studios	Yes	No	6500 (Standard) + 2500 (Deluxe)	
#129	13 March 2025	#BLUD	Exit 73 Studios	No	No	3000	
#130	27 March 2025	A Highland Song	Inkle	No	No	3000	
#131	17 April 2025	Planet of Lana	Wishfully Studios	Yes	No	4000 (Standard) + 1000 (Deluxe)	
#132	1 May 2025	Terra Memoria	La Moutarde	No	No	3000	
#133	15 May 2025	Astrea: Six-Sided Oracles	Little Leo Games	No	No	3000	
#134	29 May 2025	Laika: Aged Through Blood	Brainwash Gang	Yes	No	3000 (Standard) + 1000 (Deluxe)	
#135	19 June 2025	The Pedestrian	Skookum Arts	No	No	4000	
#136	3 July 2025	Aka	Cosmo Gatto	No	No	3000	
#137	24 July 2025	Vigil: The Longest Night	Glass Heart Games	No	No	4000	
#138	07 August 2025	Great God Grove	Fellow Traveller	No	No	4000	
#139	12 September 2025	Mail Time	Kela van der Deijl	No	No	3000	
#140	25 September 2025	Spiritfall	Gentle Giant	No	No	4000	
#141	9 October 2025	The Pale Beyond	Saltstone Studios	No	No	3000	
#142	23 October 2025	Banner of the Maid	Azure Flame Studio	No	No	4000	
#143	13 November 2025	Moonstone Island	Studio Supersoft	Yes	No	6000 (Standard) + 2000 (Deluxe)	
#144	27 November 2025	Siralim Ultimate	Thylacine Studios	No	No	4000	
#145	11 December 2025	Melatonin	Half Asleep	No	No	3000	
#146	8 January 2026	Shovel Knight Dig	Yacht Club Games, Nitrome	No	No	5000	
#147	22 January 2026	Dark Deity 1 & 2	Sword & Axe LLC	No	No	4000	
#148	5 February 2026	Bad End Theater	NomnomNami	No	No	5000	
#149	19 February 2026	Grapple Dogs Cosmic Canines	Medallion Games	No	No	3000	
#150	19 February 2026	Tiny Terry's Turbo Trip	Snekflat	No	No	4000	
#151	19 February 2026	Duck Detective: The Ghost of Glamping	Happy Broccoli Games	No	No	3000	
#152	12 March 2026	Out of Sight	The Gang	Yes	No	4000 (Standard) + 1500 (Deluxe)	
#153	26 March 2026	Savant - Ascent REMIX	D-Pad Studio	No	No	4000	
#154	9 April 2026	Toree & Friends Collection	Siactro	No	No	4000	
#155	7 May 2026	Home Safety Hotline	Night Signal Entertainment	No	No	4000	
#156	21 May 2026	Bloodshed	com8com1 Software	No	No	3000	
#157	4 June 2026	Platypus Reclayed	Claymatic Games	No	No	3000	
#158	18 June 2026	Chained Echoes (Complete Edition)	Umami Tiger	Yes	No	10000 (Standrard) + 5000 (Deluxe)	
#159	9 July 2026	Sticky Business	Spellgarden Games	No	No	3000	
#160	23 July 2026	Little Misfortune	Killmonday Games	No	No	5000	
#161	27 August 2026	The Golden Idol Saga	Color Gray Games	Yes	No	2800 (Standard) + 1200 (Deluxe)	
#162	10 September 2026	Escape from Ever After	Sleepy Castle Studio, Wing-It! Creative	No	No	4000	
#163	8 October 2026	Wax Heads	Patattie Games	No	No	3000	
#164	12 November 2026	KILL KNIGHT	PlaySide Studios	No	No	4000	

=== Nintendo Switch 2 ===
Release No.	Date released	Game title	Developer	Collector's Edition available?	SteelBook Edition available?	Units produced	Ref
#1	23 April 2026	Minishoot' Adventures	SoulGame Studio	Yes	No	5000 (Standard) + 2000 (Special)	
#2	13 August 2026	The Midnight Walk	MoonHood	Yes	No	5000 (Standard) + 2000 (Special)	
#3	29 October 2026	Haste	Landfall	Yes	No	4250 (Standard) + 1750 (Special)	
#4	26 November 2026	Little Rocket Lab	Teenage Astronauts	No	No	4000	

=== PlayStation 4 ===
Release No.	Date released	Game title	Developer	Collector's Edition available?	SteelBook Edition available?	Units produced	Ref
#1	22 June 2023	Source of Madness	Carry Castle	No	No	1000	
#2	22 June 2023	The Touryst	Shin'en Multimedia	No	No	1000	
#3	22 June 2023	Flynn: Son of Crimson	Studio Thunderhorse	No	No	1000	
#4	12 October 2023	The Tartarus Key	Vertical Reach	No	No	1000	
#5	26 October 2023	A Short Hike	Adam Robinson-Yu	No	No	2000	

=== PlayStation 5 ===
Release No.	Date released	Game title	Developer	Collector's Edition available?	SteelBook Edition available?	Units produced	Ref
#1	22 June 2023	Source of Madness	Carry Castle	No	No	1000	
#2	24 August 2023	Post Void	Super Rare Games	No	Yes	750	
#3	24 August 2023	Hell Pie	Sluggerfly	No	No	1000	
#4	9 November 2023	The Darkside Detective Duology	SpookyDoorway	No	No	1000	
#5	11 January 2024	Ship of Fools	Fika Productions	No	No	1000	
#6	25 July 2024	Sable	Shedworks	No	No	2000	
#7	25 July 2024	OTXO	Lateralis Heavy Industries	No	No	1000	
#8	25 July 2024	GRIME Definitive Edition	Clover Bite	No	No	1000	
#9	31 October 2024	Somerville	Jumpship	No	No	2000	
#10	31 October 2024	The Mortuary Assistant	DarkStone Digital	No	No	2000	
#11	14 November 2024	Postal: Brain Damaged	Hyperstrange, CreativeForge Games	No	No	1500	
#12	9 January 2025	SteamWorld Build	The Station	No	No	2000	
#13	23 January 2025	Go Mecha Ball	Whale Peak Games	No	No	1500	
#14	6 February 2025	The Last Hero of Nostalgaia	Over the Moon	No	No	1500	
#15	27 February 2025	Cyber Shadow	Mechanical Head Studios	No	No	2000	
#16	17 April 2025	Planet of Lana	Wishfully	Yes	No	2000 (Standard) + 500 (Deluxe)	
#17	29 May 2025	Laika: Aged Through Blood	Brainwash Gang	Yes	No	2000 (Standard) + 500 (Deluxe)	
#18	19 June 2025	The Pedestrian	Skookum Arts LLC	No	No	1500	
#19	30 October 2025	Post Trauma	RED SOUL GAMES	No	No	2500	
#20	13 November 2025	Dungeons of Hinterberg	Microbird Games	No	No	2500	
#21	8 January 2026	Shovel Knight Dig	Nitrome, Yacht Club Games	No	No	3000	
#22	22 January 2026	Dark Deity 2	Sword & Axe LLC	No	No	2000	
#23	19 February 2026	Tiny Terry's Turbo Trip	Snekflat	No	No	1300	
#24	12 March 2026	Out of Sight	The Gang Studio	No	No	2000	
#25	26 March 2026	A.I.L.A	Pulsatrix Studios	No	No	3500	
#26	23 April 2026	Minishoot' Adventures	SoulGame Studio	No	No	2000	
#27	7 May 2026	Home Safety Hotline	Night Signal Entertainment	No	No	2000	
#28	21 May 2026	Bloodshed	com8com1 Software	No	No	1500	
#29	4 June 2026	Platypus Reclayed	Claymatic Games	No	No	1500	
#30	10 September 2026	Escape from Ever After	Sleepy Castle Studio, Wing-It! Creative	No	No	2000	
#31	18 September 2026	Dying Light: The Beast (Definitive Edition)	Techland	Yes	No	6000 (Definitive Edition) + 2500 (Limited Anniversary Edition)	
#32	29 October 2026	Haste	Landfall	No	No	2500	
#33	12 November 2026	KILL NIGHT	PlaySide Studios	No	No	2000	
