= Freeplay Independent Games Festival =

Video game festival in Australia

- The Freeplay 2018 logo

- The 2018 Freeplay visual identity art
- Status: Active
- Genre: Independent video game development
- Frequency: Annually
- Locations: Melbourne, Victoria
- Country: Australia
- Years active: 22
- Established: 21 May 2004
- Founder: Katharine Neil & Marcus Westbury
- Most recent: 5 October 2023
- Previous event: Parallels (2023)
- Next event: 2024 Awards
- Participants: 50+
- Attendance: 500+
- Sponsors: Australia Council for the Arts; Film Victoria; Victoria State Government; City of Melbourne; ACMI; RMIT University
- Website: freeplay.net.au

The Freeplay Independent Games Festival is Australia's longest-running and largest independent games festival, first established in 2004. The Festival celebrates fringe artists and game makers, and highlights grassroots developers and art games. It gathers artists, designers, programmers, writers, gamers, creators, games critics, games academics and students to celebrate the art form of independent games and the culture around them.

Freeplay is funded primarily through arts grants. Past and present sponsors include Australia Council for the Arts, Film Victoria, Victoria State Government, City of Melbourne, Australian Centre for the Moving Image (ACMI), and RMIT University.

With the aim of celebrating game making as arts practice, Freeplay has consistently aligned itself with the arts, and over the years has partnered with arts organisations such as Australian Centre for the Moving Image, State Library Victoria, Next Wave Festival, Wheeler Centre, Federation Square, Arts Centre Melbourne, National Gallery of Victoria, City of Melbourne, Arts House, National Young Writers' Festival, and more.

Freeplay has no current director. Previous directors have included Mads Mackenzie and Louie Roots (2023–2025), Chad Toprak (2017–2022), Dan Golding (2014–2017), Katie Williams and Harry Lee Shang Lun (2013–2014), Paul Callaghan and Eve Penford-Dennis (2008–2012). The founding directors of Freeplay were Katherine Neil and Marcus Westbury.

== History ==
The Freeplay Independent Games Festival began in 2004 as Next Wave Festival's three-day-long Melbourne-based indie games conference 'Free Play', to celebrate independent game development and games culture. Since then, it has run in a variety of formats and venues across Melbourne.

In 2009, Freeplay hosted its first festival away from Next Wave, and rebranded itself from 'Free Play: The Next Wave Independent Game Developers Conference' into 'Freeplay Independent Games Festival'. Since 2009, Freeplay events have generally run annually.

In 2014, inspired by Venus Patrol's alternative E3 press conference Horizon, Freeplay introduced Parallels, a one-night event that serves as a counterpart to the main Freeplay festival. It takes place as part of Melbourne International Games Week, and highlights "unique, experimental, personal, and culturally significant games" made in the region. Parallels "is notable for providing the public first looks at games that would go on to be global gaming phenomena," including Untitled Goose Game, Necrobarista, Florence, Paperbark, Heavenly Bodies, the Frog Detective series, Unpacking, and Cult of the Lamb.

In 2015, Freeplay held, for the first time, both a multi-day Freeplay festival (10–19 April 2015) and a Parallels event (24 October 2015).

2020 and 2021 saw a virtual festival take place due to the COVID-19 pandemic. For the online Parallels showcases, Freeplay created an online pixel art version of the event's in-person venue, The Capitol, called The Zone, described by Kotaku as "a pixel-art version of an art gallery, except its for video games and you're doing the whole thing through your browser."

In 2022, Parallels took place at RMIT, marking Freeplay's return to in-person events.

== Freeplay Festival ==
Date	Theme	Keynote speaker(s)	Venue
21–23 May 2004	(As part of Next Wave Festival: 'Unpopular Culture')	Harvey Smith	The World Wing Chun Kung Fu Association 3rd Floor, 96 Flinders Street, Melbourne
15–17 July 2005		Greg Costikyan, Kieron Gillen	Australian Centre for the Moving Image
18 August 2007		Jonathan Blow	Australian Centre for the Moving Image
14–15 August 2009		Petri Purho	State Library Victoria
14–15 August 2010	Play Is Everywhere	Brandon Boyer, Adam Saltsman	State Library Victoria
17–21 August 2011	Handmade	No keynote	State Library Victoria
19–23 September 2012	Chaos and Grace	Mare Sheppard, Morgan Jaffit	State Library Victoria
25–29 September 2013	Volume of Revolution	Erin Robinson, Steve Swink	State Library Victoria
10–19 April 2015		Austin Wintory	Australian Centre for the Moving Image
22–27 May 2018	Intersections	Zuraida Buter, Auriea Harvey and Michaël Samyn	Australian Centre for the Moving Image
7–12 May 2019	Introspection	Hannah Nicklin, Richard Lemarchand	RMIT University
10-14 June 2020	Belonging	Bahiyya Khan	Online (due to COVID-19 pandemic)
8-13 June 2021	Soft Voices, Loud Roars	Squinky, Zedeck Siew	Online (due to COVID-19 pandemic)

== Freeplay Parallels ==
Date	Game	Creator	Venue
2014
18 October 2014	Push Me Pull You	House House	Australian Centre for the Moving Image (ACMI)
18 October 2014	Gonubie Hotel Booot; Action Painting Pro	Ian MacLarty	Australian Centre for the Moving Image (ACMI)
18 October 2014	Magister Ludi	Christy Dena, Marigold Bartlett, Trevor Dikes, Cameron Owen	Australian Centre for the Moving Image (ACMI)
18 October 2014	Movement Study 1	Sam Crisp, Marigold Bartlett, Jamie Anderson, Adrienne Owen, Alexander Perrin	Australian Centre for the Moving Image (ACMI)
18 October 2014	FUTUREVOXIMAGINARIUMDOTEXE	Ben Weatherall, Jason Bakker	Australian Centre for the Moving Image (ACMI)
18 October 2014	Magenta Sunset Spacething	Impromptu Games	Australian Centre for the Moving Image (ACMI)
18 October 2014	Provision Supply Cat	Alexander Perrin	Australian Centre for the Moving Image (ACMI)
18 October 2014	Bush Bash	SK Games	Australian Centre for the Moving Image (ACMI)
18 October 2014	CTRL_CODA	Josh Cousins, Maize Wallin, Sine Morris, Amani Naseem	Australian Centre for the Moving Image (ACMI)
2015
24 October 2015	Knuckle Sandwich	Andrew Brophy	Australian Centre for the Moving Image (ACMI)
24 October 2015	Undercity_Discotech	Chalk in Rain	Australian Centre for the Moving Image (ACMI)
24 October 2015	Vertex Meadow	Ian MacLarty	Australian Centre for the Moving Image (ACMI)
24 October 2015	Project Ven (later renamed Necrobarista)	Joe Liu, Ngoc Vu, Kevin Chen	Australian Centre for the Moving Image (ACMI)
24 October 2015	Broken Sounds	Lee Shang Lun, Amani Naseem, Harrison Smith	Australian Centre for the Moving Image (ACMI)
24 October 2015	Untitled Project	Marigold Bartlett, Lizzie Bartlett	Australian Centre for the Moving Image (ACMI)
24 October 2015	Intergalactic Space Princess	Izzy Gramp, Laura Stokes	Australian Centre for the Moving Image (ACMI)
24 October 2015	Polymodal Arcade	Andrew Trevillian	Australian Centre for the Moving Image (ACMI)
24 October 2015	Paperbark	Nina Bennett, Kael Jessup, Terry Burdak, Ryan Boulton	Australian Centre for the Moving Image (ACMI)
2017
26 October 2017	Wayward Strand	Ghost Pattern	RMIT University
26 October 2017	Totem Teller	Grinning Pickle	RMIT University
26 October 2017	Putty Pals	Harmonious Games	RMIT University
26 October 2017	OfficeBots: Reality Bytes	FutureStateMachine	RMIT University
26 October 2017	Road Trip Do You Remember	Joanna Tran	RMIT University
26 October 2017	A Moment Between Us	Ruby Simpson, Aaron Williams	RMIT University
26 October 2017	Sandstorm Reap Planetarium	Daniel Linssen	RMIT University
26 October 2017	It Will Be Hard	Hien Pham	RMIT University
26 October 2017	Florence	Mountains	RMIT University
26 October 2017	Action Loop	PlayReactive	RMIT University
26 October 2017	Untitled Goose Game	House House	RMIT University
2018
25 October 2018	Rise	Dakoda Barker	RMIT University
25 October 2018	Unpacking	Wren Brier, Tim Dawson	RMIT University
25 October 2018	Pigeon Game	Leura Smith	RMIT University
25 October 2018	if not us	Ruqiyah Patel	RMIT University
25 October 2018	Sign In / Sign Out	Tegan Webb	RMIT University
25 October 2018	Novena Touch Melbourne	Cecile Richard, Andrew Gleeson	RMIT University
25 October 2018	Desert Child	Oscar Brittain	RMIT University
25 October 2018	SIMULACRA	LeeYing Foo	RMIT University
25 October 2018	Dead Static Drive	Mike Blackney	RMIT University
25 October 2018	Vignettes	Pol Clarissou	RMIT University
2019
10 October 2019	Paint Game	Max Myers	The Capitol Theatre
10 October 2019	Dollhouse	Olivia Haines	The Capitol Theatre
10 October 2019	I Must Reach the Top Every Brick Laid	Fenreliania	The Capitol Theatre
10 October 2019	Need 4e+9 Speed	Kalonica Quigley, Jason Bakker	The Capitol Theatre
10 October 2019	Heavenly Bodies	2pt Interactive	The Capitol Theatre
10 October 2019	The Library of Babble	Demi Schänzel	The Capitol Theatre
10 October 2019	سايبر تصوف Cyber Tasawwuf	Mohamed Chamas	The Capitol Theatre
10 October 2019	Acrylic	Lucy Morris	The Capitol Theatre
10 October 2019	Mutazione	Die Gute Fabrik	The Capitol Theatre
10 October 2019	Way to the Woods	Anthony Tan	The Capitol Theatre
10 October 2019	Frog Detective 2: The Case of the Invisible Wizard	Worm Club	The Capitol Theatre
2020
8 October 2020	Dap	Melting Parrot	Online (due to COVID-19 pandemic)
8 October 2020	Umurangi Generation	ORIGAME DIGITAL	Online (due to COVID-19 pandemic)
8 October 2020	Street Tape Games	Helen Kwok	Online (due to COVID-19 pandemic)
8 October 2020	Spiritwell	David Chen	Online (due to COVID-19 pandemic)
8 October 2020	Completely Stretchy and Uncomfortably Sticky	Daniel Ferguson	Online (due to COVID-19 pandemic)
8 October 2020	Webbed	Riley Neville	Online (due to COVID-19 pandemic)
8 October 2020	variations on the word ghost	Shastra Deo	Online (due to COVID-19 pandemic)
8 October 2020	The Stranger Next Door	Fae Daunt	Online (due to COVID-19 pandemic)
8 October 2020	Short Creepy Tales: 7PM	Cellar Vault Games	Online (due to COVID-19 pandemic)
2021
7 October 2021	A Long Goodbye	Dana McKay	Online (due to COVID-19 pandemic)
7 October 2021	Monomyth	Siobhan Dent	Online (due to COVID-19 pandemic)
7 October 2021	Blueberry	Mellow Games	Online (due to COVID-19 pandemic)
7 October 2021	An Altogether Different River	Aaron Lim	Online (due to COVID-19 pandemic)
7 October 2021	Soup Pot	Chikon Club	Online (due to COVID-19 pandemic)
7 October 2021	Where the Snow Settles	Myriad Games Studio	Online (due to COVID-19 pandemic)
7 October 2021	Cult of the Lamb	Massive Monster	Online (due to COVID-19 pandemic)
2022
6 October 2022	Mars First Logistics	Shape Shop	RMIT University
6 October 2022	Future Folklore	Guck	RMIT University
6 October 2022	Gubbins	Studio Folly	RMIT University
6 October 2022	Wizard Chess Song of the Fae	TWO PM	RMIT University
6 October 2022	Letters to Arralla	Pink Clouds	RMIT University
6 October 2022	Isopod: A Webbed Story	Sbug	RMIT University
6 October 2022	Bits and Bops	Tempo Labs	RMIT University
6 October 2022	Conscript	Catchweight Studio	RMIT University
6 October 2022	Frog Detective 3: Corruption at Cowboy County	Worm Club	RMIT University
2023
5 October 2023	Moss Island	Iris Anstey	Australian Centre for the Moving Image (ACMI)
5 October 2023	Beyond the Lens	Ben Koder	Australian Centre for the Moving Image (ACMI)
5 October 2023	Knuckle Sandwich	Andrew Brophy	Australian Centre for the Moving Image (ACMI)
5 October 2023	Bell's Beach	Chloe Kilroy, Siobhan Dent	Australian Centre for the Moving Image (ACMI)
5 October 2023	Janet DeMornay Is A Slumlord (and a Witch)	Pete Foley, Scott Ford	Australian Centre for the Moving Image (ACMI)
5 October 2023	The Dungeon Experience	Jacob Janerka	Australian Centre for the Moving Image (ACMI)
5 October 2023	Video Shop Algorithm	Jessie Scott	Australian Centre for the Moving Image (ACMI)
5 October 2023	Mystiques: Haunted Antiques	Ally McLean Hennessey	Australian Centre for the Moving Image (ACMI)
5 October 2023	Proximate	Cain Maddox	Australian Centre for the Moving Image (ACMI)

== Freeplay Awards ==
Year	Awards
2010	Best Australian Game: Jolly Rover; Best Design in a Game: Up Down Ready; Best On-Paper Design: iCrazy Man; Best Art in a Game: Captain Forever (Series); Best Concept Art: Exodus; Best Technical Innovation: Colourbind; Best Game Writing: Transumer; Best Audio: Train Conductor; Best International Game: Last Hope
2011	Best Australian Game: Antichamber; Best International Game: The Swapper; Best Design: Antichamber; Best On-Paper Design: Dead Eye; Best Art: Warco; Best Concept Art: Firo; Best Technical Innovation: Kingspray; Best Game Writing: MacGuffin's Curse; Best Audio: Solar 2
2012	Best Australian Game: Stickets; Best Design in a Game: They Love You; Best International Game: Splice; Best Art in a Game: Toybox; Best Concept Art: Peleda; Best Audio in a Game: Lunar Flight; Best Technical Innovation: Automation; Best Writing in a Game: Flatland: Fallen Angle
2013	Best Game: Framed; Design: Framed; Visual Art: The Paper Fox; Audio Design: Particulars; Narrative: Particulars; Technical Innovation: Turnover; Non-Digital: Outside These City Walls; People's Choice: Turnover
2015	The Freeplay Award: Push Me Pull You; Best Design: Push Me Pull You; Best Visual Art: Movement Study 1 Best Audio: Submerged; Best Narrative: Project Ven; Best Tech: Space Dust Racers; Best Non-Digital: Rise to Power
2018	The Freeplay Award: The Catacombs of Solaris; Excellence in Design: Dissembler; Excellence in Visual Art: Paperbark; Excellence in Audio: Florence; Excellence in Narrative: Bound By Blood; Non-Digital Game Award: {<>} Micro-Game Award: Rise; Experimental Game Award: Thomas Bowker's Draw; Student Game Award: Lacuna; Across The Ditch Award: Echo Grotto
2019	The Freeplay Award: New Ice York; Excellence in Design: JUMPGRID; Excellence in Visual Art: Necrobarista; Excellence in Audio: Skyward Journey; Excellence in Narrative: The Haunted Island, a Frog Detective Game; Non-Digital Game Award: Edible Games Cookbook; Micro-Game Award: Novena; Experimental Game Award: The Common Campfire; Student Game Award: Pigeon Game; Across The Ditch Award: Toripon 鳥ポン
2020	The Freeplay Award: A Hand with Many Fingers; Excellence in Design: Colestia; Excellence in Visual Art: Endless Scroll; Excellence in Audio: Unfamiliar; Excellence in Narrative: Life Tastes Like Cardboard; Non-Digital Game Award: The Outer Whorls; Micro-Game Award: Something Looks Weird; Experimental Game Award: If We Were Allowed to Visit; Student Game Award: Ascent of Grob's Domain; Across The Ditch Award: Leap of Leaf
2021	The Freeplay Award: Umurangi Generation; Excellence in Design: Webbed; Excellence in Visual Art: Completely Stretchy and Uncomfortably Sticky; Excellence in Audio: Mealmates; Excellence in Narrative: A Long Goodbye; Non-Digital Game Award: The Lighthouse at the Edge of the Universe; Micro-Game Award: Under a Star Called Sun; Experimental Game Award: Neon Cyborg Cat Club; Student Game Award: The Snowgardens; Across The Ditch Award: Before We Leave

== See also ==
- IndieCade
- Melbourne International Games Week
- Independent Games Festival
