= Terra Memoria =

2024 video game

- Developer: La Moutarde
- Publisher: Dear Villagers
- Director: François Bertrand
- Artist: Anthony Expert
- Writer: Elisa Beiram
- Composer: Yponeko
- Engine: Unity
- Platforms: Microsoft Windows; Nintendo Switch; PlayStation 5; Xbox Series X/S; macOS
- Release: March 27, 2024
- Genre: Role-playing
- Mode: Single-player

Terra Memoria is a 2024 role-playing video game developed by French studio La Moutarde and published by Dear Villagers. The game follows six characters investigating a crystal shortage and the sudden appearance of ancient machines across a fantasy world populated by anthropomorphic inhabitants. Players explore the world through turn-based combat, puzzle-solving and town-building.

The game was announced during the Guerrilla Collective Showcase in June 2023 and released on March 27, 2024, for Microsoft Windows, Nintendo Switch, PlayStation 5, Xbox Series X/S and macOS. A physical Nintendo Switch edition was released by Super Rare Games in 2025. The game received generally positive reviews, with critics praising its visual style and soundtrack while expressing mixed views on its length and mechanical depth.

== Gameplay ==
Terra Memoria is a turn-based role-playing game with a party of six playable characters. Three characters participate in combat at a time, while the remaining three serve as support members who modify the active characters' abilities. These pairings are randomised at the start of each battle, altering the properties of the active character's spells. A support character might convert a single-target attack into one that hits all enemies, or change a damaging spell into a healing one.

Each spell has a power cost that determines how many turns pass before the caster can act again. Weaker spells allow faster follow-up actions, while stronger spells push the character further back in the turn order. Enemies have elemental weaknesses across six elements; hitting these weaknesses repeatedly can stagger an enemy, making it vulnerable to all elements and pushing it to the back of the turn queue.

Between battles, players rest at campsites and inns where they can cook collected recipes through a rhythm-based minigame. Each meal permanently adds to the party's health, and players gather ingredients by purchasing them from shops or finding them while exploring. Craftable items called Pins function as equipment and can increase attributes including power, defence and speed. Some Pins strengthen one element while weakening another.

Grid-based skill puzzles are scattered throughout the world, requiring players to arrange statues so they resonate simultaneously when struck by magic. Completing these puzzles is the primary way to unlock new abilities for the party. Players can complete side quests that provide additional information about the setting. The game also includes a town-building system through which players construct and decorate a settlement. The settlement does not affect combat or character progression.

== Development ==
Terra Memoria was developed by La Moutarde, an independent studio based in Montpellier, France. The studio had previously released the rhythm game Old School Musical in 2018. The game was directed by François Bertrand, with art direction by Anthony Expert and narrative design by Elisa Beiram. Yponeko composed the soundtrack.

Bertrand described the project as an attempt to create "a timeless adventure in the style of a classic RPG" with modern additions such as building, cooking and crafting. He cited Breath of Fire III as a primary influence on the visual presentation, which combines pixel art character sprites with three-dimensional environments. Previews also compared the visual style to Grandia, noting a similar approach of placing pixel-art characters within 3D worlds.

The game was announced during the Guerrilla Collective Showcase in June 2023 and a gameplay trailer showing the town-building and combat systems followed in August 2023. It released on March 27, 2024, across all platforms simultaneously and a physical Nintendo Switch edition was released by Super Rare Games on May 1, 2025.

== Reception ==
Reception

Aggregate scores
Aggregator	Score
Metacritic	74/100 (NS)
OpenCritic	80/100

Review scores
Publication	Score
RPGFan	85/100
Siliconera	8/10
Nintendo World Report	7/10

Terra Memoria received generally positive reviews. On review aggregator Metacritic, the Nintendo Switch version holds a score of 74/100 based on five critic reviews, indicating "mixed or average". On OpenCritic, the game has a score of 80/100 based on 20 critic reviews, with 79% recommending it.

Sam-James Gordon of RPGFan scored the game 85/100, calling it "a taste of something great" that wrapped up before losing momentum. He praised the pixel art sprites and 3D environments as a convincing tribute to 1990s RPGs and singled out Yponeko's soundtrack of over 80 tracks for its range. Gordon found the randomised combat pairings kept battles from growing stale, though he felt the town-building system lacked purpose since it had no effect on other gameplay systems.

Arielle Haddad of Siliconera gave it an 8/10 and described the art direction as her favourite aspect, comparing the use of 3D to render pixel-style visuals to Octopath Traveler. She found the combat's elemental weakness system familiar to Persona and Final Fantasy but different enough to feel like its own system. Haddad noted that some players might find the game short, but felt its limited scope made it more approachable.

Nintendo World Report's Allyson Cygan considered the turn-cost combat system satisfying to learn, but found that battles became repetitive toward the end, with many attacks functioning too similarly. She preferred the game's setting and background stories to its central narrative and considered the cooking, crafting and town-building systems underdeveloped, scoring it 7/10.

Reviewers differed on the simplicity of the combat. Gordon felt the changing support pairings maintained variety, while Cygan found that attacks became repetitive. Haddad considered the game's relative simplicity suitable for its shorter runtime.
