= Paradigm (video game) =

2017 video game

- Designer: Jacob Janerka
- Composer: Jonas Kjellberg
- Platforms: Linux, macOS, Windows
- Release: April 5, 2017
- Genre: Graphic adventure
- Mode: Single-player

Paradigm is a graphic adventure video game developed by Jacob Janerka. The game has an Eastern European 1970s and 1980s post-apocalyptic look.

== Plot ==
The game follows Paradigm, a genetically grown person that was horribly mutated in the process, who was dumped in a post-Soviet town to grow up on his own. Paradigm then adventures through his past of DUPA Genetics only to find out he is a mutated prodigy child and that he must defeat Olof, a talking sloth who is the head of DUPA Genetics.

== Development ==
The game was crowdfunded through Kickstarter which ended on October 7, 2014, having raised $36,557 AUD by 1,387 backers, 250% over its initial funding goal of $14,000 AUD. To help crowd-fund the project, the game's designer Jacob Janerka quit his job.

== Release ==
Together with the Kickstarter, an alpha demo of the game was available to download and play. The game was originally slated for release in mid-2015.

On August 4, 2016, the game was chosen as one of six winners to be showcased at the PAX Aus Indie Showcase 2016. In March, 2017, a trailer was released on the developer's YouTube channel with a release date reveal of April, 5th, 2017 for Steam and Humble Bundle.

== Reception ==
Reception

Aggregate score
Aggregator	Score
Metacritic	85/100

Review scores
Publication	Score
Adventure Gamers	5/5
Destructoid	9/10
IGN	8.0/10

Reviews for the game were generally positive, with the game currently holding an average score of 85 on Metacritic. Destructoid gave the game a 9 out of 10, praising its offbeat sense of humour, engaging story, distinctive world and diverse characters. IGN gave the game an 8.0 out of 10, praising its voice acting and comedy and saying that it "offers a fresh and memorable entry" for the genre. Press Start gave the game a 9 out of 10, praising its humor, well thought out puzzles, the game's world and for avoiding the tropes of the genre.

Paradigm was one of the winners of the "Australian Game of The Year" award at the 2017 Melbourne International Games Week.
