= Wayward Strand =

2022 adventure game

- Developer: Ghost Pattern
- Publisher: Ghost Pattern
- Platforms: Microsoft Windows; Nintendo Switch; PlayStation 4; PlayStation 5; Xbox One; Xbox Series X/S
- Release: 15 September 2022
- Genre: Adventure
- Mode: Single-player

Wayward Strand is a narrative adventure game by Ghost Pattern. It was released in September 2022 for Microsoft Windows, Nintendo Switch, PlayStation 4 and 5, and Xbox One and Xbox Series X and Series S.

== Gameplay ==
Set in 1978, the player controls 14-year-old Casey Beaumaris, who explores a hospital airship above Victoria, Australia and interact with the residents and staff, while the game world changes in real-time.

== Development ==
The game was developed by Melbourne-based team Ghost Pattern, formed in 2016.

== Reception ==
GamesHub said its exploration of the theme of growing old is heartfelt, while they encountered moments unsure what to do. GamesRadar+ lauded the writing for connecting the "innocence of youth" and "candidness of old age" and compared it to a soap opera.

It won Best Narrative at the Freeplay Independent Games Festival in 2024.
