= Freedom Finger =

2019 video game

- Developer: Wide Right Interactive
- Publishers: Wide Right Interactive; Super Rare Games (Note: (Nintendo Switch, retail)); Limited Run Games (Note: (PlayStation 4, retail))
- Director: Jim Dirschberger
- Producers: Jim Dirschberger; Mark Zorn
- Designer: Jim Dirschberger
- Programmer: Mark Zorn
- Artist: Travis Millard
- Writers: Jim Dirschberger; Mark Melara
- Composer: Aesop Rock
- Engine: Unity
- Platforms: Windows; Switch; PlayStation 4; Xbox One; Mac
- Release: Windows, Switch: WW: September 27, 2019; PS4, Xbox One: WW: March 24, 2020; Mac: WW: August 3, 2020
- Genre: Scrolling shooter
- Mode: Single-player

Freedom Finger is a 2019 horizontally scrolling shooter developed and published by Wide Right Interactive. The game was originally released for Microsoft Windows and Nintendo Switch, and was later ported to PlayStation 4, Xbox One and macOS.

== Gameplay ==
Freedom Finger is a shoot 'em up where players assume the role of a rookie space pilot, Gamma Ray, where they have to rescue a group of kidnapped scientists. Unlike most shmup games, there are options for melee combat. There's also an option to grab enemies and either use them as shield, or using their guns as power-ups.

== Development and release ==
The game was announced for Microsoft Windows and macOS on March 4, 2019. On August 29, 2019, the game got its definitive release date and initial platforms, September 27, 2020, for Microsoft Windows and Nintendo Switch, replacing macOS. On March 10, 2020, PlayStation 4 and Xbox One ports were announced, for a March 24, 2020 release. On August 3, 2020, a macOS port was released. On December 3, 2020, Limited Run Games announced a physical PlayStation 4 physical release with a manual that includes the entire source code for the game, under the BSD-4-Clause license according to its programmer Mark Zorn. The soundtrack for the game was completed by producer and artist Aesop Rock and was released digitally in 2020.

== Reception ==
Reception

Aggregate scores
Aggregator	Score
Metacritic	NS: 74/100; PS4: 82/100; XONE: 78/100
OpenCritic	77% recommend

Review scores
Publication	Score
Nintendo Life	8/10
Shacknews	8/10

Freedom Finger for Nintendo Switch received "Mixed or Average" reviews according to the review aggregation website Metacritic. The PlayStation 4 and Xbox One ports received "generally favorable" reviews. Fellow review aggregator OpenCritic assessed that the game received strong approval, being recommended by 77% of critics. Both Nintendo Life and Shacknews rated it 8/10.
