= The Catacombs of Solaris =

2016 video game

- Steam version header art for Revisited
- Developer: Ian MacLarty
- Platforms: Windows, macOS, Linux
- Release: 2016
- Genre: Adventure
- Mode: Single-player

The Catacombs of Solaris is a 2016 video game by Australian independent developer Ian MacLarty. Described as a "maze that plays with your perception of 3D space on a 2D screen", Catacombs is an art game that exploits the use of perspective to create an illusion of space. Praised for its experimental approach to perception and space, the game won the Freeplay Award at the 2018 Freeplay Independent Games Festival, and was showcased in several art and festival exhibits including by the Australian Centre for the Moving Image. In 2021, a revised version of the game with additional features titled The Catacombs of Solaris Revisited was published by the developer.

== Gameplay ==
A screenshot of The Catacombs of Solaris.

The game is an art game in which players navigate an endless maze of corridors using the directional keys. As the player changes their point of view with the cursor, the colors and patterns on the wall outside their point of view will change to reflect those colors. Whenever players stand still and fix their perspective in a certain direction, the geometry of the interior changes by both reshaping the maze and projecting their previous point of view onto the new walls, creating a disorienting effect. Despite the game's objective being described by MacLarty as "to find your favorite room in the catacombs," the game is an open-ended experience with no exit or end to the game. Revisited contains features additional to the original game, including a number of new visual effects, the ability to load in the player's images, and a built-in screen capture system.

== Development ==
The Catacombs of Solaris was developed by Australian developer Ian MacLarty, a Melbourne-based independent developer prolific for the release of short, experimental games using generative techniques. Developed over the course of one week, MacLarty stated that Catacombs was inspired by the distortion of brand logos on pitch grass at sports games, which are distorted to create the illusion of a two-dimensional form for television broadcast.

=== Exhibition and "Competitive Catacombs" ===
Catacombs was exhibited in several forms, including an event titled Isle of Games at the Art + Games Workshop within IÐNÓ in Reykjavík in April 2018, curated by developer Jonathan van Hove. In partnership with the 2018 Freeplay Independent Games Festival in August 2017, Ian MacLarty presented the game and provided an interview at Contours, an event curated by independent developer Chad Toprak. The game was also exhibited online at the German creative gaming festival PLAY in November 2020 through the interactive online art gallery A MAZE.SPACE, curated by the hosts Initiative Creative Gaming. In 2021, the game was included as part of the Australian Centre for the Moving Image centrepiece exhibition The Story of the Moving Image, which "explores the way that contemporary game developers approach light as both a subject and material of their work."

The game was further exhibited at in Bar SK, a Melbourne-based bar that showcased new and experimental digital media, which led to a live event titled Competitive Catacombs based on the game. This exhibit reinterpreted the game as a competitive esports event in which two players attempt to recreate a prompt image within a time limit, with the resulting visuals in the game judged against the prompt. The concept for the variation originated in part with Nico Disseldorp of independent developer House House, who provided comic prompts whilst watching a person play the game. The exhibition was revived at the 'Bar SK x ACMI Playground' during the event Art After Dark, a Melbourne arts festival held in April 2022.

== Reception ==
=== Critical reception ===
Critics praised The Catacombs of Solaris as an art game that provided unique player experiences with perception and disorientation. Writing for Kotaku, Heather Alexandra stated the game "captures the playfulness of a hall of mirrors and the austerity of a museum," praising it for its "exciting colors and motion." More lukewarm praise was provided by Philippa Warr of Rock Paper Shotgun, who stated that the game was a "curious, well-executed riff on perspective and exploration", whilst critiquing the game for its "disorientation", stating that it induced motion sickness. Danielle Riendeau of Vice described the game as "dizzying at times, forever disorienting, and always intriguing," stating the game was "evocative in the best way" and imbued with "psychedelic" and "alien" qualities. Following MacLarty's prompt of "finding your favorite room" Emma Kidwell of Kill Screen praised the open-ended nature of the experience, stating "I felt free to create whatever experience I wanted", comparing the experience to visiting a museum exhibition.

Several critics praised The Catacombs of Solaris Revisited in reviving attention to the innovative qualities of the original game. Naomi Norbez of Game Curator praised the unsettling tone of the experience, noting that the lack of ambient noise and an exit created a "terrifying, strange madness" to the experience, noting that the game succeeded in its goal to "find an artistic experience, something that speaks to the player." In a follow-up for Rock Paper Shotgun, Emile Reed stated that Revisited was a "contemplative and creative single-player experience," encouraging players to treat playing the game "as a chance to collaborate with some sort of alien environment to make some dazzling visuals." Writing for Eurogamer, Steve Hogarty resonated with the game's "nauseating and claustrophobic experience", stating the game was the "most indoors I've felt since lockdown began" and describing it as "the terrifying sensation of being lost inside an infinite cage that won't stop changing shape."

=== Academic reception ===
The Catacombs of Solaris received attention in the area of digital games scholarship for its innovative qualities. The game was cited as an example of using an algorithm for the "procedural generation of wall surfaces" to create a "spatial trick" that disorients the player's perception of the "overt, immediate visual and spatial realities of the game." Catacombs was described as a "sensing sim", being a video game that "reframes and interrogates sense-perception by stressing novel experiences," blurring the line between aesthetics and mechanics." In constantly manipulating perspective, Catacombs was noted to "break the illusion" of looking around a three-dimensional space, making the illusion "more obvious and palpable by departing from realism (and) detaching visual transformations from the simulated laws of physics." The game was also praised for being part of an "interesting subset of works" that manipulate player perception by using "clever programming tricks" to create non-Euclidean spaces.

=== Accolades ===
The Catacombs of Solaris received the Freeplay Award at the Freeplay Independent Games Festival in May 2018, an Australian independent games event open to Australian independent developers, with the award reflecting the best game selected by the panel of judges.

== Legacy ==
The Catacombs of Solaris led to a creative partnership between MacLarty and Australian poet Gemma Mahadeo, who had met MacLarty at Bar SK and authored a poem based on the exhibition of the game. The resulting collaboration, If We Were Allowed to Visit, was an anthology of poetry arranged digitally by MacLarty, and published in April 2020.
