= Human: Fall Flat =

2016 video game

- Developer: No Brakes Games
- Publishers: Curve Digital; 505 Games (iOS, Android)
- Director: Tomas Sakalauskas
- Producer: Tomas Sakalauskas
- Writer: Tomas Sakalauskas
- Engine: Unity
- Platforms: Windows macOS; Linux; PlayStation 4 Xbox One; Nintendo Switch iOS; Android; Stadia; Xbox Series X/S; PlayStation 5 Nintendo Switch 2
- Release: 22 July 2016: Windows, macOS, Linux; 22 July 2016; PlayStation 4; 9 May 2017; Xbox One; 12 May 2017; Nintendo Switch; 7 December 2017; iOS, Android; 26 June 2019; Stadia; 1 October 2020; Xbox Series X/S; 28 May 2021; PlayStation 5; 24 June 2021; Nintendo Switch 2; 19 March 2026
- Genre: Puzzle-platform
- Modes: Single-player, multiplayer

Human: Fall Flat is a 2016 puzzle-platform game developed by Lithuanian studio No Brakes Games and published by Curve Digital. It was initially released for Microsoft Windows, macOS, and Linux in July 2016, and received ports for PlayStation 4, PlayStation 5, Xbox One, Xbox Series X/S, Nintendo Switch, Google Stadia, and iOS and Android over the next several years and also was released on the Nintendo Switch 2 on 19 March 2026.

The game received mixed reviews from critics, though the replayability of the puzzles and comedic animations were praised. The game has sold more than 58 million copies as of December 2025, making it one of the best selling video games of all-time. A sequel, Human: Fall Flat 2, is in development.

== Gameplay ==
Human: Fall Flat is a physics puzzle game where players play a customizable human, referred to in-game as Bob. Players can make him grab objects and climb up ledges using both his arms and looking with his head.

Bob interacting with a physics object

Although Bob's standard appearance is a featureless, minimalist all-white human with a baseball cap, players are able to customize him to their liking, painting his body in a different array of colors and dressing him in a variety of costumes.

The game is open-ended. Each level is themed differently, each containing multiple solutions to their unique puzzles. Various remotes hidden in the game's early levels cause instructional videos to appear, helping players learn the gameplay and ultimately solve the puzzles.

== Development ==
Human: Fall Flat was developed by Tomas Sakalauskas, founder of Lithuanian studio No Brakes Games. In 2012, Sakalauskas abandoned his work in IT to try video game development. Initially Sakalauskas concentrated on making mobile games although he ran out of money partway through; this, combined with him questioning the ethics of the freemium model of most mobile games, led him instead to turn development towards a PC game. Sakalauskas has stated that Human: Fall Flat was his "last shot at gaming".

The game began life as a prototype for Intel's RealSense motion sensing camera, though Sakalauskas eventually realized that the game would work better with traditional control and transitioned away from the device. Sakalauskas set out to make the game in the vein of a puzzle game similar to Limbo or Portal, however, when playtesting the game with his son Sakalauskas noted that "he did everything possible not to solve puzzles", instead just having fun with the physics engine. This caused Sakalauskas to change his approach and make the puzzles "not really watertight". Initially the game was only single player. Although Sakalauskas received several requests for a multiplayer mode, he felt the physics involved would make online play impossible; however, he eventually formed a solution using technology from Nvidia, and in October 2017, an online multiplayer feature was added, allowing up to eight people to play online or by LAN.

The game was released as a prototype on Itch.io after which many prominent streamers began promoting it, prompting Sakalauskas to release a Steam version nine months later. PlayStation 4 and Xbox One versions followed in May 2017 with a Nintendo Switch version that December. A port to mobile platforms developed by Codeglue and published by 505 Games supporting iOS and Android was released on 26 June 2019. A Stadia port by Lab42 released on 1 October 2020, followed by Xbox Series X/S and PlayStation 5 versions the following year. The game was released on the Nintendo Switch 2 on 19 March 2026.

== Reception ==
Reception

Aggregate scores
Aggregator	Score
Metacritic	PC: 70/100; PS4: 67/100; XONE: 73/100; NS: 65/100
OpenCritic	39% recommend

Review scores
Publication	Score
Destructoid	8/10
Hardcore Gamer	3.5/5
IGN	7.9/10
Nintendo Life	7/10
Nintendo World Report	8/10
Pocket Gamer	3.5/5
Push Square	6/10

=== Critical reception ===
Human: Fall Flat received "mixed or average" reviews, according to review aggregator website Metacritic. Fellow review aggregator OpenCritic assessed that the game received fair approval, being recommended by 39% of critics. Dan Stapleton of IGN recommended the game for watching rather than actually playing, praising the slapstick controls, humorous animations, and character customization. Zack Furniss of Destructoid enjoyed the replayability of the puzzles and praised the multiple solutions each puzzle provided.

=== Sales ===
By February 2018, more than 2 million copies of the game had been sold across all platforms. According to Curve, the sales of the game were boosted with the addition of online multiplayer in late 2017; by early January 2018, the game had broken over 1 million units sold on the Windows version, but within a month, had seen an additional 700,000 sales. By June 2018, the game achieved over 4 million sales across all platforms.

Human: Fall Flat was the first video game released by Super Rare Games, which is a limited-print company that physically publishes Nintendo Switch games. 5,000 copies were made available to order in March 2018. In Japan, the Nintendo Switch version of Human Fall Flat released by Teyon Japan, a subsidiary of Teyon, was the fourteenth best-selling game during its first week of release, with 5,241 copies sold.

As of February 2021, the game had sold more than 25 million copies; part of these sales included the popularity of the game in China over 2020 after being released there through XD Inc and 505 Games, in part due to the game's popularity during the COVID-19 pandemic.

As of March 2023, Human: Fall Flat had sold more than 40 million copies. By January 2025, the game had sold more than 55 million copies. By December of the same year, it reached 58 million copies.

=== Accolades ===
Year	Award	Category	Result	Ref.
2017	Develop Awards	New Games IP	Nominated	
2017	The Independent Game Developers' Association Awards	Casual/Social Game	Nominated	
2017	LT Game Awards 2017	Game of the Year	Won	
2018	The Independent Game Developers' Association Awards	Best Audio Design	Nominated	
2018	The Independent Game Developers' Association Awards	Best Casual Game	Won	

== Sequel ==
In June 2023, Human: Fall Flat 2 was announced to be in development; unlike its predecessor, it is being published by Devolver Digital. It is scheduled for release for Windows and Nintendo Switch 2.
