= Framed (video game) =

2014 video game

- App icon
- Developer: Loveshack Entertainment
- Publishers: Noodlecake Studios (Android), Loveshack Entertainment (iOS, Apple TV)
- Directors: Joshua Boggs, Oliver Browne, Adrian Moore
- Designers: Joshua Boggs, Oliver Browne, Adrian Moore, Stuart Lloyd
- Artists: Oliver Browne, Stuart Lloyd
- Composer: Adrian Moore
- Platforms: iOS, Android, Apple TV
- Release: 12 November 2014
- Genres: Puzzle, Narrative
- Mode: Single-player

Framed (usually styled as FRAMED) is a 2014 puzzle game developed by Australian studio Loveshack Entertainment. The gameplay sees the player re-arranges panels of an animated comic book to change the outcome of the story.

A prequel, Framed 2, was released in 2017. Framed Collection is a compilation of Framed and Framed 2 released later on in 2018 by Fellow Traveller.

== Story ==
A man is on the run from the cops, and barely makes it to an alleyway where he is discovered by the sheriff. The sheriff then tracks down his partner's train ticket and manages to follow her to the secret location, where she is exchanging secrets with the Man. He shoots the man and kills him.

The player swaps the order of the events in order to change the story.

The new outcome is that the sheriff then tracks down the man's partner's train ticket and manages to follow her to the secret location, where she is exchanging secrets, and the Man shoots the sheriff to kill him. The Man is then on the run from the cops, and barely makes it to an alleyway where he is discovered by the woman.

== Gameplay ==
Players take control of morally ambiguous characters as they slink their way across dark alleys and buildings in an effort to avoid the authorities and other obstacles. The goal of the game is to reorganize a series of comic panels so that the protagonist is not caught by the police. In order to accomplish this feat, players must move frames around so that the sequence allows the main character to sneak past, avoid, or knock out their would-be captors.

== Reception ==
Framed

Aggregate score
| Aggregator | Score |
|---|---|
| Metacritic | 85/100 |

Review scores
| Publication | Score |
|---|---|
| Pocket Gamer | 9/10 |
| The Sydney Morning Herald | 9/10 |
| Gamezebo | 4/5 |
| TouchArcade | 3/5 |
| 148Apps | 4.5/5 |
| Apple'n'Apps | 4.5/5 |
| Pocket Tactics | 4.5/5 |

Awards
| Publication | Award |
|---|---|
| IGF China | Excellence in Design |
| Indiecade | Excellence in Visual Design |
| IGF | Finalist - Excellence in Design |
| Kotaku | 2014 Best Australian Game |
| Kotaku | 2014 Best Mobile Game |
| Freeplay | 2013 Best Game |
| Freeplay | 2013 Best Design |
| IMGAwards | 2014 Best Upcoming Game |
| BIG Festival | 2014 Best Narrative |
| Intel Level Up | 2014 Best Puzzle Game |
| PAX Prime | PAX 10 2014 |
| Tokyo Game Show | Sense of Wonder Night 2013 |

As of July 2015, Framed has received over 30 awards and accolades. It has been praised by critics for its "brilliantly simple idea", "pitch perfect" execution, "subtle story telling", "gorgeous visuals", and "finger-snapping music".

In November 2014, Hideo Kojima, creator of the Metal Gear series stated that Framed was his Game of the Year. He praised Framed for its "high sense of gameplay, graphic, & sound", adding, "my best game in this year without any doubt".
