= Stickets =

2013 video game

- App icon
- Developer: Wanderlands
- Publisher: Wanderlands
- Platform: iOS
- Release: May 30, 2013
- Genre: Tile-matching
- Mode: Single-player

Stickets is a 2013 tile-matching game developed and published by the Australian indie studio Wanderlands and released on May 30, 2013, for iOS. The game won the Freeplay Independent Games Festival for Best Australian Game.

== Gameplay ==
The player has to insert L-shaped pieces on a 5-by-5 board.

In Stickets, the player inserts L-shaped three-piece tetrominos in four different orientations on a 5×5 board. Each piece has one yellow, blue, and red block. Grouping three or more of the same colored blocks together makes them disappear, freeing up space. A game over is triggered when the player runs out of space. The game has three separate themes.

== Reception ==
Reception

Aggregate score
Aggregator	Score
Metacritic	87/100

Review scores
Publication	Score
Edge	9/10
Eurogamer	9/10
Gamezebo	90/100
MacLife	4.5/5
Pocket Gamer	3.5/5
TouchArcade	4.5/5
148Apps	4.5/5
Modojo	4.5/5

Stickets has a "generally favorable" rating on Metacritic based on nine critics. The game was included in CNET's best mobile games of the year.

Publications praised the game.

Stickets won the Freeplay Independent Games Festival for Best Australian Game.
