= Great God Grove =

2024 video game

- Developer: LimboLane
- Publishers: LimboLane; Fellow Traveller Games
- Director: Day Lane
- Artist: Yugo Limbo
- Composer: Louie Zong
- Engine: Unity
- Platforms: Microsoft Windows; macOS; Nintendo Switch; Xbox Series X/S
- Release: November 15, 2024
- Genres: Adventure, puzzle
- Mode: Single-player

Great God Grove is a 2024 adventure and puzzle video game developed and published by LimboLane, and co-publishing by LimboLane and Fellow Traveller Games. Players take the role of a human mail carrier known as a Godpoke, tasked with resolving conflicts between bickering deities to prevent an apocalypse.

The game was released on Microsoft Windows, macOS, Nintendo Switch, and Xbox on November 15, 2024. A physical Nintendo Switch edition was released by Super Rare Games on August 7, 2025. The game received generally positive reviews, with critics highlighting its visual style, writing and speech-bubble puzzle mechanic.

== Gameplay ==
Great God Grove is a puzzle-adventure game set in a 2.5D world, combining 2D hand-drawn characters with 3D environments. Players control a nameless protagonist known as the Godpoke, who is deputised by Inspekta, the God of Leadership, to deliver mail and resolve disputes across several zones of the grove. Each zone is home to one or two gods, who have been thrown into conflict by a series of inflammatory letters sent by King, the God of Communication.

The central mechanic revolves around the Megapon, a megaphone-shaped device that allows the player to vacuum up speech bubbles from characters and store up to five at a time. These captured lines of dialogue can then be fired at other characters to provoke reactions, deliver messages or solve puzzles. Some interactions require lateral thinking; a phrase spoken metaphorically by one character may need to be applied literally to another. The Megapon can also be used to collect physical objects, which occupy the same shared inventory as captured dialogue.

The game is divided into a series of self-contained zones, each presenting a distinct puzzle scenario tied to the god or gods who inhabit it. Between zones, the player navigates short combat sequences. Great God Grove also features live-action puppet vignettes interspersed throughout the game.

== Development ==
Great God Grove was developed by LimboLane, a two-person studio consisting of designer Day Lane and animator Yugo Limbo. The studio previously released Smile for Me (2019), a nod-and-shake adventure game in which players communicated exclusively through head gestures. Great God Grove was announced in June 2022 as LimboLane's next project. Writing for Rock Paper Shotgun in April 2024, Alice Bell noted that the studio's visual style remained distinctive across both titles, particularly its use of puppets in cutscenes.

The game was built in the Unity engine. The 3D god characters were designed by Yugo Limbo, modelled by Day Lane in Blender, and animated by Jack Cornish. Sound effects were created by Tony McVaney, and the soundtrack was composed by Louie Zong. The game was released on Microsoft Windows, macOS, Nintendo Switch, and Xbox on November 15, 2024, published by Fellow Traveller. A physical Nintendo Switch edition was released by Super Rare Games on August 7, 2025.

== Reception ==
Reception

Aggregate scores
Aggregator	Score
Metacritic	81/100
OpenCritic	76/100

Review scores
Publication	Score
Destructoid	85/100
GamesRadar+	3.5/5 stars
Checkpoint Gaming	6.5/10
Adventure Game Hotspot	90/100

Great God Grove received generally positive reviews from critics. On review aggregator Metacritic, the game holds a score of 81/100 based on six critic reviews for the PC version, indicating "generally favorable reviews". On OpenCritic, the game holds a Top Critic Average of 76/100 based on eight reviews, with 57% of critics recommending it.

Zoey Handley of Destructoid scored the game 85/100 and was particularly taken with its visual style, noting the range of character poses and expressions. She found the first area's puzzle logic initially unclear, but felt the game's design language became intuitive from the second zone onward. Oscar Taylor-Kent of GamesRadar+ rated it 3.5/5 and found the speech bubble mechanic consistently engaging, with several inventive puzzles. He felt the game's strongest moments came in its earlier zones, with later areas proving comparatively straightforward.

Omi Koulas of Checkpoint Gaming was less enthusiastic, giving the game 6.5/10. While he acknowledged its charm and originality, he criticised what he described as clunky mechanics and a straightforward narrative. Sam Amiotte-Beaulieu of Adventure Game Hotspot scored it 90/100, praising the eclectic cast of characters and the distinct musical identity of each zone across its six-to-eight-hour runtime.

Rachel Watts of Rock Paper Shotgun praised the game's art style, writing and puppet work, and described its surrealist themes as addressing power, censorship, idol worship and the fear of being forgotten, concluding that it was one of the most ambitious games of 2024. Leigh Woosey of Siliconera found the game creative in its approach to puzzles, singling out moments in which metaphorical phrases had to be applied literally, and concluded that it was a compelling exploration of the importance of good communication.
