= Grotto (video game) =

2021 video game

- Developer(s): Brainwash Gang
- Publisher(s): Digerati
- Platform(s): Windows
- Release: October 26, 2021
- Genre(s): Walking simulator
- Mode(s): Single-player

Grotto is a walking simulator video game developed by Brainwash Gang and published by Digerati. It was released on October 26, 2021 for Windows. The game takes place in a mysterious unnamed fantasy world in which the player is an anonymous astrologer, or "Startamer", who moves into a mountain cave. The player is then pulled into the internal affairs of the Brute tribe as its members come to them for guidance, eventually becoming a trusted figure who is able to influence certain events through their prophecies. The game was praised by reviewers for its story and artwork, but the repetitiveness and simplicity of its gameplay, as well as its linearity, was criticized.

== Gameplay ==
The game consists entirely of walking around a single cave with two rooms; one is a meeting hall with a campfire where the player speaks with visitors, while the other is an inner sanctum containing the player's tent and tools. The inner room also has a window from which the player can draw constellations in the stars, which are recorded as usable symbols on the cave wall attached to cryptic descriptions. These symbols can then be brought to people to deliver a prophecy, functioning as the game's vague choice process. Over time, the symbols grow dim through repeated use, and their power must be replenished. The player also gains several additional hint tools over the course of the game - the Chief's bones, which can be thrown over a sigil to commune with him in the afterlife, a stringed instrument that delivers sinister messages, and a smoking pipe that allows the player to commune with deceased spirits via a trance.

== Plot ==
The game takes place entirely within a deep mountain cave, in an unnamed pre-industrial world populated solely by anthropomorphic animals. The player experiences visual and aural hallucinations of a mysterious female voice, who speaks in past tense as the story's narrator. The player first meets Ouuch, a crass toad who claims to be the nearby village's chief and asks for a prophecy. This is soon revealed to be a sham, and he is captured by warriors of the village's tribe, the Brutes. The Brutes, internally referred to as "The People", distrust those who use proper names, only naming things by their traits, such as calling their village "The Place We Live In". They practice strict population control due to the harsh environment, sacrificing children who do not gain a useful skill. Mating is prohibited on most days, besides with the Love Twins, actually a single polycephalic giraffe. The real chief asks the player which form of torture to impose on Ouuch. He survives the torture, and vows to get revenge on the player and the Brutes.

The sudden death of the Chief from a terminal illness sends the village into turmoil. Two Brutes come to the player vying to become the next Chief, the First Hunter, a stag and former lieutenant of the Chief who wishes to carry on village traditions, and the Chief's widow Good-For-Nothing, a cobra who was once granted mercy by the Chief despite her lack of skills, and wishes to reform the tribe. Regardless of the player's selection, the village splits into two halves, each led by their respective Chief. The tensions finally erupt into open conflict, causing the village's prized Ceremonial Tree to burn down and sapping the power of the constellations. The survivors are forced to rebuild, slowly giving meaning back to the stars using a potion created from the tree remains. Just as it seems this has succeeded, an army of heavily armored bugs known as the Red Plates invades, drawn by a magical instrument given to the player by an unwitting merchant. They begin to indoctrinate the Brutes, forcing them to worship the twisted Red Gods, and making the player choose which rebellious villager will be sacrificed. Ouuch assists the Red Plates as their translator, but grows to detest their cruelty; he is caught trying to escape and killed.

The Red Plates condemn the player to death by sealing them inside their cave, but the player is saved by a miner. Using the miner's pick, they reveal that the mountain is alive and the source of their hallucinations, part of a dying race of ancient entities hunted down by the Red Plates to steal their magic. If they choose to leave the mountain alive, she thanks the player for saving her, but the Brutes are conquered completely. If they choose to destroy the mountain's heart, the mountain says it is only natural they would sacrifice her, and her released magic summons back various tribespeople who had fled the village, after which they express regret for having done so. In a sneak attack, they slay the Red Plate leaders, and the rest are killed in the ensuing insurrection. In gratitude, the Brutes let the player give them a new name, and then invite them outside as a member of the tribe.

== Reception ==
Grotto was positively received by critics. Catharine Castle of Rock Paper Shotgun called its story a "compelling, ongoing tale of multiple power struggles, clashes of ideas and how to live a good and meaningful life in a small, close-knit community", saying that she was "hooked from start to finish", but described the constant back and forth of the cave as making the game feel tedious. She also criticized the game's relative linearity, making repeat playthroughs uninteresting. However, she praised the game for making her think deeply about words and language even despite the inconsequential nature of her choices. Mattia Pescitelli of Multiplayer.it wrote that it was difficult to empathize with individual characters due to a lack of character development and the game's short length, also noting the player's "minimal control" over events and the fact that discovering the constellations was entirely up to chance. However, he praised the game's visuals and soundtrack as "spectacular", and far better than the gameplay. Manu Delgado of Vandal called the game "written with exquisite taste" and described the artwork as "breathtaking", calling it a "truly unique game", but lamenting that it had not been translated into Spanish. Cosmin Vasile of Softpedia said that he enjoyed the game's ambiguity and presentation, but criticized its overall lack of replay value.
