= Blud (video game) =

2024 video game

#BLUD
- Developer: Exit 73 Studios
- Publisher: Humble Games
- Programmers: Cody Greenhalge; Andrew Tavis
- Artists: Chris Burns; Bob Fox
- Writer: Greg Lane
- Engine: Unity
- Platforms: Windows, Nintendo Switch, PlayStation 4, PlayStation 5, Xbox One, Xbox Series X/S
- Release: June 18, 2024
- Genres: Action-adventure, dungeon crawler
- Mode: Single-player

#BLUD is a 2024 action-adventure dungeon crawler developed by Exit 73 Studios and published by Humble Games. Players control Becky Brewster, a teenage vampire hunter navigating high school life while battling an undead invasion in the fictional town of Carpentersville.

The game features hand-drawn 2D animation inspired by late-1990s and early-2000s Cartoon Network shows. It was released on 18 June 2024 for Microsoft Windows, Nintendo Switch, PlayStation 4, PlayStation 5, Xbox One and Xbox Series X/S. Critics praised the art direction and writing but found the combat mechanics lacking in depth.

== Gameplay ==
#BLUD is a top-down action-adventure game in which the player controls Becky Brewster across interconnected maps covering a school campus, the surrounding town and underground dungeons.

Becky fights primarily with a field hockey stick, which can be upgraded over the course of the game. New enemy types and weapon upgrades are introduced across the game's progression, with combat built around melee attacks and a dodge roll.

A central feature is Perch, a fictional social media application that serves as both a quest tracker and a narrative device. Missions and side quests appear as posts on the platform, and players can take selfies at specific locations to analyze enemy weaknesses. The selfie mechanic also fleshes out the game's cast of characters, with non-player characters commenting on each photo.

== Development ==
Exit 73 Studios had previously produced animation for clients including Nickelodeon, Cartoon Network and Disney XD. #BLUD was originally conceived as a pitch for an animated television series. Co-founders Chris Burns and Bob Fox had developed concept art and a short trailer during downtime between client projects, with the idea dating back to at least 2018.

The idea took a different turn when programmer Cody Greenhalge saw the pitch materials and suggested the concept would work better as a video game. The team formed Exit 73 Games as a separate entity, bringing on Greenhalge and fellow programmer Andrew Tavis alongside writer Greg Lane.

Development spanned roughly seven years from that early trailer to release. Burns cited The Powerpuff Girls and the work of animator Craig McCracken as key visual influences. The game's animation was produced using traditional hand-drawn techniques rather than the skeletal rigs common in 2D games.

Humble Games announced a publishing partnership with Exit 73 Studios in May 2023. The game was released on 18 June 2024 across PC and consoles. A content update titled "Claws for Alarm" was released after launch. Super Rare Games later produced a limited physical release for the Nintendo Switch version.

== Reception ==
Reception

Aggregate scores
Aggregator	Score
Metacritic	PC: 73/100; PS4: 72/100; XONE: 75/100
OpenCritic	73/100

Review scores
Publication	Score
Push Square	7/10
Siliconera	8/10

#BLUD received mixed to positive reviews upon release. On Metacritic, the game holds aggregate scores of 73/100 on PC, 75 on Xbox One and 72 on PlayStation 4. On OpenCritic, it has a top critic average of 73/100 based on 31 reviews, with 43% of critics recommending it.

The visual presentation drew widespread praise. Push Square called the aesthetic "superbly realized" and noted it could carry the experience on its own. Siliconera likened the tone to a fun Saturday morning adventure, pointing to genuine laughs throughout the script.

Push Square acknowledged that boss battles were a highlight but found regular combat slow to develop. They also felt the objectives were vague at times, with a reliance on fetch quests in the game's side content.

Zack Zwiezen of Kotaku praised the game's trailer, writing that the game's "impressive style makes up for some annoying jank and boss fights" and that the game perfectly recreates a "late '90s animated look".
