= Old School Musical =

2018 video game

- Developer: La Moutarde
- Publisher: Playdius
- Director: François Bertrand
- Artist: Anthony Expert
- Composers: Yponeko; Dubmood; Zabutom; Hello World; Le Plancton
- Engine: Unity
- Platforms: Windows; Nintendo Switch; iOS; Android
- Release: September 13, 2018
- Genres: Rhythm, adventure
- Modes: Single-player, multiplayer

Old School Musical is a rhythm adventure game developed by La Moutarde and published by Playdius. It has pixel art visuals and a chiptune soundtrack, taking inspiration from classic 8-bit and 16-bit games. The story follows brothers Tib and Rob as they try to save the universe from glitches. Players must press buttons in time with the music according to the on-screen sequence to progress through each level. The game was released for Nintendo Switch and Windows on September 13, 2018. Old School Musical: Pocket Edition, a version including only the Chicken Republic gamemode, was released for iOS and Android in 2019.

== Gameplay ==
Old School Musical is a rhythm game in which the player must progress the main characters, Tib and Rob, through each level by correctly timing inputs. Each note flows towards the center of the screen from one of four directions. The corresponding button must be pressed as the note eclipses the circle in the center of the screen. Missing or getting poor timing on a note drains from the player's HP bar. Correctly timing notes will increase the fury bar. When the fury bar is full, each consecutive successful note will refill the player's HP.

== Plot ==
Brothers Tib and Rob have spent their entire lives on an island with their strict and cruel mother. One day, while heading home, they notice their world beginning to be destroyed by glitches, and their mother is nowhere to be found. She has left behind a strange remote, and a letter saying to "meet [her] at the communication tower". After defending themselves from the attacking glitches, the brothers use the remote, which opens a portal to a space station. They use the space station to travel to several other worlds, searching for the communication tower. They don't find it, however, and each of these worlds begin glitching shortly after the brothers arrive, forcing them to leave.

Eventually, Tib and Rob visit a post-apocalyptic world known as Arckhania, where they find the tower and meet their mother on the top floor. Mother reveals that this is the world her and the brothers are originally from. She also tells the brothers that the letter that guided them here contained a virus, placed there as part of her evil plan. By carrying the letter, Tib and Rob have been spreading the glitches, causing the worlds they visited to be corrupted and destroyed. The Arckhanian "heart of the Internet" is infected, and begins spreading glitches throughout all universes. Mother tries to blow up the brothers, but they escape the tower using a spaceship.

Tib and Rob receive a telepathic message from a sage named Cloche-Pied. They travel to Cloche-Pied's world, where he shows them a temple with a mural depicting the two brothers as legendary heroes, destined to save the universe from a being called "the shadow". After retrieving a magic key from an imprisoned elf in the Chicken Republic, Tib and Rob open the temple's portal to the Shadow World. They are faced with their mother, who says that her real name is Xelivad, and that she is the shadow that destroyed Arckhania long ago. Xelivad explains that she adopted Tib and Rob after destroying the colony of survivors where their true parents lived. In a face-off with the shadow, the brothers zap Xelivad with their teleporter remote, which ultimately defeats her.

With the shadow gone and the glitches stopped, Tib and Rob decide to stay in the village in Cloche-Pied's world and enjoy their new, peaceful life.

== Development ==
Development began in 2011 under the title 8Bit The Musical. Director François Bertrand was a fan of both rhythm games and retro games, and chose to make a game of his own that would reflect that. Bertrand said "The idea was to make a rhythm game that is both fun to play and nice to watch", and he compared the original gameplay concept to the Project Diva series. After years of work, development was paused due to the challenges of developing with Microsoft XNA. All code and assets were scrapped, and the game was rebuilt in Unity. During the last year of development, the gameplay was changed from the aforementioned Project Diva-like display, to a format where all of the buttons come to the center of the screen. When the game was almost finished, the developers found that they had dozens of songs they weren't able to fit into the main story. To make up for this, 2-3 months were dedicated to development of the post-game "Chicken Republic" mode.

=== Release ===
Old School Musical was released for Nintendo Switch and Windows on September 13, 2018.

Toricity, a free DLC containing 5 new levels with music composed by TORIENA, was released on November 7, 2019.

Old School Musical: Pocket Edition was officially launched for iOS and Android on December 10, 2019.

MV Expo, a free DLC containing 5 new levels with music composed by Xavier Dang, was released on June 25, 2020.

A physical edition of the game was given a limited release by Super Rare Games on July 30, 2020. The physical release included all DLC, as well as a game manual, stickers, and trading cards based on the game.

== Reception ==
Reception

Aggregate scores
Aggregator	Score
Metacritic	Switch: 76/100
OpenCritic	50% recommend

Review scores
Publication	Score
Nintendo World Report	7/10
Shacknews	7/10
Nintendojo	A-

Old School Musical received "generally favorable" reviews according to review aggregator Metacritic. Nintendo World Report gave the game a 7/10 rating and complimented the well-built gameplay, but criticized the music and story as being forgettable. Shacknews similarly called the story mode "painful" to get through, but praised the soundtrack and post-story challenge mode. A review published by Polygon found Old School Musical to be a "basic but fun" experience beyond its disordered retro game references.
