= Paperbark (video game) =

2018 video game

- Developer: Paper House
- Publisher: Paper House
- Platforms: Microsoft Windows; macOS; iOS
- Release: 21 June 2018
- Genre: Point-and-click

Paperbark is an Australian point-and-click exploration video game by Paper House, released June 2018.

== Development ==
The game was originally created as the final year project of RMIT game design students Ryan Boulton (programmer), Nina Bennett (artist) and Terry Burdak, who founded the indie development studio Paper House. They wanted the game to look like a storybook, and used Boulton's work as he had already been developing watercolour-inspired rendering techniques. Burdak suggested the inspiration of children's books. The trio grew up in regional Victoria, and aimed to make a game that looked like the places they knew. The watercolour art style is reminiscent of nature-centric Australian children's books like Blinky Bill, Diary of a Wombat and Possum Magic. Reflecting on their time at RMIT, Burdak explained: "“It has a supportive community, which allowed us to experiment and create a game that explores our personal ideas about Australia and story-telling in a digital format."

After graduating from university, they showed an early prototype to different gaming conferences, and discovered the government organization Film Victoria, which offers funding to game development, among other creative projects. After securing a Film Victoria grant in 2015, the team could quit their day jobs, form a company, and devote their time to finishing the game. They brought on various freelancers, including an ecologist who checked if the various plants and animals were native to the bush. The team also hired a children's book author (whose identity is currently kept secret) in order to elevate the narrative elements of the game.

== Plot and gameplay ==
The plot centres around a sleepy wombat exploring Australian bushland, encountering various flora and fauna along the way.

Players tap the screen to move the character, and as they do more pieces of the path are made visible. According to Gamasutra, "information unfolds on screen in curt but elegantly simple sentences".

== Critical reception ==
Mashable felt the game offers a "more detailed representation of the Australian bush than we've seen in other games", comparing it to Forza Horizon 3 which showcased the deserts, rainforests and coastlines that are more commonly portrayed. Finder deemed its art style as both "striking" and "impressive". The ABC noted that while Australian developers have often struggled to create games that are "quintessentially Australian", Paperbark offers an exception to the rule. Pixel Pop Network likened the game's storytelling through visuals to children's books like Animalia, Bamboozled, and Where's Wally. Kotaku singled out the game when discussing a video game project that is unconcerned with money, instead having a sole goal to present honest representation of an Australian landscape. Speaking of the game's educational potential, Gamasutra suggested its application as a teaching aid in a kindergarten or early primary school biology class.

=== Awards and nominations ===
The game was a student entrant in the 2016 Independent Games Festival. Paperbark won the award for "Best Open-Genre Game" at Intel Level Up 2017. It was also nominated for "Australian Developed Game of the Year" at the Australian Games Awards 2018.
