= Escape from Ever After =

- Developers: Sleepy Castle Studio, Wing-It! Creative
- Publisher: HypeTrain Digital
- Composer: Daniel Whitworth
- Platforms: Nintendo Switch; PlayStation 5; Windows; Xbox Series X/S
- Release: January 23, 2026
- Genre: Role-playing
- Mode: Single-player

Escape from Ever After is a 2026 role-playing video game co-developed by Sleepy Castle Studio and Wing-It! Creative, and published by HypeTrain Digital. Taking inspiration from the early Paper Mario games, it follows Flynt Buckler, a fairytale hero who discovers that his storybook world has been taken over by Ever After Inc., a corporation from the real world, and infiltrates the company as an employee to dismantle it from within. The game was released on January 23, 2026, for Nintendo Switch, PlayStation 5, Windows, and Xbox Series X and Series S.

Developed primarily by a two-person team, the game was crowdfunded on Kickstarter in 2022 under the title Flynt Buckler Wakes the Sleepy Castle before being retooled and renamed during its development. It received generally favorable reviews from critics, who praised its humor, writing, and combat while comparing it to the Paper Mario series.

== Gameplay ==
The game features 2D characters in 3D environments, similar to the Paper Mario series.

Escape from Ever After is a turn-based role-playing game with real-time elements, inspired by the early Paper Mario games. The player controls Flynt in 2D exploration and platforming sequences. Flynt can run, jump, and throw his shield to solve puzzles, and initiate encounters and combat with enemies. Party members recruited during the story have abilities which can be used to interact with the environment and open new areas, such as the dragon Tinder's fire breath and the wolf Wolfgang's songs to progress in the game. Tinder's castle, converted into the headquarters of Ever After Inc., serves as a hub world that gradually opens up as the story progresses.

== Plot ==
Flynt Buckler, a classic fairytale adventurer, storms the castle of his dragon nemesis Tinder, only to find the fortress has been converted into corporate offices and the dragon is missing. The castle has become the headquarters of Ever After Inc., a conglomerate from the real world that has begun exploiting storybook worlds for their resources and cheaper labor. After learning that the company has imprisoned Tinder and put the realm's inhabitants to work in corporate jobs, Flynt takes a job with Ever After Inc. and together with Tinder and others that he meets during his journey, works to climb the corporate ladder and sabotage the company from within.

== Development ==
Escape from Ever After was developed by Sleepy Castle Studio, a two-person indie game development team, consisting of Ryan Kitner and Daniel Whitworth. A Kickstarter campaign launched in late 2022 under the game's original title, Flynt Buckler Wakes the Sleepy Castle, concluded on December 1, 2022, having raised CA$95,565, more than doubling its $40,000 goal. The game was published by HypeTrain Digital.

== Reception ==
Reception

Aggregate scores
Aggregator	Score
Metacritic	(PC) 82/100 (PS5) 69/100 (NS) 80/100
OpenCritic	86% recommend (Note: Based on 35 reviews)

Review scores
Publication	Score
Nintendo Life	8/10 (Switch)
RPGamer	3.5/5
RPGFan	73%

The game received "generally" favorable reviews, and has an 82% on Metacritic based on 13 reviews. Several critics compared the game to the Paper Mario series in their reviews.

RPGFan's Neal Chandran felt that the writing and gameplay were well done, but criticized the game's "mushy" controls, especially in its puzzle and platform sections. Chandran felt it was "a middle-of-the-road" Paper Mario experience because of these issues. Nintendo Life's Mitch Vogel argued that the game came together extremely well, but felt that the game was too short at about 20 hours. RPG Gamer's Sam Wachter echoed Chandran's complaints about the platform and puzzle sections, but called it a "genuinely fun game", recommending that people give it a chance. Wachter also praised the game's soundtrack as a "complete bop." Polygon's Marloes Valentina Stella also praised the soundtrack, and described the game as having the best parts of both Paper Mario and The Wolf Among Us.
