= Jolly Rover =

2010 graphic adventure video game

- Developer: Brawsome
- Publisher: Brawsome
- Designer: Andrew Goulding
- Platforms: Cloud (OnLive); Mac OS X; Microsoft Windows
- Release: June 8, 2010
- Genre: Graphic adventure
- Mode: Single-player

Jolly Rover is a 2D graphic adventure game developed by Australian studio Brawsome. The game was released in early 2010 for the PC, distributed digitally.

The game takes place in an 18th-century pirate setting in which all of the characters are dogs. The game's story revolves around a sausage dog named Gaius James Rover, who is kidnapped by a crew of pirates, before becoming a pirate himself. The game play, characters, and story are comparable to the Monkey Island series, which the game makes multiple references to.

== Gameplay ==
Jolly Rover is a traditional point-and-click adventure game in which players control the character of Gaius James Rover. The player must explore a range of environments, and solve a series of puzzles in order to progress through the game. The majority of the game's controls are performed with the use of the cursor, as the player uses Gaius to travel through different environments, pick up items, combine items, examine objects and converse with various non-playable characters.

At the beginning of the game, Gaius meets and befriends a parrot by the name of Juan Leon. The character of Juan Leon doubles as a hint system throughout the game, as Gaius may ask Juan questions in order to receive subtle hints. The player may also use Gaius to feed Juan crackers in order to receive increasingly stronger hints from the parrot.

== Plot ==
The game is focused on a young and naive British Dachshund named Gaius James Rover who is sailing across the seas to deliver a cargo of Jolly Rover, a brew made of rum spoiled by tobacco to governor Guy DeSilver residing on Groggy Island, a small backwater and haven for pirates. However, James is quickly captured by pirates led by Captain Howell who is the first one to give him the nickname and titular name Jolly Rover.

After three weeks in capture, James Rover manages to escape and disguises himself and meets Juan Leon the Parrot, a wisecracking animal sidekick that would serve as the hint system for the game progress. But Jame finds that they have already arrived at Groggy Island and captain Howell simply orders him to roar him into shore.

James tries to confront Governor DeSilver and accuses captain Howell for trying his cargo but Howell denies it and settles the arrangements with delivering the same cargo of rum that he stole from James. DeSilver then proceeds to threaten a rather desperate and reluctant James to settle the debt of 50 pieces-of-eights by paying him 5 pieces per month or be put in jail and most likely hanged. James agrees the terms reluctantly and is recruited by captain Howell to be their ship cook for making up for the incident and that James disposed of their previous cook earlier.

During his quest to make "Salamagundi", a favored salad dish for the pirates, James is given by a Dalmatian retired pirate a guide book on Voodoo which will be very useful for the game such as Raise the Dead, Voices of the Dead, Scare Beast and Heat Iron. He also learns that DeSilver was a notorious pirate hunter who betrayed his own brother privateer later known as the legendary pirate Captain Silvereye, the nickname being that he used an eye patch with a silver coin attached to it. After Captain Silvereye mysteriously disappeared, DeSilver semi retired and became governor of Groggy Island, controlling the blackmarket trade with an iron fist. To make matters worse, James sneaks into his office and it is accidentally revealed that the corrupt governor is in league with a sinister voodoo priest by supplying him with human sacrifices (or rather dog sacrifices in this case) in exchange for immortality.

James completes his task by making the salad dish to the pirates and they have a round of rum. Though reluctant, James toasts his share of rum with the pirates but being extremely light headed, James promptly faints after only one drink.

During a dream flashback, it is revealed that when he was a young pup, Jame's father was a famous clown working for a circus and that the young pup promised to have his very own circus one day. James' father proudly encourages his sick son to sleep and walks off to work where it is highly suggested that it was the very same night where James' father was tragically comedic killed from a blow to the groin from an improperly loaded joke cannon.

James Rover wakes up on Cannibal Island dumped by captain Howell as a distraction to the supposedly cannibals who lives there. However the cannibals is revealed to be an all-female pirate crew led by captain Marianne posing as cannibals to either kill or scare off any intruders, males specially. James disguises and infiltrates the camp where he meets a female cocker spaniel and love interest Clara DeSilver, the daughter of Captain Silvereye.

The two team up to escape the island since Clara no longer desires to be with her previous crew and arrives to a labyrinth cave where her father's ship The Red Herring is hidden but none of them can really find it. But James uses his voodoo book to hear the ghostly voices and uses it to guide themselves to the ship, but none of them can really sail a ship since the ship needs a crew and James is the son of a clown. James uses the Raise the Dead spell and summons the spirit of Captain Silvereye who takes the ship to Shipwreck Island, Clara's family home.

Guided by the pirate ghost, Clara and James arrive to her home where they find that Clara's ghostly father has finally put into rest near her mother's grave. Clara decides to rest in her room up in the tree house while James Rover decides to search for the treasure that captain Silvereye left behind. After a series of puzzles, James finally reaches his goal but the evil governor DeSilver has followed him behind, intent to kidnap Clara for his own evil purposes. James finally embraces his destiny as Jolly Rover the Pirate and challenges DeSilver... Only to get a sword handle delivered to his head which knocks him out.

Oddly enough while he is passed out, James receives a spiritual guidance by his father who states how proud he is with his son even though James regretted to never fulfill his promise to have his own circus while they pass juggling balls to each other. When James asks his father what to do next, he simply says "think fast!" and knocks James out and softly says to him to wake up.

James wakes up and finds himself on a very small island with a simple palm tree and an empty barrel and a hangman's knot. But James manages to lure a sea turtle and ties it to the barrel with the rope and he runs off back to Groggy Island to save Clara from DeSilver and the voodoo priest.

James infiltrates the secret cave via the governors office where DeSilver is trying to perform a voodoo ritual over to Clara with the voodoo priest but James simply walks in confident, juggling with some red balls. Distracting DeSilver by shouting "Think fast!", James throws one of his red balls on a very confused DeSilver who stumbles over the voodoo priest and they both fall over the cliff into a pit of hot boiling water. James rescues Clara, but the volcano starts to increase the hot water. James quickly manages to build up a balloon (though he calls it a Jolly Floater) by using the hot steam and they both fly off just before the steam erupts. They are followed by a shape that looks like DeSilver before he disappeared into the steam.

James and Clara looks across the sea and witnesses a glorious sunset. The balloon flies from the screen and the credits rolls right after Jolly Rover exclaims "Oh my!" at Clara's subtle proposal to further develop their romantic relationship.

== Reception ==
Reception

Aggregate scores
Aggregator	Score
GameRankings	76.35%
Metacritic	71 out of 100

Review score
Publication	Score
Adventure Gamers	3.5 out of 5

Though the game was met with little response, the feedback that it did gain was generally positive. One reviewer citing it as "strong and original" and stating that it "brings some interesting new ideas to the point-and-click adventure genre."

It was given a Metascore of 71, based on 15 reviews , and a GameRankings score of 76.35% based on 13 reviews.

Video game talk show Good Game's two presenters gave the game an 8 and 7 out of 10 calling it "a nice short and sweet experience" as well featuring amusing gameplay.
