= Melbourne International Games Week =

Melbourne International Games Week is the largest game professional and consumer communication and networking platform in Asia Pacific, hosted by Creative Victoria. It comprises a confluence of events for three areas of interest, business, consumer and industry.

== History ==
MIGW 2015 had over 60,000 attendees participating in game developer conferences and consumer shows across the city, including Game Connect Asia Pacific, Unite Melbourne, PAX Australia, Freeplay Independent Games Festival's Parallels showcase, the Women in Games Lunch, Australian Game Developers’ Awards, ACMI Family Day, VR and Serious Games Festival and the Education in Games Summit.

2016's MIGW events were held in close proximity in a number of venues, including the Australian Centre for the Moving Image and the Melbourne Convention and Exhibition Centre. More than 65,000 people attended in 2017.

The 2018 MIGW programme also includes a number of new events, including the first Melbourne Queer Games Festival focusing on games with LGBT content, an e-sports conference, and the new High Score Conference exploring the relationship between games and music.

With the advent of COVID 19, MIGW changed to an online format in 2020-21, featuring interactive events from ACMI, Gamer Cirls and MIGW at the Table, a 12-hour TTRPG gaming and streaming event.

The Australian Game Developer Awards, hosted by the Interactive Games and Entertainment Association (IGEA) since 2020, are held as part of the event, presenting awards to Australian and New Zealand game developers.
