= Richard Lemarchand =

Writer and game designer

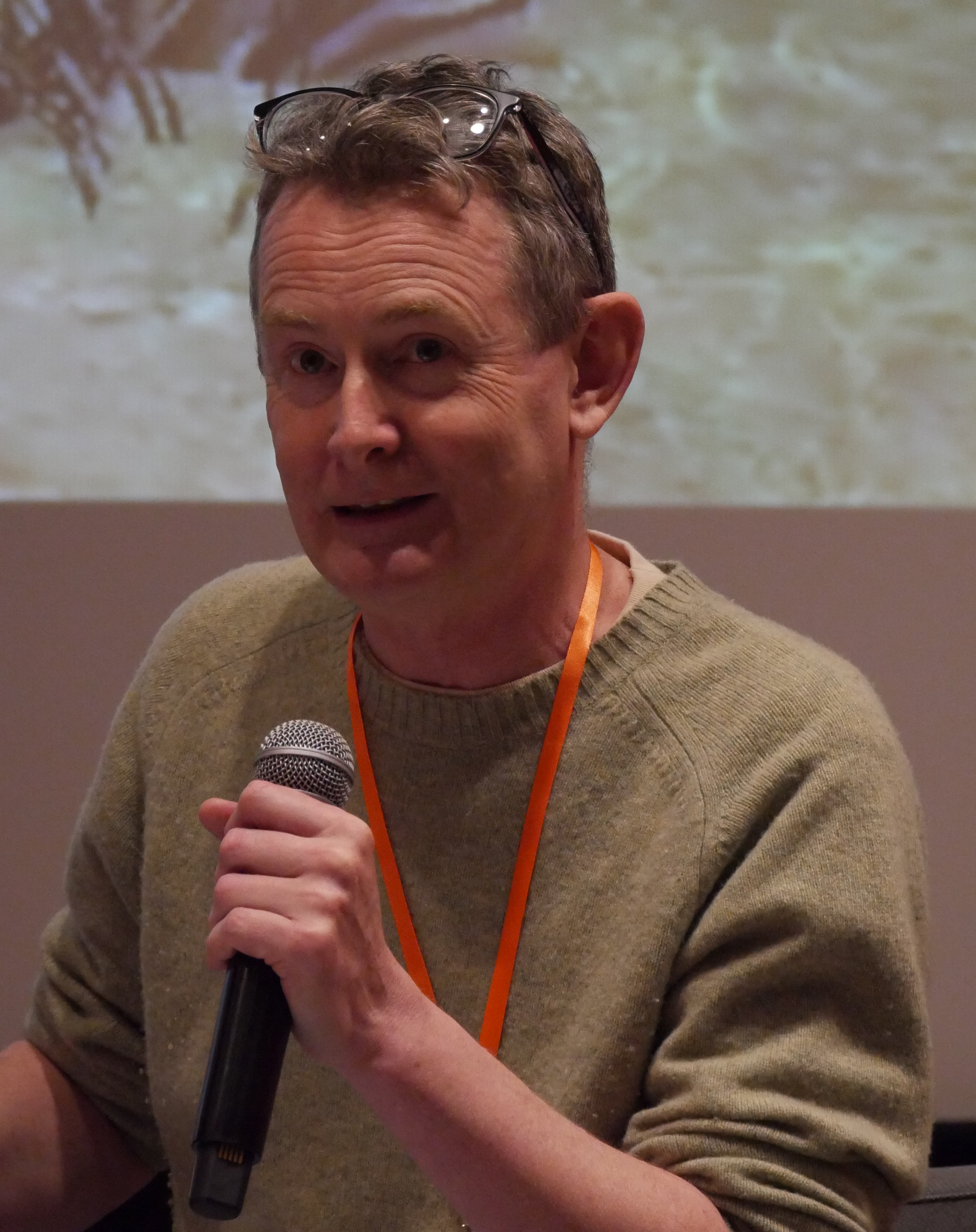
- Born: England
- Education: Physics & Philosophy, University of Oxford
- Occupations: Game designer, associate professor
- Website: richardlemarchand.com

Richard Lemarchand is a game designer, educator, and author. He is known for his work as a lead designer on the Uncharted video game series from Naughty Dog.

== Game Design ==
After graduating from Balliol College, Oxford University with a B.A. Hons in physics and philosophy, in 1991 Lemarchand began work as a game designer at the British studio of American company MicroProse.

In 1995, Lemarchand became a senior game designer at Crystal Dynamics, where he worked on the Gex and Pandemonium! series and later the Legacy of Kain: Soul Reaver series with Amy Hennig.

He joined Naughty Dog in 2004, where he worked on Jak 3 and Jak X: Combat Racing, and he was the lead or co-lead designer for the three Uncharted games for PlayStation 3. He left Naughty Dog in 2012 after eight years.

== Academics ==
Since 2012, Lemarchand has been an associate professor in the Interactive Media & Games Division at the University of Southern California School of Cinematic Arts.

== A Playful Production Process ==
In October 2021, Lemarchand's book A Playful Production Process: For Game Designers (and Everyone) was published by MIT Press. The book discusses the integration of game design and game project management processes, playtest-centered game development, and story structure for game designers.
