= Brainwash Gang =

Spanish video game developer

- Type: Private
- Industry: Video games
- Founded: 2015; 11 years ago in Madrid, Spain
- Area served: Worldwide
- Key people: Edu Verz (creative director)
- Website: brainwash-gang.com

Brainwash Gang is an indie video game developer based in Madrid, Spain. They released the action roguelike Nongünz in May 2017 for personal computer platforms, and Laika: Aged Through Blood in 2023 and are developing Damnview: Built From Nothing.

== Games developed ==
| Year | Title | Genre(s) | Publisher | Platform(s) | Notes |
|---|---|---|---|---|---|
| 2017 | Nongunz | Action, roguelike | Digerati | Microsoft Windows, MacOS, Linux, Nintendo Switch, PlayStation 4, Xbox One | Home console ports released in 2021 as Nongunz: Doppelganger Edition |
| 2021 | The Longest Road on Earth | Life simulation | Raw Fury | Microsoft Windows, Nintendo Switch, iOS, Android, PlayStation 4, Xbox One, PlayStation 5, Xbox Series X/S | Co-developed alongside TLR Games; First title released on mobile devices Home console ports released in 2022 |
| 2021 | Grotto | Adventure | Digerati | Microsoft Windows, Nintendo Switch, iOS, Android, PlayStation 4, Xbox One, PlayStation 5, Xbox Series X/S | Mobile and home console ports in development |
| 2023 | Friends vs Friends | First-person shooter, deck-building, platform | Raw Fury | Microsoft Windows, consoles | Home console ports released in 2023 |
| 2023 | Laika: Aged Through Blood | Metroidvania, action-adventure | Headup Games | Microsoft Windows, PlayStation 4, Xbox One, PlayStation 5, Xbox Series X/S, Nintendo Switch | Nintendo Switch port released in 2025 |
| TBA | Damnview: Built From Nothing | Life simulation, sandbox | Sindiecate Arts | Microsoft Windows, Nintendo Switch, PlayStation 4, Xbox One | |
