= Next Wave Festival =

Australian arts festival

Next Wave is a biennial festival based in Melbourne, which promotes and showcases the work of young and emerging artists. Next Wave encourages interdisciplinary practice and fosters the creation and presentation of works by emerging artists working across a broad range of art forms, including dance, theatre, visual arts, performance, new media, and literature.

Next Wave is also an artist development organisation and in non-festival years, it runs a development program called Kickstart Helix (formerly Kickstart) with the potential of their works being performed in the following year's festival program.

In August 2007, Next Wave presented Free Play: The Next Wave Independent Game Developers' Conference, at the Australian Centre for the Moving Image.

== History ==
Next Wave was established in 1984, under the direction of Founding Director Andrew Bleby. The first Next Wave Festival took place in 1985, and established its focus on developing and presenting work by young Australian artists. From 1998 onwards, the festival has occurred biennially.

Next Wave is supported principally through Arts Victoria, the City of Melbourne, and the Australia Council for the Arts. In 2006, the then Minister for the Arts, Mary Delahunty, announced a funding increase to Victorian festivals (following a strategic funding review), with Next Wave receiving $350,000 in annual funding.

The COVID-19 pandemic forced the 2020 festival to go virtual.

=== 2016 Next Wave Festival ===
Forgoing a Festival theme, Director Georgie Meagher invited artists to 'think wide, listen deep and go long'. The event ran 5–22 May and was clustered into geographic precincts across Melbourne, presenting work in a series of both traditional and unique spaces, including the Royal Botanic Gardens Melbourne, an underground carpark, and a storage unit. 37 projects spanned the Festival, including theatre, dance, visual art, music, parties and workshops. Highlights include Nat Randall's 24-hour epic The Second Woman at ACMI; Pony Express's Ecosexual Bathhouse; The Delta Project's Under My Skin; Maurial Spearim's BlaaQ Catt, a series of Indigenous Language Workshops hosted in partnership with Victorian Aboriginal Corporation for Languages, and a Writers in Residence program for writers with disability.

Next Wave Festival 2016 was the organisation's most inclusive and accessible yet for artists and audiences with disability, and in recognition Next Wave was awarded a VicHealth Award for Building Health Through Arts.

=== 2014 Next Wave Festival – New Grand Narrative ===
Artistic Director Emily Sexton asked artists to respond to the idea of the 'New Grand Narrative' for the 2014 festival taking place 1–11 May. Specifically the festival was offering the following ideas to be explored, "How do we come to care about things we're not interested in? The information we encounter is increasingly curated. And we have increased ability to filter that which doesn't add to our worldview. There are less pages of the newspaper to turn, more apps to buy and I don't have to follow you if you're not relevant. What are the grand narratives of our time? How do we come to understand them and whose voices create their meaning?" 38 commissioned works by 239 artists from across Australia, the Philippines, Korea, Lebanon, Canada and the UK made up the 2014 event.

Blak Wave was the keynote initiative of the 2014 Festival, presenting major commissions, public conversations and a publication that explored the future of Indigenous art.

2014 Victorian Green Room Awards nominations included:

- HOME by Brienna Macnish
- Fluvial by Matthias Schack-Arnott (WINNER)
- Terminal by Dylan Sheridan
- Personal Mythologies by Shian Law
- Wael Zuaiter: Unknown by Creative Nonfiction (WINNER)
- Madonna Arms by I'm Trying to Kiss You
- Next Wave Festival 2014 for Curatorial Contribution to Contemporary Performance

=== 2012 Next Wave Festival – The space between us wants to sing ===
The Next Wave Festival unfolded from 19 to 27 May 2012. Its theme was 'The space between us wants to sing' and was Emily Sexton's first festival as Artistic Director. The theme was explored by artists in a variety of ways including No Show's interactive theatre piece, Shotgun Wedding and The Greater Asia Co-Prosperity Sphere by Asian-Australian artists Abdul Abdullah, Nathan Beard and Casey Ayres. This part-installation part-performance piece took place in the National Gallery of Victoria.

Several works were nominated for various categories of the Green Room Awards including:

- The River Eats by Justin Shoulder
- Bingo Unit by Team Mess
- Flyway by Elizabeth Dunn
- The Stream / The Boat / The Shore / The Bridge by Dan Koop & Co.
- Blindscape by Skye Gellann
- Monster Body by Atlanta Eke
- Supertone by Rennie McDougall
- Hiatus by Fiona Bryant & Lucy Farmer

"The Stream / The Boat / The Shore / The Bridge" was subsequently awarded Outstanding Production – Creative Agency For Audiences.

=== 2010 Next Wave Festival – No risk too great ===
Can art be challenging and meaningful in a risk-averse, overly cautious society obsessed with security, OH&S policies and micro-management of behaviour?

The 2010 Next Wave Festival's theme, 'No Risk Too Great', was a challenge to the artists to be ambitious and see what art can achieve while asking the question: is our society and our art too safe? Next Wave opened up new spaces for artists to explore this question. Building on the momentum of previous Festivals, the 2010 Festival brought together around 53 projects and over 300 artists from Victoria, Australia and across Asia. Popular highlights were Bennett Miller's Dachshund U.N., the Sports Club Project at the MCG and the Festival Club. It was also Jeff Khan's final festival in the role of Artistic Director.

=== 2008 Next Wave Festival – Closer Together ===
Themed 'Closer Together', the 2008 Next Wave Festival involved almost 400 artists working across 61 projects in 40 or so Melbourne venues. Around 155,000 people came to an exhibition, saw a theatre or dance show, rocked up to one of five or more festival parties or caught one of the festival's Keynote Projects. It all began on 15 May when 1300 people came along to the festival's opening night at Federation Square in the heart of the city. From there it was 16 days of some of the best work by Australia's leading emerging artists. Significantly Next Wave organised a series of Keynote Projects that involved the Canadian duo The Movement Movement jogging more than 150 people through the Melbourne Museum; a vast series of workshops and forums in Polyphonic; a collection of artists and artist-run initiatives from around Australia presenting new work in and around Federation Square in a project called Membrane, and a two art/nightclub events, called The Nightclub Project, staged at two unique venues in the heart of Melbourne's CBD.

=== 2006 Next Wave Festival – Empire Games ===
The 2006 Next Wave Festival was themed 'Empire Games' to coincide with the 2006 Melbourne Commonwealth Games, which took place from 15 to 26 March 2006. Running alongside all the sporting events was a free cultural festival called Festival Melbourne 2006, and Next Wave was responsible for delivering the Youth Program for this festival.

The program for the 'Empire Games' Festival engaged with Melbourne's characteristic architecture and urban space. Some of the key projects included 100 Points of Light, which transformed the city's laneways and shop fronts with installations and projections, and the Containers Village at Melbourne's Docklands, which presented the work of forty-three Commonwealth artist-groups in shipping containers.

Empire Games also presented innovative regional projects, including the digital art project Bitscape. Artist Pip Shea worked with youth from Morwell, Moe, Wagga Wagga and the Macedon Ranges to create audio-visual works which were displayed as large-scale projections on a 90-metre high cooling tower.

=== 2004 Next Wave Festival – Unpopular Culture ===
Theme for the 2004 Festival was 'Unpopular Culture' and was designed to encourage a range of responses to current-day issues and youth culture. Artistic Director Marcus Westbury, who was in the demographic of festival artists, embraced Melbourne's inner-city laneways, old Dojos and empty buildings. Highlights included the Festival Club, which presented the first ever Freeplay conference, the Containers at Federation Square program, and Colliding Worlds – a major regional program. In all 600 artists participated in 90 projects that attracted massive audiences and inspired a new generation of young Next Wave participants.

=== 2002 Next Wave Festival – Free at Last ===
Under the direction of Steven Richardson as Executive Producer/CEO and David Young as Festival Director, the 2002 Next Wave Festival was most notable for offering an entirely free program. With the tag line 'Free at Last', the festival delivered a cultural rodeo of art, pop culture, new media, social action, environmental concerns, healthy dissent and extreme sport. The most colossal example of this was the Colony Project, during which acrobatic angels lived in the spire of the Victorian Arts Centre. The Festival also featured the on-line Megabite project, showcasing short works of digital animation.

=== 2000 Next Wave Festival – Wide Awake – Dreaming at Twilight ===
To usher Next Wave into a new century and millennium, Artistic Director Campion Decent quickly settled on the theme Wide Awake – Dreaming at Twilight. From this a program was curated, exploring ideas of collective dreaming, slipping between subliminal states of alertness. The 2000 Digital Arts package saw technology spill over into everything from live performance to the visual arts. The festival's web site was by far the most extensive thus far, including an events program, audience surveys, discussion lists, and an annexe to the community-building exercise Fest on the Net.

=== 1998 Next Wave Festival – Distance ===
While each festival emerges with its own vision, Artistic Director Zane Trow entered his fourth festival with a decision to develop a program along a single curatorial brief: Distance. The theme encouraged various responses, with artists exploring distance along various lines, including geography, culture and gender. Zane was unable to complete his tenure, and Wendy Lasica seized the reins to see out the festival, providing 625 Australian artists opportunities to present their work and ideas to some 238,000 attendees.

=== 1985 – 1994 Next Wave Festival ===
Whilst the festival is staged every two years, non-festival years see special events. In 1993 Next Wave produced South East, a collaboration of community workers, teachers, young people, and established and emerging artists described as a "cabaret for the nineties" with the spotlight on fusions of contemporary and traditional south-east Asian art forms.

Come 1994, the festival played host to events and programs attracting audiences of 80,000 people. In the Art and Technology program, digital artists were attracted from the USA, Japan, Germany and Spain. At a national level, the 7th National Youth Arts Conference was planned to coincide with Next Wave – drawing together delegates from across the country to discuss the future practice and direction of youth arts.

1992 saw Zane Trow enter the role of Artistic Director and steer the festival in new directions. The new program area Art & Technology supported artistic endeavours that explored emerging technologies. BYTEBEAT gave witness to nine local 'techno pop bands' playing to 1000 revellers in the Great Hall of the NGV. Berni Janssen coordinated the growing Writers Programme, with a video documentary of the program made by secondary school students. Behind the scenes, radio trainees took over 3RRR, and RMIT Media Studies students produced reviewing programs for 3JJJ.

In 1990 for the third time Andrew Bleby held the helm of Festival Director, launching both the festival and young artists well into the '90s. As if psychically pre-empting one of the new decade's iconic themes, the 1990 Next Wave Festival opened with 'Planet Earth Boogie' – drawing attention to environmental and indigenous issues through the creative energy of thousands of teenagers and youth. As another first, the festival included a significant program for young writers and readers, a fitting innovation for International Literacy Year.

With the second festival lined up to coincide with Australia's bicentenary in '88, Victorians endured a wait of three years for the next instalment of what was already established as the state's most significant arts event. In that time the festival developed in size and scope, with more new works and proportionally more young people as performers, writers, directors, musicians and visual artists. Now a festival institution, the opening saw an invasion of the Melbourne City Square, with a quintessentially '80s titled (6000-people-strong) party, 'The Next Wave Boogie'.

Before the Melbourne Festival was launched off the back of Spoleto, 1985 ushered in the state's major arts festival. In the year of Victoria's 150th Anniversary and International Youth Year, Next Wave was as timely as it was urgent as an expression of the state's emerging youth arts. Under direction from Andrew Bleby, the first festival set precedents to be built on in years to come: 80 per cent of events involved young artists, 90 per cent were Australian, and there were 13 regional festivals across Victoria.

== Kickstart Helix ==
Kickstart Helix is Next Wave's major developmental activity, assisting early career artists across artforms, along with writers, curators and producers, to develop new work in a supportive environment. Taking place in the non-festival year, Kickstart projects are developed with a view towards inclusion in the forthcoming Next Wave Festival. Kickstart participants undertake a program of workshops covering all aspects of project development including creative development, budgeting and marketing as well as receiving ongoing administrative support and professional advice from the Next Wave staff during the Kickstart period. Kickstart programs culminate in developmental showings of the work-in-progress to peers, stakeholders and other Kickstart participants.

== See also ==
- List of festivals in Australia
- 2006 Commonwealth Games
- Australian Centre for the Moving Image
- Marcus Westbury
