= Laika: Aged Through Blood =

2023 video game

- Developer: Brainwash Gang
- Publisher: Headup Games
- Composer: Beatriz "Beícoli" Ruiz-Castillo
- Platforms: Windows; PlayStation 4; PlayStation 5; Xbox One; Xbox Series X/S; Nintendo Switch
- Release: October 19, 2023: Windows; WW: October 19, 2023 PS4, PS5, Xbox One, Xbox Series X/S; WW: December 5, 2023 Nintendo Switch; WW: January 30, 2025
- Genre: Metroidvania
- Mode: Single-player

Laika: Aged Through Blood is a 2023 2D side-scrolling Metroidvania video game developed by Brainwash Gang and published by Headup Games. The game, set in a Western-style post-apocalyptic world, follows Laika, an anthropomorphic coyote, as she tries to protect her family and village from the encroaching Bird empire. She journeys through the game world on a motorcycle, which the player accelerates and rotates to ride on uneven ground, block bullets, and reload Laika's various guns.

The game began development in 2019 as one of several prototypes by the Madrid, Spain-based developer and underwent several revisions in design. Once funding was established from Headup Games in late 2021, development was restarted as a more polished product. Brainwash Gang is run as a co-operative and does not divide its developers into formal job roles, as many of them have experience with multiple parts of game design as solo developers, though the music for the game was composed and performed by Beatriz "Beícoli" Ruiz-Castillo.

Laika was released for Microsoft Windows on October 19, 2023 and for the PlayStation 4, PlayStation 5, Xbox One, and Xbox Series X/S on December 5. A Nintendo Switch port was released on January 30, 2025. The game was positively received upon release, with most critics acclaiming its story, art design and music, but having mixed opinions on how frustrating they found the challenging gameplay.

== Gameplay ==
Laika high in a tree, surrounded by Bird soldiers. She is mid-flip and about to be hit by a bullet; a viscera bag is to her left and another resource is on the branch in the top left.

Laika: Aged Through Blood is a 2D side-scrolling Metroidvania video game set in a Western-style post-apocalyptic world. The player controls Laika, an anthropomorphic coyote, primarily while she rides a motorcycle. The player can make the motorcycle accelerate, stop, and reverse direction, and can rotate it left and right. The game world is divided into multiple named areas. Laika travels through these areas collecting resources and performing quests, given either by non-playable characters encountered throughout the world or primarily by residents of her village.

The game world is populated by enemies, anthropomorphic birds, who predominately attack Laika on sight with ranged weapons. Non-explosive attacks can be blocked by the motorcycle's bottom or deflected back at the attacker if parried at the time of impact. Laika is killed if she is hit by any attack or if she hits the ground or other surfaces with her head. If killed, she respawns at the last checkpoint—bone shrines—activated by the player, or else at the entrance to the area. Enemies respawn whenever Laika dies or if she leaves and re-enters an area.

Laika can carry several weapons throughout the game, namely a revolver, shotgun, machine gun, crossbow, sniper rifle, and rocket launcher. These weapons have a very limited amount of ammo but can be reloaded indefinitely by performing a full backwards rotation of the motorcycle. Shooting birds kills them in one hit, just as with Laika. The exception is boss battles, which take place at plot relevant moments and feature enemies that take several shots to kill.

The weapons are gathered throughout the course of the game and can be upgraded in the village with resources to have more ammo or reload with less rotation. Resources which are gathered by finding plants, rocks, or chests, and shooting them. The exception is viscera, which acts as a currency, which is expelled from enemies to Laika when they die. When Laika dies, she leaves behind a bag with half of the viscera collected, which can be retrieved; repeated deaths without retrieving the bags cause them to disappear.

== Synopsis ==
=== Setting ===
The game takes place in the Wasteland, a post-apocalyptic world inhabited by anthropomorphic animals of various species. Hundreds of years ago, the Birds declared themselves biologically superior, and swept across the land in conquest. Eventually, the rampant consumption of resources and the escalation of war turned the world into a wasteland of crumbling structures where the few remaining non-birds hide from the patrolling Bird soldiers. Laika's village has recently relocated from their ancestral home, "Where We Used to Live", to a more remote location, "Where We Live", to stay hidden from the Birds, and she serves as the guardian of her town and the only person allowed to leave to gather supplies.

=== Story ===
Laika hears that a child from her town, Poochie, has been crucified by the Birds. Poochie's father, Jakob, in a fit of blind rage took Laika's revolver to confront them. Laika follows Jakob to the military base, where she finds out the Birds are experimenting with the genes of prehistoric animals and weaponizing them. After successfully defeating one of the Birds' artificial monsters, Laika takes Jakob's body back to Where We Live. There, the player learns that Laika's bloodline is cursed: each woman in her family returns from the dead along with their bone motorcycle when killed, and can speak with the spirits of the recently deceased. They lose these abilities when their daughter first Bleeds, passing the abilities on to them in turn.

After Jakob's funeral, Laika's mother Maya worries that Laika is coddling her daughter Puppy, and wants Puppy to be trained in combat and biking before she becomes of age and inherits the curse. Laika, however, resents her mother and wants Puppy to enjoy the innocence of youth a little longer. Puppy worries for Poochie since his body was never recovered and his soul cannot rest without a proper burial. As the Birds are moving closer and closer to Where We Live, the village Elder orders Laika to seek an alliance with Where Rocks Bleed, a large mining town of mole people; to destroy a relay station in the Lighthouse to disrupt the Birds' communication; and to go to Where Birds Came From and destroy The Big Tree, a pyramid cathedral that holds historic and religious value to the Birds, in hopes of crippling their leadership and morale. Laika does so, but discovers that the moles have been largely killed already; weaponized monsters are being deployed throughout the wasteland; and the traditional religious leaders, oversized mutated Birds, have been supplanted by the heads of the military.

Laika returns to Where We Live, angry at the orders of the Elder since they have achieved nothing but an increased presence of Birds in the Wasteland. Puppy, who has been showing signs of stubborn adolescence and anger towards her mother for not finding Poochie's body, runs away from home to search for herself. Laika finds that one of the townsfolk sold Puppy to Beícoli, an exiled singer. After confronting and killing Beícoli in a Bird slum town, Laika learns that Puppy was about to be transported to "Heaven" because the Birds know about Laika's immortality and want to experiment on it. Laika takes Puppy back, apologizing for not acknowledging her child's worries. Puppy, however, has a high fever, a sign that she is soon to Bleed. The player learns that Laika had two previous daughters, both of whom died from the fever, and was forced by her mother and the Elder to have another child to carry on the curse.

Maya worries that Puppy may either die from her fever, leaving Laika with no children, or inherit the immortality too early, leaving Puppy in an escalating war with no training, so Laika goes off to end to war as soon as possible. Laika makes her way to "Heaven", a floating city where the elite class of Birds live. She receives help from Pluck, the leader of a group of rebel Birds who have heard of the exploits of the "Grim Biker". Pluck warns her that the city is currently holding a ceremony to drop the Egg, a nuclear weapon that will eradicate all life in the Wastelands, leaving only the elite Birds in Heaven alive. While entering the city, Pluck is killed and Laika is captured. She is confronted by the head of the military, who has mutated himself into The Two-Beaked God as the absolute ruler of Bird society and religion. After the player kills him, the Egg is dropped along with Laika. She hears on her radio from back home that Puppy's fever has subsided, meaning that Puppy has taken her immortality. Laika tells Puppy to learn from her mother's mistakes, and destroys the Egg in midair, detonating it and saving the Wasteland. The game ends with Puppy attending Laika's funeral.

== Development ==
Laika: Aged Through Blood was developed by Brainwash Gang, an independent game development studio from Madrid, Spain. Development began in 2019 as part of a series of game prototypes by the studio, with the intention of trying to attract funding from a publisher to turn one into a full game. This early version of the game went through several revisions of gameplay, story, and art, including more "arcade" and linear versions of the game. Laika, along with other prototypes in development, were shown publicly in an early state in September 2019; at that point, design elements such as motorcycle riding, the Wasteland, and Laika's relationship with Puppy were present in the game. Members of the team each worked on multiple areas of the game, as many of the developers were previously solo developers of Flash games, and the company was structured like a co-operative without formal job roles.

The characters were chosen to be anthropomorphic animals as it was felt that players would more easily ascribe associated character traits based on what animal each character was, and along with the motorcycle, they were intended to give an "underground" or indie feeling to the game. Early in development, aspects of the story and art design were metaphors for colonialism and the United States army, but these designs were purposefully changed over time to not reflect any one culture. Similarly, visual and linguistic references to Spain and Spanish were changed to be more accessible to players in other countries. Beyond the Metroidvania genre itself, the team was inspired by Lisa: The Painful (2014) for the setting and Undertale (2015) for the pronounced character personalities.

The music for the game was composed by Beatriz "Beícoli" Ruiz-Castillo. She divided the tracks into ambient tracks for boss battles and story moments and "mixtapes" that play as Laika travels the Wasteland, with mixtapes featuring Beícoli singing and a variety of guitar-based styles. These are incorporated in-game as music tapes that the player can find, with Beícoli herself as a character in-game who recorded them.

Brainwash Gang described the final version of the prototype as a "motorvania", combining "motorcycle" with "Metroidvania", and got Headup Games as a publisher. Once funding was received, Brainwash recreated all of the artwork and design of the game as a more polished product. A trailer showing an early art style was released by Brainwash in mid-2021. Laika was officially announced in November 2021 by Headup's parent company Thunderful Games for Windows and home consoles, though no release date or specific console platforms were given. During the Future Games Show Summer Showcase in June 2023, Laika was re-revealed with a demo, and the game was released on October 19 for Windows and December 5 for PlayStation 4, PlayStation 5, Xbox One, and Xbox Series X/S. A Nintendo Switch port was slated for release on January 11, 2024, but was delayed to January 30, 2025. The music was released as two albums, Laika: Aged Through Blood Original Soundtrack for the mixtapes, released alongside the game on October 19, 2023, and Laika: Sounds From the Wasteland for the ambient tracks, released on December 13. The first album was released as Laika: Aged Through Blood OST for vinyl record and cassette tape by Lost in Cult on April 17, 2025.

== Reception ==
Reception

Aggregate score
Aggregator	Score
Metacritic	(PC) 83/100 (NS) 82/100

Review scores
Publication	Score
IGN	9/10
IGN Japan	8/10
Paste	8.4/10
Gamereactor	7/10
CGMagazine	7/10
The Games Machine	9/10

Laika: Aged Through Blood received "generally favorable reviews", according to the review aggregator Metacritic. Critics highly praised the gameplay, though the difficulty had a mixed reception. Brendan Graeber of IGN, Elijah Gonzalez of Paste, and Andrea Scibetta of The Games Machine all highly praised the challenging gameplay, and enjoyed the mechanical difficulty and excitement of trying to shoot, dodge, deflect, reload, and land the motorcycle all in continual sequence, even if it resulted in repeatedly dying, partially due to the frequent checkpoints. Other reviewers had similar opinions on how fun controlling the motorcycle and fighting enemies was, but different opinions on the difficulty or frustrations with some mechanics. Rollin Bishop of GamesRadar+, in a partial review, enjoyed the gameplay, but said that he would likely not be able to finish the game due to the difficulty. Andrew Farrell of CGMagazine, while enjoying the gameplay, found that dying from a faulty landing and having to recollect viscera upon death were frustrating rather than enjoyably difficult. Magnus Groth-Andersen of Gamereactor also disliked collecting lost viscera, and felt that the enemies respawning upon Laika's death made moving around the game world slow and frustrating, which was also deemed a problem in an otherwise positive review by Maki-chan of IGN Japan. The Paste, Gamereactor, and IGN Japan reviews also found navigation using the in-game map confusing.

The story of the game was largely praised by reviewers. The Games Machine termed it "a violent and angry story, at times profound" that succeeded in connecting with players emotionally. IGN and Paste also praised the story, with IGN giving extra consideration to the characters, especially Laika, while Paste applauded the thoughtful worldbuilding underpinning what they felt was a deep story. IGN Japan, in praising the story, particularly highlighted as a noteworthy distinction from most action games the "detached and smart feminist perspective on violence and war" due to the game's focus on the relationships between the women of Laika's family and the violence they found themselves caught in. Gamereactor, in contrast to other reviews, said that the story was "too vague, and a bit too drawn out too".

The art design of the game was also praised by reviewers; IGN Japan and Paste both praised the visual art and character designs, while IGN praised the "exceptional hand painted backdrops" and the way that the visual and level design of different areas were connected. Gamereactor was effusive in its praise of the art and design, saying that it was "beautiful to look at" with a strong handmade style. The music was universally praised by reviewers, with IGN Japan and Paste claiming the "soulful soundtrack" was responsible for much of the atmosphere of the game, and The Games Machine, Gamereactor, and GamesRadar+ all praising the "beautiful" and "brilliant" music. Brendan Graeber of IGN concluded that "I really can't sing enough praises for Laika: Aged Through Blood's soundtrack and all the clever ways it affects the world around you," and said that the way it was tied into the narrative elevated the game. The soundtrack was named by online music magazine Pitchfork as one of the best indie video game scores of 2023.
