= The Last Hero of Nostalgaia =

- Developer: Over the Moon
- Publisher: Coatsink
- Engine: Unity
- Platforms: Windows; Xbox One; Xbox Series X/S; Nintendo Switch; PlayStation 4; PlayStation 5
- Release: Win, Xbox; WW: October 19, 2022; Switch, PS; WW: June 20, 2023
- Genre: Soulslike
- Modes: Single-player, multiplayer

The Last Hero of Nostalgaia is a 2022 Soulslike action role-playing video game developed by Canadian indie studio Over the Moon and published by Coatsink. It is a satirical pastiche of FromSoftware's Dark Souls series and a wider tribute to video game nostalgia. The game was released for Microsoft Windows, Xbox One and S on October 19, 2022, with PlayStation 4, PlayStation 5 and Nintendo Switch versions following on June 20, 2023.

== Gameplay ==
The Last Hero of Nostalgaia is a third-person Soulslike action role-playing game. The player controls a customizable stick-figure protagonist navigating a fading fantasy world called Nostalgaia, which represents the world of video games collapsing into low-resolution pixelation.

Combat follows established Soulslike conventions: melee attacks and defensive moves consume a stamina meter, and difficulty is balanced around learning enemy attack patterns, timing dodges and managing risk against powerful boss encounters. Player progress is saved at checkpoints scattered through the world; locating a checkpoint also restores graphical fidelity to its surroundings, with low-resolution 2D environments shifting to fuller 3D presentation, and equipment that the player is wearing gains more detailed art once its associated lore checkpoint is discovered. A narrator provides commentary throughout, alternately helping and mocking the player. The game supports online cooperative play for two players.

== Plot ==
The game is set in Nostalgaia, the fictional world of video games, which is being consumed by a creeping pixelation that erases the memories and stories of its heroes. The player controls a nameless stick figure — the most degraded hero remaining in Nostalgaia — and must complete neglected quests, defeat bosses and restore lost lore to halt the collapse. The story is delivered primarily through the narrator's commentary and through references to video game history embedded in the world's design.

== Development ==
Over the Moon, founded by Jon Warner, is a Vancouver-based indie studio whose previous releases were the dialogue-driven action-adventure games The Fall (2014) and The Fall Part 2: Unbound (2018). Warner has said the studio aims to make games with substantive ideas presented in an accessible way, and that the Last Hero's premise of a fallen, neglected hero was directly inspired by the abandonment-of-duty themes in Dark Souls III. The game was built in Unity. It was published by Coatsink, based in Gateshead in the United Kingdom.

== Release ==
The Last Hero of Nostalgaia was released worldwide for Microsoft Windows, Xbox One and Xbox Series X|S on October 19, 2022. The PlayStation 4, PlayStation 5 and Nintendo Switch versions followed on June 20, 2023, alongside the simultaneous release of a downloadable content expansion, The Rise of Evil, on all platforms. A Deluxe Edition bundling the base game with the new expansion was made available on all platforms at the same time.

== Downloadable content ==
The Rise of Evil, released on June 20, 2023, adds two new areas, "Easymaker's Retreat" and "The Builder's Sanctuary", along with three new boss encounters and additional weapons and armor.

== Reception ==
On Metacritic, The Last Hero of Nostalgaia received "generally favorable" reviews for the Windows version and "mixed or average" reviews for the Xbox Series X|S version.

Reviewers generally praised the game's premise, narrator commentary, and visual transitions between pixelated and high-fidelity art, while criticism focused on combat that felt derivative, technical issues, and limited variety in enemies and environments. IGN called the game "a competent RPG" that does not add anything new to the soulslike formula, while praising its humor, world-building and visuals. Hardcore Gamer felt it had enough charm and challenge to appeal to soulslike fans, but said it lacked the depth of the games it parodied in both combat and progression. Reviewing for The Escapist, Andrea Shearon Lao was more critical, arguing that the parody often crossed into self-defeating territory, with intentionally poor combat and environment design becoming hard to distinguish from genuine shortcomings.

Nintendo World Report and TouchArcade both praised the underlying game while noting significant performance issues on the Nintendo Switch port.
