= Knuckle Sandwich (video game) =

Turn-based strategy video game

- Developer: Andrew Brophy
- Engine: GameMaker
- Platforms: macOS, Windows
- Release: November 23, 2023
- Genre: Role-playing game
- Mode: Single-player

Knuckle Sandwich is a role-playing video game created by Andrew Brophy. The game follows the story of a boy who leaves home to seek work in a new city. After securing a job at a rundown diner, he inadvertently becomes entangled in a missing persons mystery involving a bizarre gang and a fanatical cult. The gameplay features fast-paced minigames reminiscent of WarioWare, combined with turn-based combat. The Windows version of the game was released on November 23, 2023.

While games journalists have compared Knuckle Sandwich to EarthBound (1994), the developer has said that the game was not a direct influence, as it was not originally released in his home region of Australia.
