= Otxo =

OTXO
- The game's Steam page banner
- Developer: Lateralis Heavy Industries (Nathan Haddock)
- Publisher: Super Rare Originals
- Platforms: Windows; Nintendo Switch; PlayStation 4; PlayStation 5
- Release: Windows; April 20, 2023; Nintendo Switch, PlayStation 4, PlayStation 5; March 28, 2024
- Genre: Top-down shooter
- Mode: Single-player

Otxo is a 2023 top-down shooter game developed by Lateralis Heavy Industries and published by Super Rare Originals. The game follows an unnamed protagonist as he traverses through a supernatural mansion with randomly-generated floors, killing all enemies inside as he searches for his long lost lover, who is trapped inside the mansion. The player is able to use a variety of weapons and abilities against the enemies, of which a main ability is known as "Focus", a meter that allows the player to manipulate and slow down time to their advantage in combat. Around a hundred extra performance-enhancing abilities are obtainable via numerous beverages that the player is able to purchase at a bar. It is presented in a black-and-white art style, with the exception of red being used to represent blood and gunfire.

Otxo was inspired by the video game Hotline Miami (2012) and the John Wick film series. The game was first revealed in late 2021 via a teaser trailer on the Lateralis YouTube channel and was released for Windows in April 2023. Ports for Nintendo Switch, PlayStation 4, and PlayStation 5 released in March 2024. It received generally positive reviews from critics, with praise towards the sound design and fast-paced combat, but criticisms toward its roguelike aspects and replayability, which some considered weak. It was compared to its inspiration Hotline Miami by numerous publications, with some considering it equal in quality to the game.

== Gameplay ==
A screenshot of Otxo, demonstrating its gameplay and mostly monochrome artstyle

Otxo is a top-down shooter game with numerous roguelike aspects presented in a black-and-white pixel artstyle, with the sole exception of red, which is used to demonstrate blood and gunfire. In the game, the player assumes the role of an unnamed, silent protagonist as they traverse through several different floors in a supernatural mansion, each randomly generated from a pool of 150 different rooms. Player health and resources within the game are limited, which may require the player to improvise their combat through different methods, such as stealth or fast-paced action. While some of these rooms may have a bar, boss fight, or some sort of narrative exposition, most are filled with fast-paced enemies which plan out their attacks, taking cover and moving positions when attacked.

Otxo allows the player to defeat these enemies using a variety of weapons found across the mansion, which can be acquired from the bodies of defeated enemies. The player can also use special moves such as a dodge roll and an ability known as "Focus", which slows down time and allows the player to evade gunfire. The player is also able to defeat enemies through various other methods, such as hitting them with doors or kunai and grenades. Defeating enemies will award the player with coins, with better performance in combat awarding the player extra coins via a multiplier. These coins can be used to purchase various beverages at the bar's, giving the player unique abilities (ex. turning invisible while dodge rolling). The player can unlock more beverages via donating additional coins to the bar, with the game containing around one hundred beverages in total. The player can also spend their coins on Gashapon machines found throughout the mansion, where they can unlock new weapons and collectibles.

== Plot ==
Otxo begins with an unnamed silent protagonist and his lover sitting down on a bench, where he puts on a mysterious mask and falls asleep. Shortly after, he wakes up on the beach of a supernatural mansion, in which his lover is lost and trapped. Approaching the mansion, the protagonist meets up with a bartender who offers him a free imported beverage before the protagonist begins his massacres of most inside the mansion. Occasionally, the protagonist will run into a supernatural enemy that takes the form of some sort of monster, which he defeats before continuing his rampage. Throughout the course of the game, he also continues to meet up with the bartender he meet earlier, while encountering a few other characters. Small pieces of backstory on inhabitants of mansion are provided to the protagonist during his travels.

After defeating most enemies inside, the protagonist reaches the mansion's final floor, where its "Forsaken Heart" is located. The heart eventually transcends to a different reality before the protagonist defeats it and rips it apart. As the Forsaken Heart is destroyed, the protagonist takes off his mask and the mansion is implied to vanish out of existence. He shortly after reconciles with his lover. Years later, the two are shown at a train stop before the protagonist travels elsewhere. Shortly after, the protagonist takes out the mask he wore during his massacres before putting it back and boarding the train.

== Release and reception ==
Otxo was developed by Lateralis Heavy Industries, an Idaho-based studio of only one developer, Nathan Haddock, and published by Super Rare Originals. Haddock was the sole developer of the game as well as its composer, though others were credited for aspects such as character design. The gameplay was inspired by the video game Hotline Miami (2012), and some noted the mansion setting to be possibly be inspired by the John Wick film series. The game's title means "wolf". The first teaser trailer revealing the game was uploaded on the Lateralis YouTube channel on December 10, 2021. A demo was published during Steam Next Fest in October 2022, and was available for one week. The game released for Windows via Steam on April 20, 2023, and for Nintendo Switch, PlayStation 4, and PlayStation 5 on March 28, 2024.

Reception

Aggregate scores
Aggregator	Score
Metacritic	81/100
OpenCritic	69%

Review scores
Publication	Score
Softpedia	4/5
The Games Machine	8.5/10
Nintendo Life	7/10
Nintendo World Report	6.5/10

Otxo received "generally favorable" reviews from critics, according to review aggregator website Metacritic. 69% of critics recommended the game on OpenCritic.

The game's gameplay was very positively received, and was also likened to that of its inspiration, Hotline Miami. Giovanni Colantonio of Digital Trends praised the game for its fast-paced action gameplay and differences from Hotline Miami's formula, describing it to be executed in Otxo with "pinpoint precision." Ali Jones of GamesRadar+ considered the game to have more consistent artificial intelligence and replay value than Hotline Miami. On the contrary, Andrei Dumitrescu of Softpedia criticized the lack of player advancement and upgrades, considering the roguelike elements to be the weakest part of the game and wishing that there were more permanent upgrades for the player, as well as finding the game bland hard to play due to the black-and-white artstyle. Emanuele Feronato of The Games Machine also considered the roguelike elements to be fairly weak. Furthermore, He, Renata Price of Vice and Colantonio of Digital Trends all agreed that the game could get repetitive after a while, though all of them as well as Jones of GamesRadar+ all believed Otxo was a comparable in quality to Hotline Miami.

On the topic of the game's plot, Dumitrescu of Softpedia described the game as having a "trope-filled narrative", but believed that the game did not need a narrative to increase its level of immersion. Price of Vice simply described the game's story as a "classic revenge story", though wrote that loss served as the "core of the mansion's supernatural power."

Critics praised the game's sound design. Dumitrescu of Softpedia, Jones of GamesRadar+, and Feronato of The Games Machine praised the game's soundtrack, which Dumitrescu believed to motivate the player to kill more enemies through increasing the tension. The sounds of firearms were described as being the "most interesting part about the game's presentation" by Dumitrescu, believing that they made each battle feel more deadly.
