= Necrobarista =

- Developer: Route 59
- Publisher: Route 59
- Composer: Kevin Penkin
- Engine: Unity
- Platforms: iOS; macOS; Microsoft Windows; PlayStation 4; Nintendo Switch
- Release: iOS, macOS; July 17, 2020; Microsoft Windows; July 22, 2020; Nintendo Switch; August 11, 2021
- Genre: Visual novel
- Mode: Single-player

Necrobarista is a 2020 visual novel game developed by Australian development studio Route 59. The player follows a cast of characters around a Melbourne back-alley coffeehouse staffed by necromancers, named the 'Terminal'. In the Terminal, the souls of the recently departed are given a final 24 hours to reside in the world alongside the living.

The game was released on July 17, 2020 for macOS and iOS via Apple Arcade, July 22, 2020 for Windows, and August 11, 2021 for Nintendo Switch. The original game was divided into ten chapters, with two stand-alone chapters focusing on minor or new characters being released as free DLCs; the game's name was changed to Necrobarista - Final Pour after both DLCs were added to the base game on all platforms. The game is also scheduled to release at a later date for PlayStation 4.

== Overview ==
Necrobarista is a visual novel set in a Melbourne coffee shop that serves both the living and dead, and is visited by gangsters, hipsters, and necromancers. Eschewing the 2D art typical to the genre, it is presented through cinematic 3D sequences, composed by a dedicated cinematographer.

== Development and release ==
The game is developed by the Australian studio Route 59, using the Unity game engine. The visual style of the 3D cinematics was influenced by anime. The game was originally announced for release in October 2017 for Microsoft Windows and MacOS, but was delayed to July 22, 2020. The game was released on August 11, 2021 for Nintendo Switch. The composer for the project is Kevin Penkin.

== Reception ==
=== Pre-release ===
In pre-release coverage, multiple critics praised the game's presentation. Nathan Grayson at Kotaku and Kyle LeClair at Hardcore Gamer both compared it to the Japanese developer Atlus's titles, with Grayson describing it as stylish and like Persona in a coffee shop, and LeClair saying that the anime-like aesthetics, the music and the atmosphere "wouldn't seem out of place in a top-level Atlus game". Rock, Paper, Shotgun's Kate Gray said that the game looks "so good you just want to eat [it]", praising the sunset-like color palette used and comparing it to the visual style of the game Firewatch. Joel Couture of Siliconera called the art style "striking", with its use of 3D art rather than the traditional animation and static 2D images common to the visual novel genre. Gray, while noting that it was difficult to pinpoint the exact tone intended from just the trailer, also said that she liked the concept of a coffee shop visited by both the dead and the living, and LeClair said that the environment interaction and investigation shown in the trailer felt like they were setting up an interesting mystery.

=== Release ===
Reception

Aggregate scores
Aggregator	Score
Metacritic	81/100 (PC)
OpenCritic	78% recommend

Review scores
Publication	Score
Destructoid	9/10
Edge	7/10
Game Informer	8/10
GameSpot	7/10
IGN	8/10
PC Gamer (US)	80/100
USgamer	4/5

Necrobarista received "generally favorable" reviews, according to review aggregator website Metacritic. Fellow review aggregator OpenCritic assessed that the game received strong approval, being recommended by 78% of critics. USGamer selected it as their Game of the Month for July 2020, calling it "one of the more memorable visual novels I've played this year, if not ever".

The game's narrative and visuals received critical acclaim. Jody Macgregor, writing for PC Gamer, gave Necrobarista an 80 out of 100, saying “It's presented gorgeously, the camera finding interesting angles for every scene”. GameGrin's reviewer gave it a perfect score, calling it "a moving experience that you would be a fool to pass on". Bella Blondeau of TheGamer, also giving Necrobarista a perfect score, praised the game's "uncomfortable" discussions around death and grief, saying the result was "perhaps one of the highest forms of art I can think of."

Necrobarista's gameplay received mixed reception. Reviewers singled out its "keyword" system, used for unlocking side content, as being confusing and difficult to navigate. GameSpot's Jordan Ramée cited it as a negative element of the game's experience, mentioning that "[there's] no sense of victory in earning the necessary fragment points you need to unlock side stories, as it's mostly guesswork".

Awards
Year	Awards	Category	Result	Ref.
2020	Australian Game Developer Awards	Best Art	Won	
2020	Golden Joystick Awards	Best Indie game	Nominated	
2020	IND13 Awards	Best writing	Nominated	
2019	Freeplay Awards	Excellence in Art	Won	
