= Balor Games =

American video game publisher

- Formerly: Humble Games (2020-2026)
- Type: Subsidiary
- Industry: Video games
- Founded: May 14, 2020; 6 years ago
- Parent: Ziff Davis (2020-2026); Good Games Group (2026-present)

Balor Games is an American video game publisher. Formerly known as Humble Games, it originated from publishing services run by Humble Bundle that started in 2017, and was founded as its own publishing division in 2020.

In July 2024, Humble Bundle's owner Ziff Davis restructured the division and laid off all of its staff. In 2026, Good Games Group, founded by former Humble Games heads, acquired the Humble Games label and rebranded it as Balor Games.

== History ==
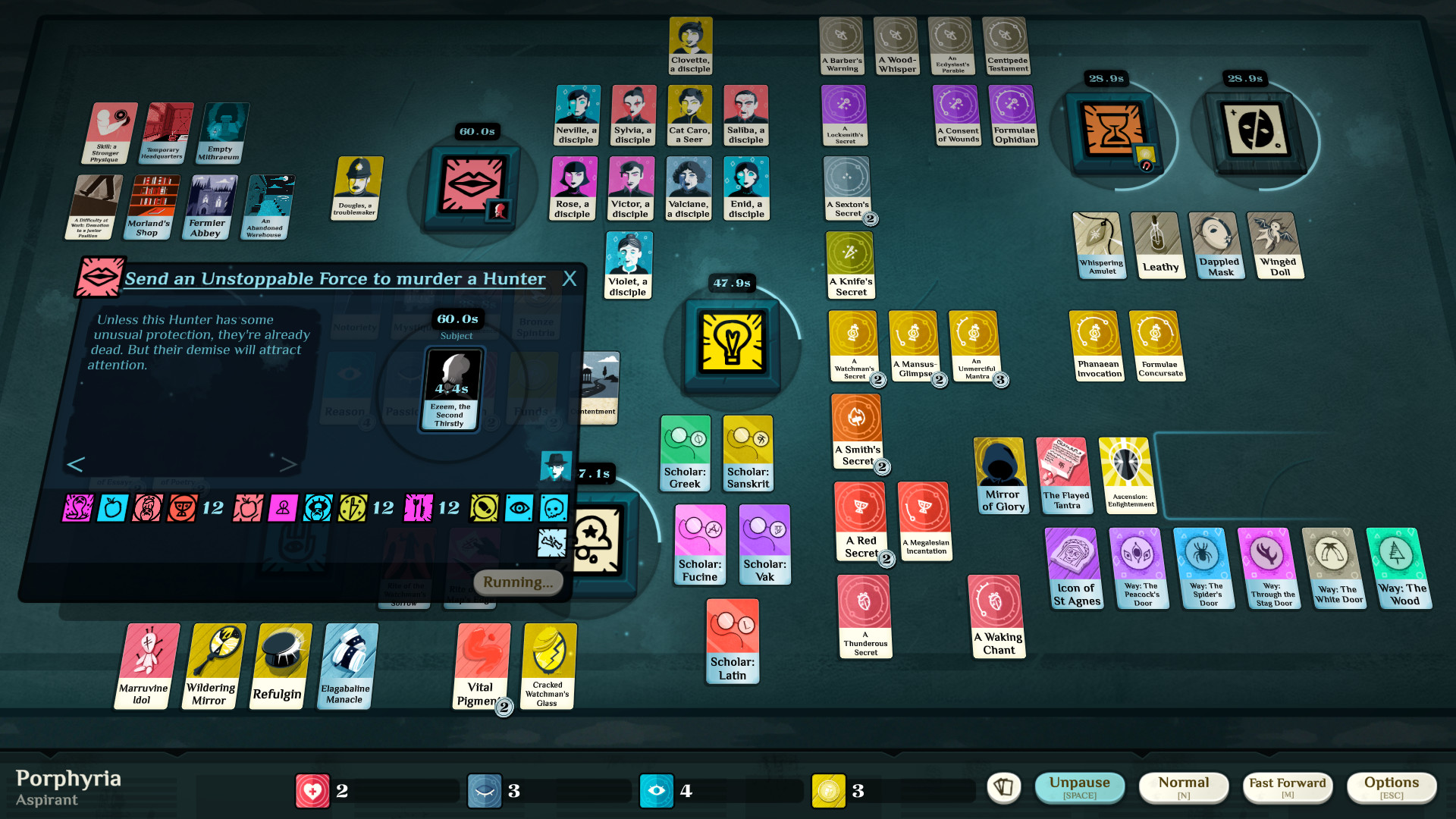
Cultist Simulator was published by Humble in 2018.

In February 2017, Humble Bundle announced that it would begin to offer publisher services to developers across multiple platforms, including computer, console, and mobile devices, building upon its existing suite of services. Such games, such as A Hat in Time, were given a "Presented by Humble Bundle" label. Humble Bundle's lead for the publishing effort, John Polson, said that developers are able to pick and choose a selection of options that Humble Bundle can offer, recognizing that few publishing models are able to meet the vastly different needs of developers. Humble rebranded its publishing division as Humble Games in May 2020.

In June 2020, Humble Bundle announced a Black Game Developer Fund to provide funding, production and marketing support via Humble Games to black game developers. On July 23, 2024, Humble Games laid off its 36-person staff. Humble stated that it was restructuring with the intent to continue operations amidst statements by former staff members that the company had been shut down. Steve Horowitz, president of parent company Ziff Davis, told staff it had tried to sell Humble Games on two occasions, citing long delays and rising costs, before deciding on layoffs. Remaining projects would be completed by a third-party company called The Powell Group. Former employees criticized Ziff Davis, a media company, for not understanding how to properly run a game publisher.

Former Humble Games heads, Alan Patmore and Mark Nash, established Good Games Group in 2024. On 5 March 2026, the company acquired Ziff Davis' publishing business and founded a publishing label, Balor Games. This deal included the back catalog of titles published under the Humble Games label.

== Works ==
Year	Title	Developer	Note(s)	Ref.
2017	A Hat in Time	Gears for Breakfast	Self-published on PC	
2018	Aegis Defenders	GUTS Department		
2018	Wizard of Legend	Contingent 99		
2018	Wandersong	Greg Lobanov, A Shell in the Pit		
2019	Slay the Spire	Mega Crit Games	Early access in 2017, fully released in 2019	
2019	The Occupation	White Paper Games		
2019	Staxel	Plukit		
2019	Forager	HopFrog		
2019	Void Bastards	Blue Manchu		
2019	Crying Suns	Alt Shift		
2019	Supraland	Supra Games	Self-published on PC	
2020	One Step From Eden	Thomas Moon Kang		
2020	Wildfire	Sneaky Bastards		
2020	Fae Tactics	Endless Fluff Games		
2020	Popup Dungeon	Triple B Titles		
2020	Floor 13: Deep State	Oversight Productions		
2020	Ikenfell	Happy Ray Games		
2020	Ring of Pain	Simon Boxer, Twice Different		
2020	Carto	Sunhead Games		
2020	Project Wingman	Sector D2		
2021	The Wild at Heart	Moonlight Kids		
2021	Dodgeball Academia	Pocket Trap		
2021	Into the Pit	Nullpointer Games		
2021	Flynn: Son of Crimson	Studio Thunderhorse		
2021	Unsighted	Studio Pixel Punk		
2021	Unpacking	Witch Beam		
2021	Next Space Rebels	Studio Floris Kaayk		
2021	Archvale	idoz & phops		
2022	Supraland Six Inches Under	Supra Games		
2022	Chinatown Detective Agency	General Interactive Co.	Co-published by WhisperGames on PC	
2022	Temtem	Crema	Early access in January 2020, fully released on September 6, 2022	
2022	Moonscars	Black Mermaid		
2022	Midnight Fight Express	Jacob Dzwinel		
2022	Prodeus	Bounding Box Software	Early access in November 2020 on PC, fully released on September 22, 2022	
2022	Ghost Song	Old Moon		
2022	Infinite Guitars	Nikko Nikko		
2022	SIGNALIS	rose-engine	Co-published by PLAYISM on PC and Nintendo Switch	
2023	Protodroid Delta	Adam Kareem		
2023	Infinite Guitars	Nikko Nikko		
2023	Stray Gods: The Roleplaying Musical	Summerfall Studios		
2023	Mineko's Night Market	Meowza Games		
2023	Temtem: Showdown	Crema		
2023	The Iron Oath	Curious Panda Games	Version 1.0 released	
2023	Coral Island	Stairway Games	Early access in October 2022 on PC, fully released in November 2023	
2023	While the Iron's Hot	Bontemps Games		
2024	Hauntii	Moonloop Games		
2024	It's Only Money	Usual Suspects Studios		
2024	Rolling Hills	Catch & Release		
2024	Bushiden	Pixel Arc Studios		
2024	Bō: Path of the Teal Lotus	Squid Shock Studios	Final game to be published by Humble Games	
2024	#Blud	Exit 73 Studios		
2024	On Your Tail	Memorable Games		
2025	Lost Skies	Bossa Games		
2025	Monaco 2	Pocketwatch Games		
2025	Wizard of Legend II	Dead Mage		
2026	Wild Blue Skies	Chuhai Labs, Vitei Backroom		
2026	Sponge Break	Goose Byte		
2026	Town of Zoz	Studio Pixanoh		
TBA	Billie Bust Up	Giddy Goat Games		
TBA	Never Alone 2	E-Line Media		
TBA	Threads of Time	Riyo Games		
