= Thirteenth floor (disambiguation) =

The thirteenth floor of a building is often omitted because of superstition.

Thirteenth Floor, 13th Floor, Floor Thirteen, or Floor 13 may also refer to:

== Film ==
- The Thirteenth Floor, a 1999 science fiction film
- 13th Floor, a 2005 Indian film directed by Luke Kenny
- The 13th Floor (1988 film), a 1988 Australian horror film

== Music ==
=== Bands ===
- 13th Floor, an incarnation of the American rock band the Grass Roots
- Floor Thirteen (band), a Canadian alternative rock band

=== Albums ===
- 13th Floor (album), a 2019 album by Haviah Mighty
- The 13th Floor (album), a 2009 album by Sirenia

=== Songs ===
- "13th Floor", a song by Mondo Generator from the 2000 album Cocaine Rodeo
- "Floor 13" (song), a 2019 song by Machine Gun Kelly

== Video games ==
- Floor 13 (video game), a 1992 video game
- Floor 13: Deep State, a 2020 video game

== Other uses ==
- The Thirteenth Floor (comic), a British comic strip
- The 13th Floor, a 1995 novel by Sid Fleischman
- "The Thirteenth Floor", an episode of the television series Wizards vs Aliens

== See also ==
- The 13th Floor Elevators, an American rock band
