= Carto =

Carto may refer to:

- Carto (video game)
- Cardiac electrophysiology
- Carto (company)
- R v Carto, lawsuit
- Willis Carto (1926–2015), political advocate
- Carto, the default rendering layer of OpenStreetMap
