= Ghost Song =

Ghost Song may refer to:

- Ghost Song (video game), 2022
- "Ghost Song", by Air from The Virgin Suicides
- "Ghost Song", by the Doors from An American Prayer
- "The Ghost Song", by Calvert & West
- Ghost Song (album), 2023 by jazz vocalist Cécile McLorin Salvant
- Ghost Song (film), a 2026 German fantasy drama

== See also ==
- Ghost Songs, one half of the 2005 Tim Rogers and the Temperance Union double album Dirty Ron/Ghost Songs
