= Moonscars =

Platform video game

- Developer: Black Mermaid
- Publisher: Humble Games
- Engine: Unity
- Platforms: Microsoft Windows; PlayStation 4; Nintendo Switch; PlayStation 5; Xbox One; Xbox Series X/S
- Release: September 27, 2022
- Genre: Action-Platformer
- Mode: Single-player

Moonscars is a 2022 platform game developed by Black Mermaid and published by Humble Games. The game was released on September 27, 2022 for Microsoft Windows, PlayStation 4, PlayStation 5, Xbox Series X/S, Nintendo Switch, and Xbox One. In the game, players control a warrior named Grey Irma, who searches for her maker, the Sculptor. The game received generally positive reviews on release.

== Gameplay ==
Moonscars is a 2D Side-scrolling platform game with Soulslike elements. Players take control of Grey Irma, a warrior made of clay and bone, who must track down her maker, a being called the Sculptor. To find the Sculptor, Irma must fight through a world inhabited by creatures made of clay, where most human civilization is in ruins. Irma can defeat enemies by attacking them with her broadsword, which can cut through multiple enemies at once. Irma can also dodge or parry enemy attacks, with a parry giving the player the opportunity to both hit and push back an enemy. Each time Irma damages an enemy, she gains Ichor, which can be spent to regain hit points. Ichor can also be spent to attack with magical abilities, called Witchery. Each time Irma dies, she is resurrected at the last checkpoint the player used, and the power of enemies is increased. To alleviate this increase in enemy strength, the player able to acquire items called Glands from slaying monsters, which they can use to reduce the game's difficulty.

== Reception ==
Reception

Aggregate score
Aggregator	Score
Metacritic	75/100 (PC); 71/100 (PS5); 65/100 (NS)

Review scores
Publication	Score
Jeuxvideo.com	15/20
Nintendo Life	7/10
TouchArcade	3.5/5
IGN Italy	7.4/10
IGN Japan	7/10

According to review aggregator website Metacritic, the PC version of Moonscars has received "generally favorable reviews", while the PlayStation 5 and Switch versions have received "Mixed or average reviews". Nintendo World Report rated the game a 5/10, praising the game's art style and options in combat, but criticizing the high level of difficulty and the rarity of the Gland items. Rock Paper Shotgun similarly praised the artsyle and compared the game to Castlevania, but considered the Blood Moon mechanic of increased difficulty to be a punishing addition. Nintendo Life said that the game was reminiscent of Dead Cells and liked how it deviated from other Soulslike games with its combat, but found the game's difficulty to be frustrating.
