= Ether One =

2014 video game

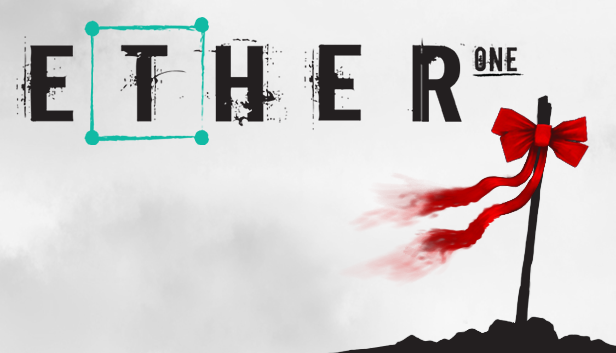
- Promotional artwork
- Developer: White Paper Games
- Publisher: White Paper Games
- Director: Pete Bottomley
- Designer: Pete Bottomley
- Programmer: David Smith
- Writers: Nathaniel-Jorden Apostol; Pete Bottomley; Benjamin Hill
- Composer: Nathaniel-Jorden Apostol
- Engine: Unreal Engine 3; Unreal Engine 4 (Redux and PS4)
- Platforms: Microsoft Windows; PlayStation 4
- Release: 25 March 2014: Microsoft Windows; WW: 25 March 2014 PlayStation 4; WW: 5 April 2015
- Genre: Adventure
- Mode: Single-player

Ether One is a 2014 first-person adventure game developed and self-published by White Paper Games, a Manchester-based studio. The gameplay is set within a virtual world, where players assume the role of a "Restorer", tasked with reconstructing the memories of a dementia patient. As the studio's debut title, Ether One focuses on exploration, puzzle-solving, and narrative, featuring themes centered around mental illness and memory retrieval.

The game features a non-linear exploration style, allowing players to explore the harbour town of Pinwheel and its surroundings at their own pace. The primary goal is to collect red ribbons tied to objects to unlock "core memories". Players solve puzzles scattered throughout the game, which become increasingly complex and are designed to reflect the symptoms of dementia. These challenges are optional, enabling players to focus on the narrative if they prefer. The plot of Ether One revolves around the Restorer's mission to delve into the mind of Jean Thompson, a 69-year-old woman diagnosed with dementia. As the Restorer explores Jean's memories, they gradually uncover the history of the town of Pinwheel, Jean's personal life, and a tragic mining accident. As the story progresses, it is revealed that the Restorer is actually Thomas, Jean's husband, who is attempting to cure his own dementia. The game took approximately three years to complete and was influenced by games such as Dear Esther and Myst. The team went through numerous gameplay and narrative iterations before settling on the final version. They incorporated their own personal experiences with family members into the game's depiction of mental illness.

Ether One was originally released for Microsoft Windows on 25 March 2014. It received generally favourable reviews, with critics praising its atmospheric and immersive experience. However, the narrative and puzzle mechanics received mixed feedback, with some reviewers finding the story fragmented and the puzzles cumbersome. The game's depiction of dementia was noted for its realism. A PlayStation 4 version was released on 5 May 2015, which rebuilt the entire game in Unreal Engine 4, allowing for graphical enhancements and additional language support. These improvements were later brought to the Windows version in a free Redux update on 28 October 2015.

== Gameplay ==
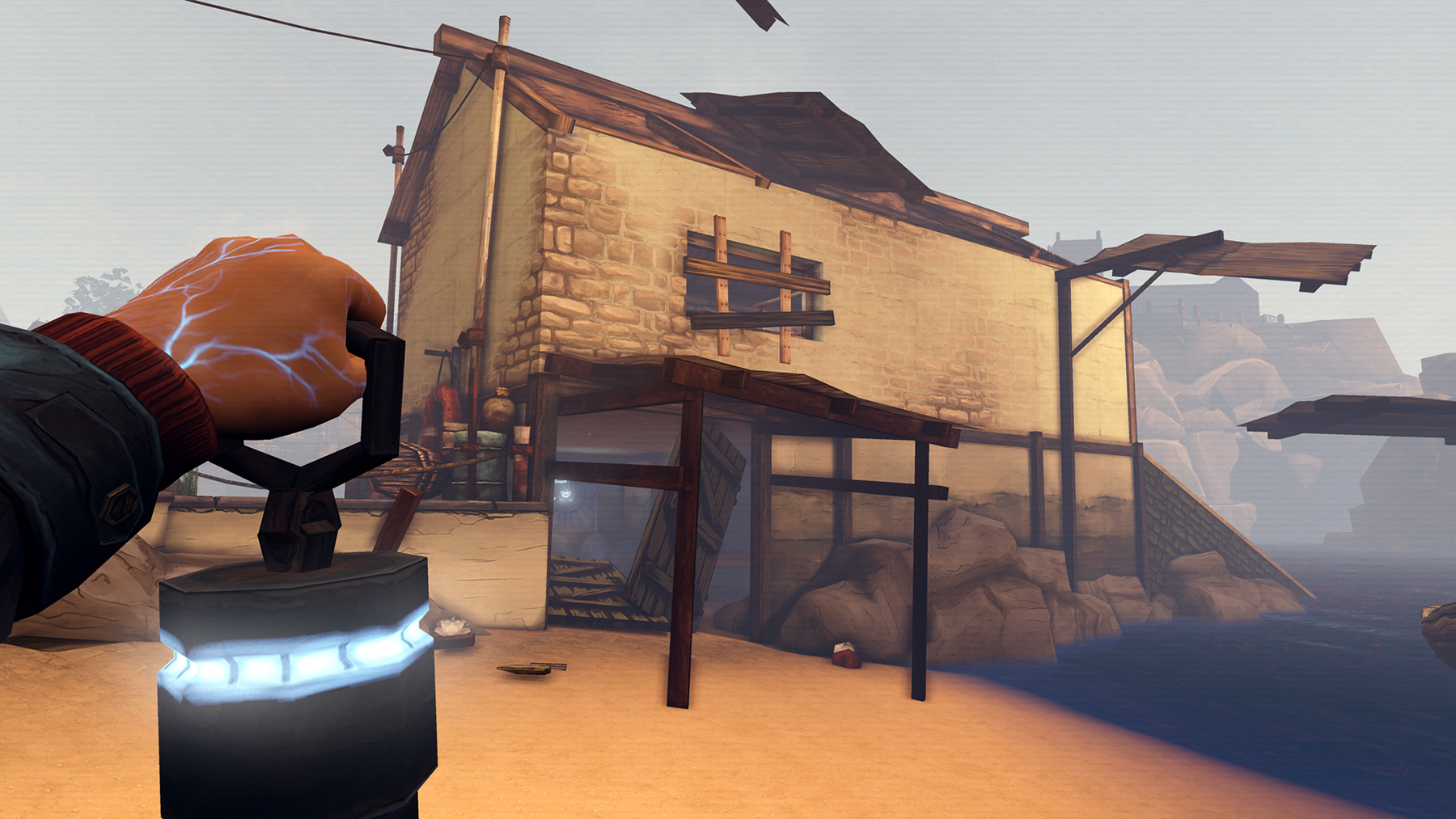
In Ether One, the player assumes the role of a "Restorer", an individual with the ability to project themself into the mind of someone that is mentally ill.

Ether One is a first-person adventure game, with a focus on exploration. The player controls a "Restorer", an individual with the ability to project himself into the mind of someone suffering from mental illness, in the hopes of restoring their memories. Gradually, the player makes sense of the patient's chronology and reassembles the timeline of events, aided by mysterious artifacts that appear in the various memory simulations. After the game's premise is introduced, access to the harbour-side town of Pinwheel, the game's central location, is allowed to the player. The town features many buildings that the player is encouraged to explore in order to retrieve memories. Other explorable locations throughout the game include industrial mines and factories. The player's primary objective is to collect red bows tied to objects. Players can explore at their own pace, although to actually progress through the game, ten red ribbons must be located in each location. Accomplishing this unlocks a "core memory", which is then entered to take photographs of important objects from the client's past.

Movie projectors can also be found in various locations. A broken projector on the floor indicates a puzzle; once a puzzle has been solved, the memory it represents can be played back. Puzzles may involve physical tasks, such as completing a shipment of cider, while others are more mentally labouring in nature. One puzzle for example involves the lighting of a furnace, which requires the player to correctly adjust the switches, add a particular chemical, and time nearby clock rotations correctly to control its connected object. The puzzles become more difficult and obtuse throughout the game, simulating the chaos and difficulty of a person suffering from dementia. These puzzles are optional, and the player can therefore choose to ignore puzzles and focus on the story and locations if they desire. Previous areas can also be returned to at a later point, to fill in gaps in puzzles. The game can take up to around 20 hours to fully complete at a leisurely pace, although it can also be completed in less than five hours if the player chooses to ignore puzzles. The game is largely story-driven, and aside from some mild profanity, contains no questionable content, such as violence or sexual content. A tutorial narration feature can be optionally enabled.

=== Depiction of dementia ===
Ether One prominently addresses the subject of dementia, with gameplay mechanics intentionally designed to reflect symptoms of the condition. Players have the ability to teleport to a hub area called "The Case", a virtual room where objects collected from memories can be stored. Many of these items are of little relevance to the game's plot, encouraging players to collect a diverse array of objects and underscoring the uncertainty of what may be significant. Some items are deliberately well-hidden, adding a layer of difficulty to their discovery. As players dictate the pace of their exploration, the narrative gradually becomes clearer with the uncovering of memories, notes, and phone recordings in each location. This narrative approach further immerses the player in the experience and fosters empathy for those affected by the condition.

== Plot ==
Ether One begins with an introduction to the Restorer, an employee at a futuristic memory-retrieval company known as the Ether Institute of Telepathic Medicine. The Restorer’s mission is to delve into the mind of Jean Thompson, a 69-year-old woman diagnosed with dementia, to recover her lost memories. The Institute has the capability to generate 3D simulations of damaged memories, and the Restorer must reconstruct them using the fragments that remain. The project is led by Dr. Phyllis Edmunds, who guides the Restorer through the memories. She warns that the project is on the verge of losing its funding and that Jean’s case will either secure or endanger the future of the Institute.

Once inside Jean’s mind, the Restorer navigates her childhood memories of Pinwheel, a seaside village in England that heavily relies on tin and iron mining. Throughout the journey, the Restorer learns about the village’s residents, a tragic mining accident that claimed the lives of many citizens, and Jean’s growing relationship with a boy named Thomas, whom she eventually marries. While rebuilding the memories, the Restorer encounters gem-like stones that represent the dementia they are trying to eliminate. They must destroy these stones using the “Artifact,” a lamp capable of erasing dementia from the mind.

As the process continues, the patient’s mind becomes increasingly unstable. It is revealed through a series of flashbacks and revelations that the Restorer is actually Thomas. It is also made known that he is not inside Jean’s mind but his own, attempting to cure himself of his dementia. Thomas had worked with Jean’s father in the mines, and although Thomas managed to escape the deadly collapse, the father did not, leaving Thomas filled with guilt. Thomas’s worsening condition and Jean’s subsequent passing led him to create a fantasy world. Their son, Jim, admitted him to a memory therapy clinic, where Dr. Edmunds worked to restore his memories and halt the progression of dementia. With her help, and with memories of Jean encouraging him, Thomas navigates through his traumatic childhood, where his mother left his alcoholic father (who later died in a home accident). He is able to free himself from his fantasy world, curing his dementia and making the project a success. Afterward, Thomas is released to Jim’s care and expresses gratitude to Dr. Edmunds for all her help.

== Development ==
Ether One was developed by a core team of six at White Paper Games, a studio based in Manchester. This was the studio's debut game. Several team members met at university and began collaborating on ideas that led to Ether One's conception in 2011; the studio was officially formed in 2012. The game was influenced by the studio's desire to create "rich, narrative experiences" and game designer Pete Bottomley's goal to craft a story in which he could personally invest. In the planning stages, the team prototyped "50 or 60" puzzles, discarding those that could not be integrated engagingly into the level design. The game also underwent numerous conceptual changes, starting as an action platformer before the team shifted focus to exploration. The narrative also evolved through several iterations, including a more science fiction-themed version.

The development process for Ether One was considered "quite long" for a first game. The team began development with a £25,000 loan, which was used to hire a programmer experienced with Unreal Engine 3 and to prepare for a commercial release. A virtual reality version was initially planned using an early Oculus Rift development kit, but later scrapped. Each team member specialized in a unique discipline, which helped streamline development. Aware of their small size, the team decided not to pursue high fidelity in graphics, instead focusing on pragmatic visual choices for what appeared on-screen. During development, the prominence of a particular lighthouse location in the narrative increased, leading the team to enhance its visual presence in the game so that players could almost always see it in the distance. Nathaniel-Jorden Apostol composed the game's soundtrack, later made available for purchase on Bandcamp. His prior experience with experimental music informed a freeform approach to the game's composition, with each level featuring its own unique melody and instrumentation. Some voiceover audio was recorded on iPhones, requiring other audio in the same scene to be downgraded in quality to match.

Bottomley found it challenging to simultaneously establish the studio and develop Ether One. The team lacked experience with development best practices, such as source control, and relied on a pen drive to store the latest version of the game. They encountered limitations with Unreal Engine 3 tools, which necessitated creative problem-solving. To optimize performance for the original PlayStation 4 version, the team removed large sections of levels to address unoptimized assets. Additionally, the team initially lacked their own internet connection, relying on an Ethernet cable from an upstairs neighbor and uploading Steam builds from a corridor. Some of the development work was conducted remotely using services like Skype.

The game's ending was refined just several weeks before release, particularly its treatment of dementia. The game released for Windows on March 25, 2014. Following the game's release, the team took a break, later commenting that their "brains were fried" from years of continuous development. In a retrospective documentary for the game's tenth anniversary, Bottomley revealed that the title (originally Ether) was initially chosen for a planned three-part trilogy, a plan later abandoned when the team decided to combine the trilogy's content into one game. During the promotion of their next game, The Occupation, the company stated they "learnt a lot" from producing Ether One. The two games are set in the same universe.

=== Gameplay direction ===
Bottomley and the team had to "carefully balance" the player's awareness of the character and the rules that bound gameplay, writing that it "wouldn't be fair" on the player to spend time solving puzzles if one could break at any time. The game's harbour in the town of Pinwheel was completely rebuilt more than five times during development. The game features no multiplayer mode. A Mac version of the game was planned, but shelved due to performance issues.

Dear Esther and other games served as inspiration for the development team.

Benni Hill, the game's story director, cited Myst and Dear Esther as inspirations for the team during development. He further explained that the game's evolution was "organic" and that the team's plans changed frequently; he attributed this partially to the game being the studio's first effort. Regarding the game's portrayal of dementia, Bottomley stated that the team did not aim to necessarily raise awareness of the disease, but rather to start a dialogue and put the player in the perspective of someone suffering from it. Many members of the development team had family members that struggled with dementia, which informed the decision to focus on the disease. Members of the team drew from their own experiences as development continued, incorporating personal stories into the writing. The team incorporated visual metaphors for the disease into the game, such as "ether rocks" that are destroyed by the player, which mirror the shape of a Lewy body inside the brain of a dementia sufferer.

=== PlayStation 4 edition and Redux ===
On 14 August 2014, White Paper Games announced a PlayStation 4 edition of Ether One. The company also announced that the PlayStation 4 edition would be rebuilt from scratch in Unreal Engine 4. Bottomley ruled out a possible Xbox One port, saying:

There's not really much to say. Sony contacted us first and were really excited about getting Ether One onto the platform. It feels like a good partnership and the whole PlayStation team has been great to work with. No one from Xbox has contacted us and none of the team are Xbox players so it wasn't really a consideration.

The change in game engines and platforms brought a number of technical challenges for White Paper Games. Apostol said that the "realisation" that the game would have to be rebuilt in a new game engine motivated the studio. The company also received assistance and support from the creators of Unreal Engine 4, Epic Games. Apostol announced that the PC version would be ported to Unreal Engine 4 in a later update, once the team had fixed any console-specific issues. This update later became Redux.

The game was released to PlayStation Plus subscribers for free as part of the "Instant Game Collection" on 5 May 2015. Sony approached White Paper Games regarding the deal, an event that Apostol called "a dream come true". The game also received a retail release on Blu-ray Disc in September, in both standard and steel case editions.

On 28 October 2015, White Paper Games released Ether One Redux for free to all users that had previously purchased Ether One on Steam. The update featured little gameplay and narrative changes, but updated the gameplay engine to Unreal Engine 4 for added graphical fidelity and parity with the PlayStation 4 port. The update also added French, German, Spanish, Italian and Polish subtitles.

== Reception ==
Reception

Aggregate score
Aggregator	Score
Metacritic	PC: 82/100; PS4: 75/100

Review scores
Publication	Score
Destructoid	9/10
GameRevolution	4.5/5
IGN	7.9/10
Joystiq	4/5
PC Gamer (US)	82/100

Ether One received "generally favorable" reviews from critics, according to the review aggregator website Metacritic, with an average score of 82/100 for the PC version and 75/100 for the PlayStation 4 version. Reviewers frequently praised the game's atmosphere and immersive experience. Sam Prell of Joystiq highlighted the haunting quality of the environments, and favourably compared the game's narrative structure to the 1939 film The Wizard of Oz. Kotaku noted that Ether One evoked the feel of a '90s adventure game. Richard Cobbett of IGN admired how the game crafted a "hauntingly cryptic atmosphere", gradually revealing the town of Pinwheel for exploration.

The narrative, however, divided critics. Cobbett felt that the story's fragmented and confusing delivery suited the central theme of dementia and its unfolding revelations. Phil Goins of Geeks Under Grace also noted the game's occasional detachment, attributing this to its cumbersome puzzle-solving mechanics. Angus Morrison of PC Gamer described the narrative as a "tragic saga of dementia, death, and industrial decline" that players discover rather than are told. However, Morrison criticized the ending as unnecessary. Prell offered both praise and criticism, noting that while the plot occasionally dropped threads, it was cohesive enough to make players empathize with the Restorer's plight. Chris Priestman of Kill Screen called the story "very Dickensian," while John Walker of Rock Paper Shotgun observed that the puzzles began as fulfilling and grounded but became more obtuse and dull as the game progressed.

The game was compared to Myst by several reviewers.

Many reviewers compared the game to the 1993 puzzle game Myst. Morrison noted that Ether One's puzzles were less challenging, suggesting that when players were stumped, they were often missing the obvious, which he described as the "Holy Grail" for an adventure puzzle game. Game Revolution asserted that Ether One was closer to Myst in style and execution than any other game. The game's portrayal of dementia was also well-received. Joey Thurmond of Push Square commended the game for educating players about the condition while remaining entertaining. Michael Thomsen of The New Yorker appreciated the game's mechanics, which simulated cognitive degradation by encouraging "hoarding". However, he also remarked on the difficulty of balancing accurate portrayals of conditions with engaging gameplay, suggesting the game offered limited new insights into dementia. Hansen of Destructoid praised the simulation of the condition, describing the game's approach as a reverse Eternal Sunshine of the Spotless Mind. He also praised its lack of violence, noting that with the absence of weapons, Ether One differed from other exploratory games like The Stanley Parable or Gone Home. Robert Workman of GameCrate criticized the slow pacing of certain puzzles, stating they were drawn out to the point of frustration, and lamented the absence of a hint system. Goins criticised the game's graphics but praised its sound and art direction. Corey Motley of GameCritics.com found the environments confusingly large due to the lack of an in-game map.
