= Mineko's Night Market =

2023 video game

- Developer: Meowza Games
- Publisher: Humble Games
- Engine: Unity
- Platforms: Nintendo Switch; Windows; PlayStation 4; PlayStation 5; Xbox One; Xbox Series X/S
- Release: WW: September 26, 2023
- Genre: Business simulation
- Mode: Single-player

Mineko's Night Market is a 2023 business simulation video game developed by Meowza Games and published by Humble Games for Windows and Switch. Players control a young girl tasked with revitalizing a local market.

== Gameplay ==
Players control a girl named Mineko who moves to small Japanese island that has fallen on economic hardship. They are tasked with revitalizing the market by selling crafts and encouraging other vendors to set up shop. Along the way, players gather resources to make items to sell, do quests for their neighbors, and investigate rumors of Nikko, a spirit cat who is worshiped locally. Players can rescue cats captured by government agents also investigating Nikko.

== Development ==
Developer Meowza Games is based in Vancouver, Canada. Humble Games released Mineko's Night Market for Windows and Switch on September 26, 2023. Ports for Xbox One and PlayStation 4 and 5 were released on October 26, 2023.

== Reception ==
Mineko's Night Market received mixed reviews on Metacritic. Though they praised the art, PC Gamer criticized the "muddled gameplay and conflicted writing" and said it should have focused more strongly on either. IGN described it as "an adorable little sim that could've been cozy" but forces players to engage in too much grinding. Comparing it negatively to the Animal Crossing series, Rock Paper Shotgun criticized what they felt were "tedious crafting, soulless resource crafting", and dull fetch quests. Hardcore Gamer called it a "truly impressive life sim", praising its graphics, depiction of Japanese culture, and story. Nintendo World Report praised the art style and crafting, but they said the Switch version had poor performance that made it hard to recommend until a patch is released. Siliconera wrote, "Mineko's Night Market has a great story, fantastic vibes, and fun concept, but the balancing and Switch performance issues are hassle."
