= Floor 13: Deep State =

2020 video game

Floor 13 : Deep State
- Developer: Oversight Productions
- Publisher: Humble Games
- Producer: Shahid Ahmad
- Designer: David J Eastman
- Artists: Bismuth Works Ltd; Sarah Anne Langton
- Composer: Len J J Cheung
- Engine: Unity 3D
- Platforms: Windows, MacOS
- Release: November 2020
- Genres: Adventure, strategy
- Mode: Single-player

Floor 13: Deep state is a strategy video game published by Humble Games in 2020. The game is set in the United Kingdom, where the player is the director of a secret governmental agency involved in clandestine domestic operations; the headquarters is hidden on the thirteenth floor of a city building near London Docklands, hence the title. The game was developed by the same team that produced Floor 13 in November 1991. The game is self-described as a "dynamic document-driven dystopia".

== Plot ==
The player takes on the role of the Director General of the Ministry of Agriculture and Fisheries, an Executive Agency that conceals a secret police which keeps the government popular by any means necessary. Answering only to the Prime Minister, the Director General has the power to use wiretapping, surveillance, smear tactics, disinformation, burglary, kidnapping, torture, and assassination to keep the government popular with the people.

The game contains numerous references to real-world groups, trends, scandals, and unusual occurrences that were newsworthy in the 1980s and early 1990s, including the Irish Troubles, Shining Path, the BCCI scandal, and the apparent suicides of Roberto Calvi and Jonathan Moyle.

== Gameplay ==
The game is menu-driven and presents the player with scenarios through reports viewable in the Director General's office each day. Each scenario represents a potential scandal that may hurt the government's popularity if not properly handled by the player. The player interacts with the game by issuing orders to eight different departments which represent the capabilities available to the Director General (such as surveillance, assassination, interrogation, or disinformation) to use those capabilities against individuals, locations, or groups involved in each scenario. Once each day's reports are read and any orders have been issued, the player can advance to the next day to see the results of their orders and the progress of scenarios. Each scenario is scripted and will generally always proceed in the same way absent the player's intervention (with minor details such as names and pictures of individuals changed), but some results of the player's orders are randomized (for example, assassination attempts may fail or interrogation of individuals may or may not reveal particular information). Each individual or group is rated in the reports as to prominence, power, and orientation towards the government, attributes that will affect the likelihood of success of attempted actions taken against them and the likely results on public opinion. Some scenarios have multiple possible resolutions depending on what means the player chooses to use, and may also generate positive press, raising the government's popularity, if handled well.

During the course of the game, there are two possible ways to lose. Every 14 days, the Prime Minister reviews the opinion polls and will fire the player if the government's approval rating is under 50%. If the player is too severe in using aggressive means that attract unwelcome public attention, the player will be retired. If the government still has the lead in the polls after the review period, the player will be given more money or employees to work with. With luck, the player can temporarily keep their job by spying on and ignoring or discrediting suspects without using more severe and obvious methods such as "removal", "interrogation", or "heavy assault".

== Reception ==
The game received mixed reviews. While the reviewers were very positive over the premise, the atmosphere, and the artwork, they believed the UI and the general difficulty were too unfriendly.
