= Supraland =

2019 video game

- Developer: Supra Games
- Publishers: Supra Games; Humble Games (consoles)
- Engine: Unreal Engine 4
- Platforms: Windows; Nintendo Switch; PlayStation 4; Xbox One
- Release: Windows; WW: April 5, 2019; Nintendo Switch, PlayStation 4, Xbox One; WW: October 22, 2020
- Genres: Metroidvania, puzzle video game
- Mode: Single-player

Supraland is a 2020 metroidvania-styled video game developed by Supra Games. The game was originally self-published for PC and left early access on April 5, 2019. Ports for the eighth generation of video game consoles, with Humble Games as publisher, were released on October 22, 2020. Players assume control of a toy figurine and explore a series of themed areas within a child's sandbox.

Supraland is primarily developed by Supra Games founder David Münnich, who wanted to create an adventure video game based primarily on the Metroidvania subgenre, which is primarily characterized by guided non-linearity as well as utility-gated exploration and progression mechanics. Supraland is played from a first-person perspective, which Münnich believes allows players to provide a superior sense of immersion within the in-game world as opposed to one that is played from a third-person perspective.

Supraland was met with mostly positive reviews, which praised the game's gameplay mechanics. A standalone expansion, titled Supraland Six Inches Under, was released on January 14, 2022, and serves as a sequel to Supraland. A full-fledged sequel is currently under development.

== Gameplay ==
In Supraland, the player controls a toy figurine who has come to life. The prince of a kingdom populated by "red people", the player character is tasked with uncovering why his people's water supply has been tampered with by "blue people" from a neighbouring kingdom. Played from a first-person perspective, the entirety of Supraland's levels are set within a child's sandbox, with each area segregated by a theme. The gameplay of Supraland, primarily inspired by the conventions and mechanics of the Metroidvania subgenre, also blends disparate elements from multiple genres like puzzle video games, point-and-click games, and first-person shooter games. Players are not provided with a map to navigate the in-game world: instead, large objects in the distant horizon provide visual cues for navigation. They serve as landmarks for players to orient themselves and deduce the appropriate direction to travel in order to reach their objective.

== Plot ==
Supraland is set within a child's sandbox, where tiny playdough figurine civilizations, the Red and Blue People, live separately and in conflict. At the center of local legend is a mysterious figure named Mr. Miracle, whose true color is debated by both sides.

When Red Town's water supply runs dry. Under orders from his father, King Pavo, the Red Prince sets out to investigate. Armed with a basic sword, he discovers that the neighboring Blue Ville has tampered with the water pipes. Surprised and confused, Pavo sends the Prince and his mother Fanny to Blue Ville to speak with its ruler, King Paul. As the Prince ventures across the sandbox world, he traverses a series of themed regions and gains powerful new tools, such as the Force Cube and a special gun. Along the way, he battles grave-born monsters and fiery creatures from volcanic rifts, ultimately facing off against the formidable Rattle Hag. However, upon reaching Blue Ville, he is ambushed by his blue cousin and stripped of his gear.

After retrieving his items, a confrontation unfolds between Fanny and King Paul. It is revealed that Paul spread rumors about the Reds after Fanny left him for his twin brother, Pavo. Paul admits that Blue Ville's own water source has dried up due to mysterious volcano monsters, but was too ashamed to ask for help. Fanny, unimpressed by Paul's excuses, sends the Prince to investigate the volcanic disturbances.

The Prince journeys into the volcanic region, rescues his cousin, and collects three green moons needed to unlock a hidden path. There, he encounters the enigmatic Mr. Miracle, revealed to be a Purple person who has remained hidden behind elaborate obstacles. Mr. Miracle explains that he secluded himself to avoid interference and reveals the cause of the water shortage to be a massive, creature nicknamed the “Farting Meat Bag" blocking the stream. Using his knowledge that flies are attracted to orange, the Prince turns the creature orange, luring flies to consume it and restore the water flow. With the crisis resolved, tensions between the Red and Blue kingdoms are eased. Mr. Miracle reveals himself to the public and turns out to be the father of both Pavo and Paul.

== Development and release ==
Supraland was developed by Supra Games founder, German video game developer David Münnich, across 16 months. Supra Games previously developed Supraball, a free-to-play multiplayer sports game based on an early 2000s' mod for the video game Unreal Tournament, which features a similar cartoon graphic aesthetic.

Münnich's initial idea for Supraland was to create a first-person action-adventure game. At the preliminary stage of his research, Münnich played his favourite video games and made a shortlist of every gameplay element he liked, before refining the list down to a small number of essential elements which Münnich described as the "Supraland formula". The final version of Supraland is described as a cross between Portal, The Legend of Zelda, and the Metroid series. Among the most important aspects of Supraland's gameplay is puzzle solving; Münnich aspired for Supraland's puzzle gameplay to reach the same standard of tactile quality as that of Portal.

The choice of a first-person perspective for Supraland is considered an unusual design choice for a Metroidvania-styled video game. Further, the lack of a map to assist players with navigation is a "central design decision" according to Münnich. In an interview with PC Gamer, he described maps to be a source of comfort, but also a feature that degrades an entire 3D world to "meaningless geometry". For Supraland, he wanted to encourage players to "follow their natural curiosity without much guidance", and that they could discover a sense of immersion and satisfaction by being mindful and observant of their surroundings.

The original Windows version of Supraland left Steam Early Access and saw a full release on April 5, 2019. Ports for the PlayStation 4, Xbox One, and Nintendo Switch are published by Humble Games and released on October 22, 2020. A downloadable content (DLC) expansion, titled Supraland Crash, was released on July 3, 2020.

== Reception ==
Reception

Aggregate score
Aggregator	Score
Metacritic	(PC) 85/100 (Xbox) 82/100

Review scores
Publication	Score
Game Informer	8/10
Nintendo World Report	6/10
Shacknews	9/10

According to review aggregator website Metacritic, the PC and Xbox One versions of Supraland has received generally favorable reviews. Writing for Rock, Paper, Shotgun, John Walker declared Supraland to be his favourite video game of 2019. Reviewing the original PC version of Supraland, Kyle Hilliard from Game Informer praised its puzzle design and expansive in-game world which rewards exploration, which offsets its otherwise underwhelming production values in his opinion. In a positive review for the Xbox One version, Donovan Erskine from Shacknews lauded Supraland as one of the best sandbox video games he has ever played and described it as an essential experience for open world video game enthusiasts because it lets players define their own experiences. He praised its gameplay, which "Feels like a love letter to a laundry list of classic games, doing justice to all of them", but also highlighted the lackluster design aesthetic for its characters and in-game items. John Rairdin from NintendoWorldReport offered a less enthusiastic assessment of Supraland, summarizing the gameplay experience as a "gorgeous world to stumble through." Rairdin faulted the world design of Supraland for dragging down every other aspect of the game, and complained that its "fun moments" and "great idea" are constantly impaired by "confused wandering through what ought to be a much more interesting world".

Supraland sold 50,000 units within one month of its post-early access release in April 2019, which far exceeded Münnich's own expectations, and 96% of its Steam user reviews were positive. By March 10, 2021, Supraland reached over 600,000 unique players which prompted Dustin Bailey to describe the game as a "cult hit".

== Sequels ==
A sequel titled Supraland Six Inches Under was released for Windows on January 14, 2022. Supraland Six Inches Under was originally intended to be the second DLC expansion pack for Supraland, but its expanded scope and the perceived lack of interest from Supraland players in DLC led to Münnich's decision to develop it as a standalone title.

A second sequel, titled Supraworld, is under development, with funding to be sourced from the crowdfunding platform Kickstarter. Unlike its predecessor, Supraworld is not a solo operation, as Münnich secured the services of a combat designer and a narrative designer as of May 2019.
