= Studio Thunderhorse =

American independent game studio

- Company type: Subsidiary
- Industry: Video games
- Founded: 2015; 10 years ago
- Founders: Simon Filip; Case Portman (Co)
- Defunct: October 23, 2024; 4 months ago
- Headquarters: Roseville, California, U.S.
- Area served: Worldwide
- Products: Flynn: Son of Crimson; Raccoon Rascals; Samurai Blitz
- Website: thunderhorse.co

Studio Thunderhorse was an independent game studio based in Roseville, California. The company was founded in 2015 by Simon Filip and specializes in 2D games inspired by the 90s era of gaming.

The studio's first major title, Flynn: Son of Crimson, was released in September 2021. It was published by Humble Games and is available on PC and consoles.

On October 23, 2024, Studio Thunderhorse announced its closure.

== Games ==
On July 2, 2015, Studio Thunderhorse released their first mobile game on iOS, Samurai Blitz, with a second game, Raccoon Rascals, following in November 2015. With the success of their first two mobile titles, Studio Thunderhorse began development work on their first major title for PC and consoles, Flynn: Son of Crimson, a pixel art action platform game.

=== Flynn: Son of Crimson ===
After a successful Kickstarter campaign and five years of development, Flynn: Son of Crimson was released on Sept 15th, 2021, on Microsoft Windows, PlayStation 4, Xbox One, and Nintendo Switch.

The game is a 2D action platformer with titular character, Flynn, and his giant mythical dog companion, Dex, embarking on a journey of discovery and conflict as they learn to master the art of Crimson Energy. Flynn and Dex must save the world of Rosantica before the evil from The Scourge claims their home.

In an interview with games news and reviews website, Game Rant, Studio Thunderhorse hinted that they may work on a sequel to the game in the future, or follow one of the game's characters in a brand-new adventure.

=== Raccoon Rascals ===
Raccoon Rascals was the studio's second mobile game and was released in November 2015 on iOS. The game is described as a 'one button' adventure with single tap game play. Players take control of a greedy raccoon character as it scales buildings and collects pies. The game has over 20 unlockable characters and multiple achievements.

=== Samurai Blitz ===
Samurai Blitz was the studio's first mobile game and was released in July 2015 on iOS. The game features 40 quests in 8 different environments and is described as an 'action-packed slash n’ dash arcade-style adventure'.

Players praised the game's retro pixel art style and gameplay, but some commented on it being stingy with its coin economy. Review website, What To Play, gave the game a 'Good' play score of 8.60 based on reviews submitted.

The game had its first major update in October 2015, which included additional content, pets, and more powerful equipment.
