= On Your Tail =

2024 video game

- Promotional artwork
- Developer: Memorable Games
- Publisher: Balor Games
- Director: Mauro Fanelli
- Producer: Andrea Marchi
- Designers: Chiara Sanviti; Luca Lanzellotti
- Programmer: Leonardo Formichetti
- Writers: Mauro Fanelli; Fabio Zanetta; Francesco Filippi
- Composer: Pietro Milanesi
- Engine: Unity
- Platforms: Windows; Nintendo Switch
- Release: Windows: WW: December 16, 2024; Nintendo Switch: WW: March 13, 2025
- Genres: Adventure, life simulation
- Mode: Single-player

On Your Tail is a mystery adventure life simulation video game developed by Italian indie studio Memorable Games and published by Balor Games. It was released on December 16, 2024 on Windows, which was followed by a Nintendo Switch port on March 13, 2025, with the latter being a timed console exclusive.

== Premise ==
The game follows the audacious goat writer Diana Caproni in the fictional scenic Italian seaside village of Borgo Marina as she uncovers some of the area's mystifying local mysteries.

== Development ==
On Your Tail was developed by Memorable Games, an independent development studio from Italy. The game was first unveiled in Nintendo's Indie World showcase presentation in November 2023. During Summer Game Fest 2024 in June, a limited-run playable demo was announced and made available on Steam, only until June 17. Originally slated for Steam release on November 21, 2024, the game was pushed back to December 16. The Switch port was also pushed from its original February 2025 window, and is now set to release on March 13.

Original publisher Humble Games ceased operations in July 2024, with third-party company The Powell Group taking over publishing duties for future game launches.

== Reception ==
Reception

Aggregate score
| Aggregator | Score |
|---|---|
| Metacritic | 73/100 |

Review scores
| Publication | Score |
|---|---|
| Hardcore Gamer | 3.5/5 |
| CGMagazine | 8/10 |

On Your Tail received "mixed or average" from critics, according to review aggregator Metacritic.

Kyle LeClair from Hardcore Gamer rated the game 3.5 out of 5, praising the "colorful characters" and "gorgeous setting" whilst criticizing its "card-based mechanics during the detective segments a bit infuriating".

=== Accolades ===
| Date | Award | Category | Result | Ref. |
|---|---|---|---|---|
| January 11, 2025 | The VGMag Awards | Best Italian Game | Won | |
