= Floor 13 (video game) =

1992 video game

- Developer: PSI Software
- Publisher: Virgin Games
- Producer: Andrew Wright
- Designer: David Eastman
- Programmer: Shahid Ahmad
- Artist: Carl Cropley
- Composer: Shahid Ahmad
- Platforms: Amiga, MS-DOS
- Release: 1992
- Genre: Strategy
- Mode: Single-player

Floor 13 is a strategy video game developed by PSI Software for Amiga and MS-DOS. It was published by Virgin Games in 1991. The game set in the United Kingdom, where the player is the director of a secret governmental agency involved in clandestine domestic operations; the headquarters is hidden on the thirteenth floor of a bank building in London Docklands, hence the title. A follow-up, Floor 13: Deep State, was released in November 2020.

== Plot ==
The player takes on the role of the Director General of the "Department of Agriculture and Fisheries", a non-existent executive agency that conceals a secret police which keeps the government popular by any means necessary. Answering only to the Prime Minister, the Director General has the power to use wiretapping, surveillance, smear tactics, disinformation, burglary, kidnapping, torture, and assassination to keep the government popular with the people.

In addition to the Director General's regular duties suppressing and removing those who threaten the status quo, there is a subplot involving his membership in a secret society called "The Secret Masters of Thoth". These missions, which are received from a "Secret Master" wearing the vestments of an Egyptian pharaoh, involve more bizarre opposition than regular missions; these missions include protecting a fellow member from a Mafia assassination, foiling an attempt to subvert the nation by pod people in key positions, the protection of the Church of the SubGenius from a scandal, and restraining the growing power of the Illuminati, among others.

The game contains numerous references to real-world groups, trends, scandals, and unusual occurrences that were newsworthy in the 1980s and early 1990s, including the Irish Troubles, Shining Path, the BCCI scandal, and the apparent suicides of Roberto Calvi and Jonathan Moyle.

== Gameplay ==
The game is menu-driven and presents the player with scenarios through reports viewable in the Director General's office each day. Each scenario represents a potential scandal that may hurt the government's popularity if not properly handled by the player. The player interacts with the game by issuing orders to eight different departments which represent the capabilities available to the Director General (such as surveillance, assassination, interrogation, or disinformation) to use those capabilities against individuals, locations, or groups involved in each scenario. Once each day's reports are read and any orders have been issued, the player can advance to the next day to see the results of their orders and the progress of scenarios. Each scenario is scripted and will generally always proceed in the same way absent the player's intervention (with minor details such as names and pictures of individuals changed), but some of the results of the player's orders are randomised (for example, assassination attempts may fail or interrogation of individuals may or may not reveal particular information). Each individual or group is rated in the reports as to prominence, power, and orientation towards the government, attributes that will affect the likelihood of success of attempted actions taken against them and the likely results on public opinion. Some scenarios have multiple possible resolutions depending on what means the player chooses to use, and may also generate positive press, raising the government's popularity, if handled well.

During the course of the game, there are two possible ways to lose. Every 21 days, the Prime Minister reviews the opinion polls and will fire the player if the government's approval rating is under 50%. If the player is too severe in using aggressive means that attract unwelcome public attention, the player will be fired by 'Mr. Garcia', an assassin sent by the Prime Minister, and thrown out of their office window. If the government still has the lead in the polls every 21 days, the player will be given more money and employees to work with. With luck, the player can temporarily keep their job by spying on and ignoring or discrediting suspects without using more severe and obvious methods such as "removal", "interrogation" or "heavy assault"; however, if the player is clumsy or blatant, the Prime Minister will increasingly threaten the player with death.

If the player manages to avoid being fired, then the game has two possible successful endings. If the player has successfully navigated through every scandal encountered for an entire year while keeping the approval rating above 50%, the government realises that the player knows too much and appoints him or her Prime Minister, with a final note to "enjoy it while it lasts". The other ending involves successfully completing all seven Secret Master missions; in this ending, the player is anointed the new head of the Secret Masters of Thoth and the face of the character is shown.

== Reception ==
Computer Gaming World's Charles Ardai called Floor 13 "the most unpleasant espionage game ever made", comparing it to a James Bond fan's reaction to Casino Royale ("It is simply handled poorly"). Beyond disliking the KGB or Gestapo-like "loathsome secret police activity" the game depicted, he wrote of the gameplay that "Hannah Arendt could not have conceived of more banal evil. Floor 13 turns acts of unmitigated cruelty into bloodless, arm's length bureaucratic functions ... a type and quality of gameplay that was obsolete in 1978".

Cara Ellison mentions the game as it appears in the Internet Archive, pointing out that it seems quite modern. It "simulates the detached bureaucracy a totalitarian government would have to put in place to actually control things, making you increasingly aware that this might be why governments recruit such boring rich people"
