= The Iron Oath =

- Developer: Curious Panda Games
- Publisher: Humble Games
- Composer: Alex Roe
- Engine: Unity
- Platforms: macOS; Windows
- Release: WW: November 2, 2023
- Genre: Tactical role-playing
- Mode: Single-player

The Iron Oath is a 2023 tactical role-playing video game developed by Curious Panda Games and published by Humble Games. Players manage a mercenary company, complete quests, engage in turn-based combat, and can optionally follow a revenge-themed main story. It entered early access in 2022 and is available for Windows and macOS.

== Gameplay ==
Players run a mercenary company in a fantasy world. The world changes as time goes on, such as the various kingdoms declaring war on each other or dragons attacking cities. Random events can also change the world, and these events can be unique to specific geographical region. Travel takes place on an overworld map.

Mercenaries age as time progresses, and old mercenaries may retire. Players must also keep their morale up and feed them. As they become more experienced, mercenaries require higher salaries. Failing to pay mercenaries, or making choices that they disagree with during quests, can cause them to permanently leave the mercenary company. Each mercenary has a class that grants them unique abilities in a skill tree.

Combat is turn-based and tactical and follows the XCOM remake series streamlined system of allowing movement and one action per turn. Mercenary jobs can involve simple escort quests that do not necessarily involve combat, or combat-heavy quests that require a dungeon crawl. Dungeons become more difficult and impose harsher penalties as players spend more time exploring them. The main quest involves seeking vengeance for a betrayal, but it can be ignored if players wish. If they ignore these quests for too long, players may miss out on being able to follow up on them. It uses retro pixel art graphics.

== Development ==
Developer Curious Panda Games is based in the United States. raised double their crowdfunding goal of $45K in 2017. The Iron Oath entered early access on April 19, 2022. Humble Games released it for macOS and Windows on November 2, 2023.

== Reception ==
Rock Paper Shotgun enjoyed The Iron Oath and said that it had the potential to be a great tactical role-playing game. However, they had many issues with the early access build they tried in April 2022. They felt dungeon exploration was a bit complex and difficult to understand, and that dungeons themselves were made arbitrarily difficult because of the penalties and time limits. They also felt important information was not readily available, and they criticized how some of it was presented. Polygon also reviewed The Iron Oath during its first month in early access. They enjoyed having to make difficult decisions and praised the combat. However, they disliked the user interface and hoped that would be worked on during its early access period.

Compared to Battle Brothers, PC Gamer said it is less gritty and has more of a focus on narrative. They enjoyed the story and how reactive it was players' actions, and they said that The Iron Oath's treatment of character death as impactful made it so. However, they said the early access version of May 2022 was less of a sandbox than Battle Brothers. They also criticized the lack of content, which they said was a common issue among early access games. At the same time, they believed it to have a lot of promise and to already be engrossing. RPGFan compared the story to Dragon Age: Origins, which they posited as an influence, and said the dungeon exploration is similar to Darkest Dungeon. However, they said it was "very enjoyable" and, as of May 2022, was determined to go in its own direction. Also reviewing the game in May 2022, RPGamer praised the management, combat, and exploration.
