= Chinatown Detective Agency =

2022 video game

- Developer: General Interactive Co.
- Publishers: General Interactive Co.; Humble Games (consoles)
- Engine: Unity
- Platforms: Microsoft Windows; macOS; Nintendo Switch; Xbox One
- Release: April 7, 2022
- Genres: Adventure, point-and-click
- Mode: Single-player

Chinatown Detective Agency is a 2022 point-and-click adventure game developed by General Interactive Co. that was released on April 7, 2022 for Microsoft Windows, macOS, Nintendo Switch and Xbox One. The game launched a Kickstarter campaign in March 2020, with a demo being released in September. The game is set in a cyberpunk version of Singapore in 2037.

== Plot ==
The game's main character is a former Interpol officer named Amira Darma, who is beginning a new career as a private investigator based in Singapore's Chinatown district. Following a referral from her former boss, her first case is for a businessman trying to locate an accountant who has fled the country. Subsequently, she takes on a series of cases from a wealthy heir to return stamps from his philatelist father's collection to their originating countries. As she solves cases across the world, she begins to unravel a web of conspiracies back at home.

== Gameplay ==
The gameplay is heavily inspired by the Carmen Sandiego series. As in Carmen Sandiego games, players travel to various countries to accomplish various tasks and trail criminals. Similarly, the use of outside knowledge or reference resources is necessary to solve the game's puzzles, and factual trivia is occasionally presented by the characters. Gameplay also involves more traditional video game puzzles, such as code breaking.

== Development and release ==
General Interactive Co. was founded in 2016 in Singapore by Mark Fillon, though its team is now based around the world, including the United Kingdom and Brazil. The studio released its first game, Terroir, in 2017, and began development of Chinatown Detective Agency that year.

A free alpha-level demo was released on Itch.io in March 2020. A Kickstarter campaign for the game was successfully funded the following month, on April 28, 2020. The game features voice acting, with Singaporean and Malaysian voice actors cast for all the Singaporean characters. The original demo was succeeded by an extended prologue, subtitled Day One, on Steam and Itch.io in September 2020. The full game was then released on April 7, 2022.

== Reception ==
Reception

Aggregate score
Aggregator	Score
Metacritic	PC: 66/100; XONE: 68/100

Review scores
Publication	Score
GameSpot	7/10
Hardcore Gamer	3.5/5
Nintendo World Report	9/10
PC Gamer (US)	75/100
RPGFan	58/100
VentureBeat	3/5

Chinatown Detective Agency received "mixed or average" reviews according to review aggregator Metacritic. Alice Bell, in a mostly positive review for Rock Paper Shotgun, praised the game for its "different take on tired cyberpunk settings" as well as its cast and use of puzzles. Bell also criticized the game for frustrating moments, noting that puzzles could sometimes "feel like doing homework".

In a mixed review for PC Gamer, Alexis Ong praised the game's depiction of a future Singapore while faulting it for inconsistencies, such as divergences in the quality of the writing at different points. Ong, a Singaporean, wrote that it was "really fucking cool to explore [her] home city in pixels" and stressed the significance of the game including specific details drawn from life in the city, such as Singlish.
