= The Wild at Heart =

2021 video game

- Developer: Moonlight Kids
- Publisher: Humble Games
- Engine: Unity
- Platforms: Windows; macOS; Xbox One; Xbox Series X/S; Nintendo Switch; PlayStation 4
- Release: Windows, macOS, Xbox One, Xbox Series X/S; May 20, 2021; Switch, PlayStation 4 November 16, 2021
- Genre: Adventure
- Mode: Single-player

The Wild at Heart is an open world exploration video game developed by Moonlight Kids and published by Humble Games. It was released on May 20, 2021, for Windows, macOS, Xbox One, Xbox Series X/S, Nintendo Switch, and PlayStation 4. It follows two runaway children as they unravel the mysteries of a lost realm.

The game was well-received by critics for its artwork and music, although some aspects of its gameplay were criticized.

== Gameplay ==
During the game, the player can explore in a non-linear fashion. The game's combat is largely focused on making use of spritelings and their abilities. Each type of spritelings has strengths and weaknesses that can be used to battle more effectively. The player characters have little means of direct action but need to avoid taking too much damage from the various monsters that attack.

The game uses spritelings to accomplish various puzzles and gather resources for upgrades. Various types of spritelings can be used to accomplish various goals and can be prioritized for each situation. The number of them that can be used at once is limited.

== Plot ==
The player controls two runaway children who embark on a journey of self-discovery. By exploring the game's hidden forest, the runaways encounter several characters known as Greenshields that will help them in their battle against the darkness that is trying to take over the world.

== Development and release ==
Early development began in 2017/2018 with initial art style, characters and story concepts being completed by Moonlight Kids, a small team spread between Portland and Atlanta. The Wild at Heart took 2 years and 9 months to develop, from the formation of Moonlight Kids to the game's release. A demo was shown at the ID@Xbox event at the Game Developers Conference in San Francisco; it featured a young boy named Wake walking through a dreamlike environment before getting dropped into a fantastical world full of monsters.

Moonlight Kids worked alongside publisher, Humble Games, who provided financial support during production. The original soundtrack was composed by artist Amos Roddy. The Wild at Heart was initially released on May 19, 2021, for Windows, MacOS, and Xbox. It was later released on November 16, 2021, for Nintendo Switch.

== Reception ==
Reception

Aggregate score
Aggregator	Score
Metacritic	PC: 76/100; PS4: 75/100

Review scores
Publication	Score
Eurogamer	8/10
Hardcore Gamer	3/5
Nintendo Life	8/10
Play	6/10

=== Critical reception ===
The Wild at Heart received an aggregate score of 76/100 from Metacritic, indicating "generally favorable" reviews. Ollie Reynolds of Nintendo Life rated the game 8 stars out of 10, calling its visuals "stunning" and its music "lovely", but called some aspects of combat "frustrating". Stefania Netti of Eurogamer Italia also rated the game 8/10 points, similarly calling it a stunning experience. Kyle LeClair of Hardcore Gamer rated the game 3/5 points, calling it fun and whimsical but criticizing its "excessive mechanics".

The game has drawn comparisons to the Pikmin games series for its combination of real-time strategy and puzzle elements. Variety described the game as being "‘Pikmin’ Meets ‘Luigi’s Mansion’".

=== Awards and accolades ===
The Wild at Heart was officially selected during Day of the Devs 2018, and Indie Mega Booth for both GDC 2019 and PAX 2020. It was awarded the Nyx Game Awards Best Indie Game Gold award and Best Visual Artwork Grand Prize award for 2021.

The game was also nominated for the Independent Games Festival Excellence in Visual Arts award for 2022, SXSW Gaming's Indie of the Year award for 2022, SXSW Gaming's Excellence in Animation, Art, and Visual Achievement for 2022.
