= Flynn: Son of Crimson =

2021 video game

- Developer: Studio Thunderhorse
- Publisher: Humble Games
- Designers: Simon Filip; Case Portman
- Programmer: Case Portman
- Artists: Phil Giarrusso; Hunter Russell; Jaya Ply; Shawn Martins; Johan Aronson
- Writer: Simon Filip
- Composer: Jacob Lincke
- Platforms: Windows; PlayStation 4; Xbox One; Nintendo Switch
- Release: September 15, 2021
- Genre: Platform
- Mode: Single-player

Flynn: Son of Crimson is a platform game developed by Studio Thunderhorse and published by Humble Games. The game follows a young boy named Flynn, who embarks on a journey of discovery and conflict alongside his animal companion Dex as he learns to master his powers. Flynn and Dex must save Rosantica before the evil from The Scourge claims his home.

The game was released on September 15, 2021 on Microsoft Windows, PlayStation 4, Xbox One and Nintendo Switch. Flynn: Son of Crimson was successfully crowdfunded on Kickstarter on October 24, 2017, raising over $63,000.

== Gameplay ==
Flynn: Son of Crimson features fast-paced combat with a wealth of hard-hitting attack combos. There are over 40 unique stages, each with varying challenges and mechanics. Players can collect gems to then unlock and upgrade brand new skills to accommodate their playstyle. In most stages, players encounter many different enemies, including carnivorous plants, goblins, rabid wolves and giant insects. Minibosses and tougher enemies soon enter the stage in the form of environment-specific knights and Scourge knights. Dealing with some enemies in Flynn: Son of Crimson can be as simple as dodge-rolling at the right moment to avoid incoming attacks, then dealing damage from behind or by using more advanced techniques, such as freezing them in place or instantly stunning them with electric magic. A stun meter is introduced early in the game and is used throughout to allow players to build up a yellow gauge above the enemy until it becomes stunned (shown by dizzying stars) for a few seconds. Doing so allows for multiple safe attacks without enemy retaliation.

Along with close range melee combat, players are introduced to ranged magic fireballs very early on, which can provide an alternate way to defeat some enemies at a safe distance. Ranged magic is unlimited but considerably weaker than close range combat. Flynn eventually gains access to a charged version of ranged magic, with players holding the button to charge up a more powerful shot, releasing it at an opportune moment. Charged magic is also upgraded with elemental effects, including ice, electric and fire.

Throughout the adventure, players collect Crimson gems. Non-player characters (NPCs) throughout the game offer hints about Flynn's past and occasionally give players small tasks in exchange for gems or keys, which unlock challenge levels located in each region of the game map. Players may visit a NPC named Loretta at any point in the village of Sanctia, the game's main hub area, to trade gems in exchange for learning new skills. Players may sell any relics they find to another NPC named Yombal for 1,000 gems.

== Plot ==
Flynn: Son of Crimson tells its story through NPC dialogue and short, comic-like images. The game's story begins as Flynn is taking a nap outside his home on Cardinal Island, a quaint, somewhat isolated part of the mainland, Rosantica. He is given the small task of taking his loyal, mythical dog Dex out for her walk whilst also taking Bohrin's (the first NPC in the game) wooden sword out to practice and trim some overgrown vines. Heather is pleased when they arrive, calling Dex a "good girl".

During this time, Flynn and Dex take another nap after meeting with a second helping of mainline NPCs (Heather, Bax and Beagy). Soon after a small amount of progression through Cardinal Island, Dex meets an antagonistic character named Rozia. The initial fight with Rozia starts off as a scripted, unwinnable battle that eventually leads to Flynn acquiring the first Crimson weaponry. Once the fight is over, Rozia then proceeds to drain Dex of her 4 guardian spirits. This starts the main story progression.

== Development ==
Developed by Studio Thunderhorse over the span of 5 years, Flynn: Son of Crimson began to take form in late 2016. After working on 2 smaller games for iOS, the team moved onto the larger, more ambitious project. The game started out as a larger, sprawling metroidvania and was partially shown in a Kickstarter demo. This early design choice however was changed mid-2018 to a more straightforward approach, including a stage based map (akin to Super Mario World on the Super Nintendo Entertainment System), allowing the team to focus on interesting level design and progression without in-level backtracking.

In July 2019, Studio Thunderhorse announced their partnership with Humble Games for a publishing deal that funded development from then onwards. Humble Games announced the game to be one of ten Humble Games titles to be released on Xbox Game Pass on day one and released a Release Date trailer for the game on August 31, 2021.

On December 1, 2021, the game had its first major update. Update V1.1 included "Hero Mode", which gives players the opportunity to restart the game with all their learned skills and acquired weapons once they reach 101% completion. The update also included some difficulty tweaks and quality of life improvements.

In March 2022, Studio Thunderhorse announced a partnership with physical games publisher, Super Rare Games, for a limited run of 4,000 physical copies of the game for Nintendo Switch. The physical copies, including full-color manual, interior artwork, exclusive sticker, and trading cards, were officially released on March 24, 2022.

In June 2023, Studio Thunderhorse announced another partnership with Super Rare Games for a limited run of 2,000 physical copies of the game for PlayStation 4. These physical copies, including removable cardboard slipcover, physical disc, exclusive sticker, and full-color manual, were officially released for sale on June 22, 2023.

== Reception ==
Flynn: Son of Crimson received "generally favorable" reviews on review aggregation website, Metacritic.

The game also received reviews from a range of video game media outlets, praising its gameplay, art-style and range of puzzles and weapons.
