= Town of Zoz =

- Developer: Studio Pixanoh
- Publisher: Balor Games
- Platforms: Nintendo Switch; PlayStation 5; Windows; Xbox Series X/S
- Release: Windows; 9 April 2026; PS5, Switch, Xbox Series X/S; TBA
- Genres: Action RPG, farm sim
- Mode: Single-player

Town of Zoz is a 2026 action RPG and farm life sim developed by Studio Pixanoh and published by Balor Games. The game revolves around Ito, a young shaman and adventurer who strives for helping his family's restaurant and solve the spirit crisis in his hometown, Zoz.

Town of Zoz was released on 9 April 2026 for Windows. Console ports for Nintendo Switch, PlayStation 5, and Xbox Series X/S are planned.

== Plot ==
Ito is a young shaman and chef adventurer who has returned to his hometown, Zoz, and elects to help run his family's farm and restaurant. He is with his companion spirit Zee, and wants approval from his father, Conki.

== Gameplay ==
Town of Zoz is an action RPG and farm life sim with elements of cooking. The player controls Ito through various dungeon areas to fight off monsters and solve puzzles. Ito can use his machete to execute a basic combo and utilize special attacks. Ito is assisted in combat by Zee, who targets enemies and possess them, dealing damage over time and utilizing area of effect attacks. Zee can be controlled directly or act on his own articificial intelligence.

The game supportse cooperative gameplay.

== Development and release ==
Town of Zoz was developed by Studio Pixanoh. It drew cultural inspirations from Central American and South American cultures and traditions.

It was first announced on 13 March 2025 during the Humble Showcase by the publisher Humble Games, currently Balor Games. Town of Zoz was released on 9 April 2026 for Windows. Ports for Nintendo Switch, PlayStation 5, and Xbox Series X/S were announced.

== Reception ==
Reception

Aggregate scores
Aggregator	Score
Metacritic	(PC) 70/100
OpenCritic	22% recommend (Note: Based on nine reviews)

The PC version of Town of Zoz received "mixed or average" reviews from critics, according to the review aggregation website Metacritic. Fellow review aggregator OpenCritic assessed that the game received fair approval, being recommended by 22% of critics.

RPGFan and CGMagazine both praised the visual design and the music incorporating a mix of electronic and Latin American influences.
