= Wizard of Legend =

2018 roguelike video game

- Developer: Contingent99
- Publisher: Humble Bundle
- Composer: Dale North
- Engine: Unity 5
- Platforms: Microsoft Windows; macOS; Linux; PlayStation 4; Nintendo Switch; Xbox One; Android; iOS
- Release: May 15, 2018; Android, iOS; October 27, 2023
- Genres: Roguelike, dungeon crawler
- Modes: Single-player, multiplayer

Wizard of Legend is an indie roguelike video game released by American studio Contingent99 and Humble Bundle in May 2018. Funded through Kickstarter in 2016, players take control of a wizard as they traverse a procedurally generated dungeon, using a wide variety of spells to defeat mobs, three major bosses, and a final boss to earn the title "Wizard of Legend". The game received generally favourable reviews. A sequel, titled Wizard of Legend 2, has been released in October 2024 by Dead Mage.

== Gameplay ==
Wizard of Legend is a top-down 2D roguelike game where the player controls a wizard as they attempt to complete a 10-floor procedurally generated dungeon, the 'Chaos Trials', using a selection of various spells to defeat various enemies and bosses and become the titular "Wizard of Legend". Each button or key casts a spell, called 'arcana', in the form of a basic attack, an evade, a 'signature' (more powerful) arcana, and then a variety of alternate spells, called standard arcana, to aid the player in traversing the dungeon and fighting enemies. The dungeon contains three 'shops' per floor to help the player. Two shops are always run by the same NPC, and shops do not appear on floors that have a boss, except the shops just before the final boss. New spells can be bought from a shop that appears on every level of the dungeon with collected money, or added permanently to equip before entering the dungeon through 'Chaos Gems', a persistent currency. Passive upgrades, called Relics, are collected in the same way. The player may also buy different styles of robes, called Outfits, with Chaos Gems, which alter the player's initial stats, such as the player's starting health, defense, or damage. The robe, however, cannot be changed once in the dungeon, it can only be optionally boosted by an NPC. The third 'shop' in a floor is a random NPC, and they have a variety of functions ranging from selling the player relics or arcana to letting the player heal, sell unwanted items, or giving the player increases to some of their stats. Usually the random shop will have a downside for the player to take note of, so it is always best to look out for a potential problem before interacting with one. The player may also interact with a few NPCs prior to entering the dungeon to obtain temporary boosts. The game is completed after completing all floors of the dungeon, defeating three major bosses (wizards representing fire, earth, water, air, and lightning), and defeating the final boss, who represents all the normal elements as well as a special element known as chaos.

== Arcana ==
There are 6 elements that arcana can be based upon: Fire, Air, Earth, Lightning, Water, and Chaos. All arcana, except for chaos, are able to be obtained through the purchase of chaos gems. Chaos arcana are only earned by defeating the final council member, which only rewards you one arcana per trial run. As of update V1.23, there are 36 of each fire, air, earth, lightning, and water arcana, and 24 chaos arcana. Arcana are divided into 4 sub categories: Basic, Dash, Standard, and Signature. The Basic arcana are the most commonly used spell because of their low cooldown. Dash arcana allow you to evade or maneuver around enemies while also dealing damage. Dashes can be used an unlimited number of times, but their special effects will go onto cooldowns. Standard arcana are more powerful, either by dealing more damage or powering up the player. Signature arcana are the same as standard arcana except that they will do amazing damage if you successfully fill up the signature meter. Not all arcana have Signature counterparts, but unlocking Signature arcana will provide the Standard counterpart. Every single arcana aside from chaos arcana also contains an enhanced version, that strengthens the arcana in some way. Equipping a Signature arcana will automatically enhance arcana, but they can also be enhanced by purchasing the enhanced version during the trials, or by equipping relics.

== Chaos Trials ==
The Chaos Trials are a structurally randomized series of rooms that increase in difficulty with each trial beaten. The Chaos Trials are separated into four sections: Three element specific sections, and then the final boss. The first three sections are each themed with one of the five basic arcana mentioned above. Each section consists of three floors – two regular dungeon floors and a boss floor. The regular dungeon floors contain mostly element neutral enemies, but can spawn special enemies that represent the element of the stage. While progressing through the trials, the player may enter a section that locks the player into a room and spawns a small wave of enemies to be defeated. Defeating all enemies may result in a chest that could hold health, gold, and chaos gems, or become a mimic. The normal dungeons will have three shopkeeper characters each denoted by a color which allows the player to expand their arcana, relics, and other items. The end of each stage can be reached by activating and defeating the mini bosses, which all contain enemies spawned accompanying them. At the third stage of each set, you fight the council member which specializes in the element that the level is based on. Each boss has a different skill set based on their arcana and will enter a taunting phase to signify the player to stun and deal damage to them. After the first three sections are completed, the final boss is found as the last trial. The boss is guarded by three arena stages, in which the player fights waves of enemies, and a mini boss before entering the shop section. After the shop, the player has to defeat three stages of the boss before finishing the game and achieving a chaos arcana.

== Development ==
The game was subject to a Kickstarter in June 2016, raising $72,681 from the $50,000 goal. Wizard of Legend was released simultaneously on Microsoft Windows, macOS, Linux, PlayStation 4, Nintendo Switch, and Xbox One on May 15, 2018. Versions for Android and iOS were released on October 27, 2023.

=== Music ===
The soundtrack, composed by Dale North, was first released by Scarlet Moon Records on May 15, 2018, with a complete soundtrack recording on digital and CD mediums release on January 17, 2020. The Prescription for Sleep version, by composers Norihiko Hibino and AYAKI was announced by Scarlet Moon Records on May 18, 2020.

== Reception ==
Reception

Aggregate score
Aggregator	Score
Metacritic	Nintendo Switch: 76/100; PS4: 73/100; Xbox One: 79/100

The game received generally favourable reviews upon its release in May 2018, holding a score of 76/100 on Metacritic. Kevin McClusky of Destructoid awarded it 6/10, saying "Spell effects are beautifully animated, and combat feels fluid and entertaining." but criticised frame skips on the Nintendo Switch edition of the game. Dominic Tarason of Rock, Paper, Shotgun said "Wizard of Legend is a good, if lopsided game. The moment-to-moment combat is highly flexible and seldom anything less than satisfying, especially in co-op.", but criticised the repetition of the dungeon, saying "If you can overlook the repetition in targets and mix up your own playstyle, this one’s an easy recommendation, but for players who stick with the tried-and-tested, Wizard of Legend can slip into monotony."

Bradley Ellis of Easy Allies awarded the game a 7/10, saying "Wizard of Legend nails the feeling of being a grand wizard. Experimenting with all the different spells is a blast, and there are some heart-pounding boss fights. The peripheral elements fail to deepen or expand Wizard of Legend, but the core gameplay makes for a good time if you’re looking to fill a roguelike fix."

The game recorded 300,000 sales by the end of May 2018, having been on sale for 16 days. By the end of July 2018, the game had sold over 500,000 copies.

== Sequel ==
During their Humble Games virtual event in May 2023, Humble Games announced a sequel to the game. Developed by Dead Mage, it was released on the 12th of June 2025.
