= Hauntii =

- Developer: Moonloop Games
- Publisher: Moonloop Games
- Director: Leo Dasso
- Platforms: Windows, Xbox One, Xbox Series X and Series S, PlayStation 4, PlayStation 5
- Release: May 23, 2024
- Genres: adventure, shooter, collectathon, puzzle
- Mode: Single-player

Hauntii is a 2024 twin-stick shooter and adventure game developed and published by Moonloop Games. The game is about loss, love, identity, and detachment, set in a mysterious version of the afterlife called Eternity.

== Plot ==
The player wakes up as a naive little ghost with no memories (named Hauntii), who has just arrived in a spiritual realm called Eternity. Right at the beginning, the player meets a radiant, angelic creature belonging to a mysterious race called the Eternians.

To break these chains and finally ascend, Hauntii must understand who he was in his past life.

As the player explores the different regions, they discover that not all spirits trust the Eternians. While some view them as sacred guides, others regard them with suspicion, adding a layer of mystery to the true nature of that tower and the afterlife itself.

== Gameplay ==
The player plays as a ghost that explores the afterlife. The main mechanic involves shooting souls to possess objects, animals, and enemies, using these abilities to solve puzzles and fight glowing creatures.

== Development ==
Hauntii was developed by Moonloop Games. The core mechanic of "possessing" objects and creatures came about after the developer played Super Mario Odyssey.

The central theme of the story, which focuses on “letting go and moving on,” was directly influenced by Leo Dasso’s personal life. Early in the creative process, he underwent major geographical changes, moving from California to Minnesota and, later, to South Korea.

Initially, the game was supposed to be a more traditional, fast-paced twin-stick shooter. However, the developers realized that the intense action didn't fit with the introspective and profound story they wanted to tell. The developers decided to slow things down by dividing the world into open regions and alternating combat with puzzles and contemplative exploration

=== Soundtrack ===
The soundtrack composed by Michael Ward took on ambitious proportions. Through Symbols of Sound studio, the team was able to hire top-tier Hollywood musicians to record the instruments live.

== Reception ==
Reception

Aggregate scores
Aggregator	Score
Metacritic	(PC) 69 (Nintendo Swiich) 68 (PS5) 81
OpenCritic	75

On the OpenCritic review aggregator, the game maintains a solid average rating and is ranked as one of the most memorable and charming indie experiences of 2024.

The Guardian praised Hauntii as an imaginative and visually stunning debut, highlighting its subversion of the twin-stick shooter genre and its focus on contemplative exploration.
