= Dodgeball Academia =

2021 video game

- Developer: Pocket Trap
- Publisher: Humble Games
- Platforms: Microsoft Windows; Nintendo Switch; Xbox One; Xbox Series X/S; PlayStation 4
- Release: WW: August 5, 2021
- Genres: Sports, role-playing
- Modes: Single-player, multiplayer

Dodgeball Academia is a sports role-playing video game developed by Pocket Trap and published by Humble Games. The game was released on August 5, 2021 for Microsoft Windows, Nintendo Switch, Xbox One, Xbox Series X/S and PlayStation 4. It combines real-time dodgeball gameplay with role-playing elements and a story set at a school dedicated to the sport.

== Gameplay ==
Dodgeball Academia combines sports gameplay with role-playing mechanics. Players control Otto from a top-down perspective while exploring the academy and participating in different dodgeball matches against other students and teams.

Dodgeball matches are played in real time as players throw, catch, and avoid being hit by balls to eliminate opponents. Successfully catching a throw allows players to counterattack with a more powerful throw. Different types of balls and character abilities can be unlocked which add additional strategic options during matches.

Outside of dodgeball matches, players are able to explore the school environment and interact with other students. There are various students who can be added to Otto's team, and each has special abilities that add to strategy during matches.

The campaign is structured around story chapters that combine narrative events, training sessions, and dodgeball competitions as Otto progresses through the academy.

== Development and release ==
Dodgeball Academia was developed by the Brazilian studio Pocket Trap, the creator of Ninjin: Clash of Carrots (2018). The game was announced with a release date of August 5, 2021 for Windows, Nintendo Switch, Xbox One, and Xbox Series X/S.

== Reception ==
Dodgeball Academia received generally favourable reviews from critics according to the review aggregator Metacritic.

Reception

Aggregate score
Aggregator	Score
Metacritic	PC: 77/100; NS: 81/100; PS4: 81/100

Review scores
Publication	Score
Game Informer	9/10
Nintendo Life	6/10
Nintendo World Report	9/10
NME	8/10
RPGFan	8.4/10

The game’s mix of sports and role-playing elements received praise from the critics. The critics praise for the game includes its energetic style and its mix of dodgeball with character development and narrative elements.

Some reviewers also noted the variety provided by different teammates and abilities, which add strategic depth to matches.

However, some critics felt that parts of the game could become repetitive over time, particularly during longer sections of the campaign.
