= The Occupation =

2019 video game

- Developer: White Paper Games
- Publisher: Humble Bundle
- Engine: Unreal Engine 4
- Platforms: PlayStation 4, Xbox One, Microsoft Windows
- Release: 5 March 2019
- Genre: Adventure
- Mode: Single-player

The Occupation is a single-player adventure video game developed by White Paper Games and released on PlayStation 4, Xbox One and Microsoft Windows on 5 March 2019. The game takes place in a single government building, over four hours of real time. The game advances with or without input from the player, but almost all in-game actions can affect the game's story.

The game is set in late 1987, within the same universe as White Paper Games' first title Ether One.

The game was written by Nathaniel-Jorden Apostol, being co-written and edited by Pete Bottomley. Apostol was also the lead audio designer and composer, as well as voicing the character Charles Bowman, the game's central antagonist. Other notable voice actors on the game include Ben Britton, Ally Murphy, David McCallion, Jay Britton and Amelia Tyler.

== Gameplay ==
The game does not have a traditional health bar or energy system. If the player is caught doing something they should not, they are taken to a security office and lose 15 minutes, which shortens the time available to achieve the main objective of the game.

== Plot ==
Prior to the start of the game, a terrorist attack has killed 23 people and led the British government to create the Union Act, a "controversial act which threatens the civil liberties of the British population."

The game's plot starts at 3:27 PM on 24 October 1987, with the player character being a journalist that is researching the Union Act. Players have freedom of choice on how to act; whether it is becoming a whistle-blowing journalist fighting against the act, or doing nothing as the game progresses on its own.

== Development ==
The game was developed on Unreal 4 and uses dynamic artificial intelligence, which combines scripted activities for the in-game characters along with deviations to their normal routine based on their in-game requirements or interactions. The developers illustrated this by explaining the actions of a character called Dan, a Scottish Muslim who is a "towering bald man who screams security". He breaks his usual desk-based routine because of his need to pray at certain times, creating a circumstance that the player can take advantage of should they wish.

== Reception ==
=== Awards ===
The game was nominated for "Best Use of Game Engine" at the Develop:Star Awards.

Reception

Aggregate score
Aggregator	Score
Metacritic	(PC) 68/100 (PS4) 63/100 (XONE) 69/100

Review scores
Publication	Score
Adventure Gamers	2.5/5
Game Informer	6.75/10
GameSpot	8/10
IGN	5.9/10
PC Gamer (US)	67/100
Push Square	6/10
