= Ghost Song (video game) =

2022 video game

- Developer: Old Moon
- Publisher: Humble Games
- Composer: Grant Graham
- Engine: Unity
- Platforms: Microsoft Windows; Nintendo Switch; PlayStation 4; PlayStation 5; Xbox One; Xbox Series X/S
- Release: November 3 2022
- Genre: Metroidvania
- Mode: Single-player

Ghost Song is a 2022 video game developed by Old Moon and published by Humble Games for Microsoft Windows, Nintendo Switch, PlayStation 4, PlayStation 5, Xbox One, and Xbox Series X/S.

== Gameplay ==
Gameplay follows a Metroidvania style format. The game features a system where use of ranged attacks allows the player to increase the strength of their melee attacks.

== Development ==
The studio Old Moon handled development, while Humble Games handled publishing.

Development of Ghost Song began in 2013, with early funding coming from a Kickstarter crowd-funding campaign. A Wii U port was considered, despite incompatibilities between OpenFL and the console. The games Super Metroid and Dark Souls were noted as influences by the developer. Over the course of development, the game was developed in three different fundamental platforms, starting as a Flash game before being ported to the Stencyl engine, before finally being ported to Unity for the release version.

Ghost Song was released on November 3, 2022. The game was made available on Xbox Game Pass on launch.

== Reception ==
Reception

Aggregate scores
Aggregator	Score
Metacritic	PC: 79/100
OpenCritic	69% recommend

Review scores
Publication	Score
Nintendo Life	7/10
PC Gamer (US)	49/100
RPGFan	91/100

Ghost Song received "generally favorable reviews" according to Metacritic. Fellow review aggregator OpenCritic assessed that the game received strong approval, being recommended by 69% of critics. A Rock Paper Shotgun review was overall positive, noting that the game had issues with leading the player. A review from PC Gamer was more critical, noting that the death system of the game was flawed and could lead to a "Catch 22", while also noting that the fundamental systems of the game were sound yet overall repetitive.
