= Carto (video game) =

2020 video game

- Developer: Sunhead Games
- Publisher: Humble Games
- Director: Lee-Kuo Chen
- Composer: Eddie Yu
- Engine: Unity
- Platforms: Windows; PlayStation 4; Xbox One; Nintendo Switch
- Release: October 27, 2020
- Genres: Puzzle, adventure
- Mode: Single-player

Carto is a puzzle adventure game developed by Sunhead Games and published by Humble Games in 2020. It was released in October for Microsoft Windows, PlayStation 4, Xbox One, and Nintendo Switch. The console versions of the game received generally positive reviews, whereas the Windows version received a mixed reception.

== Gameplay ==
Carto is a top-down puzzle adventure game. The player assumes the role of a young girl named Carto, who is separated from her grandmother, a cartographer by profession, during a violent storm. Washed ashore on an island in the aftermath of the storm, Carto must find a way out of her predicament and reunite with her grandmother. Each level of the game involves the player discovering and assembling different pieces of her map, which determines the geography of the surrounding area and progresses the game's narrative. By moving the pieces on the map, players also assist non-player characters (NPC's) with various tasks, such as locating their homes.

== Development ==
Carto was developed by Taiwanese independent studio Sunhead Games and published by Humble Games. The game's setting is inspired by several tribal cultures, which the developers incorporated as references. Lee-Kuo Chen from Sunhead Games cited the French artbook L'Atlas des géographes d'Orbae in particular for teaching him how to create a "believable world". When asked where the idea for the game mechanics came from, Chen noted that the tile-placement mechanic is inspired from the board game genre, especially Carcassonne. Chen said he revisited a concept for a video game which was summarized as "Like Carcassonne, but you are able to travel on the tile you place" within his design notebook, and decided to start prototyping because he thought it sounded promising.

Humble Games unveiled the game in June 2020 with trailer. The game was released for Windows, PlayStation 4, Xbox One and Nintendo Switch on October 27, 2020.

== Reception ==
Reception

Aggregate scores
Aggregator	Score
Metacritic	PC: 72/100; PS4: 75/100; NS: 79/100
OpenCritic	79% recommend

Review scores
Publication	Score
Adventure Gamers	3.5/5
Game Informer	8/10
Nintendo Life	6/10
Push Square	7/10

According to the review aggregation website Metacritic, Carto was generally well received on PlayStation 4 and Nintendo Switch, whereas the Windows version was met with mixed or average reviews. Fellow review aggregator OpenCritic assessed that the game received strong approval, being recommended by 79% of critics.

Marcus Stewart of Game Informer rated the game 8/10, calling it "adorable, pleasant, and deceptively tricky game". He praised the game for introducing new twists on its base gameplay, keeping gameplay "fresh". He further said that the game becomes "surprisingly challenging in good and bad ways".

Stephen Tailby of Push Square rated the game "Good" 7/10, explaining the game to have a "unique gameplay hook". He further went on to say that, "it's not a challenging game, but solving each puzzle is satisfying". He criticised the game for having "so much potential that isn't quite reached here".

Will Aickman of Adventure Gamers rated the game "Good" and gave it 3.5 out of 5 Stars. He explained the game's art saying it has "lush visual style, resembling watercolors from a children's book come to life.". He gave the final verdict as: "It's a bit too relaxed at times, but Carto is full of heart and almost impossibly cute, sending players on a warm, fuzzy journey into the not-so-wild blue yonder to discover what it means to be far from home".
