= R v Carto =

R v Carto is an important case in South African law, heard in the Eastern Districts Local Division on March 12, 1917, with judgment handed down on March 17. Graham JP (who wrote the judgment) and Sampson J were the presiding officers. It is significant for its contribution to the principle of legality, with its stipulation that "to render any act criminal in our law, there must be some punishment affixed to the commission of the act," and that "where no law exists affixing such punishment there is no crime in law."

== Facts ==
By Regulation 30, the Town Council of Grahamstown was empowered, inter alia, to prohibit the watering or irrigation of gardens; by Regulation 45, penalties were provided for behaviour contrary to the regulations, although no special penalty was provided. The Council authorised the board of works, a committee appointed under Grahamstown Municipal Act 18 of 1902, to adopt measures to minimise the daily consumption of water. The board of works passed a resolution to the effect "that a notice should be inserted in the local press prohibiting the use of reservoir water on gardens until further notice." A notice was published in the local press, but not in the Gazette. There was no minute of a report of its resolution by the board of works to the Town Council, and the Town Clerk had no recollection of such a report, but the Mayor stated that the chairman of the board of works had made such a report, when he applied for and obtained the council's authority to prosecute for failure to comply with the resolution.

== Judgment ==
The court held, on appeal, that the council was entitled under the Act to act through the board of works and that there had been a report to and adoption by the Council of the resolution of the board of works. It held further that, if the resolution as reported and adopted could be regarded as a regulation, the prescribed formalities for its promulgation under section 55 of the Act had not been observed. Because, if it be not regarded as a regulation, there was no penalty attaching to a breach of its provisions under either Regulation 30 or 45, the conviction must be quashed.

== See also ==
- Crime in South Africa
- Law of South Africa
- Municipalities of South Africa
- South African criminal law
