= Forager (video game) =

Open world adventure game

- Developer: HopFrog
- Publisher: Humble Bundle
- Designer: Wilmer Willgot
- Engine: GameMaker Studio
- Platforms: Windows; PlayStation 4 Nintendo Switch; Xbox One iOS; Android
- Release: April 18, 2019: Windows; April 18, 2019; Switch, PS4; July 30, 2019; Xbox One; July 16, 2020; iOS; Nov 6, 2020; Android; Dec 9, 2020
- Genres: Open world, adventure

Forager is a 2D open world adventure game developed by Argentine studio HopFrog and published by Humble Bundle. The game was released for Microsoft Windows on April 18th, 2019, then later for Nintendo Switch, PlayStation 4, Xbox One, iOS, and Android. In Forager, the player progresses by leveling up and obtaining resources that spawn throughout the world's lands, using them to craft new buildings, objects and tools. Using earnable gold to buy more land, the player discovers various puzzles and dungeons.

== Gameplay ==
Forager combines mechanics commonly seen in idle games with those of an adventure or exploration game. Resource collection starts off slow, but as the player collects more XP and land, alternative resource collection and respawn chances grow. The player can harvest massive amounts for crafting and leveling, eventually leading to automated systems to collect resources and produce other products and goods.

The leveling system in the game consists of a large grid of unlockable perks, which also may unlock new tools or craftable objects. Everything the player does from harvesting resources, to crafting objects, to killing enemies, has a positive impact on their XP used to advance levels.

The player is able to simulate a variety of tasks related to cooking, economics, engineering, farming, fishing, hunting, magic, manufacturing, mining, and more.

By obtaining money through crafting, skills, looting, and economic tasks, the player is able to purchase more lands to expand their base, explore new areas, and obtain new classes of resources or encounter new enemies and other NPC's.

== Development ==
The creator of Forager, Mariano Cavallero, dropped out of school to develop video games. He started developing Forager in a Game Jam with the help of a loan from his mother. Mariano then participated in a competition in which he won a trip to the U.S. to show off his work, eventually getting offered a publishing deal by Humble Bundle for Forager.

A year after release on Steam the gamehad sold 600,000 units.

A multiplayer update was worked on but eventually cancelled.

== Reception ==
Reception

Aggregate score
| Aggregator | Score |
|---|---|
| Metacritic | PC: 78/100; NS: 78/100 |

Review scores
| Publication | Score |
|---|---|
| Destructoid | 8/10 |
| Nintendo Life | 9/10 |
| Nintendo World Report | 6.5/10 |
| Pocket Gamer | 4/5 |
| Push Square | 7/10 |
| Shacknews | 8/10 |
| TouchArcade | 3.5/5 |
| PC World | 4/5 |

Forager received "generally favorable" reviews, according to review aggregator Metacritic.

Nathan Grayson wrote a review on Kotaku calling Forager an "extremely well-made" game and called it "obviously a labor of love" while also noting that the game was "a crafting game stripped down to its very bones" and stating that players may prefer a game with "more than pure progression". Jeff Ramos on Polygon says that the game's repetitive and tedious nature serve to "make the game's bright moments all the brighter" and says that "in Forager, grinding is almost all I have to do, and I can hardly pull myself away" praising the game for its use of grind-heavy mechanics. Jordan Devore of Destructoid called Forager a "[game] that knows the value of a good grind" and praised its open-ended design structure. Ollie Reynolds of Nintendo Life lauded the engaging gameplay, crafting mechanics, and charming presentation while taking minor issue with a few quality of life design choices. In a much more critical review. Jordan Rudek of Nintendo World Report commended the game's colorful presentation, laid-back gameplay, procedural generation elements, and free content updates while lamenting its aimless nature, repetitive gameplay, and environmental navigation. Stephen Tailby of Push Square similarly praised the addicting nature of the gameplay aided by the pixel art style and relaxing soundtrack, and criticized the fiddly controls as well as the combat. Brittany Vincent of Shacknews enjoyed the rewarding and accessible nature of the gameplay and disliked the unintelligent AI and shallow dungeon design.

Pocket Gamer and TouchArcade criticized the game's touch controls on iOS and Android while ultimately maintaining that the charming and engaging nature of the game was successfully retained.
