= Jonathan Moyle =

British journalist (died 1990)

Jonathan Moyle (died 1990) was the 28-year-old editor of the magazine 'Defence Helicopter World' and former RAF helicopter pilot, was found dead in room 1406 of Santiago's Hotel Carrera on 31. March 1990. His purpose in Santiago was to attend a Chilean sponsored defence conference.

== The circumstances ==
He was found hanging in a wardrobe with a pillow case over his head. But a needle mark on his leg and blood on the bed were not considered in the first police analysis.

He was interested in a Bell Helicopter for civil use that the Chilean company Industrias Cardoen was converting to multi-use, especially for Third World conditions and economies. At that time, just before the Gulf War (the invasion of Kuwait by Iraqi troops began 2. August 1990), Iraq was a potential customer for the helicopter.

== The investigation ==
Moyle's death was considered initially by the Chilean and British authorities as suicide or death in some sort of "bizarre sex game". But in December 1991, after pressure from the Moyle family, a judicial investigation in Chile concluded he had been assassinated, but as the police couldn't identify any suspect they halted the manhunt.

The United Kingdom inquest also into the death of Moyle, opened in Exeter in November 1990. It was adjourned by forensic doctor Richard Van Oppen after a pathologist said the autopsy could not be completed due to the fact that vital organs had been removed. In 1998 the reconvened inquest found that he had been unlawfully killed and the authorities later apologised to the family for spreading the allegation of suicide.

Excerpts from an apparently "un-redacted" version of a CIA report entitled Project Babylon, published in 2013 by the British magazine Lobster and in May 2014 by the newspaper Tribune, blame the murder of Jonathan Moyle on a British government agent, the late Stephan Adolphus Kock. The "un-redacted" CIA report states: "Meantime, as we co-ordinated an MI6 set-up, alleged nuclear capacitors shipped from US by Euromac for Iraq was [sic] seized at Heathrow Airport, it led to the arrest of CEO Ali Daghir and Jeanine Speckman, Kock found that defence journalist, Jonathan Moyle, possessed evidence of UK covert deals. Consequently, Kock and [a third named agent] eliminated him in Santiago, Chile. [S NF NC]."

== Arms deals ==
The dead man's father, retired teacher Tony Moyle, said that the motive for the murder lay in Moyle's uncovering of information regarding arms shipments from Chile to Iraq.

The family's claim of a concealment has been supported by a book "The Valkyrie Operation" on Moyle's death written by Wensley Clarkson. The author alleges that Moyle was killed by local hitmen hired by arms dealer Carlos Cardoen, who denies he had any participation in Moyle's death.

In late 1997 a Santiago Court of Appeal reopened the investigation into Jonathan Moyle's death following representations from a lawyer representing the family.

== Insights from Robin Ramsay ==
The Editor of Lobster provided additional insight and context to the affair in a speech to the Centre for Security Analysis in London on 8 November 2000 and published in the summer 2001 edition of Lobster - issue 41. Explaining how the SIS's are "so awful to work for", he continued:

Take Jonathan Moyle, a not very bright, gung-ho Queen and country man. Young Moyle, while at University at Aberystwyth, was a Special Branch snitch who thought it his patriotic duty to tell the local SB who was smoking dope. On graduating he became an agent for - well, MI6 probably, though who knows? Moyle ended up being murdered in Chile. According to the book about him, Moyle wasn't very subtle as an intelligence asset and was poking around the Chilean arms dealer Cardoen - one of Mark Thatcher's friends - while Cardoen was doing a big helicopter deal with the Iraqis. This was in the run-up to the American attack on Iraq. Moyle ended up dead in a wardrobe in Chile and what does the local FCO guy do? Tells the media that Moyle was the victim of an auto-erotic accident: strangled himself while having a wank.

== Aftermath ==
There are some literature and film about the circumstances of the death:

- JONATHAN MOYLE'S DEATH A film about the death of the British journalist who died in Chile after interviewing an arms dealer.
- El misterioso asesinato de Jonathan Moyle, about the background of the assassination by Carlos Saldivia Aravena, Santiago de Chile, Editorial Chile-América : CESOC, 1999, in Spanish Language
- Angeles y solitarios, by Ramon Diaz Eterovic, 2004, ISBN 978-84-8136-364-7, crime novel, the protagonist is drawn into an investigation of Chile’s role in the international arms trade when an investigative journalist is murdered pursuing the truth about the death of a British journalist in Santiago. In Spanish Language
